= USS Paul F. Foster =

Spruance-class destroyer

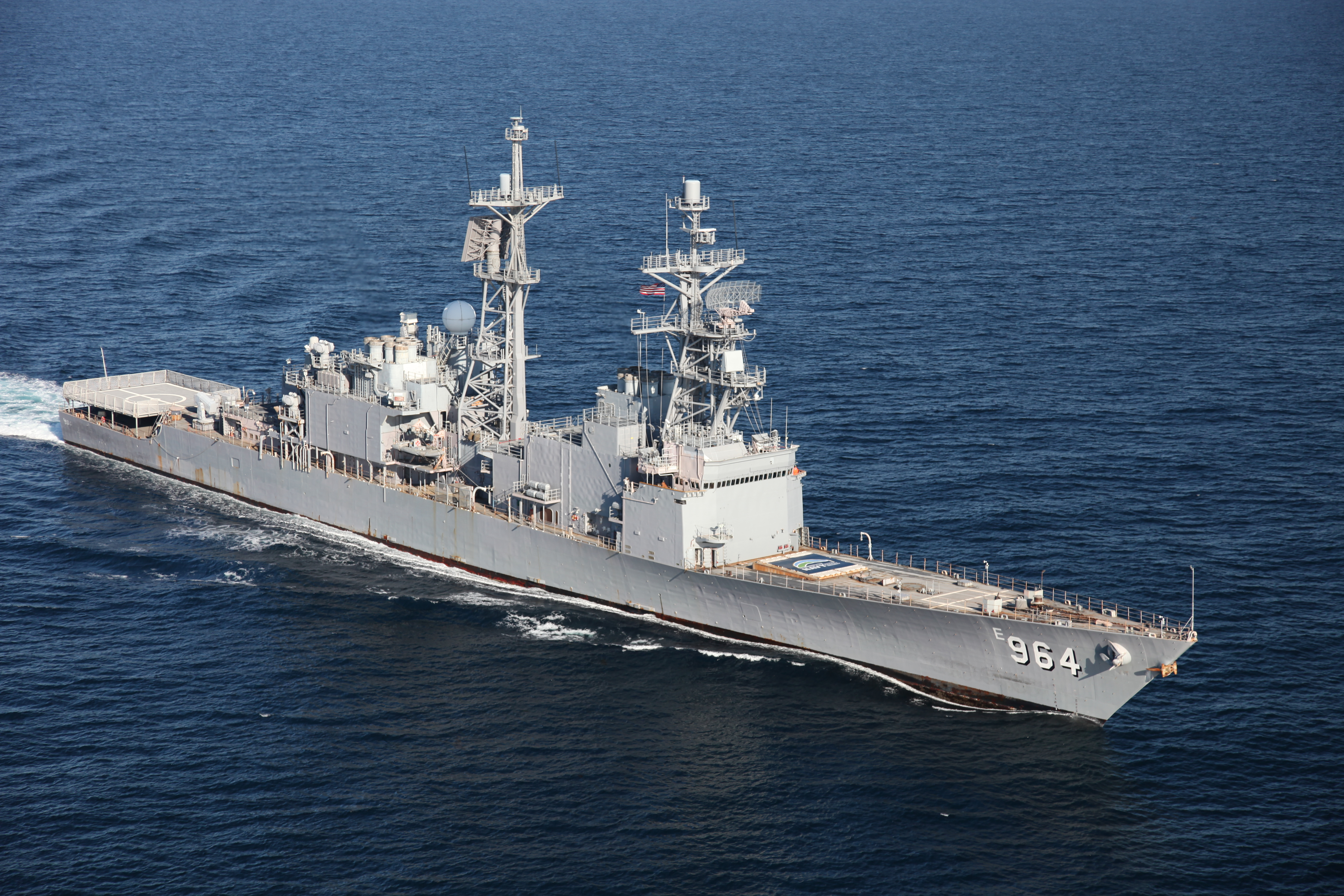
- USS Paul F. Foster underway on 17 November 2011

History

United States
- Name: Paul F. Foster
- Namesake: Paul F. Foster
- Ordered: 1 June 1970
- Builder: Ingalls Shipbuilding
- Laid down: 6 February 1973
- Launched: 22 February 1974
- Sponsored by: Isabelle L. Foster
- Acquired: 1 February 1976
- Commissioned: 21 February 1976
- Decommissioned: 27 March 2003
- In service: 1976–2003 (as active warship); 2006–present (as SDTS ship)
- Reclassified: EDD-964, 16 March 2005
- Stricken: 6 April 2004
- Home port: Port Hueneme
- Identification: Callsign: NMDX; {ship-to-ship tactical communications, radio call sign (Bloomfeild); Hull number: DD-964
- Motto: Honor, Valor, Service
- Status: Used as Self Defense Test Ship
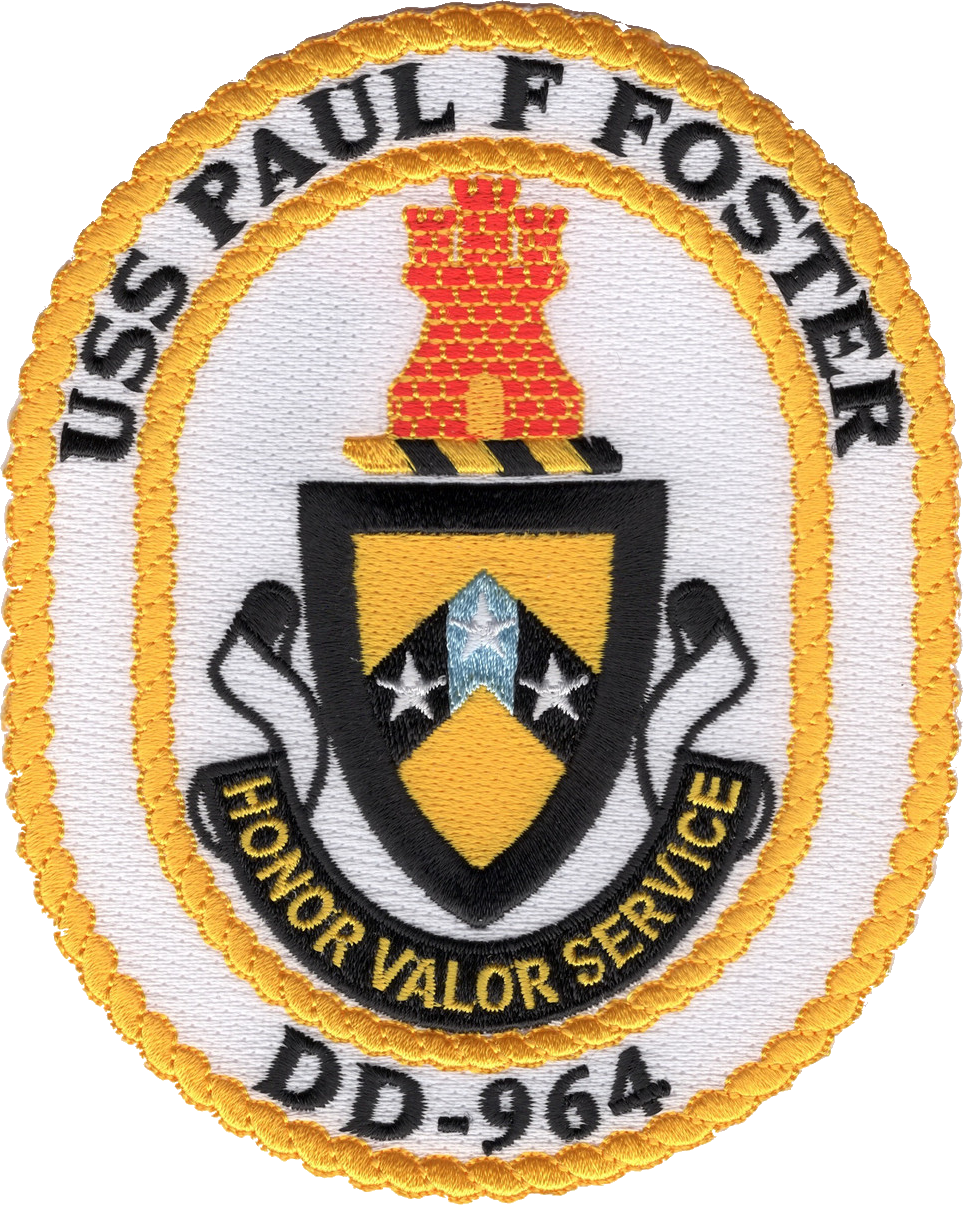
- Badge

General characteristics
- Class & type: Spruance-class destroyer
- Displacement: 8,040 long tons (8,170 t) full load
- Length: 529 ft (161 m) waterline; 563 ft (172 m) overall
- Beam: 55 ft (17 m)
- Draft: 29 ft (8.8 m)
- Installed power: 3 × 501-K17 generator sets (2,000 kW (2,700 hp) each)
- Propulsion: 4 × General Electric LM2500 gas turbines, 2 shafts, 80,000 shp (60 MW)
- Speed: 32.5 knots (60.2 km/h; 37.4 mph)
- Range: 6,000 nmi (11,000 km; 6,900 mi) at 20 knots (37 km/h; 23 mph)
- Complement: 19 officers, 315 enlisted
- Sensors & processing systems: AN/SPS-40 air search radar; AN/SPG-60 fire control radar; AN/SPS-55 surface search radar; AN/SPQ-9 gun fire control radar; Mark 23 TAS automatic detection and tracking radar; AN/SPS-65 missile fire control radar; AN/SQS-53 bow-mounted active sonar; AN/SQR-19 TACTAS towed array passive sonar; Naval Tactical Data System
- Electronic warfare & decoys: AN/SLQ-32 electronic warfare system; AN/SLQ-25 Nixie torpedo countermeasures; Mark 36 SRBOC decoy launching system; AN/SLQ-49 inflatable decoys
- Armament: 2 × 5 in (127 mm) 54 caliber Mark 45 dual purpose guns; 2 × 20 mm Phalanx CIWS Mark 15 guns; 1 × 8 cell ASROC launcher (removed); 1 × 8 cell NATO Sea Sparrow Mark 29 missile launcher; 2 × quadruple Harpoon missile canisters; 2 × Mark 32 triple 12.75 in (324 mm) torpedo tubes (Mk 46 torpedoes); 1 × 61 cell Mk 41 VLS launcher for Tomahawk missiles
- Aircraft carried: 2 × Sikorsky SH-60 Seahawk LAMPS III helicopters
- Aviation facilities: Flight deck and enclosed hangar for up to two medium-lift helicopters

USS Paul F. Foster (DD-964), named for Vice Admiral Paul F. Foster, USN (1889–1972), is a Spruance-class destroyer built by the Ingalls Shipbuilding Division of Litton Industries at Pascagoula, Mississippi. She was commissioned on 21 February 1976 and decommissioned on 27 March 2003. She is now ex-Paul F. Foster (EDD-964), serving as a Self Defense Test Ship for experimental U.S. Navy weapons and sensors and the last Spruance-class destroyer that is still afloat.

== History ==
1990 to 1991 cruise book
Paul F. Foster's 1990 to 1991 cruise book

=== 1970s ===
As the initial Spruance-class destroyer assigned to the Pacific Fleet, Paul F. Foster had many milestone firsts, including successfully firing a NATO Sea Sparrow missile, demonstrating the feasibility of landing H-46 helicopters, and determining the operational limits of the SH-3 helicopter.

Operating out of San Diego, Paul F. Foster became the first Spruance-class destroyer to deploy to the Western Pacific in March 1978. The ship deployed again in 1979 and 1982, serving in the Indian Ocean and Western Pacific.

=== 1980s ===
Paul F. Foster joined Destroyer Squadron Nine and moved to its new home port of Long Beach, California, in August 1983. She became the Navy's first "all electric destroyer" after major modifications at Long Beach Naval Shipyard, which included the addition of a fourth ship's service gas turbine generator.

On 29 August 1984, Paul F. Foster began its fourth Western Pacific deployment as Destroyer Squadron Nine's flagship, with then Desron Nine Commodore, T.O. Gabriel and his staff embarked aboard, leading a five-ship surface action group and participating in several major allied fleet exercises.

During a fifth deployment beginning in August 1986 with Desron Nine as part of the Carl Vinson Battle Group, Paul F. Foster was awarded the Meritorious Unit Commendation for her performance in Operation Kernel Potlatch in the North Pacific and Bering Sea.

From July 1987 through July 1988, Paul F. Foster completed a regular overhaul at Northwest Marine Iron Works in Portland, Oregon. During the overhaul the ship received over 55 major ship alterations, including installation of the Mk 41 Vertical Launch System for Tomahawk cruise missiles, the AN/SQQ-89 Anti-Submarine Warfare Detection System, and facilities to employ the Navy's most sophisticated submarine helicopter, the LAMPS MkIII.

Paul F. Foster departed on its sixth Western Pacific/Indian Ocean deployment on 24 February 1989 in company with the Ranger Battle Group. Conducting operations in the northern Arabian Sea, she was awarded the Armed Forces Expeditionary Medal.

=== 1990 to 2003 ===
2002 cruise book
Paul F. Foster's 2002 cruise book

On 8 December 1990, Paul F. Foster departed Long Beach on its seventh overseas deployment to the Persian Gulf in support of Operations Desert Shield and Desert Storm. The first ship to fire Tomahawk missiles against Iraqi targets from the Persian Gulf, she was instrumental in the liberation of Kuwait and in winning the campaign. Deploying for the eighth time on 20 July 1992, she returned to the Arabian Sea, where she operated in support of Persian Gulf Operations-Southern Watch while participating in numerous bilateral exercises with Persian Gulf Nations.

During the ship's ninth deployment, Paul F. Foster again served with the Carl Vinson Carrier Battle Group and was the first ship on the scene to provide assistance to a burning ocean tug, Glorious City, putting out the fire and saving its crew of seven.

Upon returning from deployment on 20 October 1994, Paul F. Foster entered into a regular overhaul at Long Beach Naval Shipyard where several of the latest technological weapons, sensors and engineering systems were added. A major change implemented during this overhaul was a retrofit of a berthing, to accommodate her first female crew members. After completion of overhaul, she moved to her new home port of Everett, Washington arriving November 1995.

During the ship's tenth deployment which began 21 February 1997, Paul F. Foster was a part of the multinational force during Persian Gulf Operations, enforcing United Nations sanctions against Iraq.

Paul F. Foster departed for her eleventh deployment on 27 January 1999. While serving as part of the Pacific Middle East Force, she participated in Operation Iron Siren, Eager Sentry, and Arabian Gauntlet. In addition, the ship conducted boarding's in support of United Nations sanctions against Iraq.

Paul F. Foster departed for her twelfth deployment on 11 January 2001, where the ship once again conducted numerous boarding operations in support of the United Nations sanctions against Iraq. Her thirteenth and final deployment began on 18 June 2002.

=== Decommissioning and Self Defense Test Ship role ===
Tour of Paul F. Foster as a self-defense test ship.

Paul F. Foster was decommissioned as an active warship on 27 March 2003. In 2004, Paul F. Foster was designated to replace ex-Decatur as a test ship for the Navy, a role she assumed in 2005. In support of this new role, the now ex-Paul F. Foster was assigned to Naval Surface Warfare Center, Port Hueneme Division. She is the only ship of her class that exists as of 2025, as all of her sister ships were either scrapped or sunk after decommissioning. Arthur W. Radford (DD-968), the last remaining Spruance Class other than Paul F. Foster, was sunk to create an artificial reef off Cape May, New Jersey on 10 August 2011.

On 8 April 2011, Wired.com reported that ex-Paul F. Foster had successfully used the Maritime Laser Demonstrator for the first time in a sea-to-sea target test, sinking a small inflatable motorboat at a range of one mile in rough seas.

On 17 November 2011, ex-Paul F. Foster demonstrated the use of shipboard alternative fuel, while underway in the Pacific Ocean on a 50–50 blend of an algae-derived, hydro-processed algal oil and petroleum F-76. The ship arrived Thursday morning to the Naval Surface Warfare Center at Port Hueneme in Southern California after traveling for 17 hours on a maiden trip from San Diego.

On 18 July 2016, ex-Paul F. Foster performed a test launch of the LRASM Anti-ship missile from her Mark 41 Vertical Launching System while underway in the Pacific Ocean.

In December 2023, it was announced by BAE Systems that the Navy had contracted with them to refurbish ex-Paul F. Foster, extending her service life as self-defense test ship. Refurbishment took place between April and December 2024 at a cost of $22 million.

== Awards and decorations ==
According to the U.S. Navy's unit awards website, Paul F. Foster received the following awards:

1st row	Combat Action Ribbon		Navy E Ribbon
2nd row	Navy Expeditionary Medal	Navy Unit Commendation	Meritorious Unit Citation
3rd row	Armed Forces Expeditionary Medal	Southwest Asia Service Medal	Kuwait Liberation Medal

== See also ==
- List of destroyers of the United States Navy
