= USS Fletcher (DD-992) =

Spruance-class destroyer

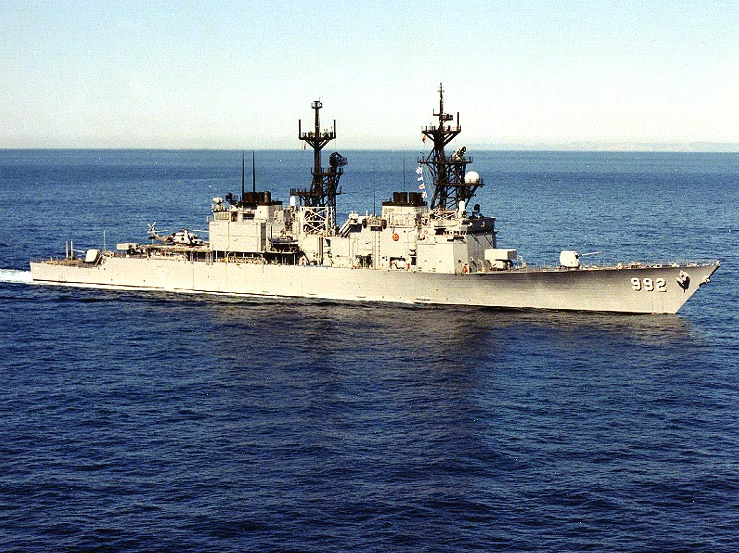
- USS Fletcher on 4 February 1988

History

United States
- Name: Fletcher
- Namesake: Adm Frank Friday Fletcher and Adm Frank Jack Fletcher
- Ordered: 15 January 1975
- Builder: Ingalls Shipbuilding
- Laid down: 24 April 1978
- Launched: 16 June 1979
- Acquired: 16 June 1980
- Commissioned: 12 July 1980
- Decommissioned: 1 October 2004
- Stricken: 1 October 2004
- Identification: Callsign: NJCN; Hull number: DD-992
- Motto: Pace et Bello Paratus; (In Peace and War Prepared)
- Nickname(s): Fighting Friday; Fighting Jack
- Fate: Sunk as target, 16 July 2008
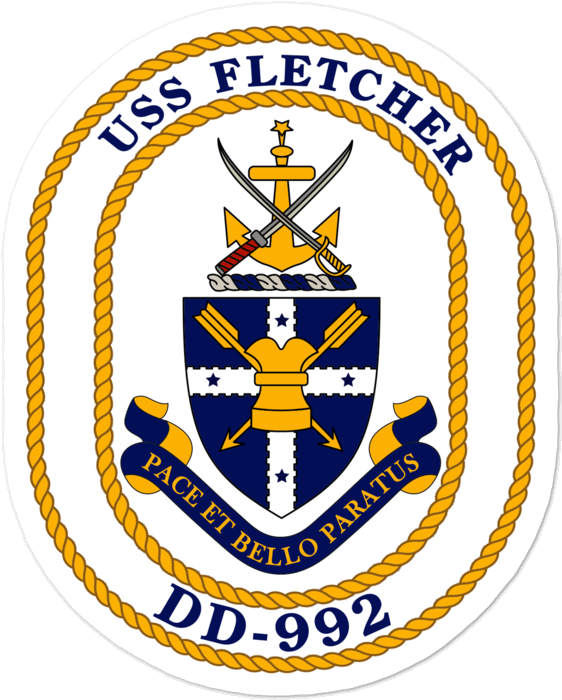
- Badge

General characteristics
- Class & type: Spruance-class destroyer
- Displacement: 8,040 long tons (8,170 t) full load
- Length: 529 ft (161 m) waterline; 563 ft (172 m) overall
- Beam: 55 ft (17 m)
- Draft: 29 ft (8.8 m)
- Installed power: 3 × 501-K17 generator sets (2,000 kW (2,700 hp) each)
- Propulsion: 4 × General Electric LM2500 gas turbines, 2 shafts, 80,000 shp (60 MW)
- Speed: 32.5 knots (60.2 km/h; 37.4 mph)
- Range: 6,000 nmi (11,000 km; 6,900 mi) at 20 knots (37 km/h; 23 mph)
- Complement: 19 officers, 315 enlisted
- Sensors & processing systems: AN/SPS-40 air search radar; AN/SPG-60 fire control radar; AN/SPS-55 surface search radar; AN/SPQ-9 gun fire control radar; Mark 23 TAS automatic detection and tracking radar; AN/SPS-65 missile fire control radar; AN/SQS-53 bow-mounted active sonar; AN/SQR-19 TACTAS towed array passive sonar; Naval Tactical Data System
- Electronic warfare & decoys: AN/SLQ-32 electronic warfare system; AN/SLQ-25 Nixie torpedo countermeasures; Mark 36 SRBOC decoy launching system; AN/SLQ-49 inflatable decoys
- Armament: 2 × 5 in (127 mm) 54 caliber Mark 45 dual purpose guns; 2 × 20 mm Phalanx CIWS Mark 15 guns; 1 × 8 cell ASROC launcher (removed); 1 × 8 cell NATO Sea Sparrow Mark 29 missile launcher; 2 × quadruple Harpoon missile canisters; 2 × Mark 32 triple 12.75 in (324 mm) torpedo tubes (Mk 46 torpedoes); 1 × 61 cell Mk 41 VLS launcher for Tomahawk missiles; 1 × 21 cell RIM-116 Rolling Airframe Missile
- Aircraft carried: 2 × Sikorsky SH-60 Seahawk LAMPS III helicopters
- Aviation facilities: Flight deck and enclosed hangar for up to two medium-lift helicopters

USS Fletcher (DD-992), the thirtieth Spruance-class destroyer, was part of the first major class of United States Navy surface ships to be powered by gas turbines. She was commissioned in July 1980 and was deployed mainly in the western and southern Pacific, but also voyaged to the Indian Ocean and Persian Gulf. She was the second ship in the U.S. Navy to bear this name but the first to be named after Admiral Frank Friday Fletcher and Frank Jack Fletcher. After her decommissioning in 2004, she was sunk in a torpedo test exercise in 2008.

== Construction ==
Designed and built by Ingalls Shipyards of Litton Industries in Pascagoula, Mississippi, Fletcher was a member of the first major class of surface ships in the United States Navy to be powered by gas turbine engines. Four General Electric LM2500 gas turbine engines, marine versions of those used in DC-10 aircraft, drove the ship at speeds in excess of 30 knots (56 km/h). Twin controllable reversible pitch propellers provided Fletcher with a degree of maneuverability unique among warships of her size.

== History ==
Commissioned in July 1980, Fletcher was immediately sent to join the Pacific Fleet. Starting in 1982, Fletcher made regular deployments to the western and southern Pacific, with some of those extending into the Indian Ocean and Persian Gulf areas. During 1994 and 1995, she was modernized with the vertical launch system, giving her a much broader range of capabilities.

A highly versatile multi-mission destroyer, Fletcher was capable of operating independently or in company with amphibious or carrier task forces. Her main mission was to operate offensively in a strike warfare or antisubmarine warfare (ASW) role. The Tomahawk weapons systems provided Fletcher with long range cruise missile capability for use in tactical strike operations. The ship's primary passive ASW sensor was the AN/SQR-19 tactical towed array sonar (TACTAS). Its active sonar together with the Mk 116 underwater fire control system combined as one of the most advanced underwater detection and fire control systems ever developed. The Naval Tactical Data System (NTDS) provided the ship with faster and more accurate processing of target information. Integration of the ship's digital gun fire control system in the NTDS provided quick reaction in the mission areas of shore bombardment, anti-surface, and anti-aircraft warfare.

Fletcher was originally armed with an 8-tube ASROC launcher, but was later upgraded with a sixty-one cell Mk 41 vertical launching system for firing Tomahawk land attack missiles (TLAMs) and anti-submarine rockets (ASROCs). Other weapons included two Mk 45 light weight 5 inch guns, two triple Mk 32 torpedo tubes, and facilities for operating LAMPS helicopters. The ship was also armed with the NATO Sea Sparrow missile system, a short range, surface-to-air defensive weapon; and the Harpoon weapon system, a medium range, surface-to-surface, anti-ship cruise missile. For defense against anti-ship missile, Fletcher employed two Mk 15 (PHALANX) 20 mm close-in weapons system, SRBOC chaff, and topside armor in addition to the NATO Sea Sparrow missile system. The AN/SLQ-32 countermeasures set provided Fletcher with additional defense against anti-ship missiles through the use of active electronic countermeasures.

Crew comfort and habitability were an integral part of the design. Berthing compartments were spacious and the ship was equipped with amenities not usually found aboard other destroyers, including a crew's gymnasium and an improvised library of sorts with several hundred fiction novels. Although Fletcher was as large as a World War II cruiser, a high degree of automation permitted a crew of 24 officers and 296 enlisted to operate the ship.

=== Deployment in 1983 ===
On 20 July 1983, The New York Times reported that the Fletcher, along with seven other vessels in the carrier Ranger battle group, left San Diego on Friday 15 July 1983, and were headed for the western Pacific when they were rerouted and ordered to steam for Central America to conduct training and flight operations in areas off the coasts of Nicaragua, El Salvador and Honduras as part of major military exercises planned for that summer. The other ships in the battle group were the cruiser Horne, the guided missile destroyer Lynde McCormick, the destroyer Fife, the frigate Marvin Shields, the oiler Wichita, and the support ship Camden.

Following the diversion to Central America, Fletcher, along with Battle Group Echo, resumed the planned deployment to the Indian Ocean. Following the regular stops at Pearl Harbor and Subic Bay, Philippines, Fletcher was tasked with steaming down the coast of Vietnam, just outside territorial waters, to affirm the right-of-way of maritime traffic in international waters. Following the transit of the Straits of Malacca, Fletcher spent virtually the entire period in the Indian Ocean on station in the North Arabian Sea, as previously planned port calls were cancelled due to the changing nature of political and operational matters in the Mid-East. The one exception was an unplanned port call in Port Victoria, Seychelles. Fletcher returned to San Diego on 29 February 1984.

=== Sea Swap in 2003 ===
On 2 August 2002, USS Fletcher departed Pearl Harbor to begin Sea Swap, an experimental program that calls for a Spruance-class destroyer to deploy and remain on station for more than 400 days. The original Sea Swap Fletcher crew, under the command of Cmdr. Thomas Neal, stopped in Yokosuka, Japan, Hong Kong and Singapore. While in port Singapore, numerous repairs were accomplished as part of an availability period. Fletcher then headed to the Persian Gulf. The original Fletcher team sailed the ship to the Persian Gulf and spent the next four months conducting Maritime Interdiction Operations (MIO) in support of United Nations sanctions on Iraq. The Sea Swap initiative became a reality in January 2003, when the Fletcher crew pulled the ship into Fremantle, Australia, and made preparations to turn it over to the former crew of the USS Kinkaid (DD-965), under the command of CDR Mike Slotsky. After decommissioning Kinkaid, they had embarked a flight to Australia ready to turn over and assume command of Fletcher. Team Kinkaid then made preparations to take Fletcher back to the Persian Gulf for their six-month deployment. The original Fletcher crew then flew back to Pearl Harbor and disassembled to their new duty stations. Team Kinkaid completed a 4-month deployment in the Persian Gulf and participated in Escort Operations and Tomahawk Missile Strikes at the beginning of Operation Iraqi Freedom (OIF); at same time the USS Oldendorf (DD-972) was decommissioning in San Diego. Team Oldendorf, under the command of CDR Charles Gaouette, received the Fletcher in Singapore from team Kinkaid. Team Oldendorf then proceeded to the Persian Gulf and completed their deployment. They then proceeded to Fremantle, Australia for their relief from the crew of USS Elliot (DD-967). It was being prepared for decommissioning. The crew of the Elliot, under the command of CDR John Nolan, then embarked on a flight to Fremantle to receive the Fletcher from Team Oldendorf. Team Elliot was the last crew to embark onboard Fletcher. Team Elliot then completed a final 4-month deployment in the Persian Gulf in 2004, continuing Maritime Interdiction Operations (MIO) in support of Operation Iraqi Freedom.

=== Fate ===
Fletcher was decommissioned and stricken from the Navy list 1 October 2004. In 2004, the President requested authority to sell Fletcher to Chile; in 2005 her transfer to Pakistan was authorized by the Senate. On 16 July 2008, the U.S. Navy, working with the Royal Australian Navy, sank Fletcher as part of a new torpedo test exercise. The Australian submarine HMAS Waller test fired a modified live Mk48 Mod7 ADCAP torpedo specifically designed for shallow water operations. The Fletcher suffered a direct hit, breaking in half and sinking within minutes. The Fletcher's final resting place is located at 23°01′02″N 159°59′09″W.

== Awards ==
- Navy Unit Commendation – (16-20 Dec 1998, Jan-May 2003)
- Navy Meritorious Unit Commendation – (Jan 1999-Sep 2001, Aug 2000-Jan 2001)
- Battle "E" – (1982, 1994, 2003)
- Coast Guard Unit Commendation – (Jan-Feb 2000)
