= USS Oldendorf =

Spruance-class destroyer of the US Navy (in service 1978–2003)

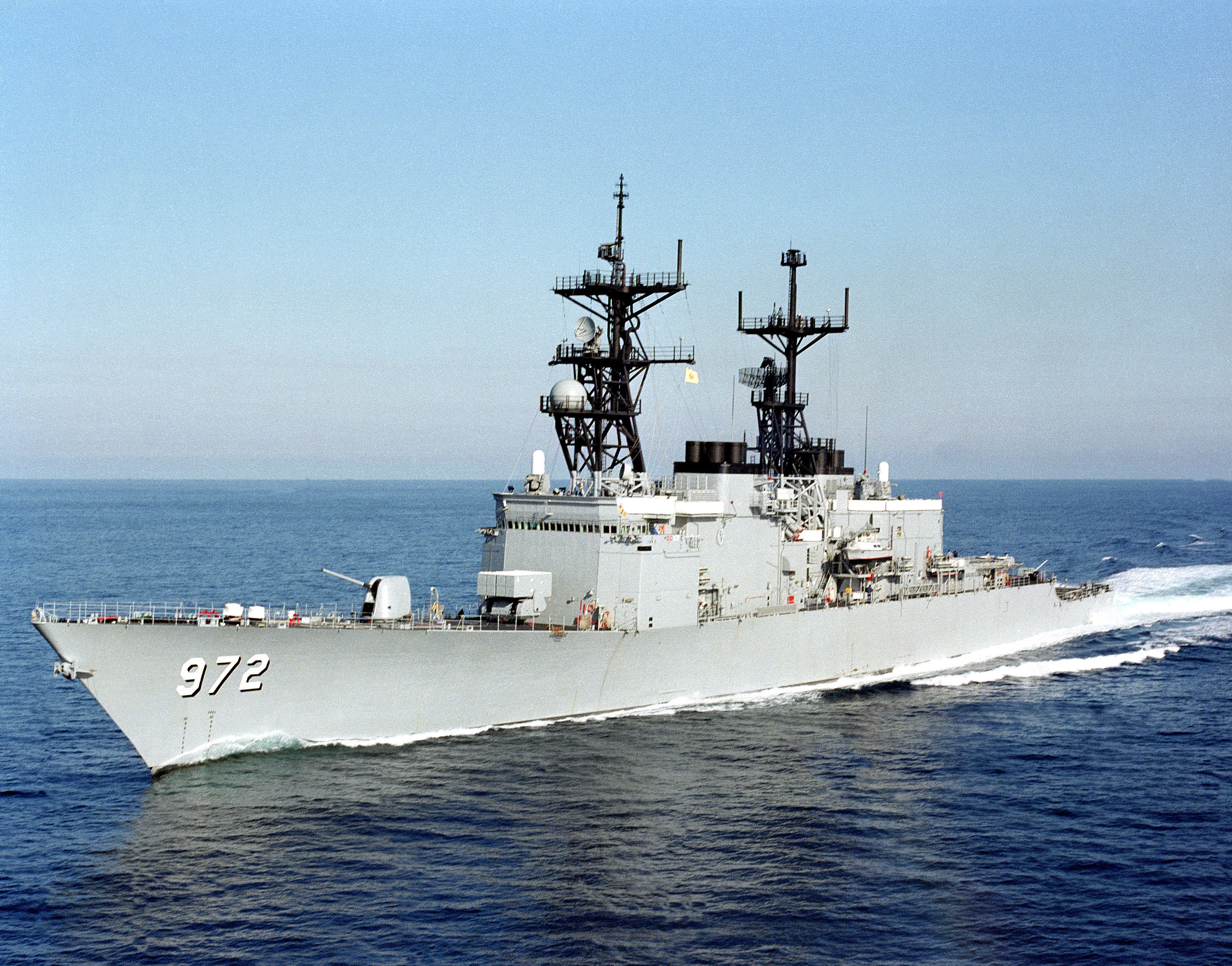
- USS Oldendorf on 6 January 1984

History

United States
- Name: Oldendorf
- Namesake: Jesse B. Oldendorf
- Ordered: 26 January 1972
- Builder: Ingalls Shipbuilding
- Laid down: 27 December 1974
- Launched: 21 October 1975
- Commissioned: 4 March 1978
- Decommissioned: 20 June 2003
- Stricken: 6 April 2004
- Identification: Callsign: NOLY; Hull number: DD-972
- Motto: Ad Proelium Victoriamque Futuram; 'To the Fight and Victory Ahead'
- Fate: Sunk as target, 22 August 2005

General characteristics
- Class & type: Spruance-class destroyer
- Displacement: 8,040 long tons (8,170 t) full load
- Length: 529 ft (161 m) waterline; 563 ft (172 m) overall
- Beam: 55 ft (17 m)
- Draft: 29 ft (8.8 m)
- Installed power: 3 × 501-K17 generator sets (2,000 kW (2,700 hp) each)
- Propulsion: 4 × General Electric LM2500 gas turbines, 2 shafts, 80,000 shp (60 MW)
- Speed: 32.5 knots (60.2 km/h; 37.4 mph)
- Range: 6,000 nmi (11,000 km; 6,900 mi) at 20 knots (37 km/h; 23 mph)
- Complement: 19 officers, 315 enlisted
- Sensors & processing systems: AN/SPS-40 air search radar; AN/SPG-60 fire control radar; AN/SPS-55 surface search radar; AN/SPQ-9 gun fire control radar; Mark 23 TAS automatic detection and tracking radar; AN/SPS-65 missile fire control radar; AN/SQS-53 bow-mounted active sonar; AN/SQR-19 TACTAS towed array passive sonar; Naval Tactical Data System
- Electronic warfare & decoys: AN/SLQ-32 electronic warfare system; AN/SLQ-25 Nixie torpedo countermeasures; Mark 36 SRBOC decoy launching system; AN/SLQ-49 inflatable decoys
- Armament: 2 × 5 in (127 mm) 54 caliber Mark 45 dual purpose guns; 2 × 20 mm Phalanx CIWS Mark 15 guns; 1 × 8 cell ASROC launcher (removed); 1 × 8 cell NATO Sea Sparrow Mark 29 missile launcher; 2 × quadruple Harpoon missile canisters; 2 × Mark 32 triple 12.75 in (324 mm) torpedo tubes (Mk 46 torpedoes); 1 × 61 cell Mk 41 VLS launcher for Tomahawk missiles; 1 × 21 round RIM-116 Rolling Airframe Missile
- Aircraft carried: 2 × Sikorsky SH-60 Seahawk LAMPS III helicopters
- Aviation facilities: Flight deck and enclosed hangar for up to two medium-lift helicopters

USS Oldendorf (DD-972), named for Admiral Jesse B. Oldendorf USN, was a Spruance-class destroyer built by the Ingalls Shipbuilding Division of Litton Industries at Pascagoula, Mississippi.

== Construction ==
Oldendorf was the tenth Spruance- class destroyer and the first ship in the Navy named after Admiral Jesse B. Oldendorf, one of the most distinguished surface warfare flag officers to serve during World War II. She was built by Ingalls Shipbuilding in Pascagoula, Mississippi beginning 27 December 1974. The ship was launched on 21 October 1975 and commissioned on 4 March 1978.

== Ship's history ==
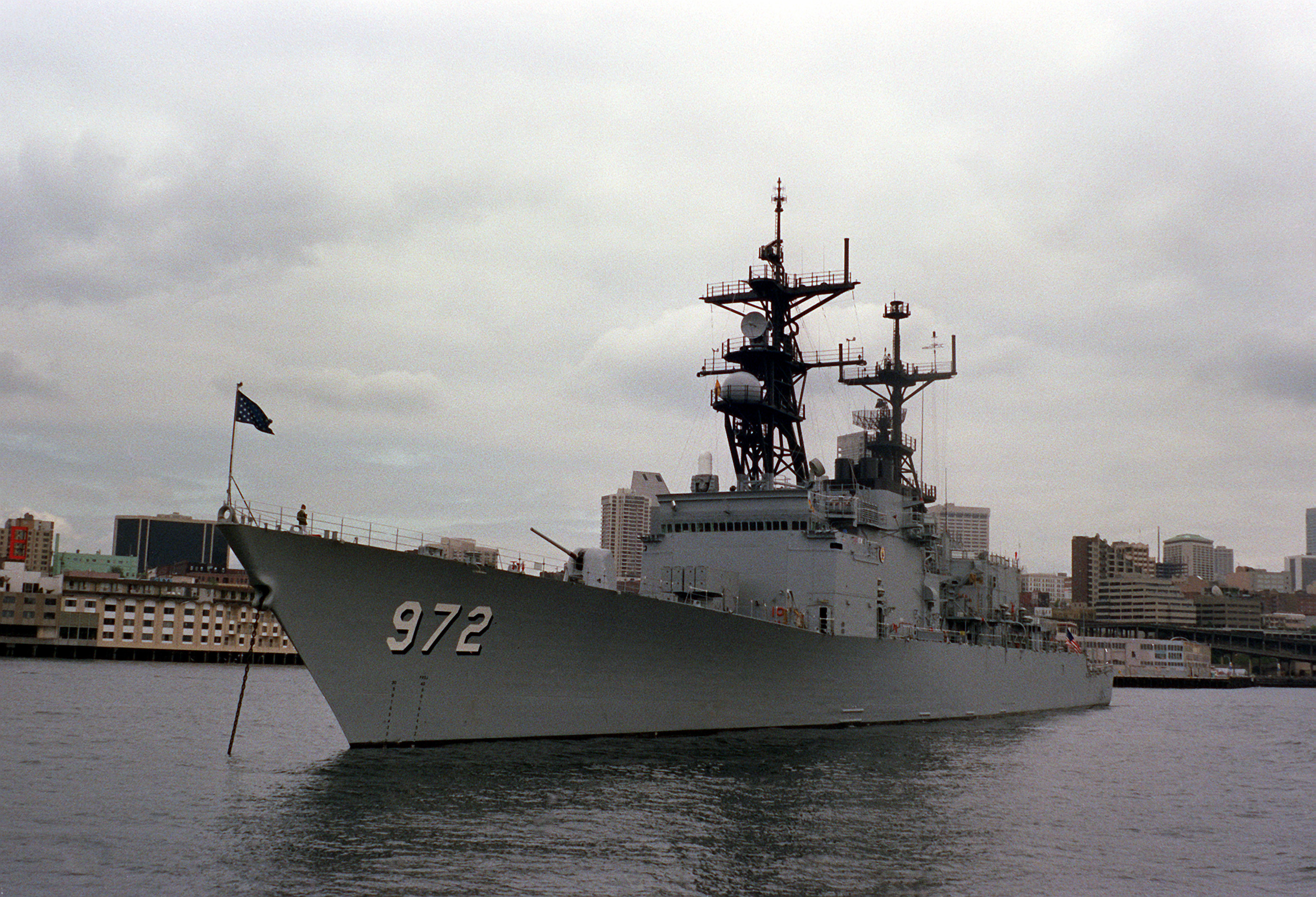
Oldendorf in Seattle c. 1983.

Oldendorf was originally stationed in San Diego, California, although the ship's first year was marked by shipyard work in Long Beach, California, and another visit to Litton Shipbuilders in Pascagoula, Mississippi. This schedule meant three Panama Canal transits for most of the ship's pre-commissioning crew within the a ship's first 12 months of service.

During her first Westpac deployment, which took place between May and November 1980, Oldendorf took part in a joint Australian-American-New Zealand anti-submarine exercise off the Western Australian coast during August 1980, which saw the destroyer conduct visits to the Western Australian town of Bunbury and the city of Perth.

Oldendorf conducted her second Westpac deployment, this time with the aircraft carrier USS Constellation and her Carrier Battle Group in October 1981 to the Persian Gulf, during which Oldendorf returned to visit the Western Australian city of Perth. She returned home in May 1982 before undergoing an overhaul from September 1982 to July 1983, then conducted work ups for the ship's third Westpac deployment which took place from January to May 1984.

Oldendorf was re-based to Yokosuka, Japan as part of the United States Seventh Fleet in August 1984. She was a member of the USS Midway battle group until being transferred to San Diego in 1991. During her time in the 7th Fleet she was involved with numerous events including regular exercises with all major navies in the area. In November 1986, along with USS Reeves and USS Rentz, she visited the port of Qingdao, China, the first group of US warships to visit mainland China since 1949. In 1988 Oldendorf deployed as part of the Seoul Olympics security force with the Nimitz battle group for which she received the Meritorious Unit Citation. During two separate deployments Oldendorf was responsible for rescuing Vietnamese refugees fleeing governmental oppression and during mid-1989 Oldendorf was the first warship to be granted access to the small Australian village of Gove since 1975, when a seafaring naval tug was last to visit. Oldendorf had received approval from the Aboriginal tribe leaders to make a port of call there as a sign of good will to the US Navy. She received numerous awards for achievement and excellence. The commanding officer during her deployment to the Gulf War was Commander Cyrus H Butt IV. Oldendorf was part of the first United States response to the invasion of Kuwait in 1990. She served with distinction throughout the war earning the Combat Action Ribbon escorting the various major warships and supporting the naval blockade of Iraq. She returned to Japan in mid-1991. The summer of 1991 the ship changed its homeport to Long Beach, California for a year and a half long overhaul in the Long Beach Naval Shipyards. In late 1992 the command was shifted to her final homeport of San Diego. In early 1993 she participated in Joint Interdiction LEO operations with the USCG off the South American coast returning in March 1993.

Oldendorf took part in the surface exercise Eager Sentry, as part of the larger Exercise Native Fury '94. Involving Kuwaiti and British military members, it was the largest naval exercise ever conducted in Kuwait. It was conducted from 4 April through 25 April, to demonstrates U.S. resolve to support the peace in the Persian Gulf region after ousting Iraq from Kuwait three years prior. Native Fury comprised several exercises under one umbrella. In the namesake exercises, two Maritime Prepositioning Ships sailed from their homeport of Diego Garcia and discharged more than 1,000 tanks, artillery pieces and vehicles at the port of Shuaibah, starting 5 April. Approximately 2,000 marines and sailors from I Marine Expeditionary Force, 7th Marine Regiment, 1st Force Service Support Group and Naval Beach Group One arrived by air, off-loaded and convoyed the equipment to a training range north of Kuwait City. There, they trained with the Kuwaiti Army and British Royal Marines, perfecting tactics which would delay, and perhaps turn back, any repeat of the invasion of Kuwait. Other elements of Native Fury involved the surface exercise Eager Sentry; Eager Archer, an aerial exercise; and Eager Express with explosive ordnance disposal units training on the southern Kuwaiti beaches.

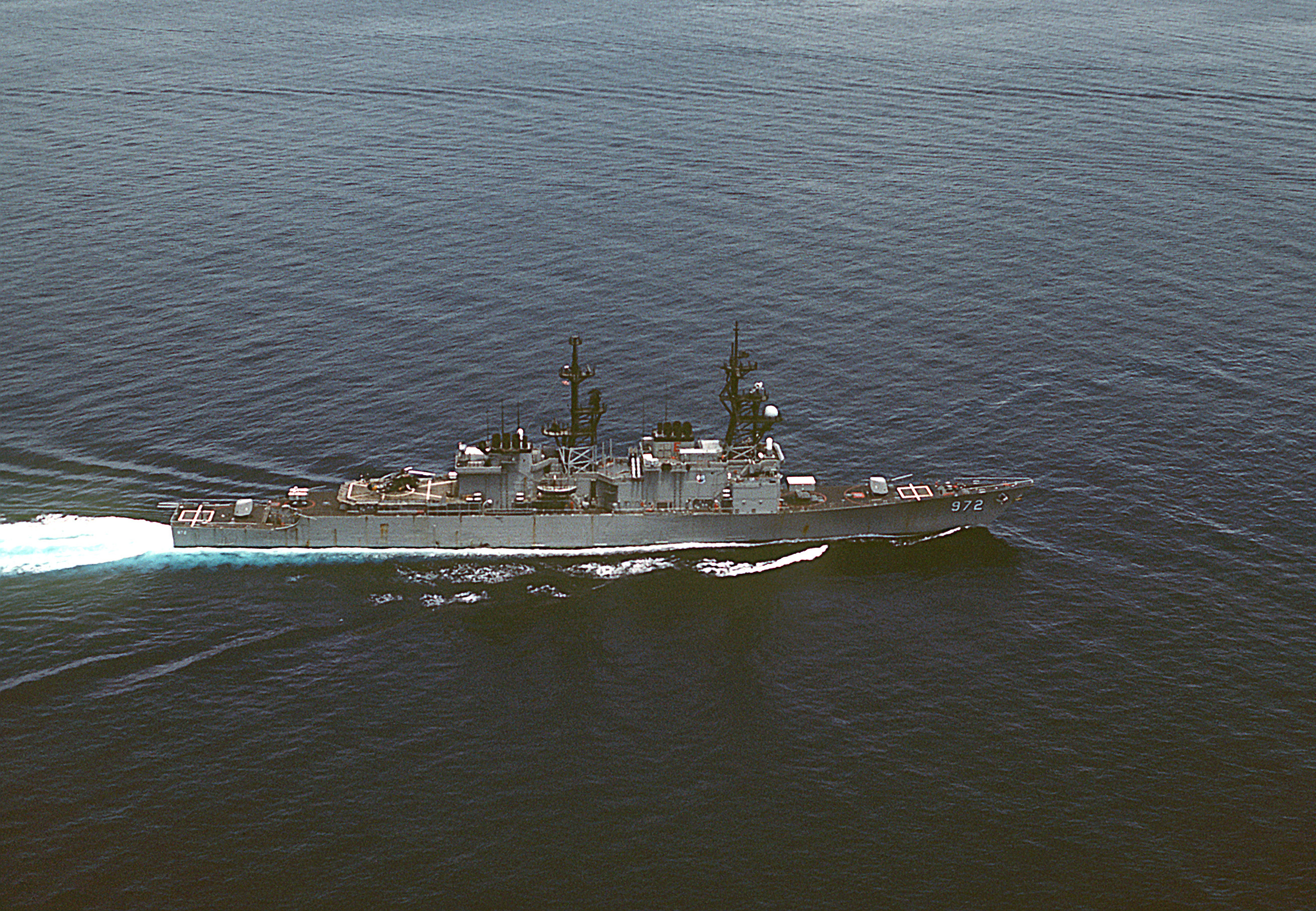
Oldendorf aerial view

As part of a reorganization by the Pacific Fleet's surface ships into six core battle groups and eight destroyer squadrons, with the reorganization scheduled to be completed by 1 October 1995, and homeport changes to be completed within the following, year, Oldendorf was reassigned to Destroyer Squadron 23.

Oldendorf departed on 1 December 1995, as part of the USS Nimitz Battle Group, for a regularly scheduled Western Pacific deployment.

In March 1996, and in response to the announcement of missile tests and military live-fire exercises to be conducted by the Chinese in the waters surrounding the island of Taiwan, the United States dispatched forward deployed naval assets, including a carrier and other combatants to the area to monitor the situation. USS Independence and other units in its battle group, operating in international waters, were on the scene from the beginning of the exercises. However, to augment the monitoring efforts, and further demonstrate U.S. commitment to peace and stability in the region, Nimitz and elements of its battle group, including Oldendorf, were ordered to sail from the Persian Gulf to the Western Pacific earlier than planned, after two months in the Persian Gulf for Operation Southern Watch.

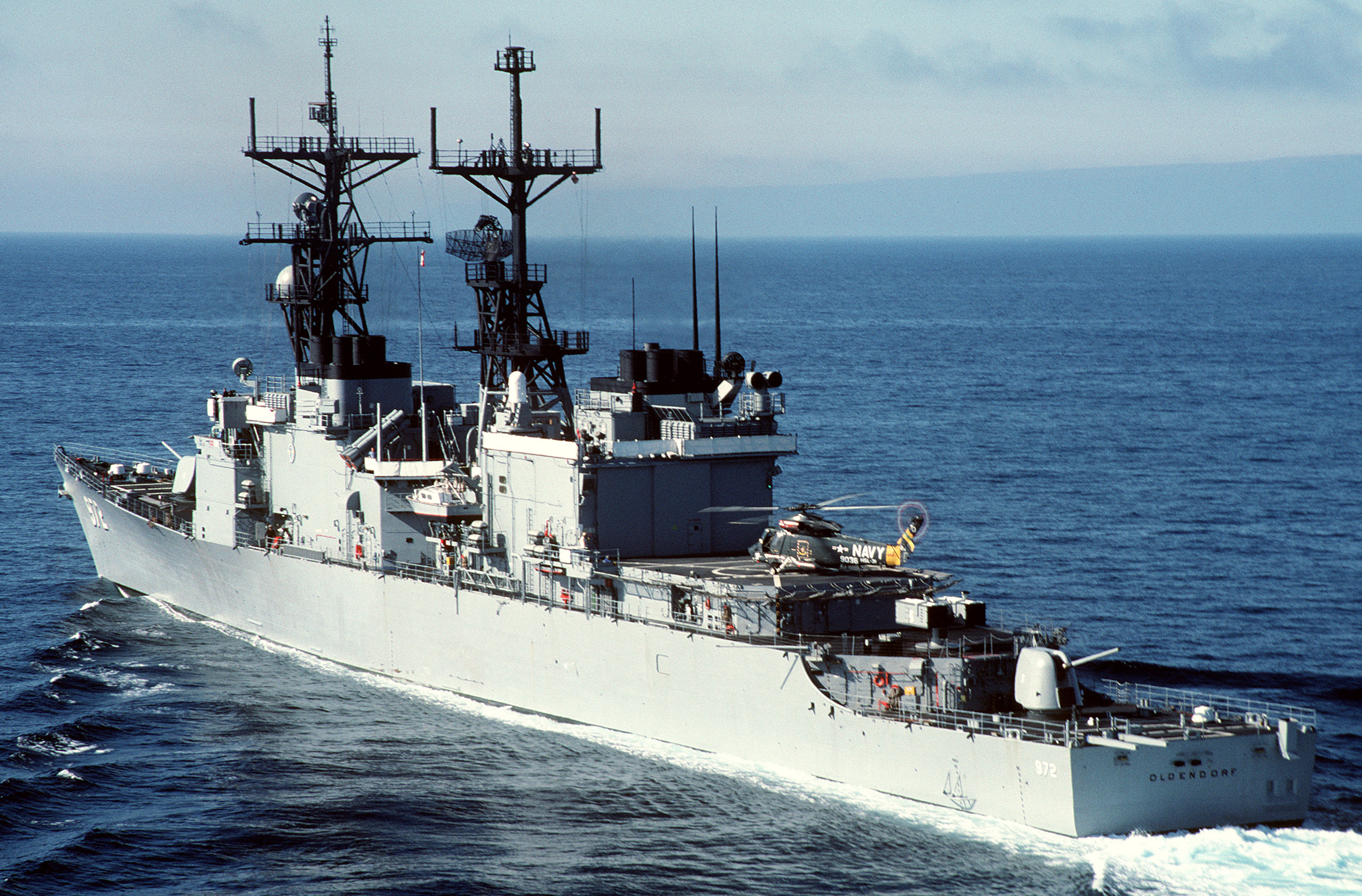
Oldendorf underway c.1984.

Oldendorf took part, from 13 April through 24 April in Pacific Joint Task Force Exercise 98-1 (PAC JTFEX 98–1) off the Southern California coast. The aim of the exercise was to prepare naval forces to participate in joint operations with other U.S. forces. Naval operations included Maritime Interception Operations (MIO), Non-Combatant Evacuation Operations (NEO), various air strike and support missions, operational testing of various weapons systems, Theater Ballistic Missile Defense (TBMD), logistics support, search and rescue, and command and control. An amphibious landing at Camp Pendleton, California, on 21 April, involved Navy surface and helicopter assault forces, U.S. Air Force aircraft, as well as units from Canada, Australia and the United Kingdom.

Oldendorf deployed on 9 November 1998, for a six-month overseas assignment, as part of the USS Carl Vinson battle group. Joining Carl Vinson was the USS Boxer Amphibious Ready Group (ARG). The Carl Vinson battle group and the Boxer ARG were to relieve the USS Abraham Lincoln battle group and the USS Essex ARG, which had been forward deployed for the previous five months to the Western Pacific, Indian Ocean and the Persian Gulf.

Oldendorf arrived on station in the Persian Gulf with the Carl Vinson battle group and took part in Operation Desert Fox in December 1998. The operation was designed to degrade Saddam Hussein's ability to deliver chemical, biological and nuclear weapons, and wage war against his neighbors. It also took part in Operation Southern Watch. The Carl Vinson battle group, led by Carl Vinson and Carrier Air Wing (CVW) Eleven departed the Persian Gulf on 18 March 1999, after spending three intense months supporting Operations Southern Watch and Desert Fox in Southern Iraq. The ships returned home in May.

As of early 2000, developmental tests were in progress on Oldendorf as part of the SPQ-9B Radar Improvement Program. The program aimed at using COTS systems and NDI to improve the performance of the AN/SPQ-9 Radar in the Mk 86 Gun Fire Control System (GFCS), which would be integrated into the Mk 1 Ship Self-Defense System.

In August 2000, Oldendorf was directed to the scene of a crash into the Persian Gulf, on 23 August, by a commercial passenger jet, in order to assist in the recovery of the flight data recorder and the cockpit voice recorder. The jet, a twin-engine Airbus A320 operated by Gulf Air which originated in Cairo, plunged into shallow water about 3 to 4 miles north of Bahrain International Airport while making its approach. Oldendorf was relieved of this duty by USS George Washington, which was much closer to the proximity of the site of the crash. The bodies of all 143 people aboard the aircraft were recovered.

Oldendorf took part in the first Joint Task Force Exercise (JTFEX) of 2001 during the month of February. Together with the Special Operations Capable certification (SOCCERT), the JTFEX aimed at providing progressive and realistic pre-deployment training for a carrier battle group, an amphibious ready group, a Marine Expeditionary Unit and other deployers. The name Joint Task Force Exercise reflects the focus on preparing naval forces to participate fully in joint operations with other U.S. forces and the armed forces of allied countries. Naval operations included Maritime Interdiction Operations (MIO), Non-Combatant Evacuation Operations (NEO), various air strike and support missions, operational testing of various weapons systems, Theater Ballistic Missile Defense (TBMD), logistics support, search and rescue and command and control. U.S. Navy and Marine Corps forces were joined in the exercise by U.S. Air Force aircraft as well as units from Canada.

== Sea swap ==
The U.S. Navy Surface Force was scheduled to begin, in the summer of 2002, an initiative to test the effectiveness of deploying a single ship for 18 months while swapping out crews at six-month intervals. Called Sea Swap, this initial two-phased initiative would involve three Spruance-class destroyers (DDs) – USS Fletcher, Kinkaid and Oldendorf, and three Arleigh Burke-class destroyers (DDGs) – Higgins, John Paul Jones and Benfold. For the DD phase, Fletcher and her crew would deploy with their battle group this summer, but after six months, only the crew would return. The ship would remain deployed and be crewed by sailors from Kinkaid. After completing their training cycle and decommissioning Kinkaid, these sailors would fly to a port in either Australia or Singapore to assume ownership of Fletcher and steam her back on-station. After six months, they would be replaced by the crew from Oldendorf who would have completed the same training and decommissioning schedule with their ship before flying out to relieve the Kinkaid crew. After four more months on station, the Oldendorf crew would then bring Fletcher back to the United States where it too would be decommissioned. Additionally, by executing this plan, the Navy would be able to eliminate the deployment of USS Paul F. Foster because the additional on-station time generated by swapping out the crews meant a ship would already be in theater meeting that requirement.

Oldendorf was decommissioned 20 June 2003 and berthed at Bremerton, Washington NISMF. She was stricken 6 April 2004. The ship was sunk as a target during a live-fire exercise off the coast of Washington by the USS Russell on 22 August 2005

== Ship's crest ==
The design of the Oldendorf crest is composite of emblems representing Admiral Oldendorf's achievements during his illustrious career. The shield commemorates Admiral Oldendorf's crossing of the "T" in the epic sea Battle of Surigao Strait during World War II, which resulted in a brilliant and decisive victory for the United States.

The vertical blue bar, alluding to a narrow passage or waterway, refers to Surigao Strait, and the eight red and white sections of the background represents the total losses of the enemy in terms of the number of ships sunk, damaged or crippled. The blue chief at the top crossing of the "T" battle plan, with upper section simulating red sky over the night battle of Surigao Strait. The four stars denote Admiral Oldendorf's highest rank. The crest symbolizes the award of the Navy Cross, The Navy's highest decoration, awarded to Admiral Oldendorf for exceptional leadership and heroism in the Battle of Surigao Strait. The trident signifies authority and power and the annulet with red center suggest the muzzle of a gun in action. The two wavy bars are indicative of World War II and the Pacific area. The ship's motto, "Ad Proelium Victoriamque Futuram" (To the Fight and Victory Ahead) is the Latin translation of a line taken from Admiral Oldendorf's memoirs regarding his charge to his forces on the eve of the decisive Battle of Surigao Strait.

== Gallery ==
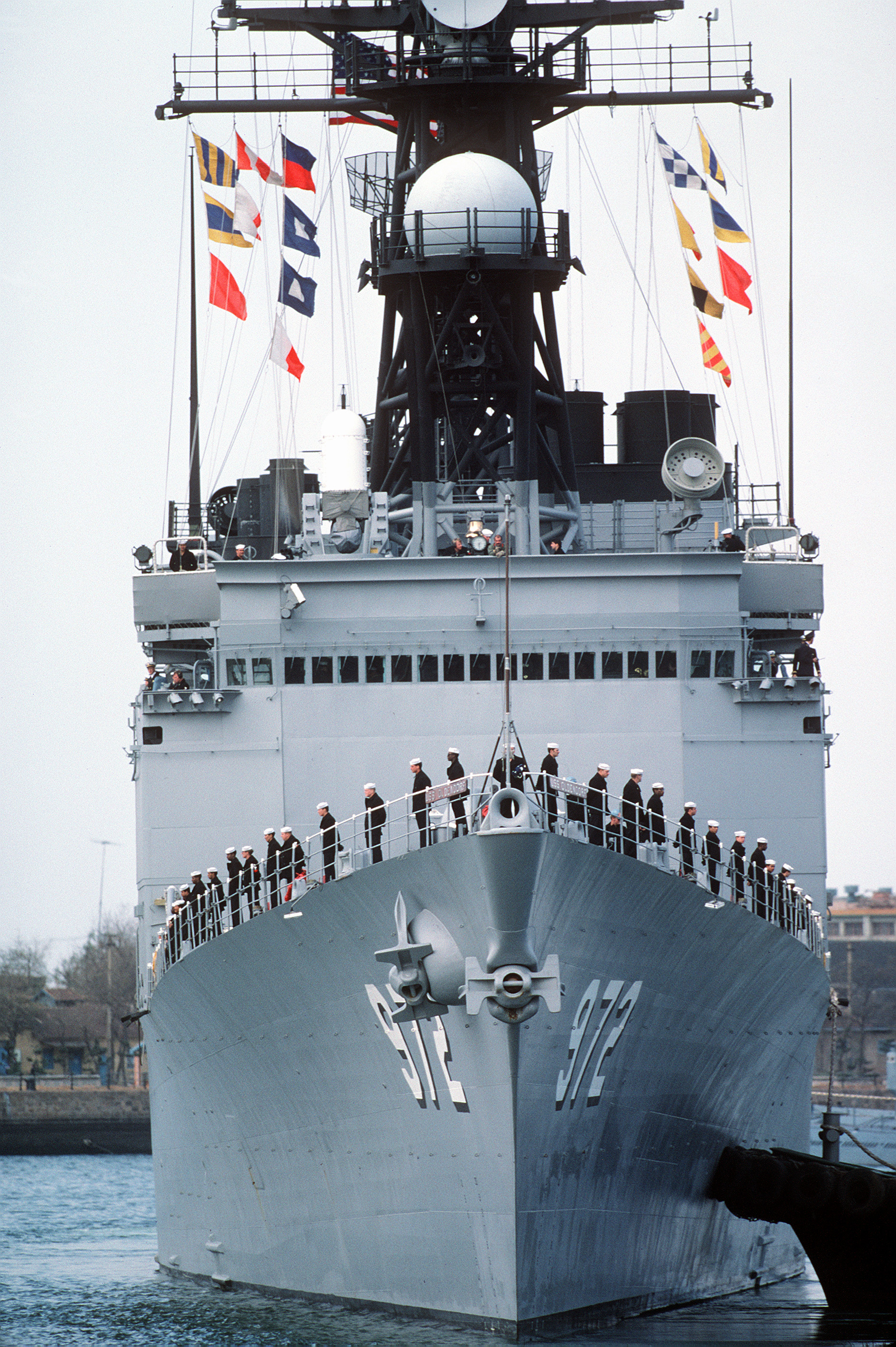
USS Oldendorf on 5 November 1986

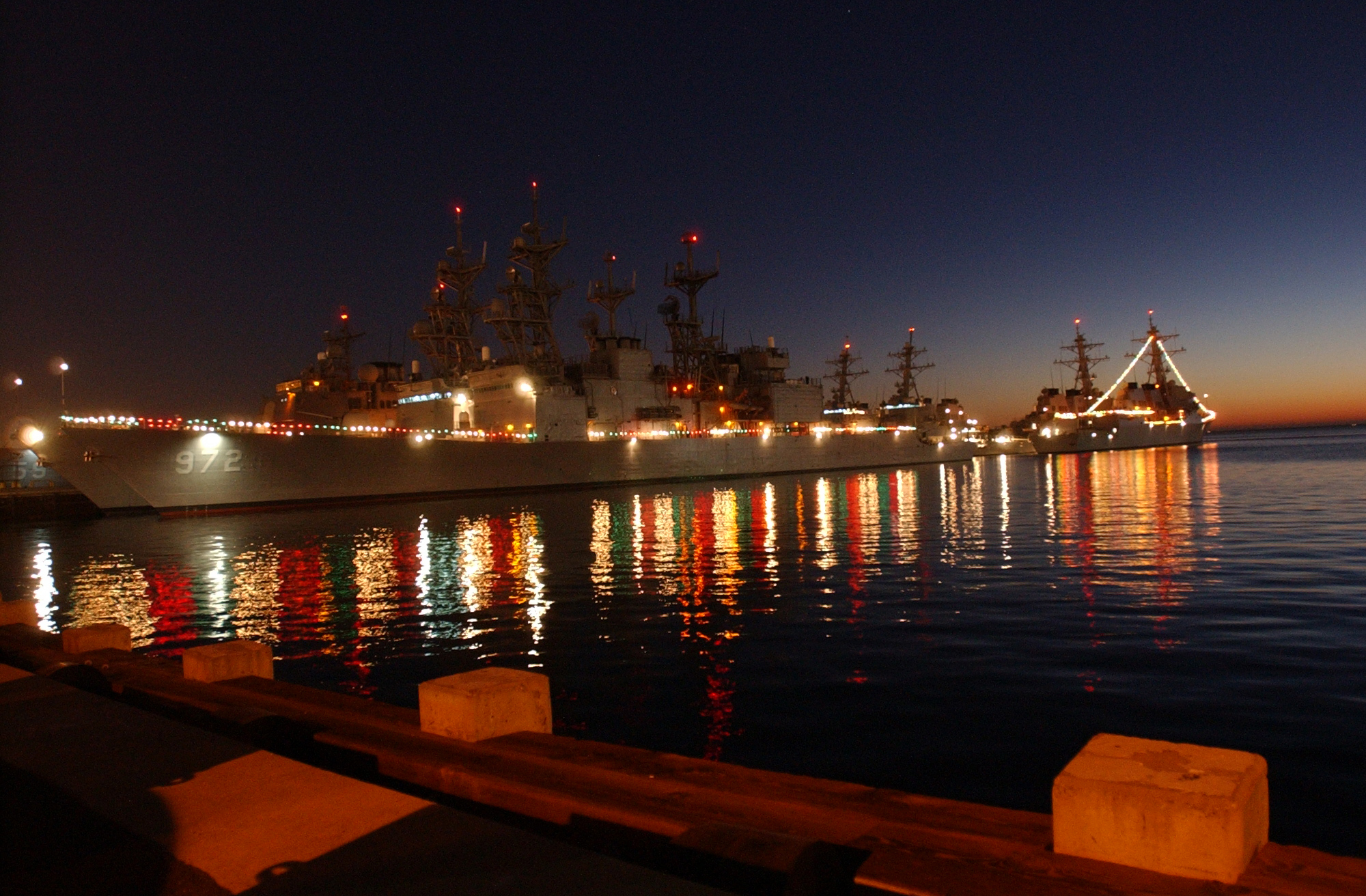
USS Oldendorf on 1 January 2003
