= Spruance-class destroyer =

Destroyer class of the US Navy

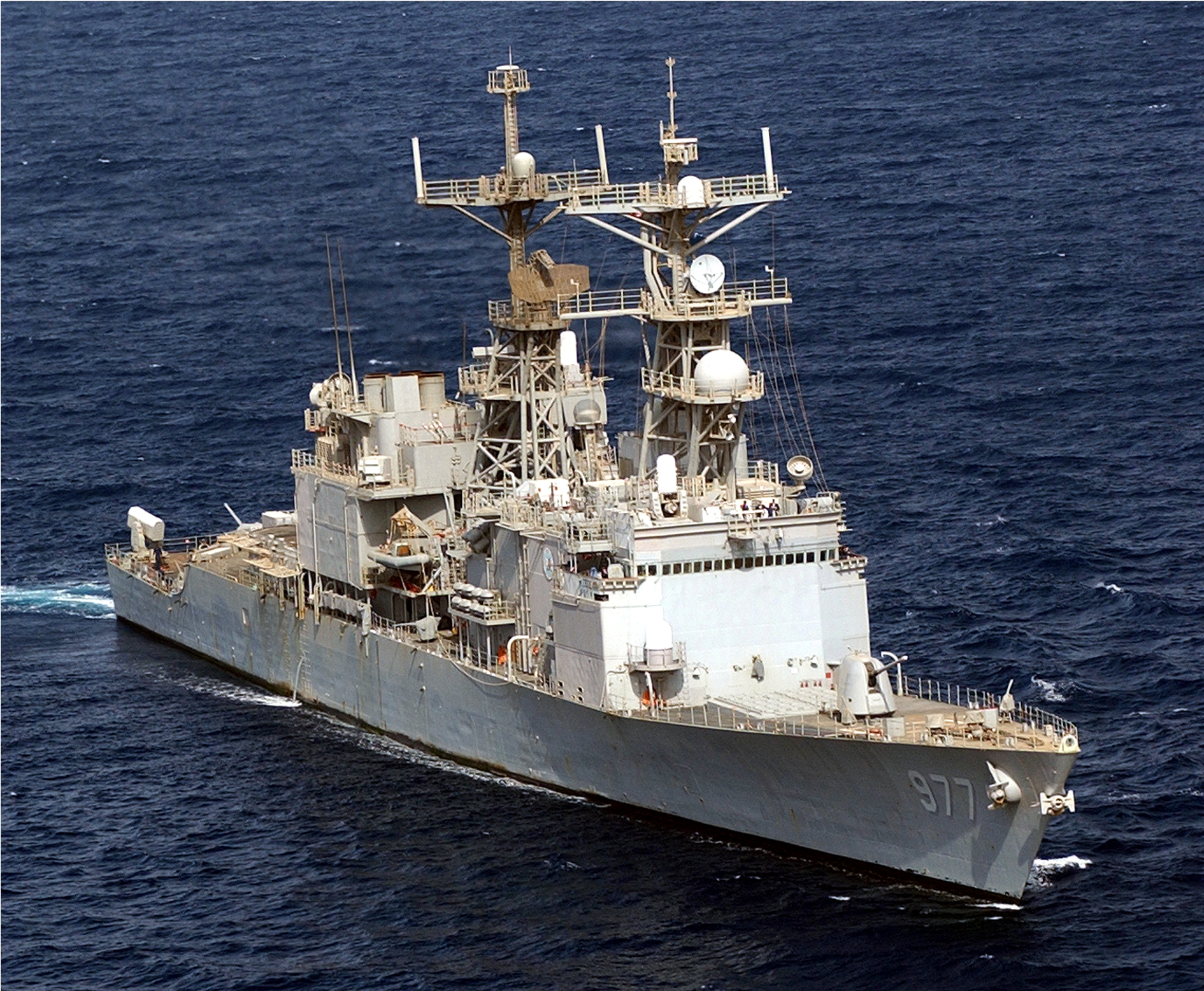
- USS Briscoe on 21 March 2003

Class overview
- Name: Spruance class
- Builders: Ingalls Shipbuilding, Pascagoula, Mississippi
- Operators: United States Navy
- Preceded by: Charles F. Adams class
- Succeeded by: Kidd class; Arleigh Burke class
- Built: 1972–1983
- In commission: 1975–2005
- Completed: 31
- Active: 1 ex-Paul F. Foster (EDD-964) as SDTS
- Retired: 30

General characteristics
- Class & type: Spruance-class destroyer
- Displacement: 8,040 long tons (8,170 t) full load
- Length: 529 ft (161 m) waterline; 563 ft (172 m) overall
- Beam: 55 ft (17 m)
- Draft: 29 ft (8.8 m)
- Installed power: 3 × 501-K17 generator sets (2,000 kW (2,700 hp) each)
- Propulsion: 4 × General Electric LM2500 gas turbines, 2 shafts, 80,000 shp (60 MW)
- Speed: 32.5 knots (60.2 km/h; 37.4 mph)
- Range: 6,000 nmi (11,000 km; 6,900 mi) at 20 knots (37 km/h; 23 mph)
- Complement: 19 officers, 315 enlisted
- Sensors & processing systems: AN/SPS-40 air search radar; AN/SPG-60 fire control radar; AN/SPS-55 surface search radar; AN/SPQ-9 gun fire control radar; Mark 23 TAS automatic detection and tracking radar; AN/SPS-65 missile fire control radar; AN/SQS-53 bow-mounted active sonar; AN/SQR-19 TACTAS towed array passive sonar; Naval Tactical Data System
- Electronic warfare & decoys: AN/SLQ-32 electronic warfare system; AN/SLQ-25 Nixie torpedo countermeasures; Mark 36 SRBOC decoy launching system; AN/SLQ-49 inflatable decoys
- Armament: 2 × 5 in (127 mm) 54 caliber Mark 45 dual purpose guns; 2 × 20 mm Phalanx CIWS Mark 15 guns; 1 × 8 cell ASROC launcher (removed); 1 × 8 cell NATO Sea Sparrow Mark 29 missile launcher; 2 × quadruple Harpoon missile canisters; 2 × Mark 32 triple 12.75 in (324 mm) torpedo tubes (Mk 46 torpedoes); 1 × 61 cell Mk 41 VLS launcher for Tomahawk missiles
- Aircraft carried: 2 × Sikorsky SH-60 Seahawk LAMPS III helicopters
- Aviation facilities: Flight deck and enclosed hangar for up to two medium-lift helicopters

The Spruance-class destroyer was developed by the United States to replace the many World War II–built Allen M. Sumner- and Gearing-class destroyers, and was the primary destroyer built for the United States Navy during the 1970s and 1980s. It was named in honor of U.S. Navy Admiral Raymond A. Spruance, who successfully led major naval battles in the Asiatic-Pacific Theater during World War II such as the Battle of Midway and the Battle of the Philippine Sea.

Introduced in 1975, the class was designed with gas-turbine propulsion, a flight deck and hangar for up to two medium-lift helicopters, all-digital weapons, and automated 127 mm (5-inch) guns. The Spruance class was originally designed to escort a carrier group, primarily for anti-submarine warfare (ASW), with point-defense anti-aircraft warfare (AAW) missiles and limited anti-ship capabilities. Two dozen members of the class were upgraded with Tomahawk cruise missiles for land attack. The Navy retired the class somewhat earlier than planned, decommissioning the last ship in 2005. Most Spruances were broken up or destroyed as targets. Its hull form and propulsion plant were adopted as the foundation of the Kidd-class destroyers and the Ticonderoga-class cruisers constructed in the 1980s. The class was succeeded as the main U.S. destroyer by the Arleigh Burke-class destroyer.

== History ==
=== Design ===
Much larger than other destroyers of the era, the Spruances were comparable in size to contemporary guided-missile cruisers (CG and CGN) and U.S. Navy light cruisers (CL) in World War II. This allowed them to accommodate a helicopter flight deck, a first for a U.S. Navy destroyer, and an enclosed hangar with space for up to two medium-lift helicopters, a first for a U.S. Navy destroyer or cruiser. The "Spru-cans" were the first large U.S. Navy ships to use gas turbine propulsion: four General Electric LM2500 gas turbines that generated about 80,000 horsepower (60 MW). This configuration (developed in the 1960s by the Royal Canadian Navy for the Iroquois-class destroyers and known as COmbined Gas And Gas, or COGAG) was very successful and used on most subsequent U.S. warships. As of 2010, all U.S. Navy surface combatants (except nuclear-powered aircraft carriers and the LCS-1) used the LM2500 COGAG arrangement, usually with two turbines per shaft.

The ships were initially controversial, especially among members of the United States Congress who believed that their unimposing looks, and their original armament of two guns and an ASROC and Sea Sparrow missile launcher, implied that the vessels were weak compared to Soviet designs that carried large numbers of anti-ship missiles. The Spruance class was also unfavorably compared to earlier U.S. designs that had more visible guns or launchers for Standard medium-range missiles. Their advocates noted that they were successful in their intended ASW role due to their seaworthiness, quiet operation, and ability to operate two helicopters.

The Spruance class received the "DD" designation in the hull classification symbol system which was previously applied to gun destroyers, although their primary armament as designed was missiles. However, their original complement of 8 Sea Sparrow anti-aircraft missiles was only sufficient for point defense, compared to other American destroyers designated as DDG which were designed to provide anti-aircraft warfare screening to the fleet, while some newer DDG ships further added surface-to-surface capabilities for anti-ship or land strike. In the early 1980s, the class received quadruple Harpoon missile launchers that were installed amidships. Six members of the class received Armored Box Launchers for Tomahawk surface-to-surface missiles, while a major update from the mid-1980s for 24 members of the class added a 61-cell Vertical Launch System (VLS) for the Tomahawk. Despite these upgrades, the class retained their DD classification as they lacked the area anti-aircraft capabilities of guided-missile cruisers (CG and CGN) and destroyers (DDG).

=== Contracts ===
Until the class was named for Admiral Spruance, the acquisition effort had been known as the DX program. It aimed to award the production contract for the entire class of 30 ships to a single shipyard, under the Total Package Procurement concept originated by the Whiz Kids of Robert McNamara's Pentagon. The idea was to reap the benefits of mass construction. After a selection process "noted for political influence and shifting rules," the entire contract was awarded on 23 June 1970 to the Litton-Ingalls shipyard in Pascagoula, Mississippi. Labor and technical problems caused cost overruns and delayed construction.

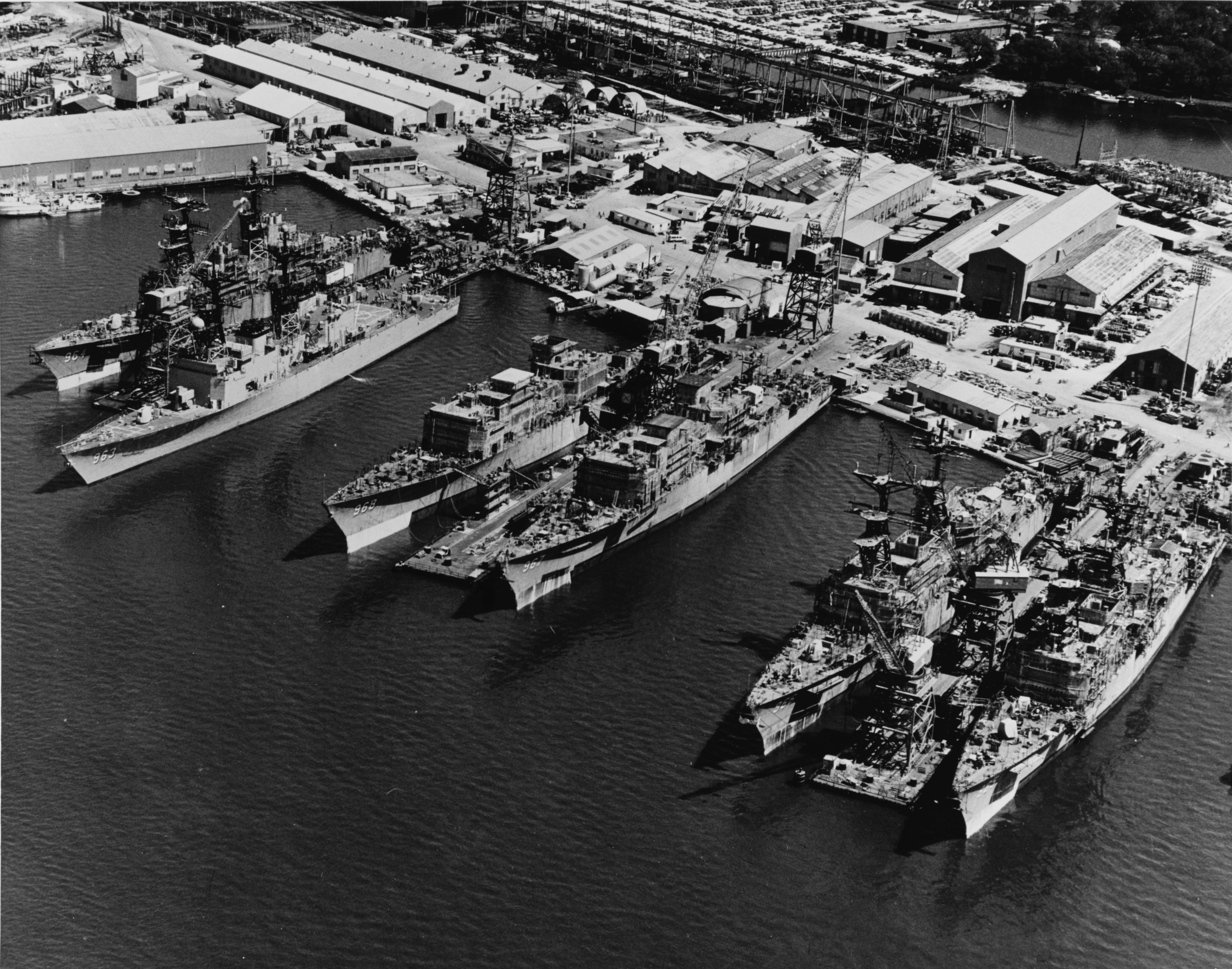
Six Spruance-class destroyers fitting out, c. May 1975

One additional ship, USS Hayler, was ordered on 29 September 1979. Hayler was originally planned as a DDH (Destroyer, Helicopter) design, which would carry more anti-submarine helicopters than the standard design of the Spruance class. Eventually this plan to build a DDH was scrapped and a slightly modified DD-963 class hull was put in commission.

Four additional ships were built originally for the Iranian Navy with the Mark 26/Standard AAW missile system and commissioned as the Kidds for the U.S. Navy. The Kidd-class destroyers used the same hull as the Spruances but they were more advanced general-purpose ships with area anti-air warfare capabilities that the Spruance class lacked. It was once planned to build all of the Spruance class up to this standard, but it was too expensive. A slightly lengthened version of the hull was also used for the Ticonderoga-class cruisers, originally planned as DDG-47-class destroyers but redesignated as cruisers in 1980 to emphasize the additional capability provided by the ships' Aegis combat systems, and their flag facilities suitable for an admiral and his staff.

An air-capable mini V/STOL aircraft carrier with fighters and ASW helicopters based on the Spruance hull was seriously considered but not produced.

=== Upgrades ===
The Spruance design is modular in nature, allowing for easy installation of entire subsystems within the ship. Although originally designed for anti-submarine warfare, seven vessels—Comte de Grasse, Merrill, Conolly, John Rodgers, Leftwich, Deyo, and Ingersoll—were initially upgraded with the installation of pair of four-round Armored Box Launchers (ABL) for the Tomahawk cruise missile, one each side of the ASROC launcher, giving them a land attack capability. 23 of the remaining vessels then received a more comprehensive upgrade with the installation of a 61-cell Mark 41 Vertical Launch Missile System (VLS) forward, replacing the ASROC launcher and allowing for a greater weapons load to be carried. One of the ABL ships, Deyo, also received the VLS upgrade while Harry W. Hill was the only Spruance that did not receive the Tomahawk as its VLS upgrade was cancelled. Hill and the remaining 6 ABL-equipped ships were the first of the class to be withdrawn from service.

- Merrill served as the Navy's test platform for the Tomahawk Cruise Missile Program receiving armored box launchers and test launching a Tomahawk on 19 March 1980. Merrill carried two ABLs and an ASROC launcher into the 1990s until the ASROC launcher was removed.
- David R. Ray tested the RAM system in the 1980s, but had the system removed after the tests.
- Oldendorf was the test platform for the AN/SPQ-9B Anti-ship Missile Defense (ASMD) Fire control Radar to be outfitted on the San Antonio-class amphibious transport docks. The AN/SPQ-9B is used to detect all known and projected sea-skimming missiles.
- Arthur W. Radford tested the Advanced Enclosed Mast/Sensor system which helped in the mast design of the San Antonio-class amphibious transport dock ships.

At least ten VLS ships, including Elliot, John Young, Briscoe, Cushing, O'Bannon, Thorn, and Fife had a 21-cell Mark 49 RIM-116 Rolling Airframe Missile launcher mounted on the starboard fantail.

Spruance-class destroyers fired 112 land attack Tomahawks during Operation Desert Storm.

=== Decommissioning ===
In order to save $28 million a year, the Navy accelerated the decommissioning of the Spruance class, though they could have served to 2019 had they been maintained and updated. Despite the recent modifications to the Spruance and Kidd classes, they were still considered expensive and manpower-intensive to operate, while the succeeding Arleigh Burke class were more capable and versatile due to their Aegis combat system while also being more cost-efficient, and by the end of the 1990s, many Arleigh Burke-class destroyers had entered the fleet. While the early Flight I Arleigh Burke ships only had a flight deck, Flight IIA and subsequent vessels added the enclosed hangar which made their aviation facilities comparable to the Spruance class.

The Navy planned to replace its current destroyers and cruisers with the new Zumwalt-class (DDG-1000) destroyers, but the 2010 Defense budget funded the construction of only three DDG-1000s. Production of Arleigh Burke class continued and it became the U.S. Navy's only operational class of destroyers after the USS Cushing, the last Spruance-class destroyer on active service, was decommissioned on 21 September 2005. Cushing was unsuccessfully offered to the Pakistan Navy before being sunk as a target on 29 April 2009. The four Kidd-class destroyers were decommissioned in 1998 and were sold to Taiwan in 2005 and 2006.

Few Spruances were preserved in storage like some older classes or offered up for sale to foreign navies. Some were broken up and almost all of the rest were sunk as targets in various fleet exercises. The exception is the ex-Paul F. Foster, which replaced the ex-Decatur in 2005 as the Self Defense Test Ship. The remote-controlled SDTS tows a target barge, allowing crews to fire live weapons at a ship-like moving target.

== Ships in class ==
Ships of the Spruance destroyer class
Name	Hull no.	Crest	Laid down	Launched	Commissioned	Decommissioned	Disposition	Ref
Spruance	DD-963		27 November 1972	10 November 1973	20 September 1975	23 March 2005	Sunk as target, 8 December 2006	
Paul F. Foster	DD-964		6 February 1973	22 February 1974	21 February 1976	27 March 2003	Struck 6 April 2004; in use as a Self Defense Test Ship	
Kinkaid	DD-965		19 April 1973	25 May 1974	10 July 1976	7 January 2003	Sunk as target, 14 July 2004	
Hewitt	DD-966		23 July 1973	24 August 1974	25 September 1976	19 July 2001	Sold for scrap, 9 August 2001	
Elliot	DD-967		15 October 1973	19 December 1974	22 January 1977	2 December 2003	Sunk as target, 25 June 2005	
Arthur W. Radford	DD-968		31 January 1974	1 March 1975	16 April 1977	18 March 2003	Scuttled as artificial reef off coast of Delaware, 10 August 2011	
Peterson	DD-969		29 April 1974	21 June 1975	9 July 1977	4 October 2002	Sunk as target, 16 February 2004	
Caron	DD-970		1 July 1974	24 June 1975	1 October 1977	15 October 2001	Sunk as target, 4 December 2002	
David R. Ray	DD-971		23 September 1974	23 August 1975	19 November 1977	28 February 2002	Sunk as target, 11 July 2008	
Oldendorf	DD-972		27 December 1974	21 October 1975	4 March 1978	20 June 2003	Sunk as target, 22 August 2005	
John Young	DD-973		17 February 1975	6 January 1976	20 May 1978	30 September 2002	Sunk as target, 13 April 2004	
Comte de Grasse	DD-974		4 April 1975	26 March 1976	5 August 1978	5 June 1998	Sunk as target, 7 June 2006	
O'Brien	DD-975		9 May 1975	8 July 1976	3 December 1977	24 September 2004	Sunk as target, 9 February 2006	
Merrill	DD-976		16 June 1975	1 September 1976	11 March 1978	26 March 1998	Sunk as target, 1 August 2003	
Briscoe	DD-977		21 July 1975	28 December 1976	3 June 1978	2 October 2003	Sunk as target, 25 August 2005	
Stump	DD-978		25 August 1975	1 January 1977	19 August 1978	22 October 2004	Sunk as target, 7 June 2006	
Conolly	DD-979		29 September 1975	3 June 1977	14 October 1978	18 September 1998	Sunk as target, 29 April 2009	
Moosbrugger	DD-980		3 November 1975	23 July 1977	16 December 1978	15 December 2000	Scrapped, 2006	
John Hancock	DD-981		16 January 1976	29 October 1977	10 March 1979	16 October 2000	Scrapped, 2007	
Nicholson	DD-982		20 February 1976	11 November 1977	12 May 1979	20 December 2002	Sunk as target, 30 July 2004	
John Rodgers	DD-983		12 August 1976	25 February 1978	14 July 1979	4 September 1998	Scrapped, 2006	
Leftwich	DD-984		12 November 1976	8 April 1978	25 August 1979	27 March 1998	Sunk as target, 1 August 2003	
Cushing	DD-985		2 February 1977	17 June 1978	21 September 1979	21 September 2005	Sunk as target, 14 July 2008	
Harry W. Hill	DD-986		1 April 1977	10 August 1978	17 November 1979	29 May 1998	Sunk as target, 15 July 2004	
O'Bannon	DD-987		21 February 1977	25 September 1978	15 December 1979	19 August 2005	Sunk as target, 6 October 2008	
Thorn	DD-988		29 August 1977	3 February 1979	16 February 1980	25 August 2004	Sunk as target, 22 July 2006	
Deyo	DD-989		14 October 1977	20 January 1979	22 March 1980	6 November 2003	Sunk as target, 25 August 2005	
Ingersoll	DD-990		5 December 1977	10 March 1979	12 April 1980	24 July 1998	Sunk as target, 29 July 2003	
Fife	DD-991		6 March 1978	1 May 1979	31 May 1980	28 February 2003	Sunk as target, 23 August 2005	
Fletcher	DD-992		24 April 1978	16 June 1979	12 July 1980	1 October 2004	Sunk as target, 16 July 2008	
Hayler	DD-997		20 October 1980	2 March 1982	5 March 1983	25 August 2003	Sunk as target, 13 November 2004	

== Gallery ==
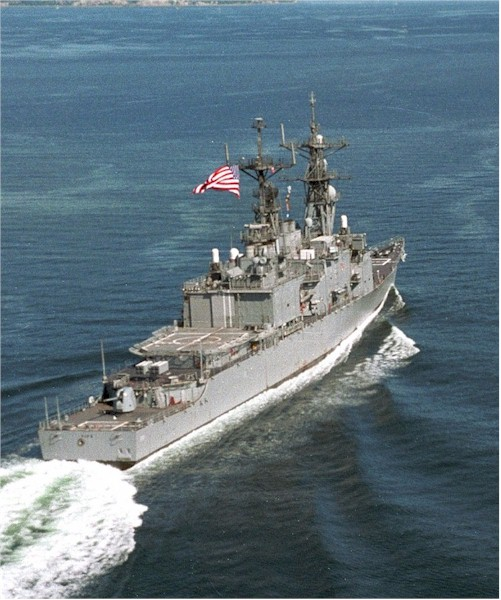
starboard quarter view of Fife

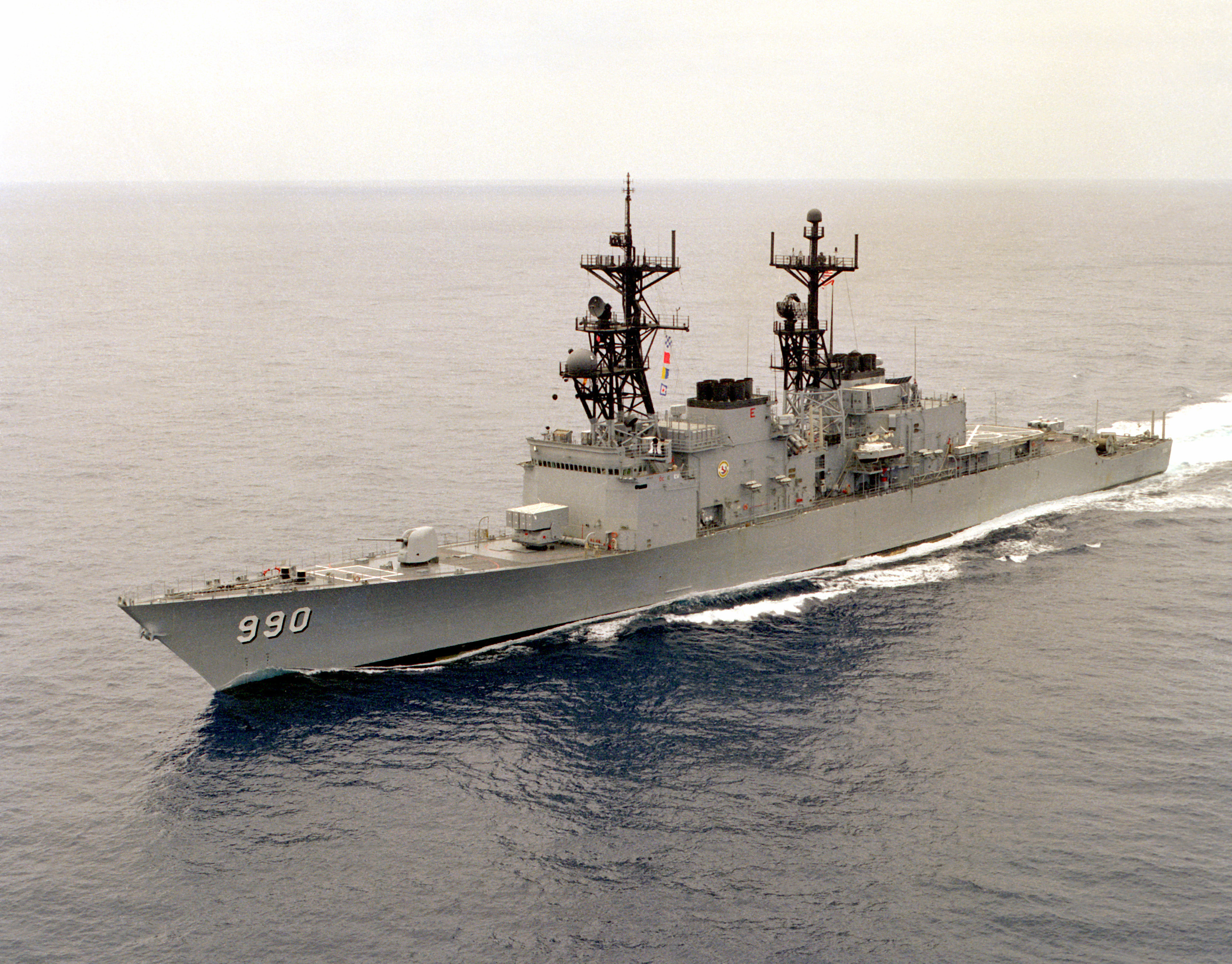
Ingersoll with only ASROC launcher forward, as all destroyers were initially built. Image also shows an example of black masts and no Phalanx CIWS

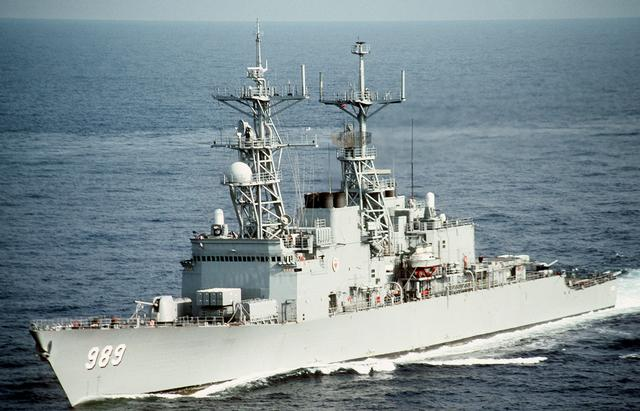
Deyo with ASROC and ABL's forward.

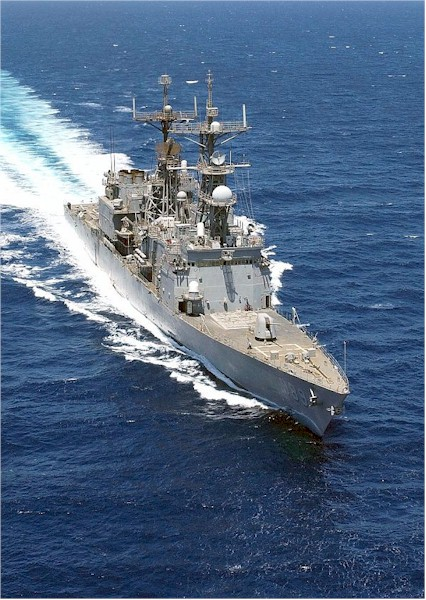
starboard bow view of Deyo, VLS equipped

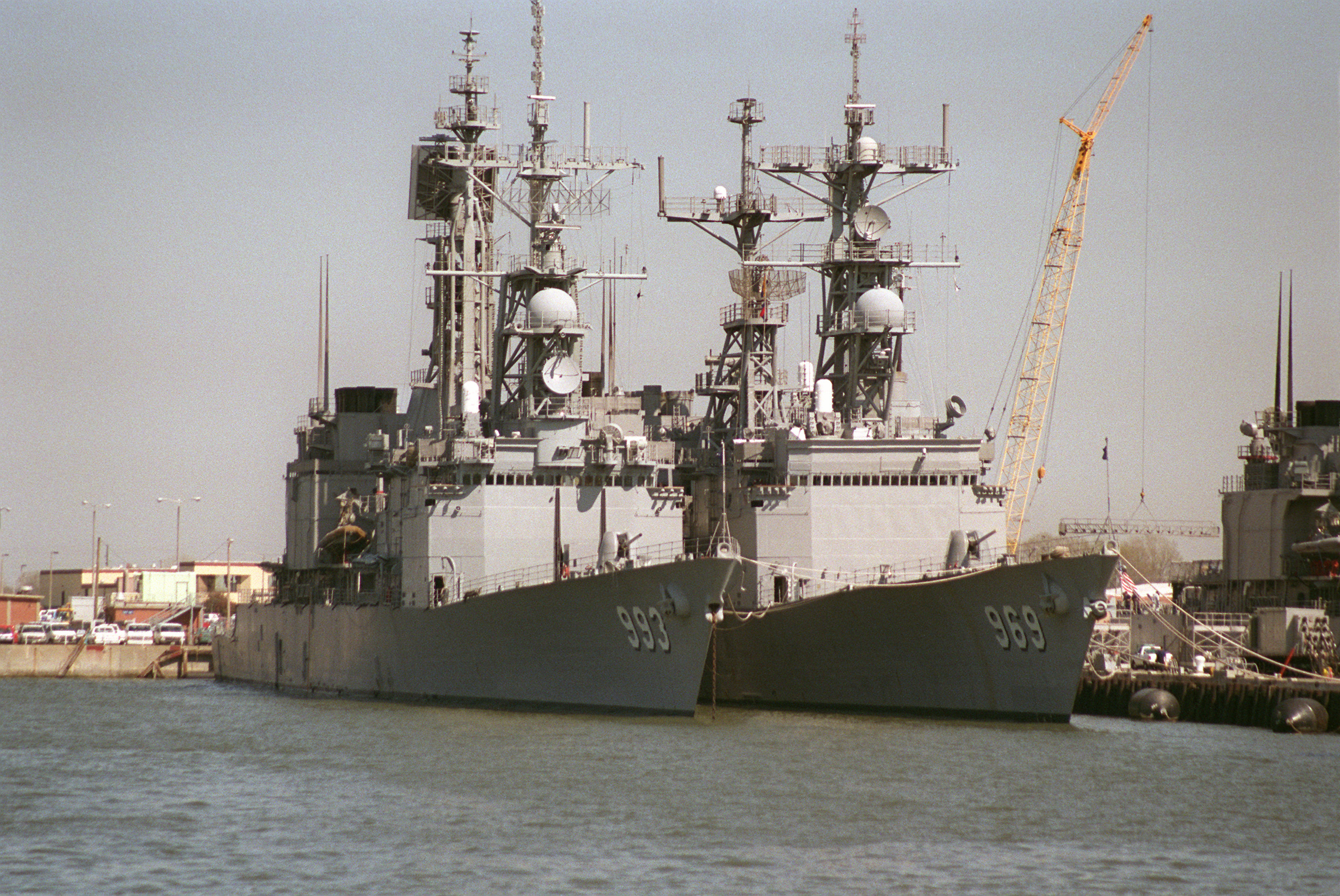
Kidd class (left) compared to Spruance class

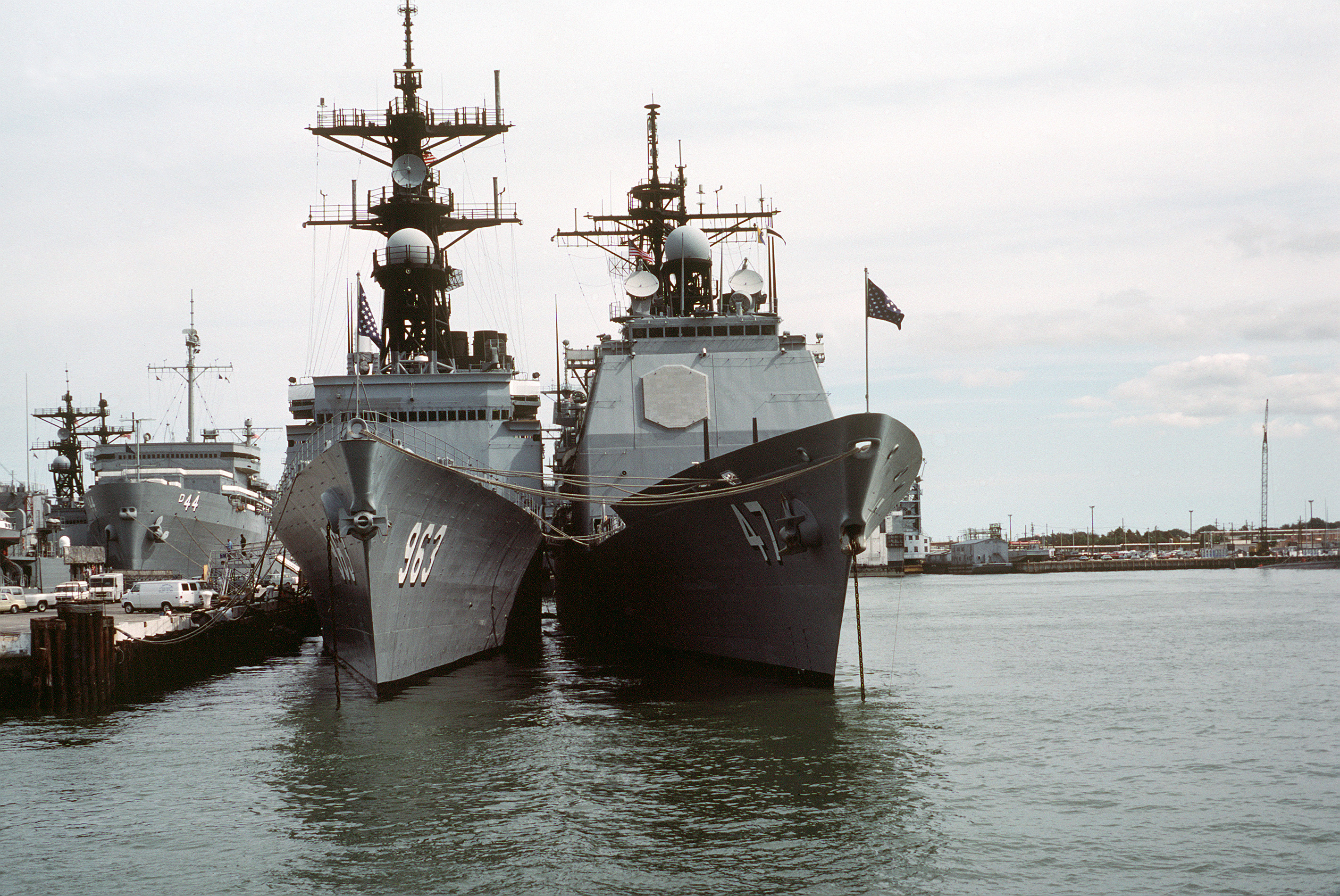
Ticonderoga-class cruiser (right) compared to the Spruance class

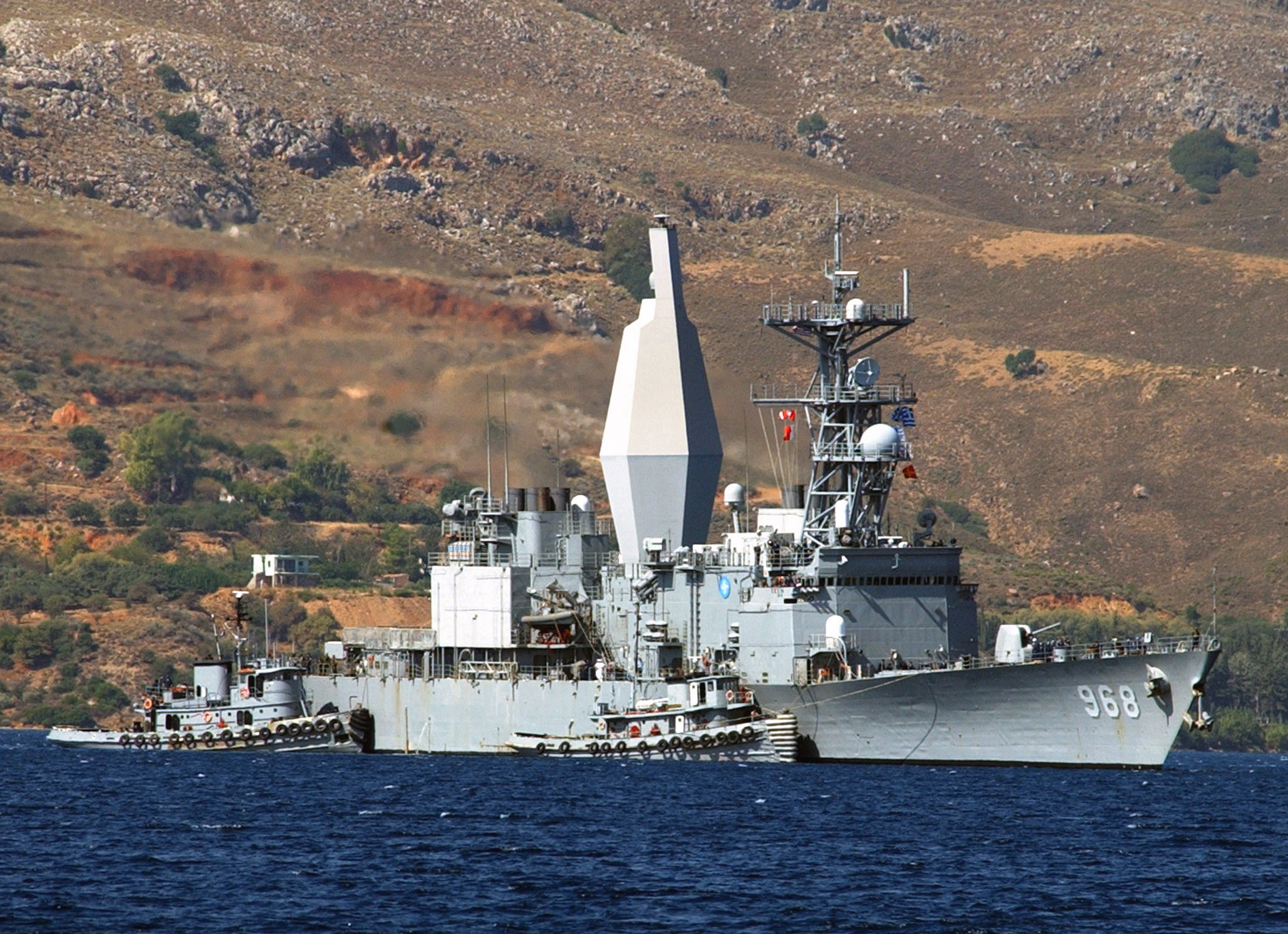
Arthur W. Radford with experimental mast

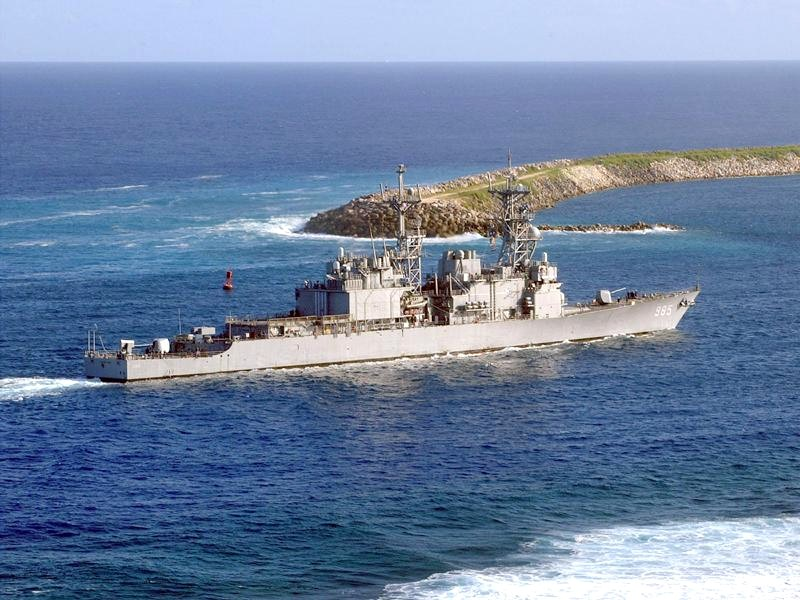
Cushing with VLS forward and RAM launcher on fantail

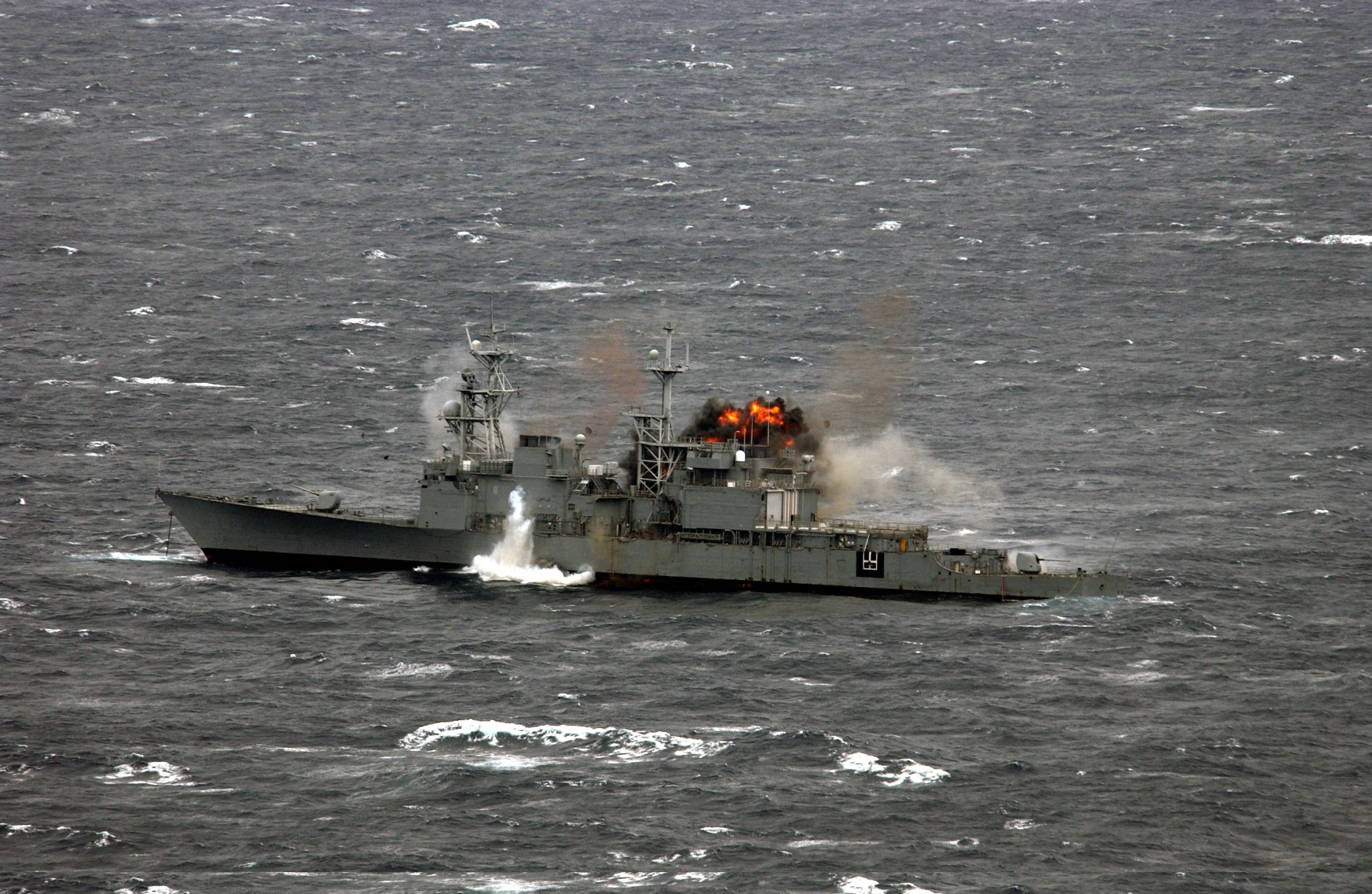
Hayler, the last Spruance destroyer to be built, is sunk

== See also ==
- List of destroyer classes

Equivalent destroyers of the same era

- Sovremenny class
- Type 42
- Audace class
- Tachikaze class
- Iroquois class
- Gangwon class
- Type 051
