= USS Decatur =

Five ships of the United States Navy have been named Decatur, in honor of Commodore Stephen Decatur.

- USS Decatur (1839), was a sloop-of-war built in 1839 and in service from 1840 to 1859.
- USS Decatur (DD-5), was a Bainbridge-class destroyer which served mainly in or near the Philippines from 1902 to 1919.
- USS Decatur (DD-341), was a Clemson-class destroyer which served from 1922 to 1945.
- USS Decatur (DD-936), was a Forrest Sherman-class destroyer in service from 1956 to 1983, later converted to become the first Self Defense Test Ship.
- USS Decatur (DDG-73), is an Arleigh Burke-class destroyer commissioned in 1998 and currently in active service.
