= Naval Surface Warfare Center Port Hueneme =

Division of the U.S. Naval Surface Warfare Center

Naval Surface Warfare Center, Port Hueneme Division
- Part of United States Navy

Location
- Coordinates: 34°09′13.164″N 119°12′52.427″W

Naval Surface Warfare Center, Port Hueneme Division (NSWC PHD) is a tenant command located at Naval Base Ventura County in Port Hueneme, California and is a component of the United States Navy's Naval Sea Systems Command (NAVSEA). In addition to its primary location at Port Hueneme, the division operates detachments at White Sands, New Mexico; Virginia Beach, Virginia; and Louisville, Kentucky.

== History ==
NSWC PHD was founded in 1963 as the Naval Ship Missile Systems Engineering Station. It was established to provide overall technical support for the new guided missiles—RIM-2 Terrier, RIM-8 Talos and RIM-24 Tartar—that were being introduced into the naval fleet. Port Hueneme was chosen as the site for this operation because of its deep water port, its proximity to the US Navy's missile testing range at Point Mugu, California and the availability of space at the already operating Naval Construction Battalion Center Port Hueneme.

Chartered as an In-Service Engineering Agent, the newly established organization emphasized onboard assistance to ship crews, analyzed problems and requirements and developed engineering and logistics improvements to the guided missile systems. The command's engineering responsibilities soon expanded beyond missiles, assuming engineering work for many new weapon and combat systems used by the Navy's surface fleet. The workforce also took on the responsibility of providing logistics support—referring to the procurement, maintenance and transportation of what the fleet needed—including maintenance and repair, training manuals, essential spare parts, tools and test equipment. The command also adopted the program of underway replenishment, which allows ships to receive fuel, ammunition and supplies while at sea.

The command supports new technologies and innovations to sustain a wide variety of weapon, combat and warfare systems. NSWC PHD is focusing its technical capabilities on next generation in-service engineering, which involves direct connectivity to the fleet on a global basis and the immediate availability of round-the-clock access to products, services and fleet support capabilities.

== Services ==
NSWC PHD's Technical Capabilities include in-service engineering, test and evaluation and integrated logistics support for the following:

- Strike force interoperability theater warfare systems
- Surface combat systems
- Surface warfare systems
- Underway replenishment systems
- Surface gun systems
- Surface missile systems
- Surface missile launcher systems
- Radar systems
- Directed-energy weapons

== See also ==
- Naval Surface Warfare Center
