= USS Decatur (DD-936) =

Forrest Sherman-class destroyer (active 1956–1988)

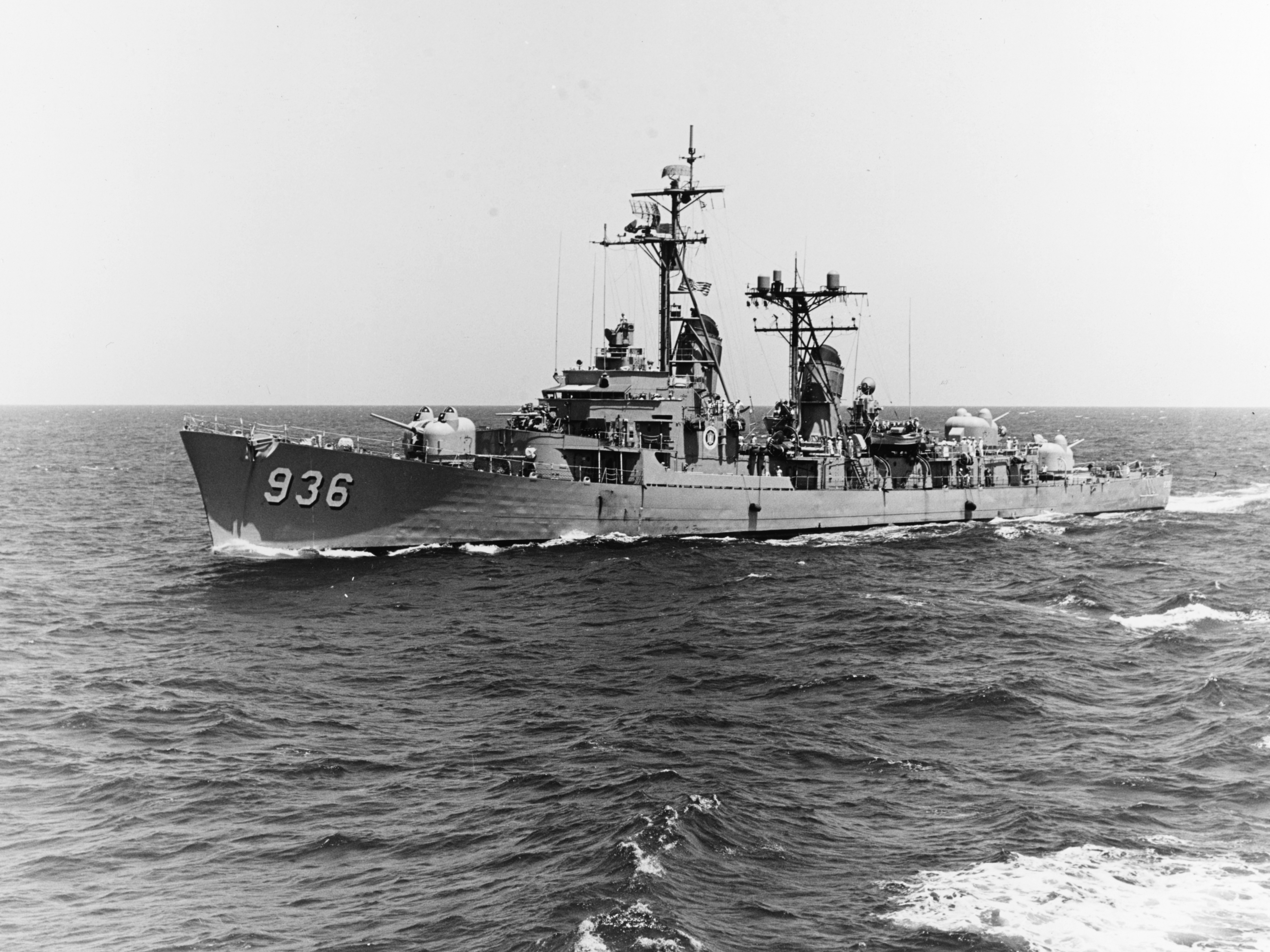
- Decatur underway on 13 April 1963.

History

United States
- Namesake: Stephen Decatur
- Builder: Bethlehem Steel Corporation, Fore River Shipyard, Quincy, Massachusetts
- Laid down: 13 September 1954
- Launched: 15 December 1955
- Acquired: 30 November 1956
- Commissioned: 7 December 1956
- Decommissioned: 30 June 1983
- Stricken: 16 March 1988
- Fate: Disposed of in support of Fleet training exercise, 22 July 2004
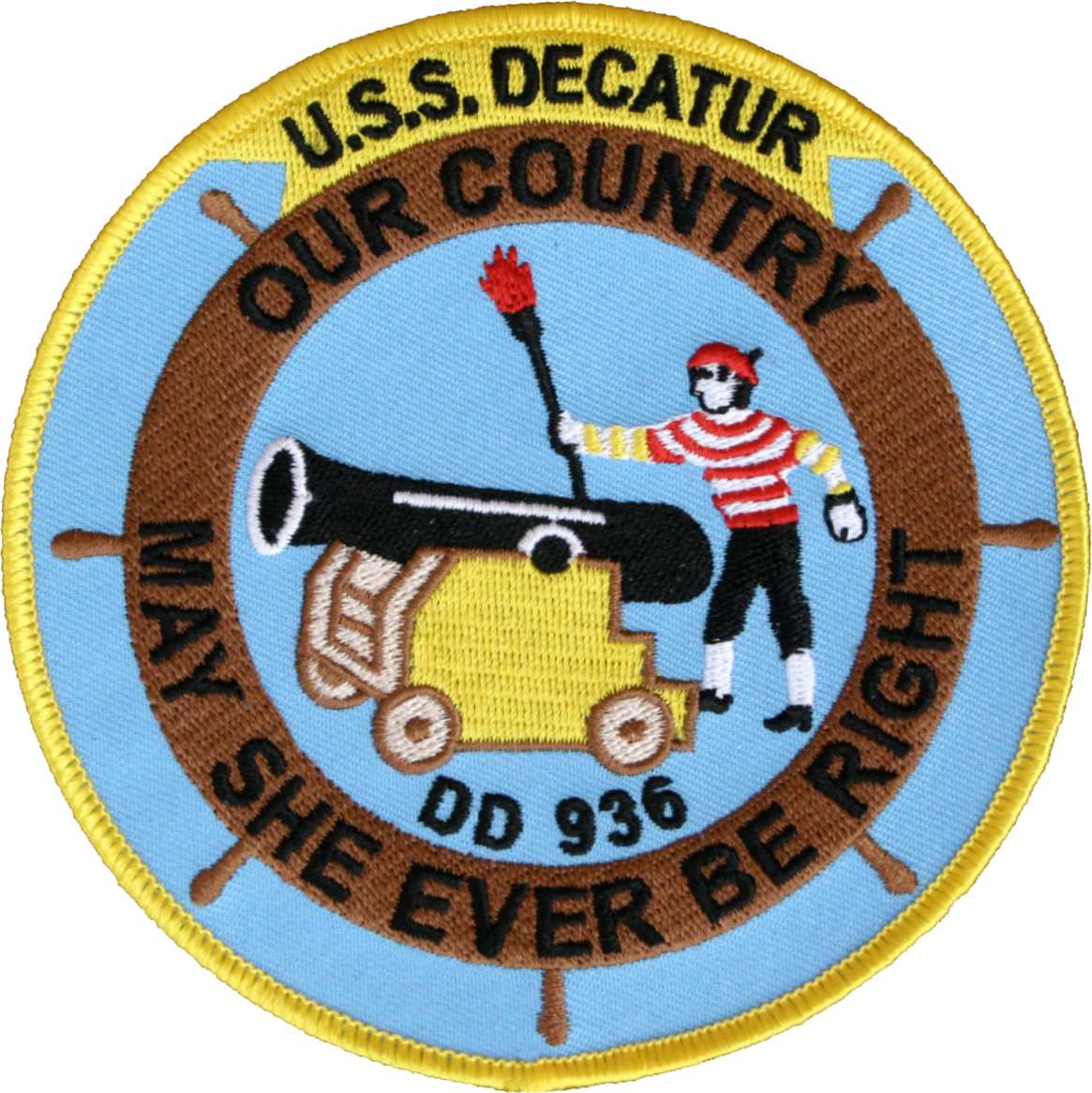
- Badge

General characteristics
- Class & type: Forrest Sherman-class destroyer
- Displacement: 4,050 tons
- Length: 418 ft 6 in (128 m)
- Beam: 45 ft (13.7 m)
- Draught: 19 ft 6 in (5.9 m)
- Propulsion: 70,000 shp (52.2 MW); Geared turbines, two propellers
- Speed: 33 knots (61 km/h; 38 mph)
- Range: 4500 nautical miles (8,300 km)
- Complement: 337
- Electronic warfare & decoys: 5
- Armament: (in 1956); 3 × 5 in (127 mm)/54, 2 × 3 in (76 mm)/50 twin mounts, 2 × ASW hedgehogs (Mk 11), 4 × 21 inch (533 mm) Mk 25 torpedo tubes; (in 1967); 2 × 5 in (127 mm)/54, 1 × ASROC launcher; 2 × triple 13 in Mk 32 torpedo tubes

See USS Decatur for other ships of the same name.

The fourth USS Decatur (DD-936) was a Forrest Sherman-class destroyer of the United States Navy in service from 1956 to 1983. She was named for Commodore Stephen Decatur USN (1779–1820). Decatur was modernised as a guided missile destroyer in the mid-1960s and re-designated DDG-31. After her decommissioning in 1983, she operated as the U.S. Navy's Self Defense Test Ship from 1994 to 2003. She was finally sunk as a target the following year.

== History ==
=== 1956-1966 ===
Decatur was laid down by the Bethlehem Steel Corporation at Quincy, Massachusetts, on 13 September 1954, launched on 15 December 1955 by Mrs. W. A. Pierce and Mrs. D. J. Armsden, descendants of Commodore Decatur and commissioned on 7 December 1956.

In 1957, she made her shakedown cruise through the Caribbean area, ran special trials, and steamed to northern Europe. Early in 1958 the new destroyer again crossed the Atlantic to begin her first Sixth Fleet tour in the Mediterranean Sea. Decatur made more such deployments during the late 1950s and early 1960s, as well as serving as a spacecraft recovery ship in September 1961 and taking part in Cuban Quarantine operations in November and December 1962. On 6 May 1964, her superstructure was heavily damaged in a collision with the aircraft carrier Lake Champlain (CVS-39). The unrepaired Decatur was placed "in commission, in reserve" later in the year to await modernization, and was formally decommissioned on 15 June 1965.

=== 1966-1983 ===
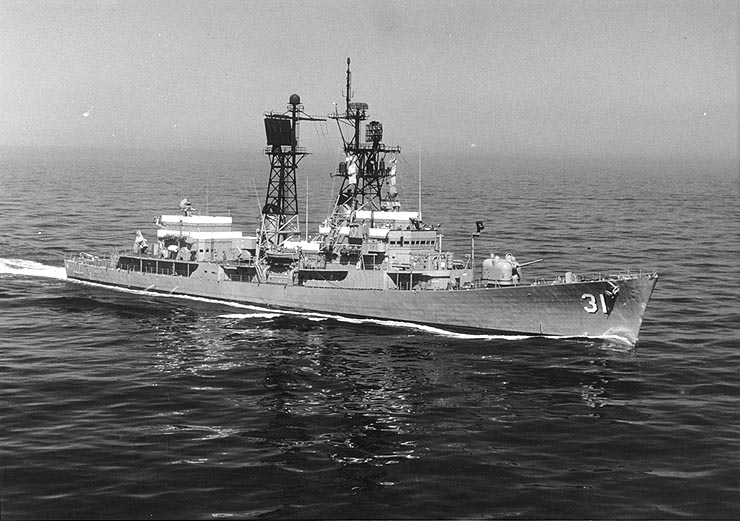
Decatur (DDG-31) underway off San Diego, California, 24 June 1976.

During the next two years Decatur was extensively modified at the Boston Naval Shipyard, Massachusetts. She was reclassified as a guided-missile destroyer in September 1966, receiving the new hull number DDG-31, and was recommissioned in April 1967 with CDR Lee Baggett Jr. in command. In September that year she transferred to the Pacific Fleet, her assignment for the remainder of her commissioned service. Decatur's first Seventh Fleet deployment, in the Western Pacific, took place between July 1968 and February 1969. In this, and her next two Far Eastern tours in 1970 and 1971–72, she engaged in Vietnam War operations and visited southern Pacific nations. Further "WestPac" cruises took place in 1973, 1974–75, 1976–77 and 1978–1979. The last deployment also took her into the Indian Ocean, an area of increasing interest to the U.S. Navy as the Persian Gulf region became unstable.

In 1981 and again in 1982, Decatur steamed across the Pacific for more duty with the Seventh Fleet and, in 1983, in the Persian Gulf. At the end of June 1983, several weeks after returning from her last deployment, she was decommissioned and placed in the Pacific Reserve Fleet. USS Decatur was stricken from the Naval Vessel Register in March 1988. Her name was canceled sometime thereafter.

=== 1994-2003 ===
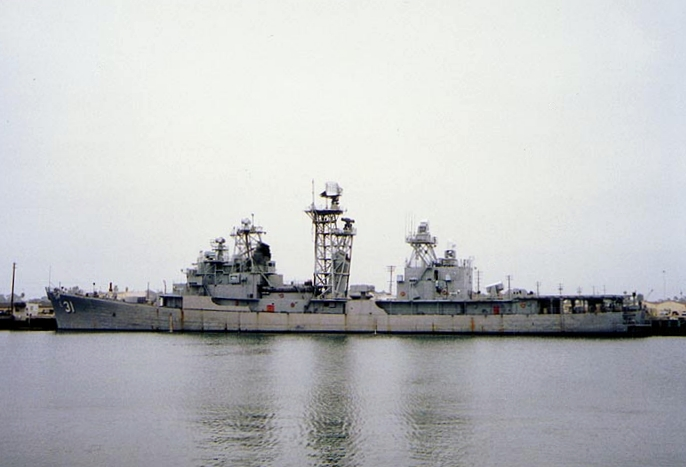
Decatur as the U.S. Navy's Self Defense Test Ship, 2003.

However, the ship had a long career ahead of her as Self Defense Test Ship (SDTS), a role for which she was converted in the late 1980s and early 1990s. The ship had "^{E}31" painted on the hull during this time. From 1994 to 2003 she was employed along the Pacific Coast, conducting trials of various systems for countering anti-shipping cruise missiles and other threats. After being replaced as SDTS by the decommissioned USS Paul F. Foster (DD-964) she was disposed of in support of Fleet training exercise 22 July 2004. Decatur appears briefly in background footage in the television crime-drama NCIS (Season 1, Episode 7 "Sub Rosa" (2003) as well as briefly in the background of JAG (Season 5 Episode 4 "The Return")
