= AN/SPQ-9 =

Naval multipurpose surface search and fire-control radar

AN/SPQ-9A
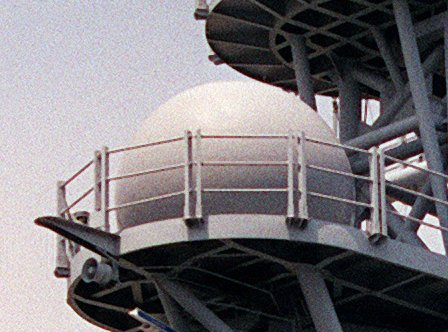
- The AN/SPQ-9 radome on USS Nicholson
- Country of origin: United States
- Frequency: X band (8-12 GHz)
- Range: 150 yds (137 m) to 20 nm (37 km)
- Power: 1.2 kW

AN/SPQ-9A (sometimes pronounced as "spook nine") is a United States Navy multi-purpose surface search and fire control radar used with the Mk-86 gun fire-control system (MK86 GFCS). It is a two dimensional surface-search radar, meaning it provides only range and bearing but not elevation. It is intended primarily to detect and track targets at sea level, on the surface of the water for either gun fire engagement or navigation. It can however, also detect and track low altitude (below 2000 ft) air targets.

In accordance with the Joint Electronics Type Designation System (JETDS), the "AN/SPQ-9" designation represents the 9th design of an Army-Navy electronic device for surface ship special radar system. The JETDS system also now is used to name all Department of Defense electronic systems.

== Service ==
Initially tested on the USS Norton Sound, it was also deployed on Spruance-class destroyers, Kidd-class destroyers, Arleigh Burke-class destroyers, Ticonderoga-class cruisers, Tarawa-class amphibious assault ships, California-class cruisers, Virginia-class cruisers, and National Security Cutters of the United States Coast Guard. It was fitted to the German Navy's Lütjens-class destroyers as part of the Type 103B upgrade in the 1980s.

== SPQ-9B ==
The SPQ-9A on Ticonderoga-class cruisers and the SPS-67 on Arleigh Burke-class destroyers are being replaced by the SPQ-9B. It provides twice the range compared to the SPQ-9A and improved range resolution. This replacement is being done as a part of the United States Navy's cruiser modernization and destroyer modernization programs to extend the life of the existing ships. The new SPQ-9B will be a part of the Mk 160 Mod 11 Gun Computer System of the Mk 34 Gun Weapon System. The first operational evaluation of the SPQ-9B was on USS Oldendorf in October 2002. It is to be installed on CVN-68, LPD-17, CG-47, WMSL-750, LHD-1, and LHA-6 ship classes. The system is X-band and the antenna consists of dual planar arrays mounted back-to-back under a radome. Flight III Arleigh Burke-class destroyers are also planned to have the SPQ-9B.

== Gallery ==
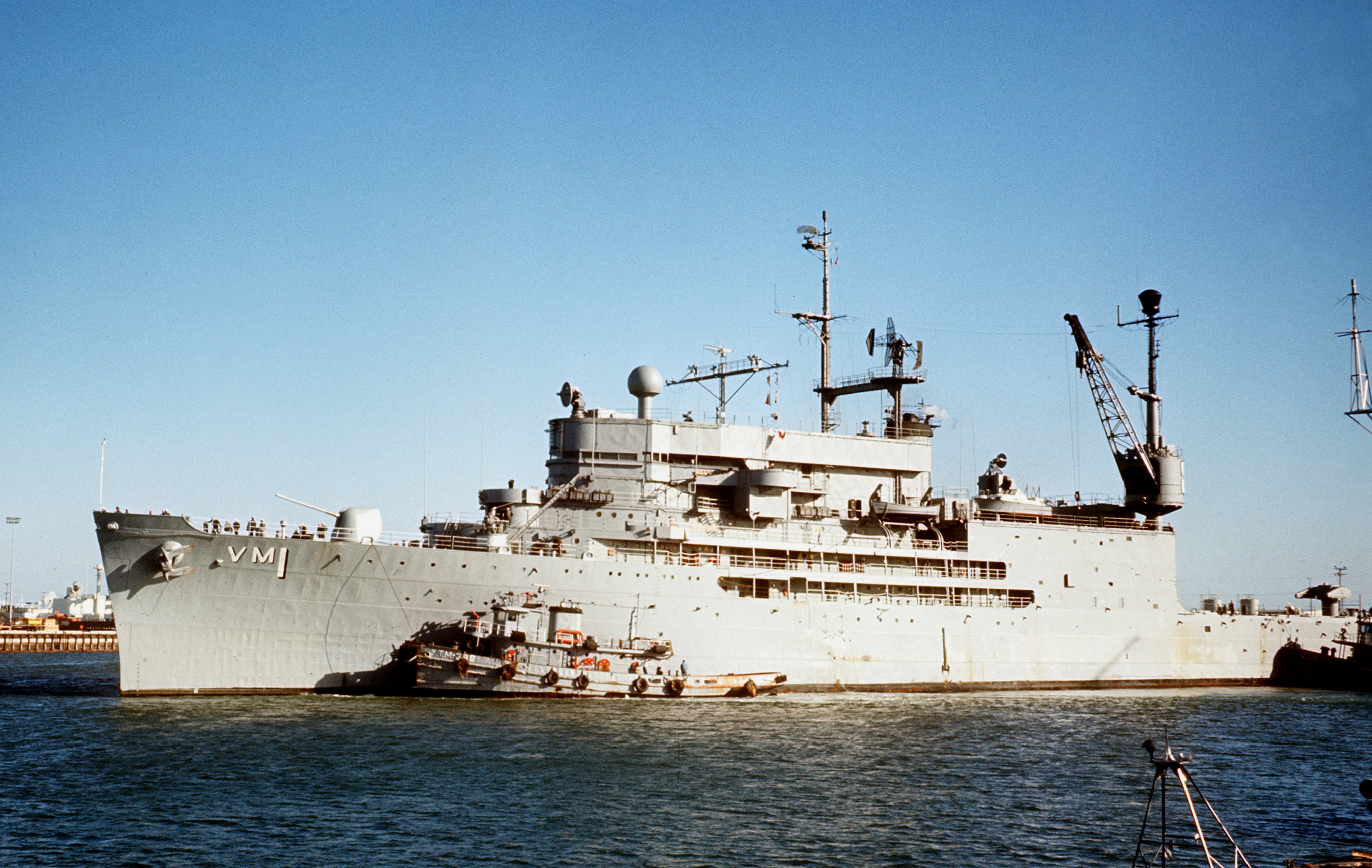
Norton Sound during Mk-86 testing, carrying AN/SPQ-9.

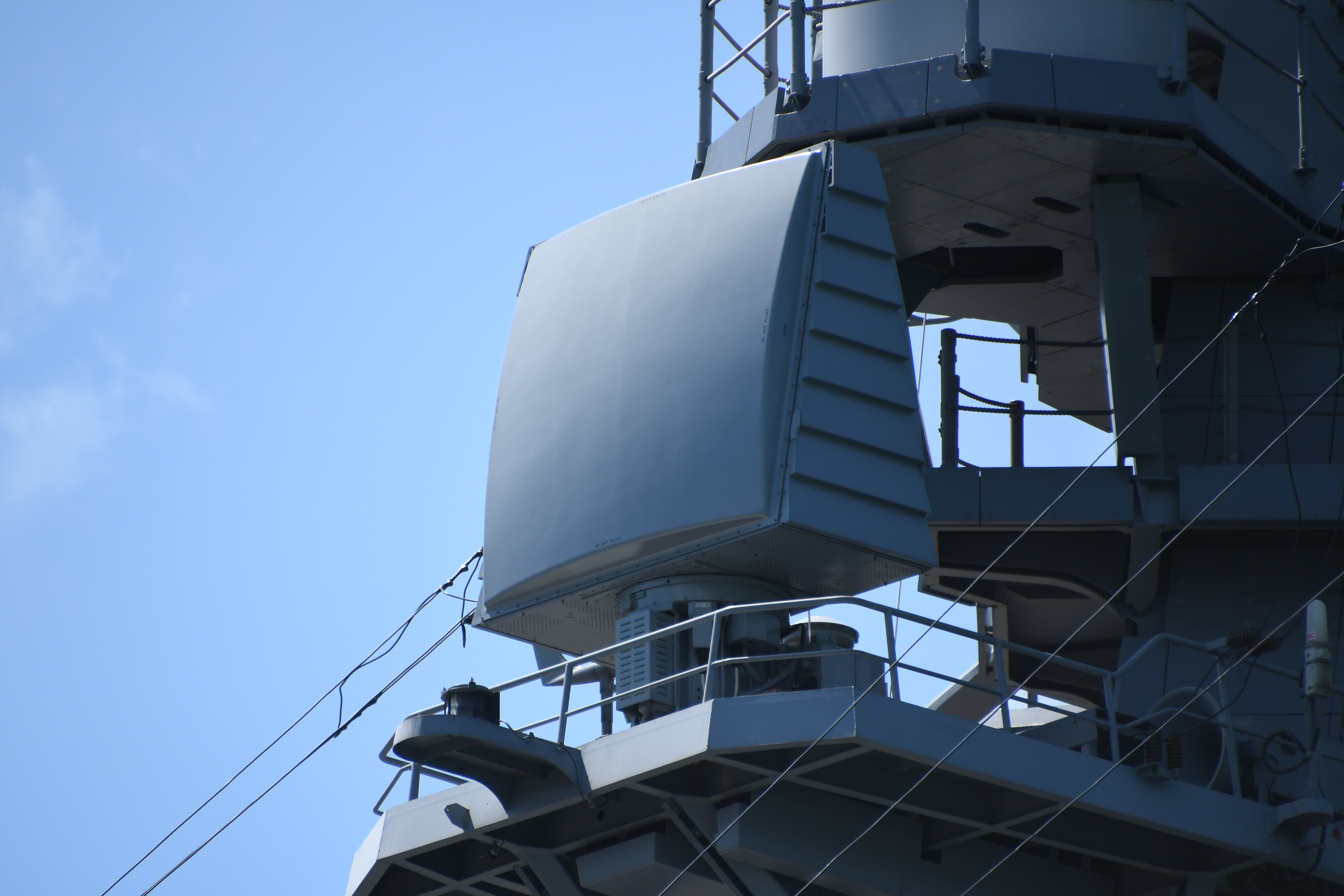
AN/SPQ-9B radar on board mast of JS Atago left front view at JMSDF Maizuru Naval Base, 13 April 2019.

== See also ==
- List of radars
- List of military electronics of the United States
