= Self Defense Test Ship =

Testing device in the US Navy

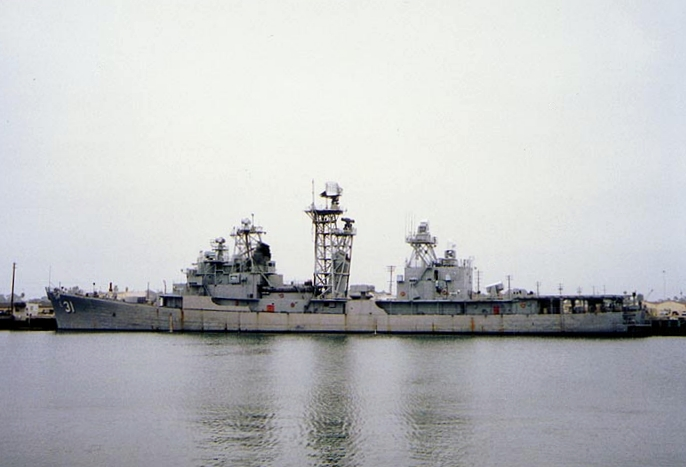
USS Decatur (DDG-31) as Self Defense Test Ship, in 2003.

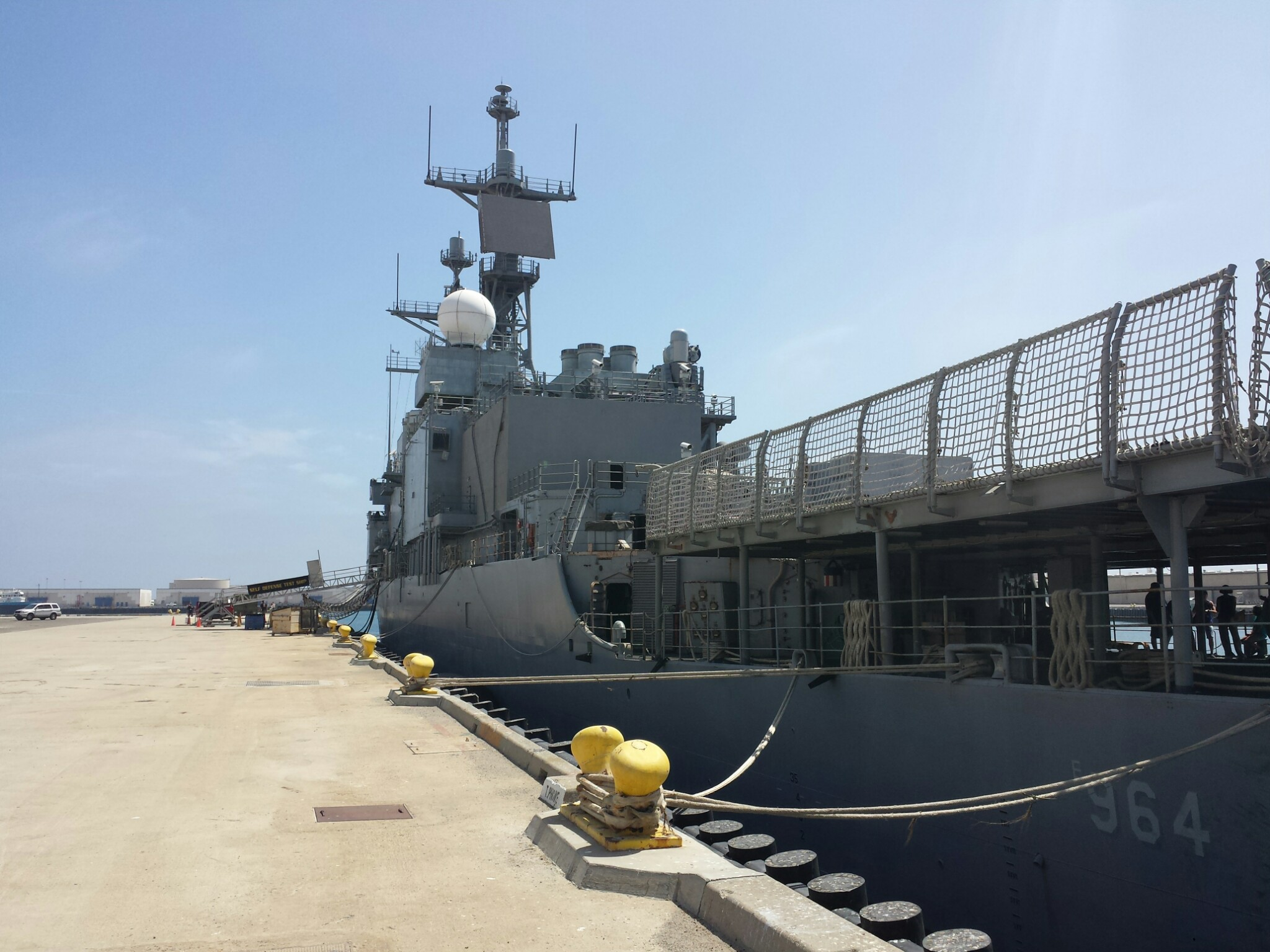
The US Navy Self Defense Test Ship (SDTS) - Formerly USS Paul F. Foster (DD-964) moored at Naval Surface Warfare Center, Naval Base Ventura County, Port Hueneme, California in 2014.

The Self Defense Test Ship (SDTS) is an asset of the United States Navy. It is a refurbished ship that is in some cases operated by remote control; that capability is designed to support self-defense engineering, testing, and evaluation.

When uncrewed, it can avoid the safety constraints and other problems associated with crewed ships. During typical operations, launched threats attack the ship, and the combat or weapon system being tested responds to these threats, defending the ship. The pre-arranged attack is, in practice, aimed at a decoy barge pulled 150 feet behind the SDTS in case of damage. Systems installed on the SDTS include MK 57 NATO Sea Sparrow, MK 23 Target Acquisition system, Rolling Airframe Missile, AN/SLQ-32(V) 3 ESM, and Phalanx Close-in Weapon System.

The current SDTS is the former USS Paul F. Foster (DD-964), now ex-Paul F. Foster. In addition to being a remote-controlled ship, she is a test-bed for numerous systems, technologies, and weapons, ranging from bio-fuels to lasers. She replaced the former USS Decatur (DDG-31) in 2003.
