= AN/SPG-60 =

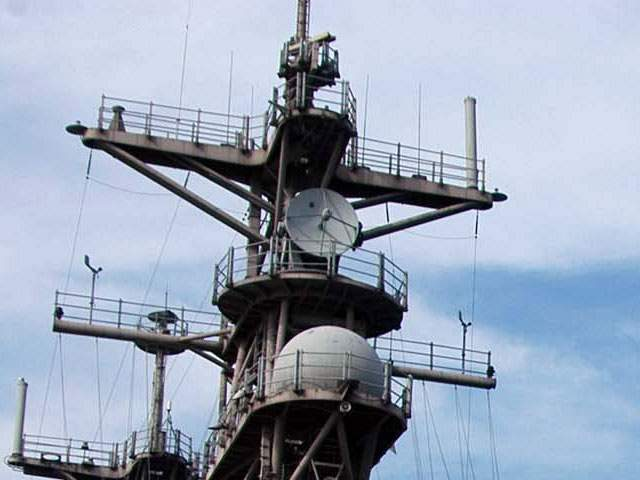
AN/SPG-60 Radar

The AN/SPG-60 (pronounced as "SPIG sixty") is a United States tracking radar that is part of the MK-86 Gun Fire Control System (GFCS). It is used for air tracking and on some MK-86 configurations it is also used for illumination for RIM-24 Tartar and RIM-66 Standard missiles. Though the radar is primarily an air tracking radar, the SPG-60 radar can be used for surface tracking. With the boresight mounted camera, the radar could also be used as a sight for optical tracking, optical engagement and damage assessment.

When an air defense capability was required of the Mk-86 GFCS, the AN/SPG-60 was developed and incorporated in the GFCS. The SPG-60 radar was originally part of the MK-86 MOD-3, MOD-4, and MOD-5 systems and was later part of the upgraded MK-86 MOD-8, MOD-10, and MOD-12 systems. It provides a three dimensional tracking solution on an air target, meaning it provides range, bearing and altitude.

The SPG-60 radar was deployed as part of the MK-86 GFCS on the Charles F. Adams, Spruance and Kidd-class destroyers, Tarawa-class amphibious assault ships, and the California and Virginia class cruisers.

Aircraft tracking is achieved using a mono-pulse Doppler signal processing. On Charles F. Adams, Virginia and Kidd-class ships, the SPG-60 radar could also be used to provide illumination operations associated with missile guidance for the installed missile fire control system.

The adjacent image shows the top side radars associated with the MK-86 GFCS on a Spruance Class Destroyer. The round dome at the bottom covers the AN/SPQ-9A surface search radar. The antenna above the dome is the AN/SPG-60 air track radar.

The AN/SPG-60 radar below deck equipment consists of a power control, antenna control, signal data converter, receiver and transmitter units. The above deck equipment is the MK-39 MOD O antenna with a boresight mounted camera.

In accordance with the Joint Electronics Type Designation System (JETDS), the "AN/SPG-60" designation represents the 60th design of an Army-Navy electronic device for waterborne fire control radar system. The JETDS system also now is used to name all Department of Defense electronic systems.

== See also ==
- List of radars
- List of military electronics of the United States
