= AN/SLQ-49 Chaff Buoy Decoy System =

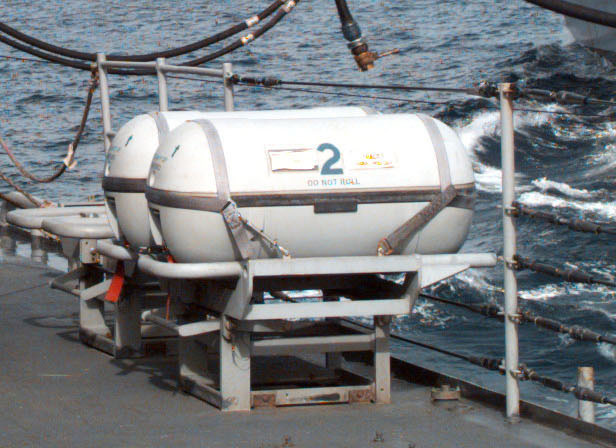
Decoys on USS Moosbrugger (DD-980)

The AN/SLQ-49 Chaff Buoy Decoy System, commonly referred to as "Rubber Duck", consists of inflatable radar-reflecting decoy buoys. It is used by the U.S. Navy, Royal Navy, and other NATO countries. The decoy is designed to seduce radar-guided anti-ship missiles by simulating the radar cross section of a ship, presenting itself as a more attractive target than the ship.

The system is deployed in pairs. The deployment process takes a few seconds. When deployed, the system launches into the water two octahedron-shaped inflatable decoy floats, connected by a 5-metre (16 ft) cable. They can last up to 3 hours in sea state 4.

The AN/SLQ-49 has been in operation since 1985. Originally designed to confuse or distract enemy radar operators, it has demonstrated effective missile seduction capabilities.

With the perceived lack of an adversary naval power following the collapse of the Soviet Union, the AN/SLQ-49 was phased out of U.S. Navy service in the 1990s. It has since been replaced with the Naval Decoy IDS300.

In accordance with the Joint Electronics Type Designation System (JETDS), the "AN/SLQ-49" designation represents the 49th design of an Army-Navy electronic device for waterborne countermeasures special equipment. The JETDS system also now is used to name all Department of Defense electronic systems.

== See also ==
- Electronic warfare
- Electronic countermeasures
- Naval Decoy IDS300
- List of military electronics of the United States
