= USS De Grasse =

Two ships of the United States Navy have been named De Grasse, in honor of Admiral Comte de Grasse of France.

- USS De Grasse (ID-1217), was a steam-powered yacht selected for service as a patrol vessel in 1917, but which never saw service with the Navy and was returned to her owner on 7 November 1918
- USS De Grasse (AK-223), was the Liberty ship Nathaniel J. Wyeth, in commission as cargo ship USS De Grasse from 1943 to 1946

== See also ==
- USS Comte de Grasse (DD-974)
- French ship De Grasse
