= French ship De Grasse =

Three ships of the French Navy have borne the name De Grasse in honour of François Joseph Paul de Grasse:

- De Grasse (1939), a requisitioned steamer
- De Grasse (C610), an anti-aircraft cruiser (1946–1974)
- De Grasse (D 612), a Tourville-class frigate (1975-2013)

== See also ==
- SS De Grasse, a French oceanliner
- USS De Grasse
