= Le Bar-sur-Loup =

Commune in Provence-Alpes-Côte d'Azur, France

Le Bar-sur-Loup So Barn (Occitan)
- Commune
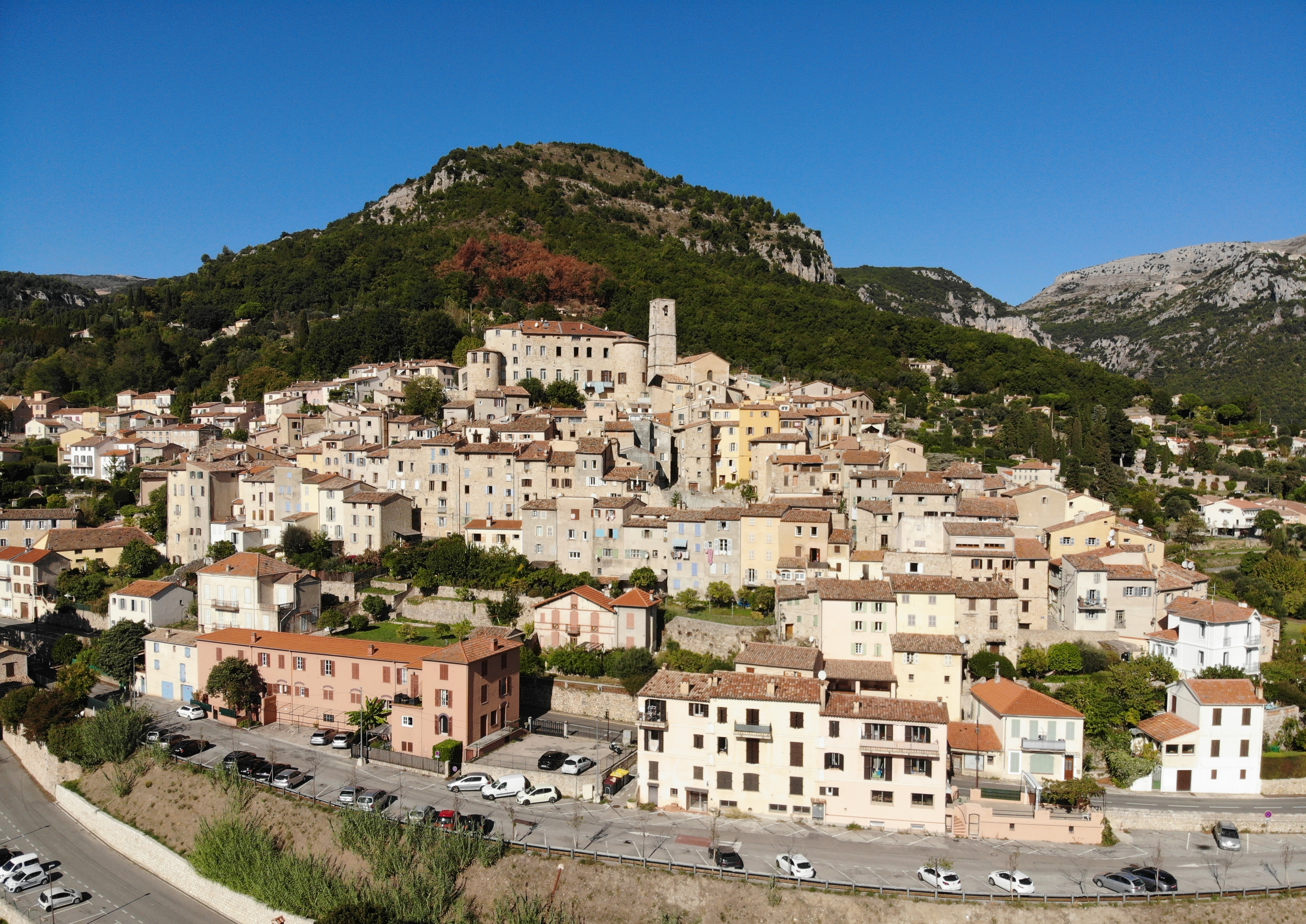
- A view of Le Bar-sur-Loup

- Coat of arms
- Location of Le Bar-sur-Loup
- Location within France Location within Provence-Alpes-Côte d'Azur
- Coordinates: 43°42′07″N 6°59′23″E
- Country: France
- Region: Provence-Alpes-Côte d'Azur
- Department: Alpes-Maritimes
- Arrondissement: Grasse
- Canton: Valbonne
- Intercommunality: CA Sophia Antipolis

Government
  - Mayor (2026–32): Delphine Carosi
- Area^{1}: 14.47 km^{2} (5.59 sq mi)
- Elevation: 310 m (1,020 ft)
- Highest elevation: 1,312 m (4,304 ft)
- Lowest elevation: 100 m (330 ft)
- Population (2023): 2,974
  - Density: 205.5/km^{2} (532.3/sq mi)
- Demonym(s): Aubarnencs, Barois
- Time zone: UTC+01:00 (CET)
  - Summer (DST): UTC+02:00 (CEST)
- INSEE/Postal code: 06010 /06620
- ^{1} French Land Register data, which excludes lakes, ponds, glaciers > 1 km^{2} (0.386 sq mi or 247 acres) and river estuaries.

Le Bar-sur-Loup (French pronunciation: [lə baʁ syʁ lu], lit. "Le Bar-on-Loup"; Occitan: So Barn; Italian: Albarno) is a commune in the Alpes-Maritimes department in the Provence-Alpes-Côte d'Azur region in Southeastern France.

Originally known simply as Le Bar, the commune was renamed Le Bar-sur-Loup by a decree dated 27 March 1961 published in the Journal officiel on 1 April, with effect from 2 April 1961.

== Geography ==
The commune gets its name from the Loup, a coastal river that runs through it. The Loup flows into the Mediterranean near Villeneuve-Loubet.

== History ==
The first record of the commune was recorded in 1078, in the book Albarnum or Poncii Albarni. In 1235, the village was renamed to Catrum de Albarno, and throughout the 16th century, it was renamed to Lou Barn, Le Barn, and finally Le Bar-sur-Loup.

== Places and monuments ==
Church of Saint-Jacques-le-Majeur

The carvings on the door are quite notable. On the inside is an altarpiece painted by Ludovico Brea, dating to the 16th century, as well as statues from the 17th century. In the back of the church, there is a wood carving of a danse macabre from the 15th century.

Le château des comtes de Grasse

A quadrangular building built on vaulted cellars, with two towers to the south and a smaller one to the north. The castle was sacked in 1792 and sold to the villagers in 1832. Restored, it was divided into apartments. It was the birthplace of François Joseph Paul de Grasse on 13 September 1722. He became the Comte de Grasse and served as a career French naval general.

At the entrance to the courtyard before the castle is a broad-based square tower. This is the old castle keep, now used as a tourist office. Before it was dismantled in 1792, it had seven storeys. A museum has been set up on the first floor which tells the stories of the village's most famous residents. The Chateau de Grasse is now operated as a hotel.

== Gallery ==
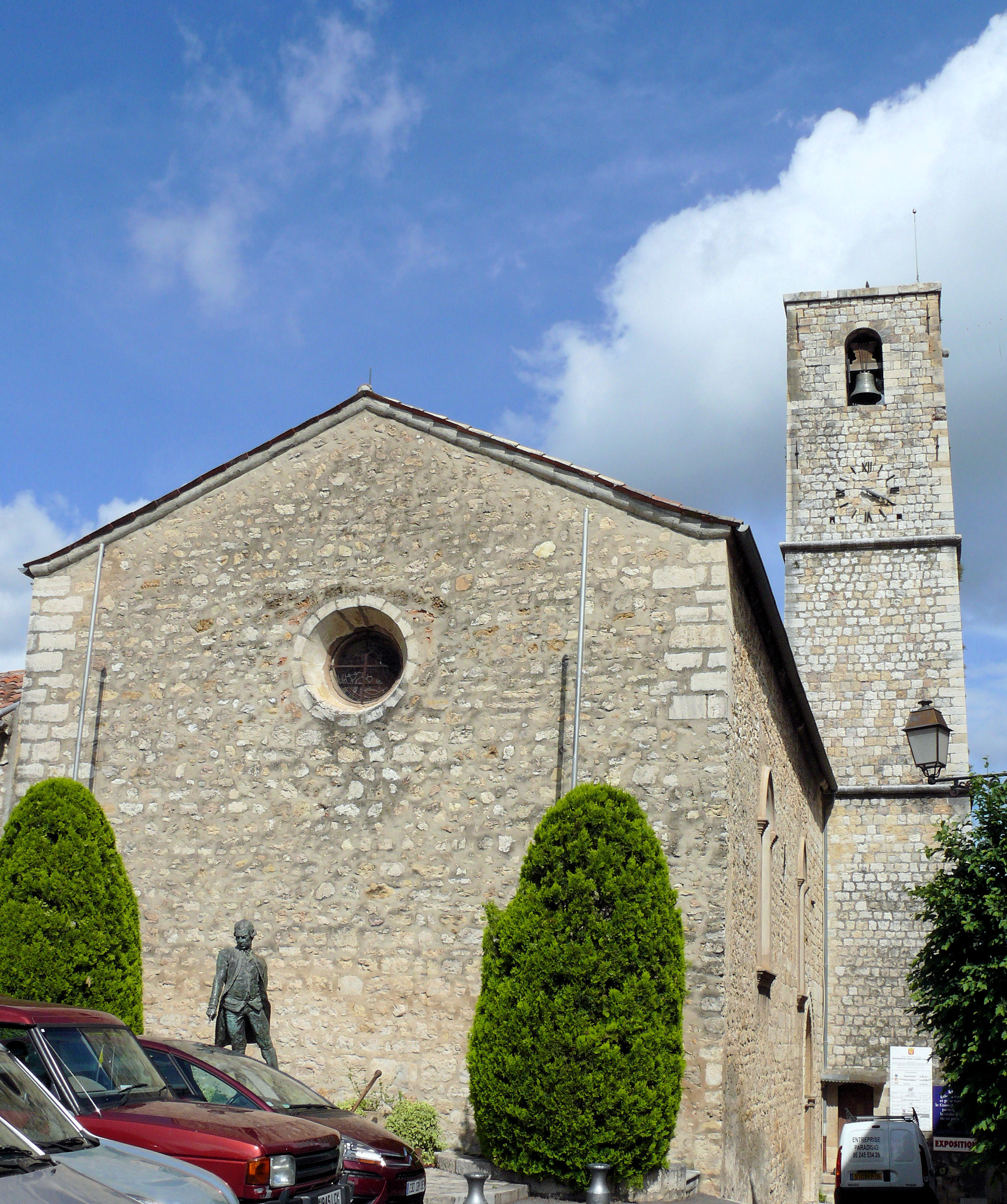
Église Saint-Jacques-le-Majeur

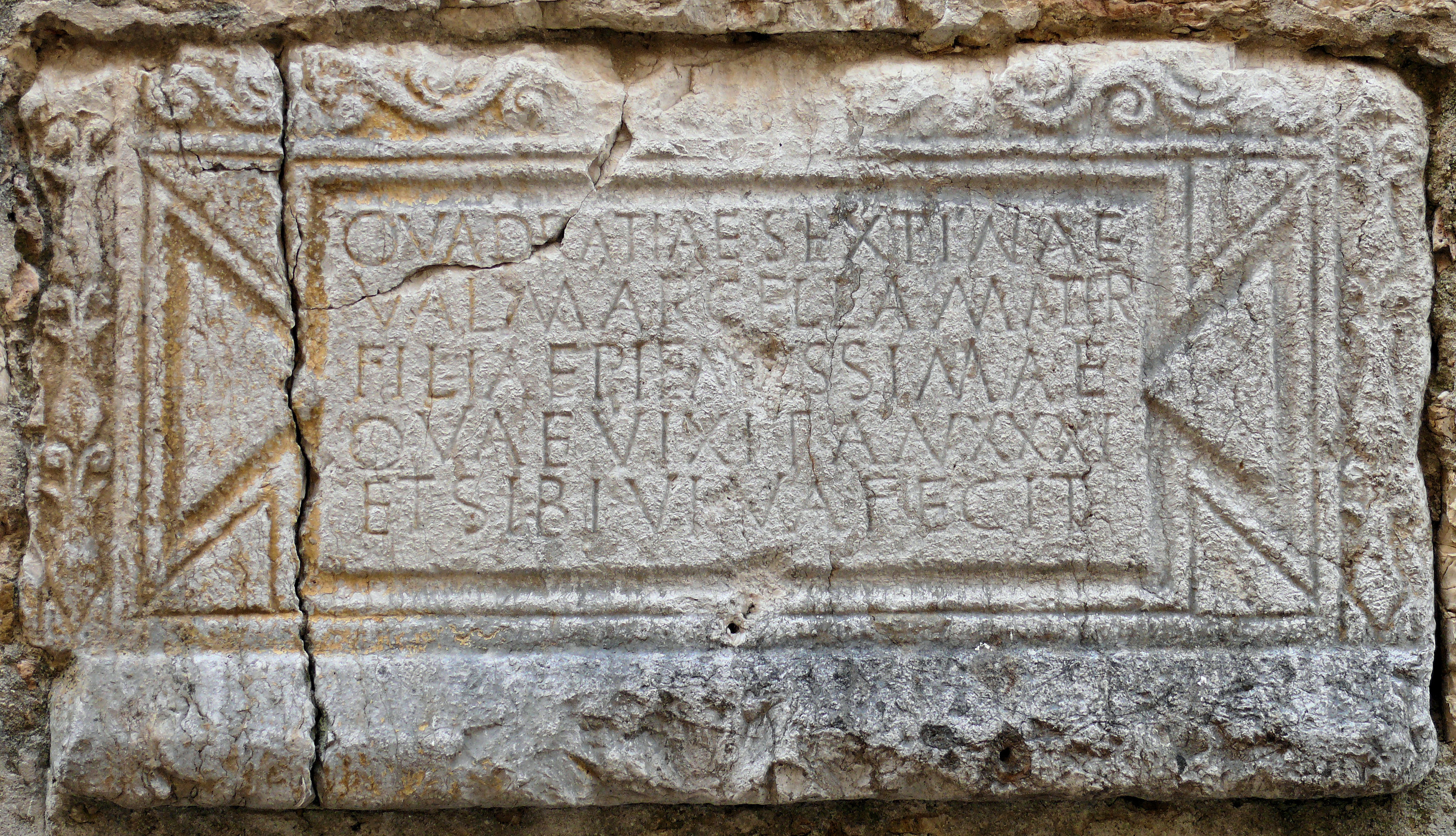
Roman funerary plaque in the wall of the church

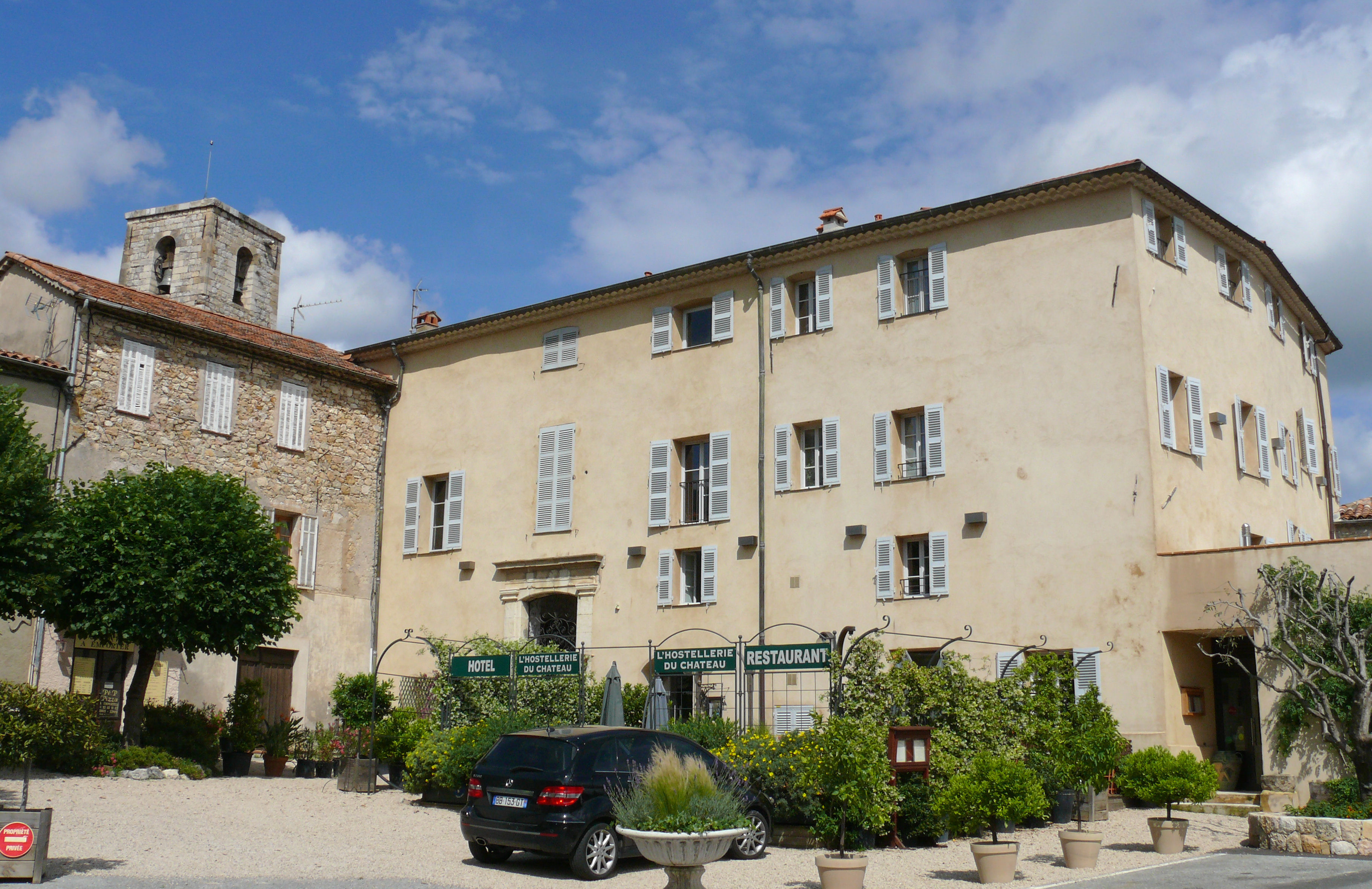
Le château des comtes de Grasse

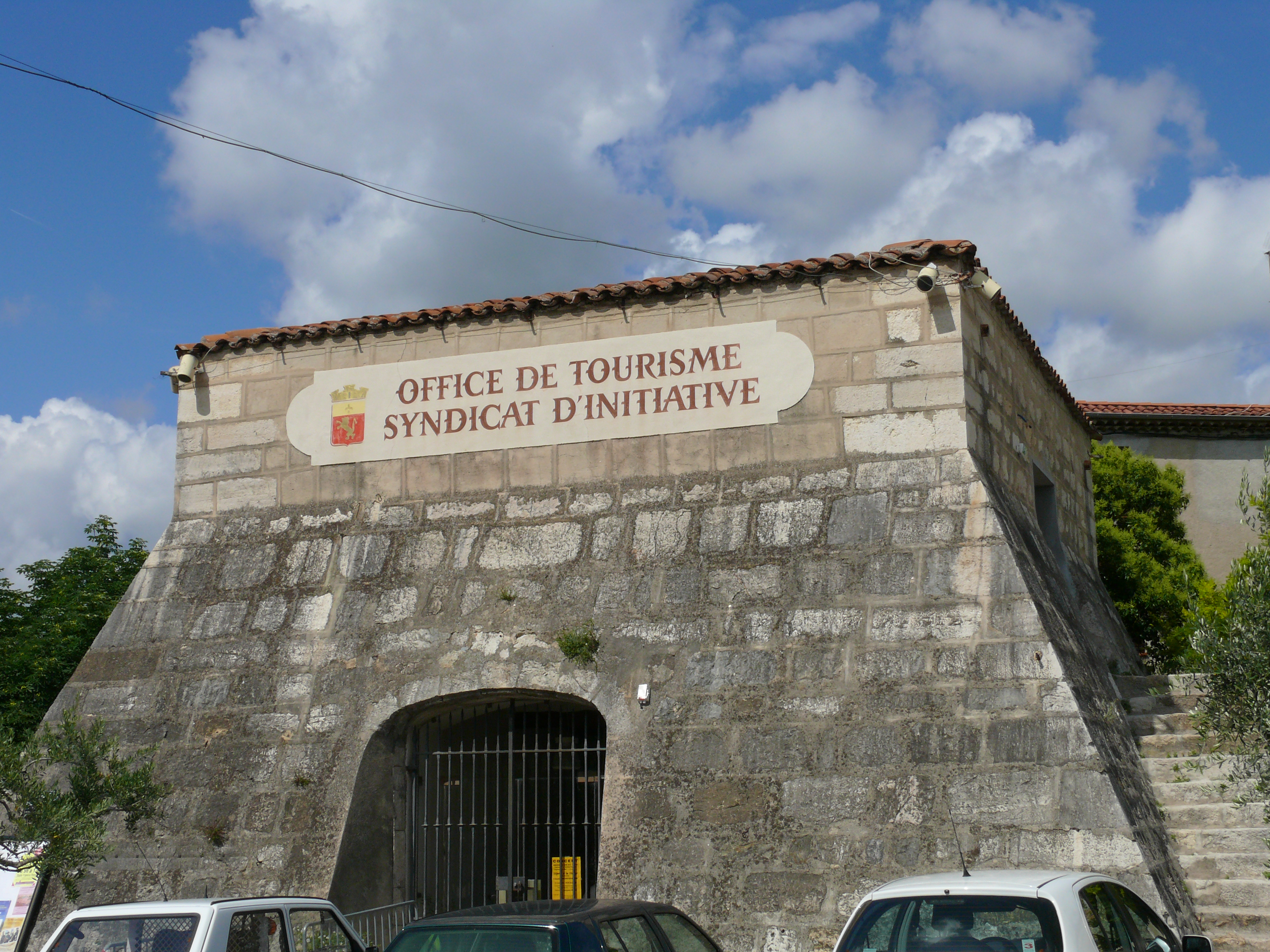
The base of the old tower keep

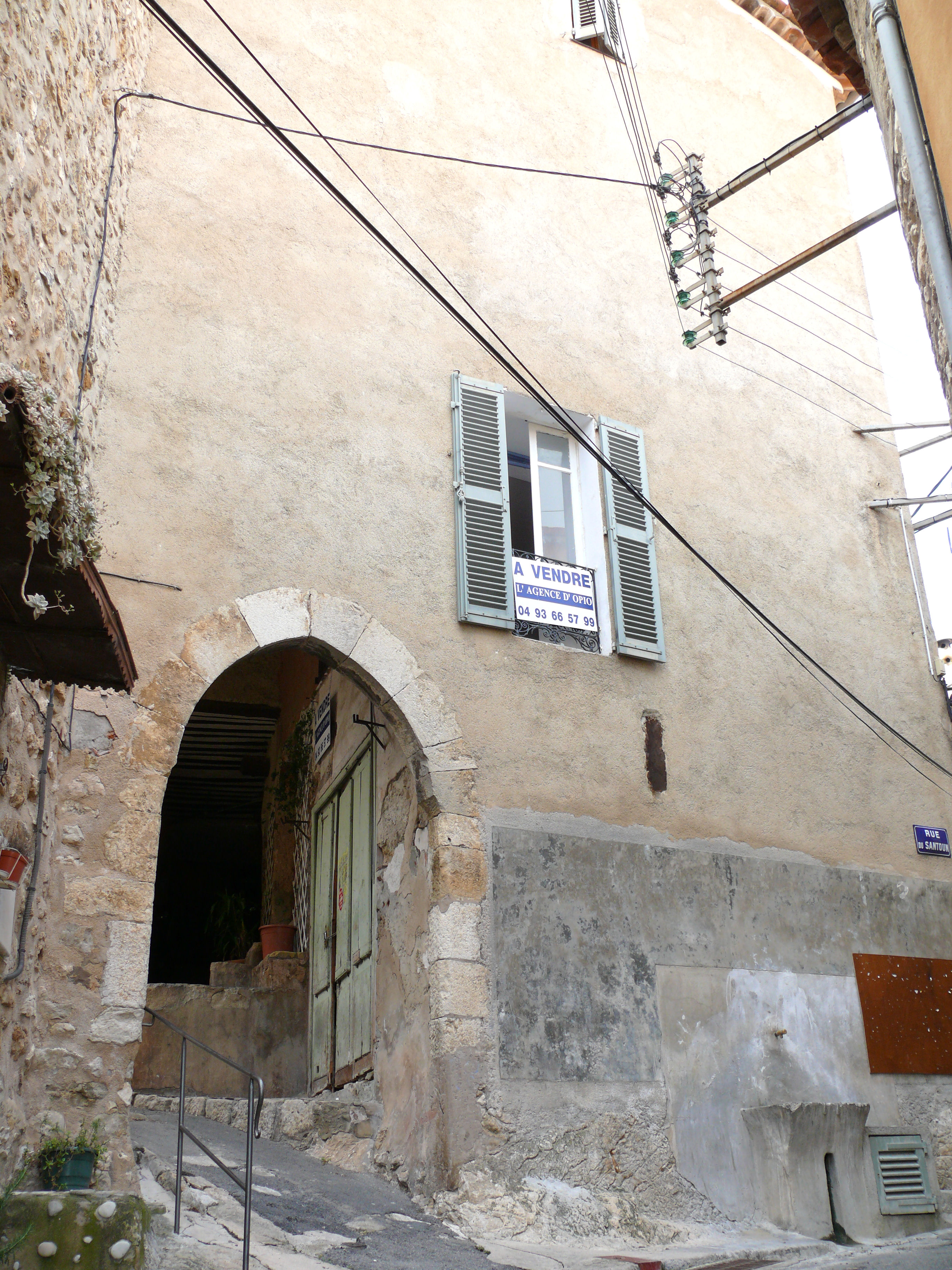
La porte Sarrasine (The Saracen door)

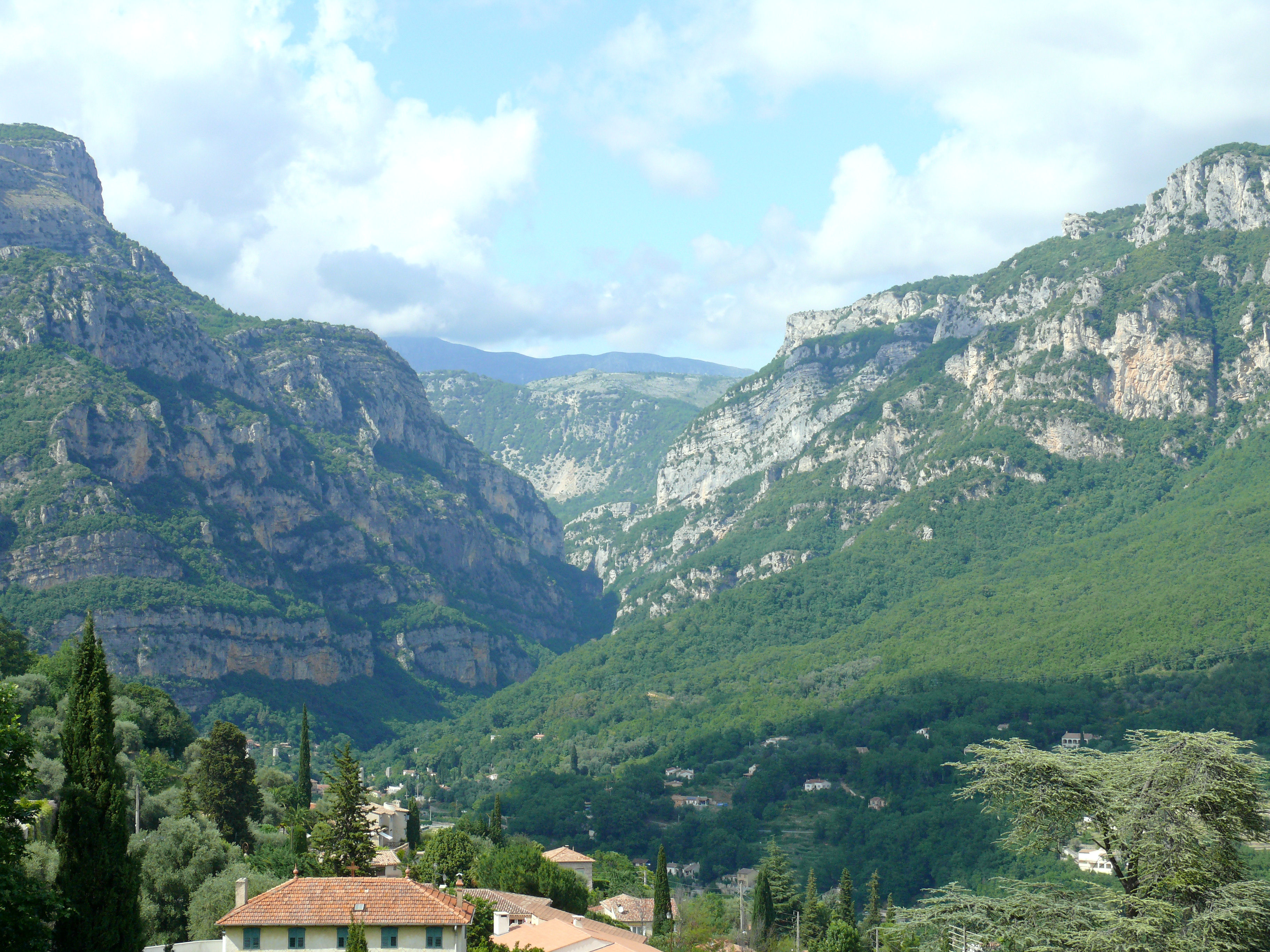
The Loup gorge as seen from the church square

== Demographics ==
Historical population
Year	Pop.	±% p.a.
1968	1,647	—
1975	1,691	+0.38%
1982	2,043	+2.74%
1990	2,465	+2.37%
1999	2,543	+0.35%
2007	2,752	+0.99%
2012	2,926	+1.23%
2017	2,936	+0.07%
2023	2,974	+0.21%
Source: INSEE

Its inhabitants are known as Aubarnais in French – Aubarnenc in Occitan – or simply Barois.

== Legend ==
During Lent, a count in Le Bar held a party during which all the guests died. A danse macabre was painted to commemorate this divine punishment. It shows Death as an archer, firing arrows at the guests. Ghosts rise from the mouths of the corpses in the form of small, naked people, who are weighed in a balance held by Saint Michael (sitting at the feet of Christ). The ghosts are sent into the jaws of a monster, representing the entrance to hell.

== Notable persons ==
- François Joseph Paul de Grasse (1722-1788), Comte de Grasse and career naval officer who attained the rank of admiral. He served in the American Revolutionary War on the side of the rebels.

== Sister city ==
Le Bar-sur-Loup has a sister city:

- Poquoson, Virginia, United States of America.

== See also ==
- Communes of the Alpes-Maritimes department
