= USS Stump =

Spruance-class destroyer

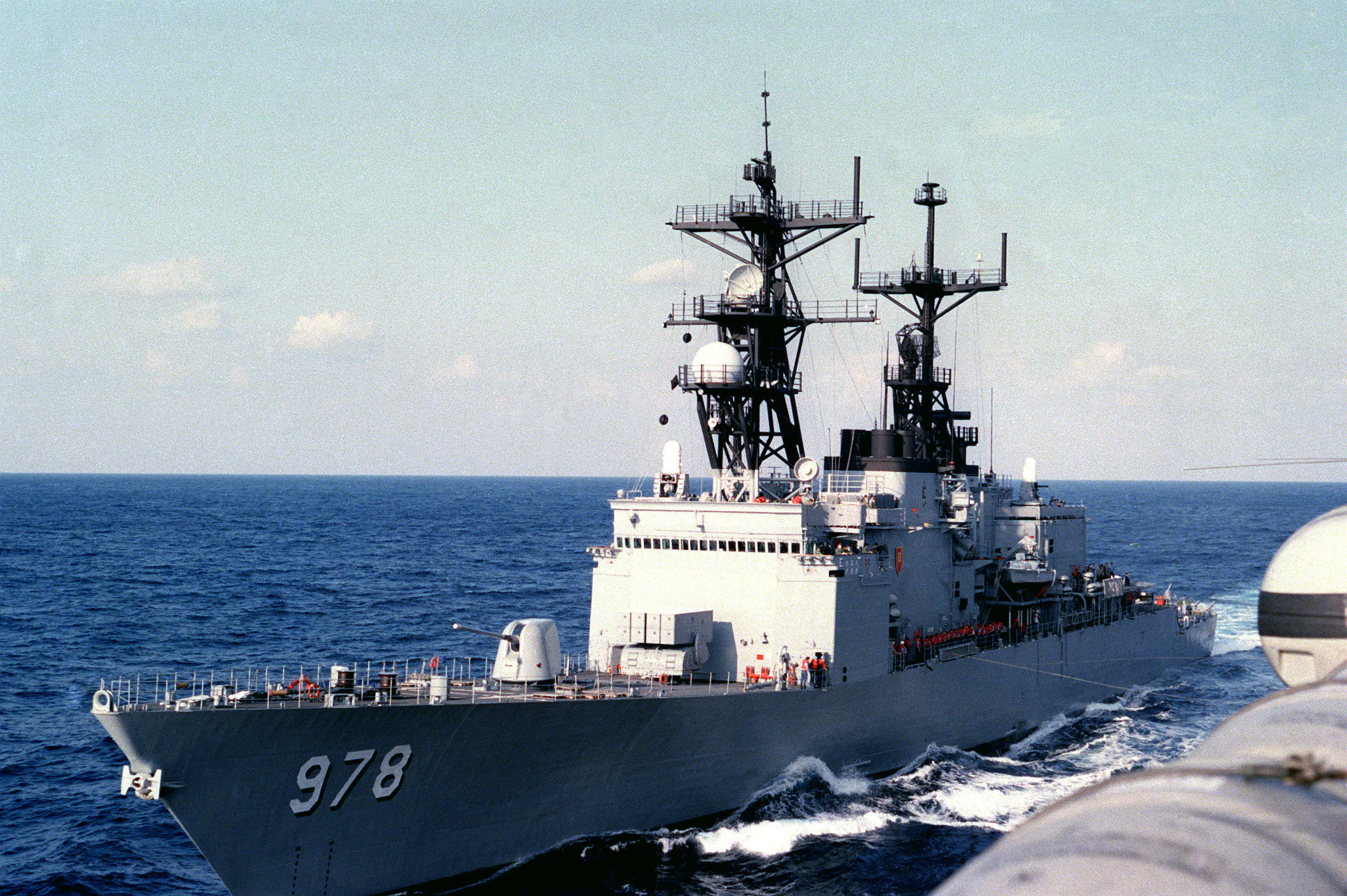
- USS Stump on 1 February 1988

History

United States
- Name: Stump
- Namesake: Felix Budwell Stump
- Ordered: 26 January 1972
- Builder: Ingalls Shipbuilding
- Laid down: 25 August 1975
- Launched: 1 January 1977
- Acquired: 24 July 1978
- Commissioned: 19 August 1978
- Decommissioned: 22 October 2004
- Stricken: 22 October 2004
- Identification: Callsign: NFBS; Hull number: DD-978
- Motto: Tenacity: Foundation of Victory
- Fate: Sunk as target, 7 June 2006
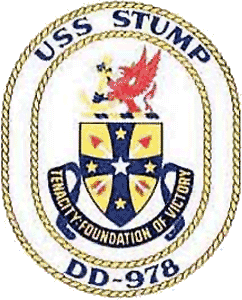
- Badge

General characteristics
- Class & type: Spruance-class destroyer
- Displacement: 8,040 long tons (8,170 t) full load
- Length: 529 ft (161 m) waterline; 563 ft (172 m) overall
- Beam: 55 ft (17 m)
- Draft: 29 ft (8.8 m)
- Installed power: 3 × 501-K17 generator sets (2,000 kW (2,700 hp) each)
- Propulsion: 4 × General Electric LM2500 gas turbines, 2 shafts, 80,000 shp (60 MW)
- Speed: 32.5 knots (60.2 km/h; 37.4 mph)
- Range: 6,000 nmi (11,000 km; 6,900 mi) at 20 knots (37 km/h; 23 mph)
- Complement: 19 officers, 315 enlisted
- Sensors & processing systems: AN/SPS-40 air search radar; AN/SPG-60 fire control radar; AN/SPS-55 surface search radar; AN/SPQ-9 gun fire control radar; Mark 23 TAS automatic detection and tracking radar; AN/SPS-65 missile fire control radar; AN/SQS-53 bow-mounted active sonar; AN/SQR-19 TACTAS towed array passive sonar; Naval Tactical Data System
- Electronic warfare & decoys: AN/SLQ-32 electronic warfare system; AN/SLQ-25 Nixie torpedo countermeasures; Mark 36 SRBOC decoy launching system; AN/SLQ-49 inflatable decoys
- Armament: 2 × 5 in (127 mm) 54 caliber Mark 45 dual purpose guns; 2 × 20 mm Phalanx CIWS Mark 15 guns; 1 × 8 cell ASROC launcher (removed); 1 × 8 cell NATO Sea Sparrow Mark 29 missile launcher; 2 × quadruple Harpoon missile canisters; 2 × Mark 32 triple 12.75 in (324 mm) torpedo tubes (Mk 46 torpedoes); 1 × 61 cell Mk 41 VLS launcher for Tomahawk missiles; 1 × 21 cell RIM-116 Rolling Airframe Missile launcher
- Aircraft carried: 2 × Sikorsky SH-60 Seahawk LAMPS III helicopters
- Aviation facilities: Flight deck and enclosed hangar for up to two medium-lift helicopters

USS Stump (DD-978) was a Spruance-class destroyer built by the Ingalls Shipbuilding Division of Litton Industries at Pascagoula, Mississippi. The USS Stump was decommissioned and stricken on 22 October 2004.

== History ==
Stump was laid down 25 August 1975, launched 29 January 1977, and commissioned on 19 August 1978. The ship was named after Admiral Felix Stump, Commander of the U.S. Pacific Command from 1953 to 1958.

Stump's 1980 maiden deployment was to the Mediterranean, serving as flagship for Destroyer Squadron 14. Stump conducted Black Sea operations, port visits and extensive undersea warfare (USW) operations. As a result of her outstanding performance, Stump was awarded the "Hookem Award" for USW excellence by the commander of the U.S. 6th Fleet.

A year later, Stump deployed as south Atlantic flagship for UNITAS XXII. It was on this cruise that Stump obtained its mascot Felix, a bluefronted Amazon parrot, during a port visit to Brazil. Stump was the first Spruance class ship to traverse the inland waterway of Chile.

In October 1982, Stump deployed to the Persian Gulf as a part of the Middle East Force to conduct radar picket operations. Returning home in March 1983, she participated in Solid Shield '83, a complex exercise involving U.S. NATO ships and the U.S. Air Force. The ship went through a ten-month major overhaul at the Brooklyn Navy Yard. She was the first Spruance class ship to go outside Mississippi for a major overhaul.

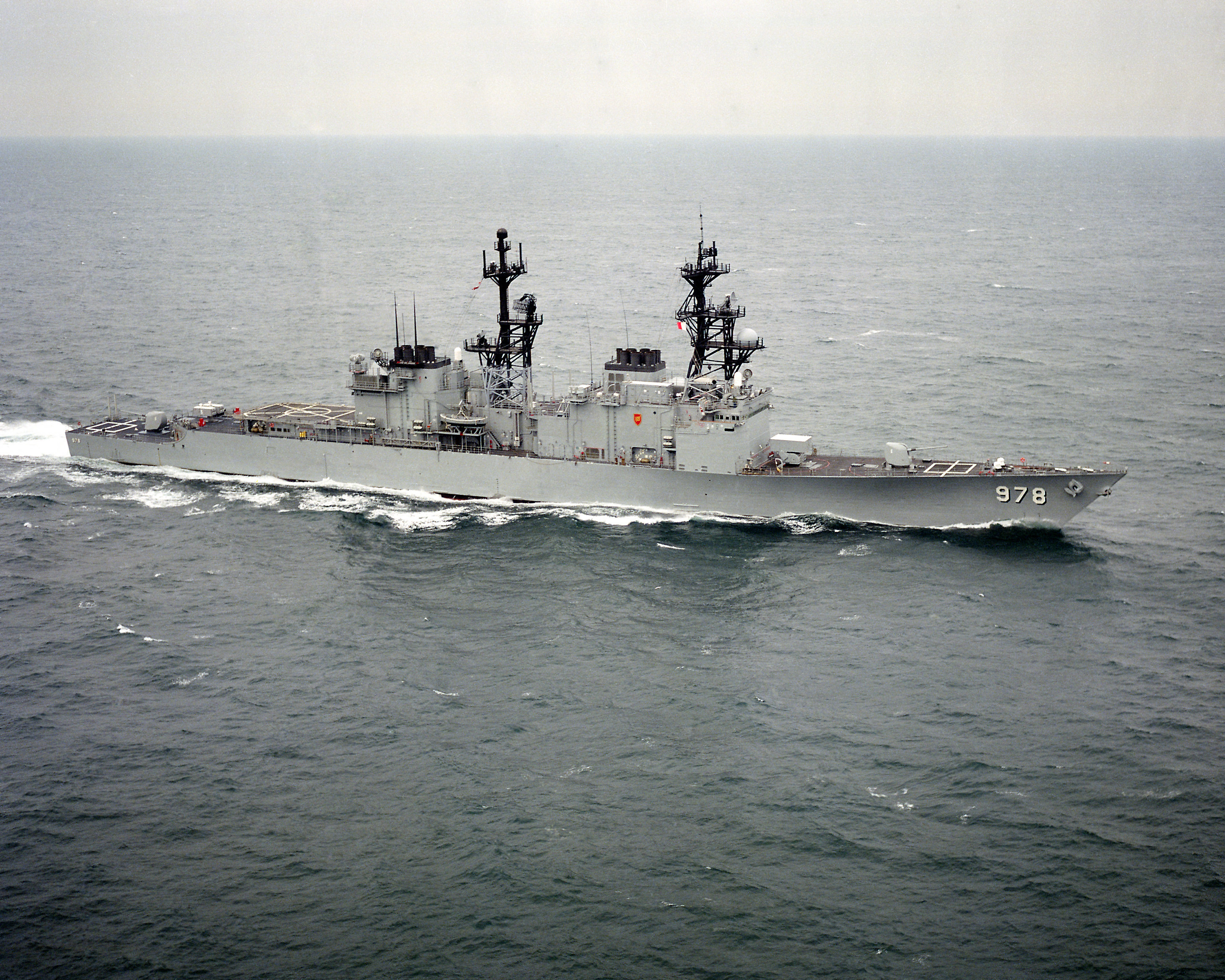
USS Stump in 1985

March 1984 was highlighted by Stump's adoption as state flagship of West Virginia. Stump then traveled to New Orleans as the U.S. Navy's host ship for the 1984 World's Fair. Also in 1984, Stump won the James F. Chezek Memorial Gunnery Award by shooting a 496 out of 500 during naval gunfire support qualifications.

Admiral W. L. McDonald, Commander in Chief U.S. Atlantic Fleet, embarked in March 1985 for CARIBOPS '85. While in the Caribbean, Stump again shot naval gunfire support qualifications and scored 495 out of 500, winning the Atlantic Fleet "Top Gun" award for an unprecedented second year in a row. Stump then deployed for UNITAS XXVI/WATC '85. During the deployment, Stump showed the flag in port visits to eight South American nations and six West African nations. 1986 was significant for two reasons. First, Stump was chosen to become the test platform for the U.S. Navy's newest hull-mounted sonar, the AN/SQS-53C. Using advanced technology, the "53C" would be the sonar for the U.S. Navy combatants well into the twenty-first century. Secondly, Stump was awarded the COMDESRON TEN Battle "E" Efficiency award for overall excellence.

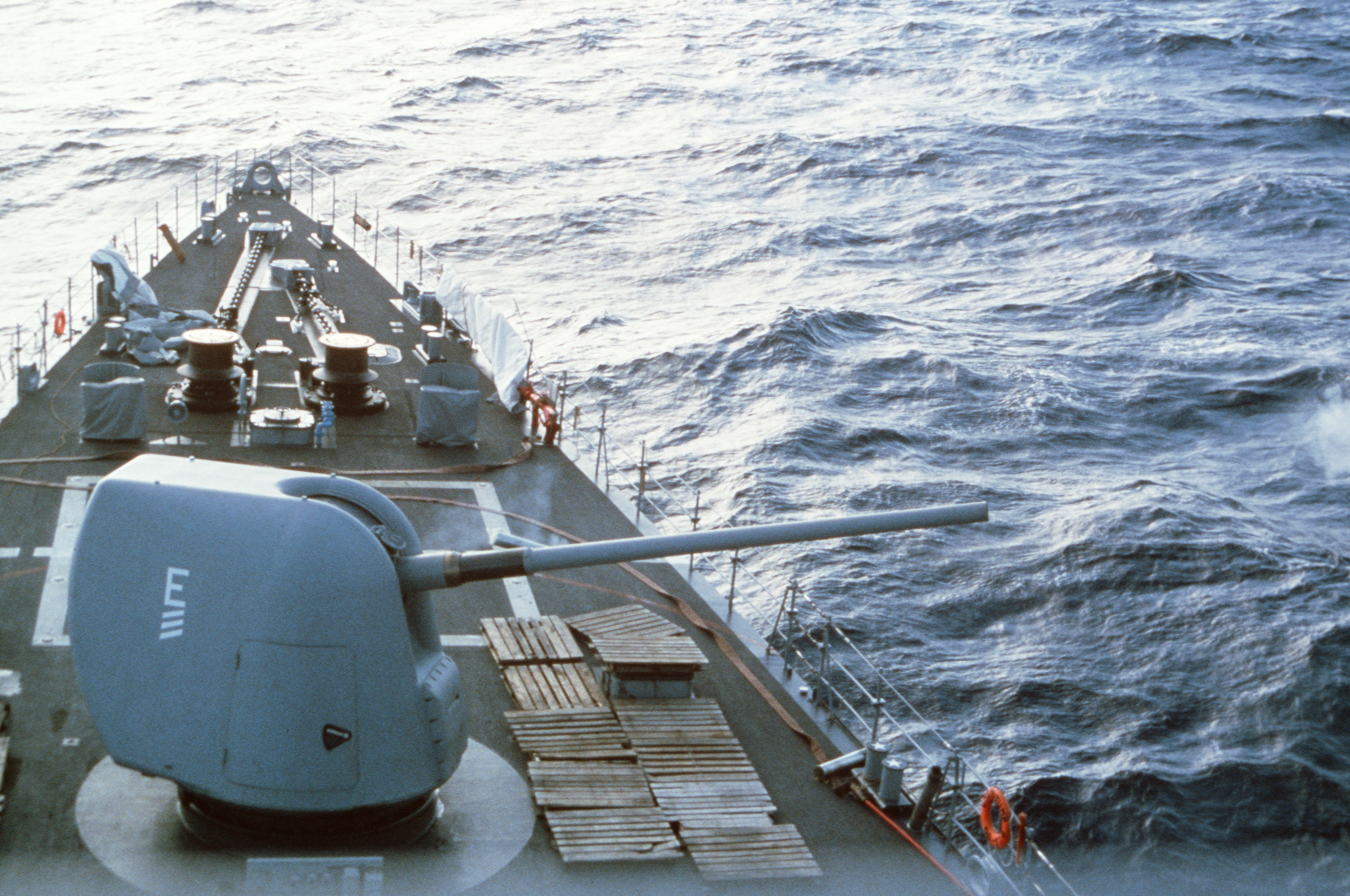
USS Stump's 5-inch gun in 1988

In 1988, Stump deployed to the Mediterranean as part of the USS Dwight D. Eisenhower carrier battle group (MED 3–88). In April, and on 48-hour notice, Stump was directed to detach and proceed to the Persian Gulf to replace the USS Samuel B. Roberts which had suffered extensive damage from a naval mine explosion. After returning from the Gulf Stump was dispatched to meet and escort the Mighty Savant II carrying the damaged Samuel B. Roberts from the Suez canal to Rota Spain during part of its return journey to the US for repairs. Stump returned to Norfolk, Virginia, in August. Stump was underway again in October for six weeks of Caribbean law enforcement operations where she performed a rescue of a sinking drug runner and recovered a shipment of Marijuana, 80 bales of Marijuana were recovered for destruction before the boat sank. Stump was also credited with the identification of a low flying plane whose inspection upon landing in the US accounted for the recovery of several hundred kilos of Cocaine. In December, Stump was presented her second consecutive Battle "E" award by Rear Admiral Donnell, commander of the Naval Surface Force U.S. Atlantic Fleet. In October 1989, Stump again deployed to the Mediterranean as part of the USS Forrestal carrier battle group (MED 1–90). During this deployment, Stump was extremely successful in conducting anti-submarine warfare exercises and was once again presented the "Hookem" award for excellence in undersea warfare.

=== 1990s ===
In August 1990, Stump transited to Avondale Shipyard in New Orleans, Louisiana, for overhaul and major combat systems upgrade. She received the Vertical Launch System (VLS) for the BGM-109 Tomahawk missile. Stump also received the integrated AN/SQQ-89 USW system.

In November 1992, Stump deployed to the Persian Gulf and Northern Red Sea as part of MEF (1–93) to serve as a ready strike platform. The highlight of the deployment was the Tomahawk missile strike launched against Iraq in support of Operation Southern Watch on 17 January 1993.

In July 1994, Stump again deployed to South America for UNITAS XXXV serving as the flagship for the commander of the U.S. South Atlantic Force. Stump re-visited eight South American nations, as well as completing another transit of the Chilean inland waterway.

In February 1995, Stump deployed to the Caribbean Sea in support of counter drug operations, transiting the Panama Canal. During this period Stump participated in a search and rescue mission in the Pacific. In cooperation with a Colombian Coast Guard cutter, Stump located and recovered a survivor of a wrecked Colombian vessel. Stump returned in April 1995.

As part of a reorganization announced in mid-1995 of the Atlantic Fleet's surface combatant ships into six battle groups, nine destroyer squadrons and a new Western Hemisphere Group, Stump was reassigned to Destroyer Squadron Two. The reorganization was to be phased in over the summer and take effect on 31 August, with homeport shifts to occur through 1998.

Stump deployed in August 1996 for a Middle Eastern Force cruise to conduct maritime interception operations and act as ready strike destroyer in the Persian Gulf. Stump relieved USS Laboon on 28 September as the maritime interception operations/strike platform in the northern Persian Gulf. While in the Persian Gulf, Stump completed over 40 boardings in support of maritime interdiction operations and participated in 11 Persian Gulf Tomahawk exercises, including one as launch area coordinator. A mainstay during this deployment, Stump remained underway for over eighty percent of the time she was in the Persian Gulf.

Following the return from her Middle Eastern Force deployment in February 1997, Stump conducted an extensive dry-docking selected restricted availability and immediately commenced a training cycle which culminated in a final evaluation period. In January 1998 Stump commenced work-ups for its upcoming Sixth Fleet deployment by participating in COMPTUEX and JTFEX as part of the Eisenhower carrier battle group.

In March 1998 the Sara Ann (a fishing trawler) was operating off the Virginia Capes when the seas became too much and she started taking on water. Stump, while conducting routine operations on 17 April 1998, was informed by United States Coast Guard Station Portsmouth that the Sara Ann was in distress. Stump subsequently rescued four civilians about 65 nautical miles off Cape Hatteras, North Carolina. Stump provided safe passage back to Norfolk, Virginia.

Stump deployed to the Mediterranean as part of Sixth Fleet in June 1998. Stump, as part of Destroyer Squadron Two, joined five other nations and other U.S. Navy warships in the central Mediterranean for the execution of SHAREM 125, from 9 to 15 July 1998. SHAREM 125 was the latest in a series of SHAREM exercises designed to test and evaluate undersea warfare tactics, weapons, sensors and procedures. SHAREM is an established in 1969 to continuously improve the quality of undersea warfare.

=== 2000s ===
Stump took part in the Fleet Battle Experiment Hotel (FBE-H) which was conducted by units of the U.S. 2nd Fleet and personnel of the Navy Warfare Development Command (NWDC) from 28 August to 12 September 2000 off the Virginia Capes and in the Gulf of Mexico. This was the eighth in a series of fleet battle experiments designed to evaluate new naval warfare concepts and technological capabilities. Under U.S. Joint Forces Command's overarching experiment, "Millennium Challenge 00", FBE-H ran concurrently with the U.S. Army's Joint Contingency Force Advanced Warfighting Experiment, the U.S. Air Force Joint Contingency Force Experiment 2000 and the U.S. Marine Corps' Millennium Dragon.

The focus of FBE-H was the application of network-centric operations in gaining and sustaining access in support of follow-on joint operations. Access denial was expected to be the focus of any potential adversary's strategy. Specifically, FBE-H further developed NWDC's draft Access Concept entitled "Poseidon's Presence". In addition, the NATO exercise "Unified Spirit" ran concurrently with the JTFEX, with forces from Canada, Denmark, France, Germany and the United Kingdom playing major roles.

Stump deployed in late November 2000 with the USS Harry S. Truman carrier battle group. Prior to that, Stump took part in Joint Task Force Exercise (JTFEX) 01–1, to certify the carrier battle group for deployment. This was the first deployment for Truman, which had been commissioned in 1998. The deployment included extensive operations in the Mediterranean Sea, Indian Ocean and primarily the Persian Gulf. While operating in the Persian Gulf, the Truman battle group enforced United Nations sanctions against Iraq by diverting 22 vessels with more than $5 million of suspected contraband cargo. Throughout the deployment, the battle group also participated in numerous international exercises, including Arabian Gauntlet, an 11-nation exercise that involved more than 20 ships. Additionally, U.S. sailors worked with military forces from Oman, Jordan, Tunisia, Kuwait, Bahrain and the United Arab Emirates, improving interoperability and strengthening relationships with those countries. Stump, along with the rest of the battle group ships returned home on 24 May 2001.

In mid-October 2003 Stump operated off the coast of Argentina with the frigate USS Robert G. Bradley as part of the annual UNITAS exercise which involved naval forces from Argentina, Brazil, Peru, Spain and Uruguay.

=== Deployments and ports of call ===
MED-MEF 3–88: Rota Spain, Ibiza Spain, Marseille France, Cavaliere France, Genoa Italy, ASU Bahrain, with a brief stop for Suez Canal traffic in Port Said Egypt and a brief stop for fuel in Djibouti.

== Fate ==
Stump was decommissioned 22 October 2004. Admiral Stump's great-grandson, John Stump III served on the decommissioning crew in 2004. She was laid up at the inactive ships maintenance facility in Philadelphia, Pennsylvania, and sunk as a target along with her sister, Comte de Grasse off the coast of North Carolina on 7 June 2006.

== Ship's crest ==
The distinguished naval career of Admiral Felix Stump is reflected in the ship's coat of arms.

The many decorations received by Admiral Stump for his exemplary service in the Pacific Theater during World War II are represented in the shield. The blue silhouette cross refers to the Navy Cross twice awarded him while in command of Carrier Division 24; the white central star denotes the Silver Star Medal awarded "for conspicuous gallantry and intrepidity in action" against enemy-held islands. The Legion of Merit (which he was awarded three times) is indicated by the crossed arrows in scarlet and white. The U.S. Army Distinguished Service Medal, received for exceptionally meritorious services as commander of a combined operations center during the early part of the war, is represented by the colors scarlet, white and blue, the colors of the suspension ribbon of the medal. The four smaller stars in gold are in recognition of the attainment of the rank of admiral. The gold shield is symbolic of knowledge and achievement.

== Gallery ==
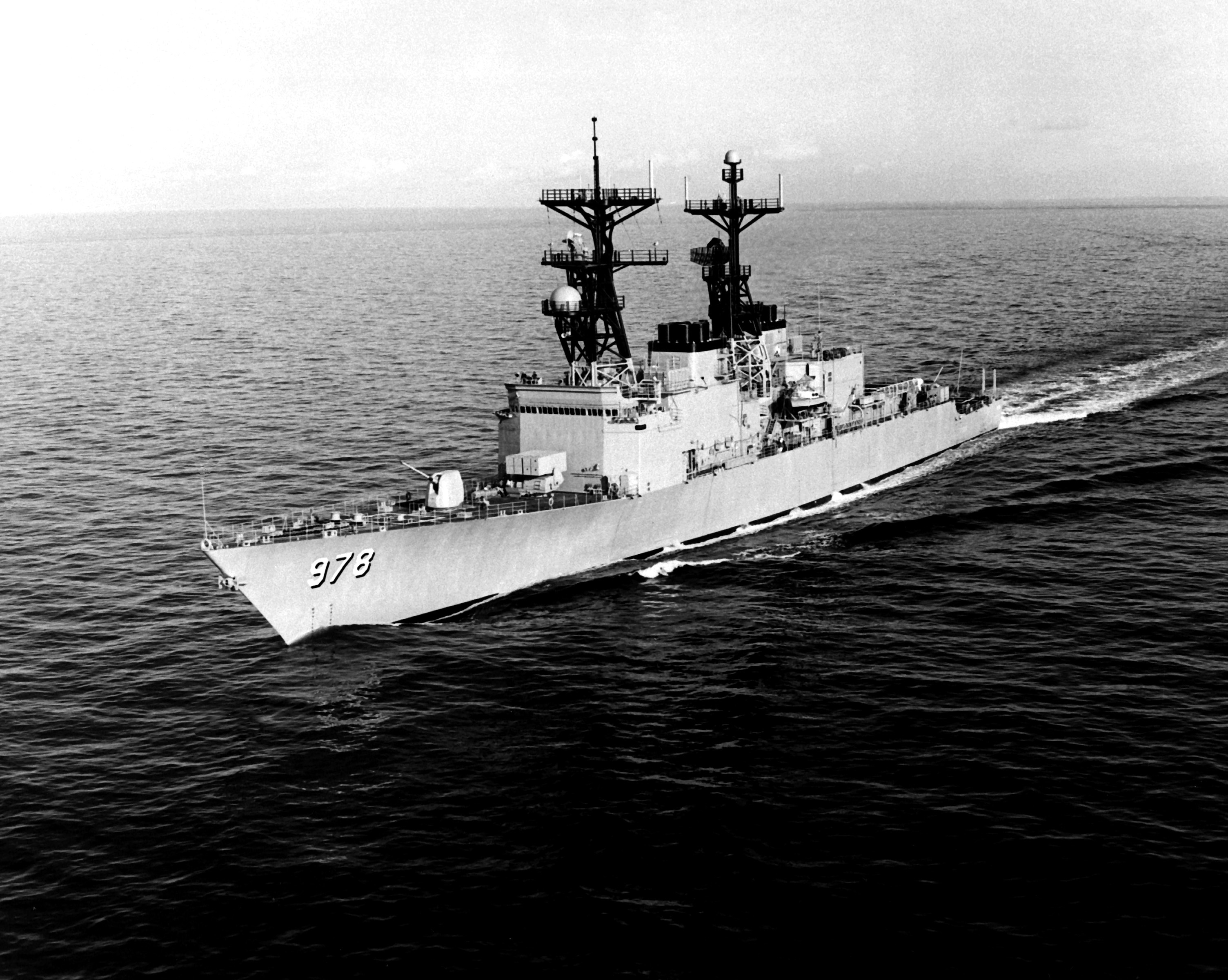
USS Stump in 1982

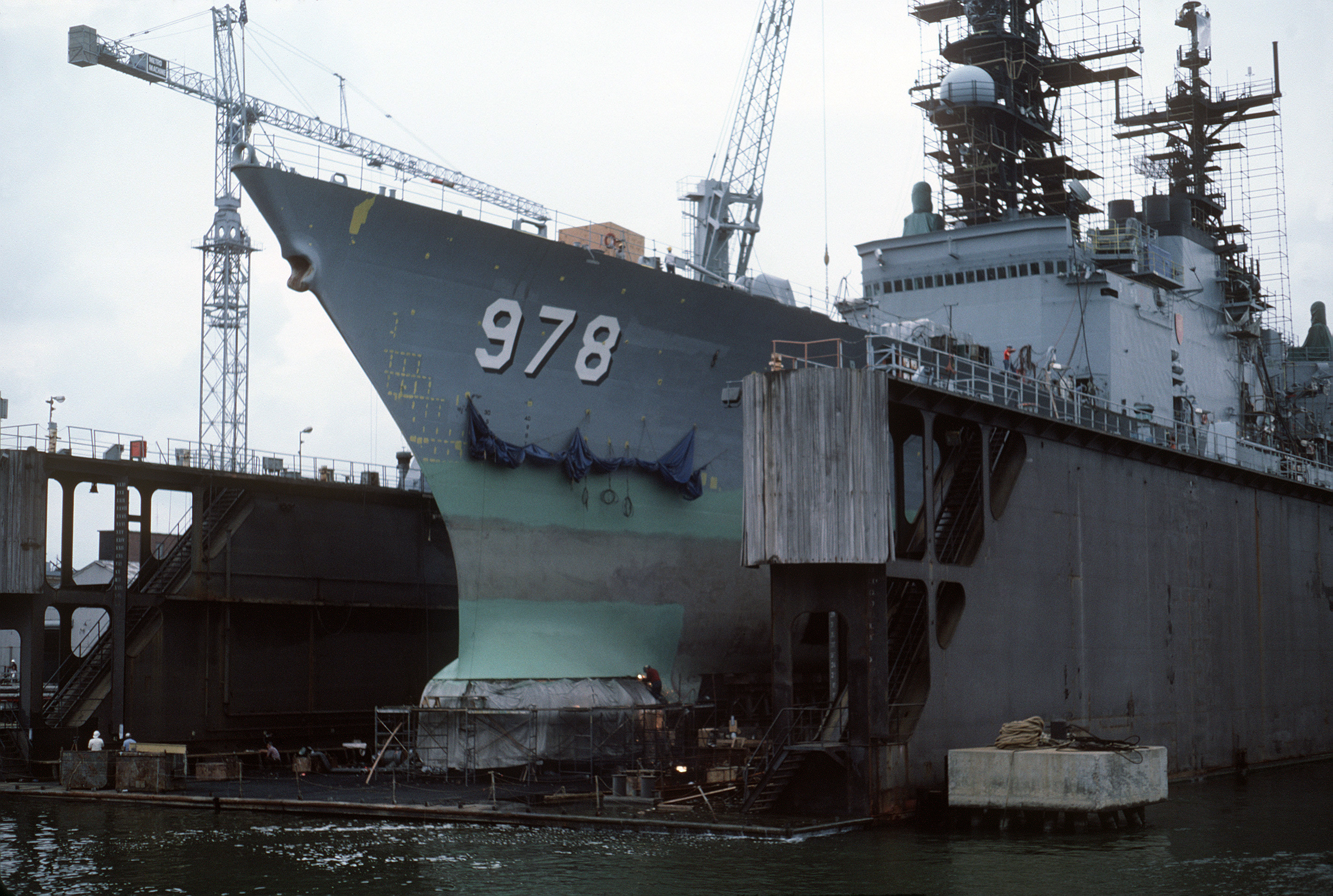
USS Stump on 12 August 1986

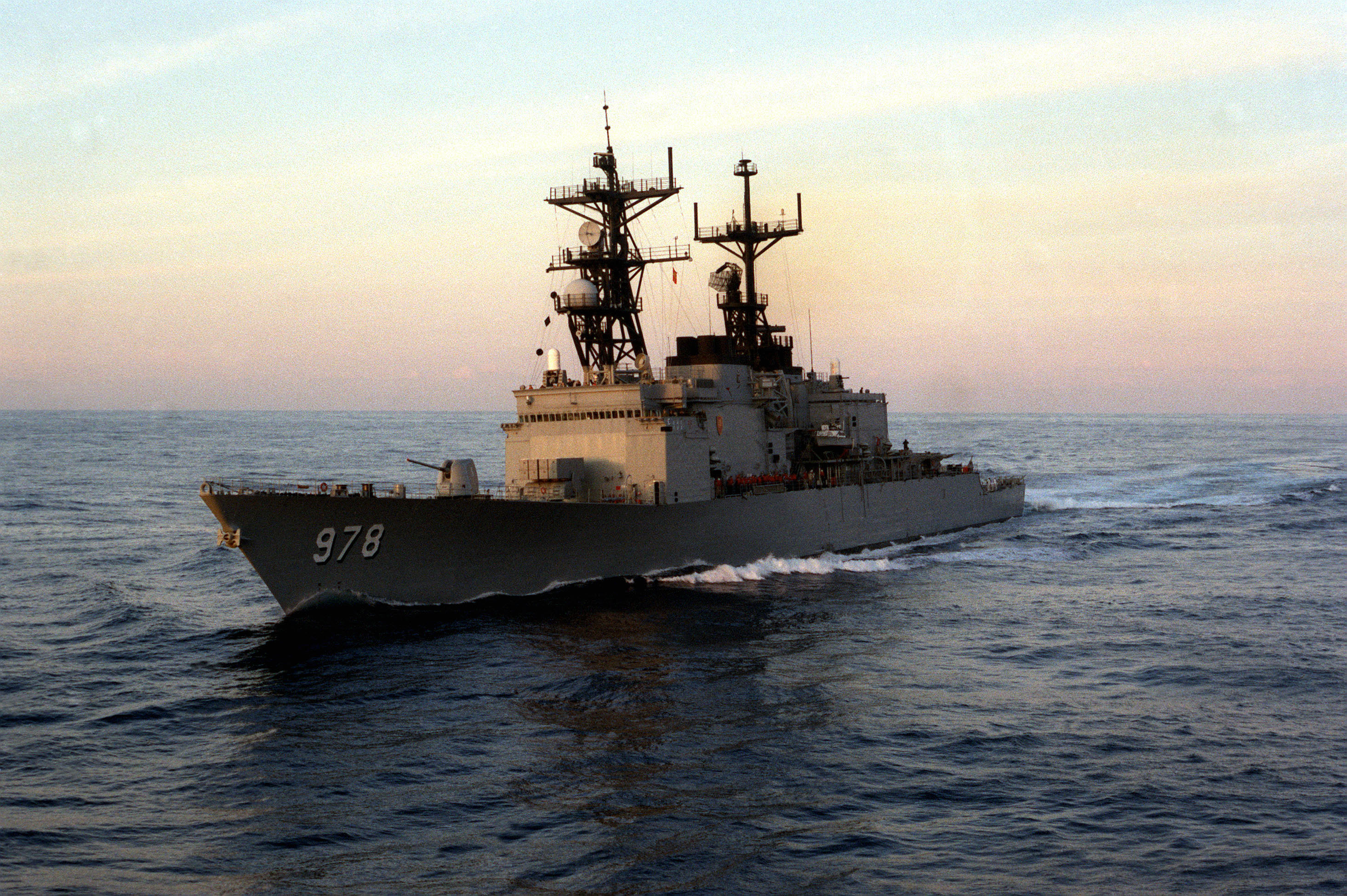
USS Stump on 1 February 1988

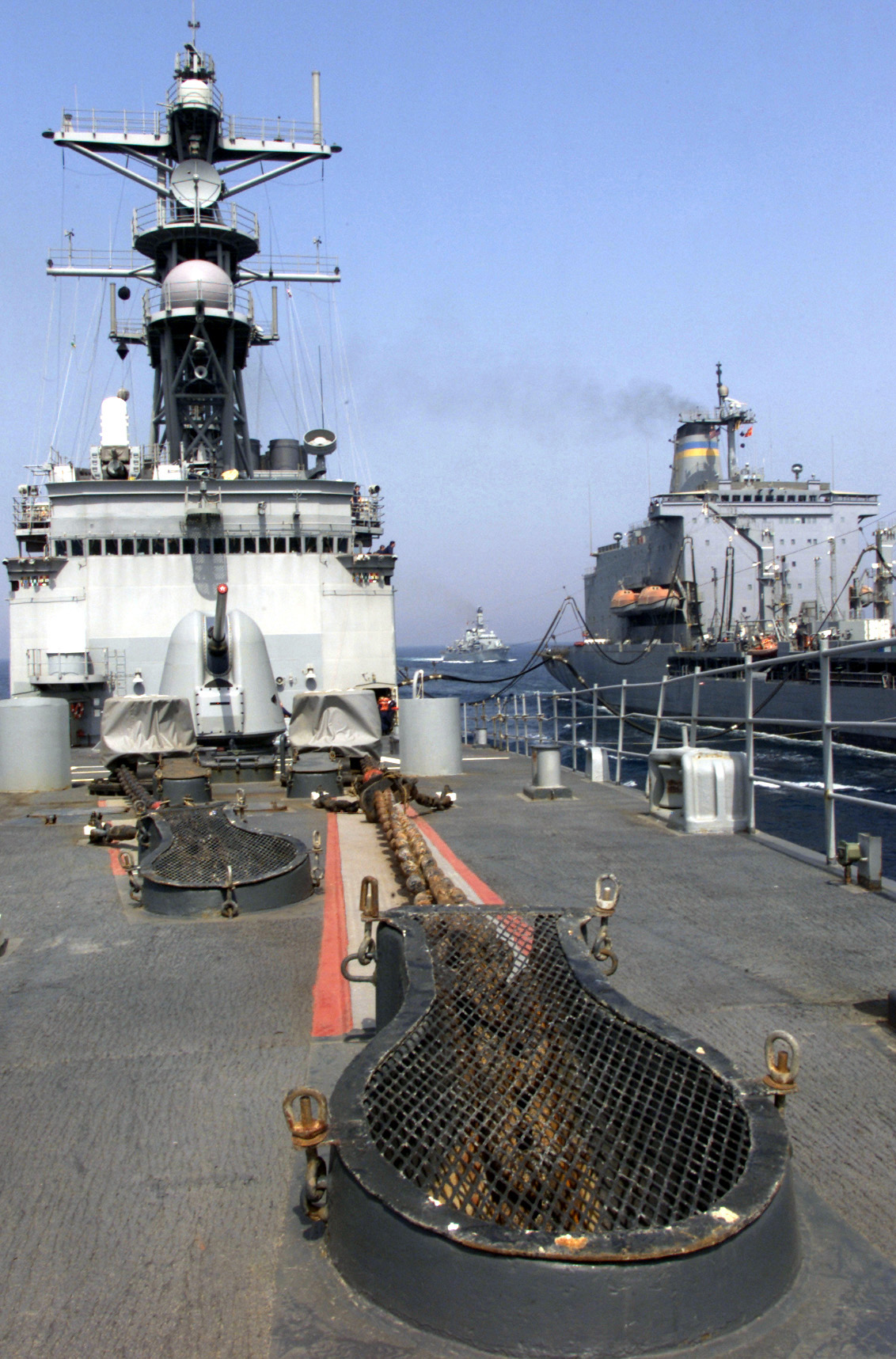
USS Stump and USNS Kanawha on 30 March 2001

== See also ==
- List of destroyers of the United States Navy
