= Tilly, Yvelines =

Tilly
- Commune
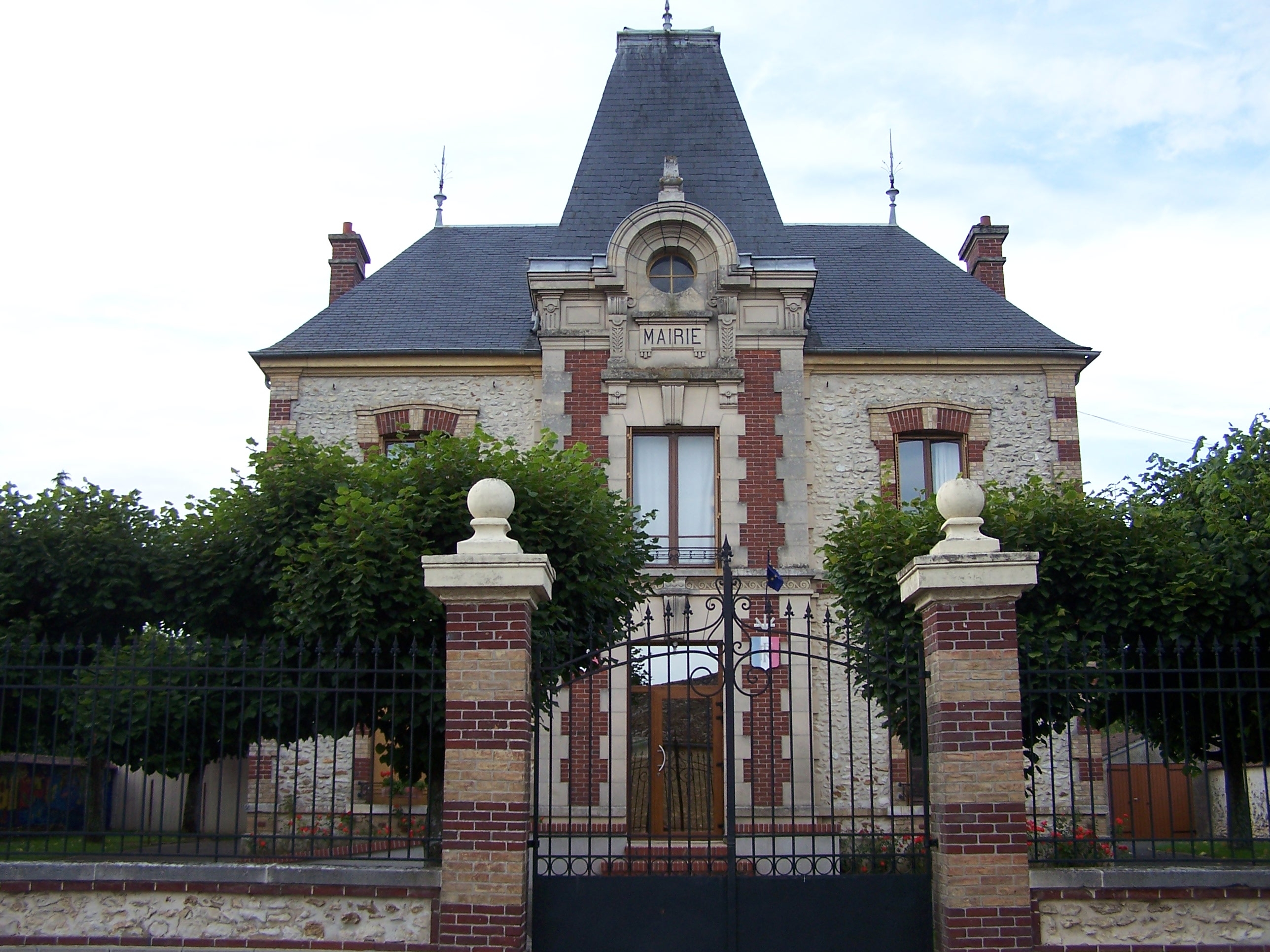
- Town hall
- Location of Tilly
- Location within France Location within Île-de-France (region)
- Coordinates: 48°52′59″N 1°34′35″E
- Country: France
- Region: Île-de-France
- Department: Yvelines
- Arrondissement: Mantes-la-Jolie
- Canton: Bonnières-sur-Seine
- Intercommunality: Pays houdanais

Government
  - Mayor (2020–2026): Jean-Claude Robin
- Area^{1}: 7.80 km^{2} (3.01 sq mi)
- Elevation: 126 m (413 ft)
- Highest elevation: 152 m (499 ft)
- Lowest elevation: 109 m (358 ft)
- Population (2023): 530
  - Density: 68/km^{2} (180/sq mi)
- Time zone: UTC+01:00 (CET)
  - Summer (DST): UTC+02:00 (CEST)
- INSEE/Postal code: 78618 /78790
- ^{1} French Land Register data, which excludes lakes, ponds, glaciers > 1 km^{2} (0.386 sq mi or 247 acres) and river estuaries.

Tilly is a commune in the Yvelines department in the Île-de-France region in north-central France.

== See also ==
- Communes of the Yvelines department
