= USS De Grasse (AK-223) =

Cargo ship of the United States Navy

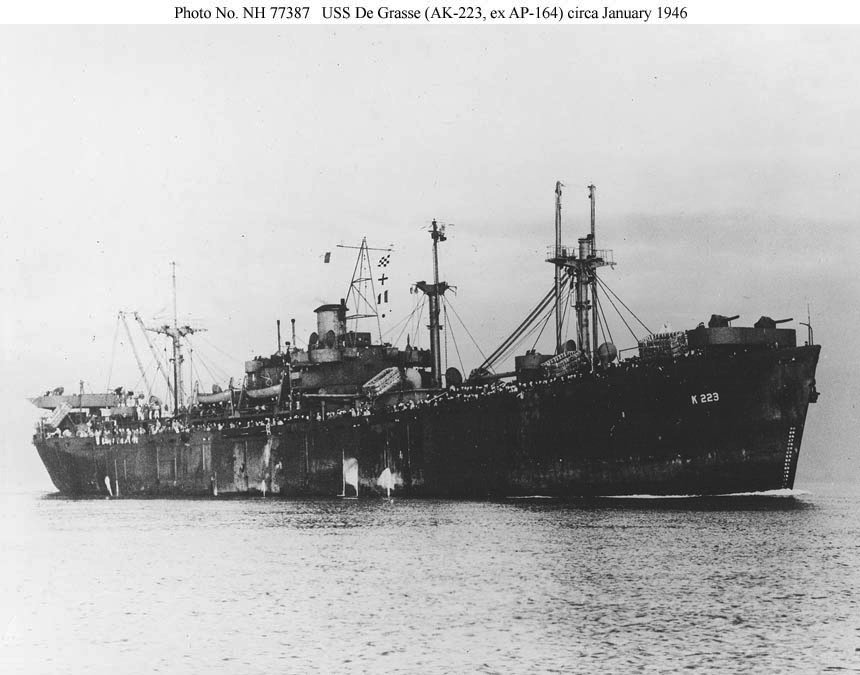
- USS De Grasse (AK-223) in San Francisco Bay, c. January 1946. The rails are crowded with troops returning home on this Magic Carpet voyage.

History

United States
- Name: Nathaniel J. Wyeth; De Grasse
- Namesake: Nathaniel J. Wyeth; François Joseph Paul de Grasse
- Ordered: as a type (EC2-S-C1 hull), MCE hull 1598, SS Nathaniel J. Wyeth
- Builder: Oregon Shipbuilding Corporation, Portland, Oregon
- Laid down: 31 January 1943
- Launched: 24 February 1943
- Sponsored by: Mrs. Vincent Palmer
- Acquired: 28 October 1943
- Commissioned: 8 November 1943, USS De Grasse (AP-164)
- Decommissioned: 28 March 1946
- Reclassified: 20 August 1944, AK-223
- Refit: converted for Naval service at United Engineering Co., Alameda, CA.
- Stricken: 17 April 1946
- Identification: Hull symbol: AP-164; Hull symbol: AK-223
- Honors and awards: 3 × battle stars
- Fate: Sold for scrapping, 10 February 1970

General characteristics
- Class & type: Crater-class cargo ship
- Displacement: 4,023 long tons (4,088 t) (standard); 14,550 long tons (14,780 t) (full load)
- Length: 441 ft 6 in (134.57 m)
- Beam: 56 ft 11 in (17.35 m)
- Draft: 28 ft 4 in (8.64 m)
- Installed power: 2 × Babcock & Wilcox header-type boilers, 220psi 450°; 2,500 shp (1,900 kW)
- Propulsion: 1 × Iron Fireman triple-expansion reciprocating steam engine; double Westinghouse Main Reduction Gears; 1 × shaft
- Speed: 12.5 kn (23.2 km/h; 14.4 mph)
- Troops: 1176 officers and enlisted
- Complement: 256 officers and enlisted
- Armament: 1 × 5 in (130 mm)/38 caliber dual-purpose gun; 4 × 3 in (76 mm)/50 caliber dual-purpose gun

USS De Grasse (AP-164/AK-223), originally SS Nathaniel J. Wyeth, was a Crater-class cargo ship active with the United States Navy during World War II. It was the second ship of the Navy to bear the name De Grasse, named after French Admiral François Joseph Paul de Grasse.

== Construction ==
De Grasse was launched 24 February 1943, as liberty ship SS Nathaniel J. Wyeth by the Oregon Shipbuilding Corporation, Portland, Oregon, under a Maritime Commission contract. She was sponsored by Mrs. V. Palmer, acquired by the Navy on 28 October 1943, and converted by the United Engineering Company in Alameda, California. De Grasse was commissioned 8 November 1943. She was reclassified AK-223, 20 August 1944.

== World War II Pacific Theatre operations ==
=== Supporting the Allied invasion forces ===
De Grasse sailed from Port Hueneme, California, 22 November 1943, with construction battalion troops and cargo, arriving at Pearl Harbor 2 December. Along with training assault troops in the Hawaiians, she carried men and equipment to the Marshalls and Gilberts on two voyages in February and March 1944. On 29 May she departed Pearl Harbor for the invasion of the Marianas, and between 20 and 25 June and again on 2 and 3 July lay off Saipan to land reinforcements. De Grasse returned to Pearl Harbor 27 July and until the end of 1944 transported troops among the Marshalls, the Gilberts, and the Marianas, and trained men in the Hawaiian area for amphibious assaults.

De Grasse sailed from Pearl Harbor 17 January 1945, to carry troops from Eniwetok, Guam, Saipan, and Majuro to Ulithi, staging point for the Okinawa operation. De Grasse arrived off Okinawa 26 April, and the following day landed men and supplies at Ie Shima. After two voyages to carry Army hospital units from Nouméa and Espiritu Santo to Okinawa, she sailed from Okinawa 5 August for San Francisco and overhaul.

=== End-of-war activity ===
De Grasse was assigned to Operation Magic Carpet duty after the war. She returned to San Francisco 23 January 1946, was decommissioned 28 March 1946, and delivered to the War Shipping Administration the same day for disposal.

De Grasse received three battle stars for World War II service.
