= USS De Grasse (ID-1217) =

Patrol vessel of the United States Navy

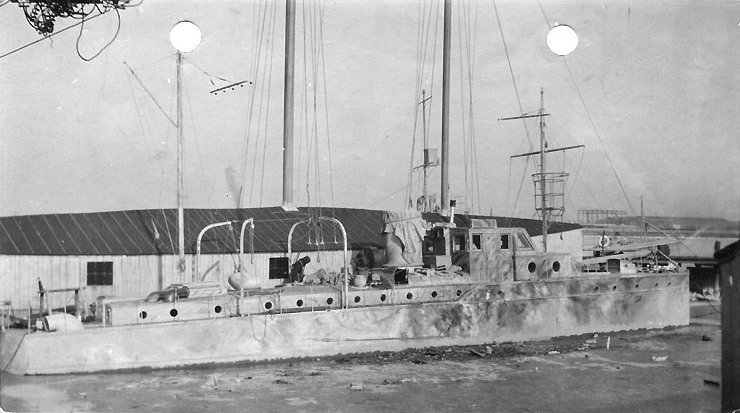
- De Grasse ca. 1918

History

United States
- Name: USS De Grasse
- Namesake: Admiral Comte de Grasse (1722-1788) (previous name retained)
- Builder: George Lawley and Son Corporation, Neponset, Massachusetts
- Completed: 1918
- Acquired: 18 July 1918
- Commissioned: Probably never, but possibly in commission briefly from July 1918 (see main text)
- Identification: Official No. 218211; Signal: LRKJ; Callsign: WD7676
- Fate: Returned to owner 7 November 1918

General characteristics
- Type: Patrol vessel
- Length: 81 ft 2.5 in (24.752 m)
- Beam: 13 ft (4.0 m)
- Draft: 6 ft 8.5 in (2.045 m) (mean)
- Propulsion: Steam turbine
- Speed: 14.5 knots
- Armament: 1 × 3-pounder gun; 1 × machine gun

USS De Grasse (ID-1217) was the projected name for an armed yacht that the United States Navy acquired for service as a patrol vessel in 1918 but, according to some sources, never commissioned, although other sources claim she saw brief naval service in 1918. In World War II, she was reacquired and served as YP-506. The yacht's official number was registered under the name Fleet as of 1959, fate unknown.

== History ==
De Grasse was under construction as a wooden-hulled, steam turbine-powered private yacht by George Lawley and Sons at Neponset, Massachusetts, for J. L. Redmond of New York City on 7 June 1917 when the U.S. Navy ordered her taken over for World War I service upon completion and assigned her the Naval Registry Identification Number (Id. No.) 1217. She was completed in 1918, and Commandant, 1st Naval District, took control of her on 18 July 1918 in anticipation of commissioning her as USS De Grasse.

On 27 July 1918, the Commandant received orders to have De Grasse inspected for naval service. Tests and sea trials quickly took place at the Boston Navy Yard in Boston, Massachusetts, and revealed, as stated in a report dated 31 July 1918, that De Grasse was "unseaworthy" and of "no value for naval operations."

Sources differ on whether De Grasse saw any naval service at all. Some say that she was commissioned in July 1918 and briefly served in coastal waters along the central portion of the United States East Coast, while others claim that the negative 31 July 1918 inspection report led to her never being commissioned or seeing naval service.

Directed on 17 August 1918 to return De Grasse to her owner, Commandant, 1st Naval District, returned her to Redmond on 7 November 1918 and provided him with $500 ($10,702 today) "for restoration of [the] ship [to] its former condition."

De Grasse was reacquired in 1942 for service as a district patrol craft, YP-506. The former yacht was released from service in 1946 and was sold. The yacht's official number was registered with the US Coast Guard under the name Fleet as of 1959. After 1959, the yacht's fate is not known.
