= USS Comte de Grasse =

Spruance-class destroyer

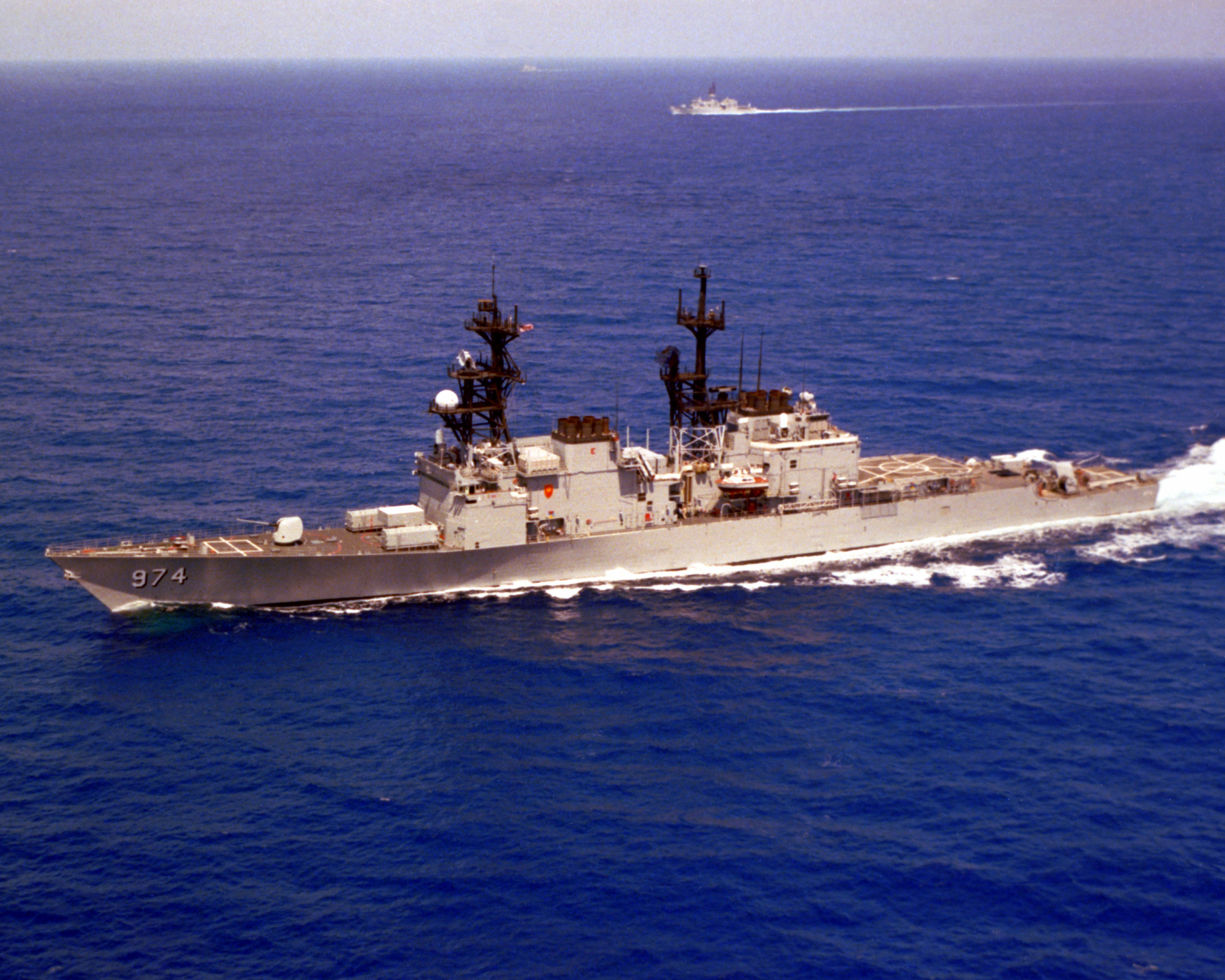
- USS Comte de Grasse in the Indian Ocean on 17 June 1987

History

United States
- Name: Comte de Grasse
- Namesake: François Joseph Paul de Grasse
- Ordered: 26 January 1972
- Builder: Ingalls Shipbuilding
- Laid down: 4 April 1975
- Launched: 26 March 1976
- Acquired: 17 July 1978
- Commissioned: 5 August 1978
- Decommissioned: 5 June 1998
- Stricken: 5 June 1998
- Identification: Callsign: NCDG; Hull number: DD-974
- Motto: Sans Précédent; 'Without Precedent'
- Fate: Sunk as target, 7 June 2006.
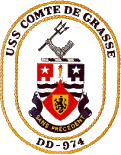
- Badge

General characteristics
- Class & type: Spruance-class destroyer
- Displacement: 8,040 long tons (8,170 t) full load
- Length: 529 ft (161 m) waterline; 563 ft (172 m) overall
- Beam: 55 ft (17 m)
- Draft: 29 ft (8.8 m)
- Installed power: 3 × 501-K17 generator sets (2,000 kW (2,700 hp) each)
- Propulsion: 4 × General Electric LM2500 gas turbines, 2 shafts, 80,000 shp (60 MW)
- Speed: 32.5 knots (60.2 km/h; 37.4 mph)
- Range: 6,000 nmi (11,000 km; 6,900 mi) at 20 knots (37 km/h; 23 mph)
- Complement: 19 officers, 315 enlisted
- Sensors & processing systems: AN/SPS-40 air search radar; AN/SPG-60 fire control radar; AN/SPS-55 surface search radar; AN/SPQ-9 gun fire control radar; Mark 23 TAS automatic detection and tracking radar; AN/SPS-65 missile fire control radar; AN/SQS-53 bow-mounted active sonar; AN/SQR-19 TACTAS towed array passive sonar; Naval Tactical Data System
- Electronic warfare & decoys: AN/SLQ-32 electronic warfare system; AN/SLQ-25 Nixie torpedo countermeasures; Mark 36 SRBOC decoy launching system; AN/SLQ-49 inflatable decoys
- Armament: 2 × 5 in (127 mm) 54 caliber Mark 45 dual purpose guns; 2 × 20 mm Phalanx CIWS Mark 15 guns; 1 × 8 cell ASROC launcher (removed); 1 × 8 cell NATO Sea Sparrow Mark 29 missile launcher; 2 × quadruple Harpoon missile canisters; 2 × Mark 32 triple 12.75 in (324 mm) torpedo tubes (Mk 46 torpedoes); 1 × 61 cell Mk 41 VLS launcher for Tomahawk missiles
- Aircraft carried: 2 × Sikorsky SH-60 Seahawk LAMPS III helicopters
- Aviation facilities: Flight deck and enclosed hangar for up to two medium-lift helicopters

USS Comte de Grasse (DD-974), named for Admiral Francois-Joseph Paul, Comte de Grasse (1722–1788), was a Spruance-class destroyer built by the Ingalls Shipbuilding Division of Litton Industries at Pascagoula, Mississippi. She was laid down 4 April 1975, launched 26 March 1976 and commissioned 5 August 1978. She was christened 21 May 1976 by sponsor Madame Anne-Aymone Sauvage de Brantes, wife of the then-President of France, Valéry Giscard d'Estaing.

== Operational history ==
After being commissioned in August 1978, Comte de Grasse journeyed to homeport in Norfolk, Virginia. She would make a deployment to the Caribbean to participate in training in Guantanamo Bay, Cuba, and Puerto Rico. While there she also made a port call in Nassau, Bahamas. On 2 August 1979, Comte de Grasse suffered a fire in her Number 1 engine room while in Norfolk. Five sailors received minor injuries. The waste heat boiler and electrical gear were damaged. In the Fall of 1979, she deployed to Northern Europe to participate in NATO Exercises. She visited Brest and Dunkirk (France), Hamburg (Germany) and Portsmouth (England).

=== 1980s ===
In the early Spring of 1980, Comte de Grasse visited New York City, the hometown of Captain Frank J. Lugo. In late February-early March 1980, Comte de Grasse took part in Exercise Safepass-80. Comte de Grasse sailed on her maiden Mediterranean deployment in April 1980, returning home in December. Since then she deployed there six times.

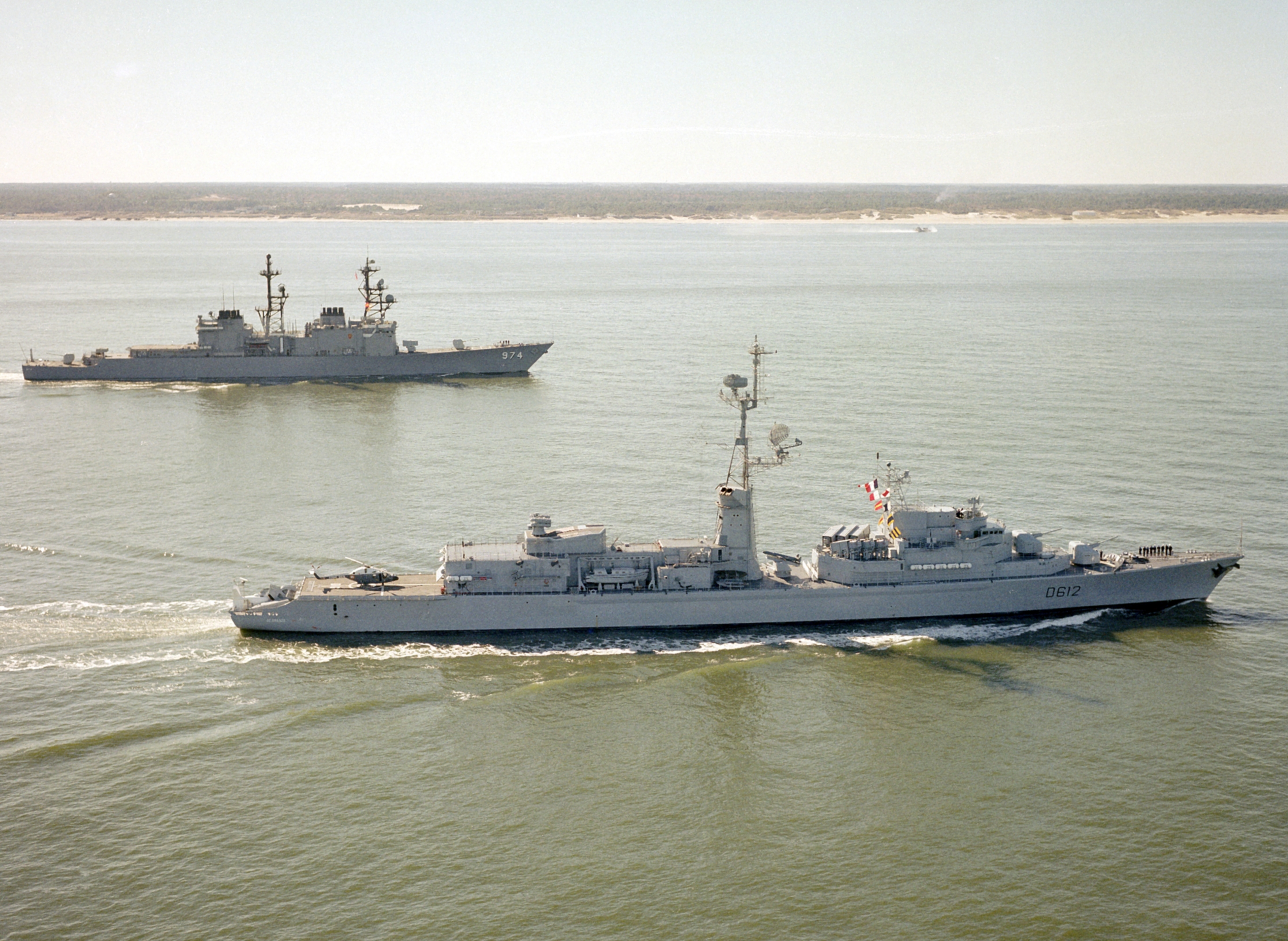
USS Comte de Grasse and French destroyer De Grasse in Chesapeake Bay, in 1981 in honor of the bicentennial of the Battle of Yorktown.

In February 1981, Comte de Grasse went to the Vieques NGFS Range. The following month, she took part in READEX 1–81. In May, she took part in a Comprehensive Training Unit Exercise (COMPTUEX) in the Virginia Capes Operations Area. In late August, she took part in Ocean Venture-81 and exercise Magic Sword. In September, she took part in Exercise Ocean Safari-81. She was drydocked for a short period in November for voyage repairs and replacement of her Sonar Dome Rubber Window, before departing for a Mediterranean deployment on 1 December.

1982 saw Comte de Grasse take part in Exercise Sardinia-82 from 27 February to 9 March. She then took part in Exercise Northern Wedding/United Effort-82 from 23 August to 20 October. From 7 to 14 December, she took part in COMPTUEX 1–83.

From 8 January to 10 July 1983, she deployed to join NATO's Standing Naval Forces Atlantic. During that time, she took part in Exercise Roebuck near Scotland, Spring Train off Gibraltar, Bright Horizon and May West off Norway, Nor Ops, and Ocean Safari. Upon her return home, she was drydocked from 28 October 1983 to 10 July 1984 for a routine overhaul at Ingalls Shipyard, Pascagoula, MS.

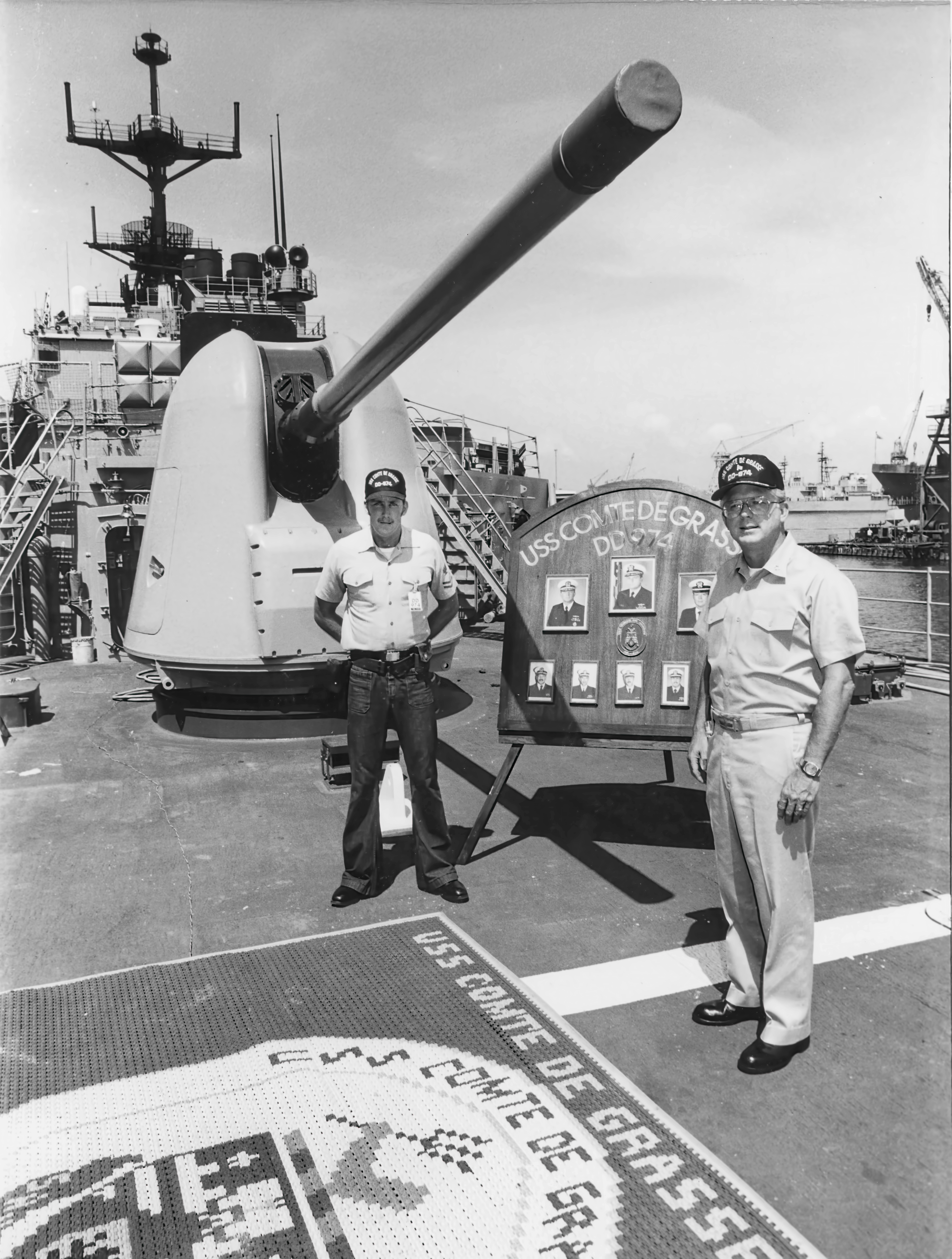
USS Comte de Grasse undergoing overhaul in 1984

From 4 to 13 September, she underwent Harpoon Certification, Tomahawk Material Certification, and from 24 to 26 September, Combat Systems Ship Qualification Test (CSSQT), at the Virginia Capes Operations Area.

From 19 to 23 March 1985, Comte de Grasse underwent Tomahawk Tactical Qualification Test (TTQT). Then from 22 April to 7 May, she participated in COMPTUEX 2–85, before deploying to join the Middle East Force on 6 June. She transited the Suez Canal into the Red Sea on 26 June and entered the Persian Gulf on 4 July. She took part in Exercise Inferno Creek/Bright Star-85 from 11 to 17 August. Transiting though the Suez Canal into the Mediterranean Sea on 15 November, she returned home on 5 December.

1986 saw Comte de Grasse take part in a number of gunnery, air targeting and submarine tracking exercises in the Virginia Capes and Puerto Rico operations areas. From 4 to 8 September, she took part in drug interception operations in the Caribbean.

Comte de Grasse took part, from 9 to 28 January 1987, in BLASTEX 1–87, and from 10 February to 1 March, in FLEETEX 1–87. Then after being drydocked in March on USS Sustain, she took part in Solid Shield 87, from 30 April to 8 May, and FLEETEX 2–87 from 9 to 10 May. She departed for her Mediterranean deployment 3–87 on 6 June and returned home on 17 November.

From 11 to 23 May 1988, Comte de Grasse took part in a USN/FGN missile exercise. Then from 15 June to 1 July, she participated in FLEETEX 2–88 (BASIC). From 12 August to 1 September, she assisted United States Coast Guard law enforcement operations in the Caribbean operations area. Then, from 7 to 22 November, she participated in FLEETEX 1–89 (ADV) and SOCEX 1–89.

From 8 February to 1 March 1989, Comte de Grasse took part in FLEETEX 1–89. She was in drydock from 14 April to 7 May at Norfolk Naval Shipyard, Portsmouth, Virginia, for replacement of its sonar dome rubber window. She deployed on 11 May for her Mediterranean/Indian Ocean deployment 2–89. She transited on 25 June through the Suez Canal into the Red Sea, then from 4–6 July, conducted operations in the Strait of Hormuz, Eastern Patrol Area (SOHEPA). Entering the Persian Gulf on 14 August, she transited the Suez Canal to the Mediterranean Sea on 6 September before returning home on 9 November.

=== 1990s ===
From 16 to 28 January 1990, Comte De Grasse spent time at the Vieques Gunnery Range where she earned the designation of Top Gun of the Year. On 15 February 1990, she was visited by a delegation of the Supreme Soviet of the Soviet Union and the Chairman of the U.S. House Committee on Armed Services, Les Aspin.

1991 saw Comte de Grasse undergo a number of qualification training and tests.

From 6 to 10 January 1992, Comte de Grasse took part in the SWET Competition. Then from 13 January to 13 February, she took part in FLEETEX 2–92; followed by Exercise Fabric Falcon Brave from 26 February to 3 March.

Comte de Grasse's superior performance was again recognized in March 1992 when she was awarded a second consecutive Battle Efficiency Award, representative of the best destroyer in Cruiser – Destroyer Group Eight. This prestigious award encompassed Mission Area Excellence Awards in Navigation and Deck Seamanship, Anti-Submarine Warfare (ASW), Anti-Surface Warfare (ASUW), Electronic Warfare (EW), Anti-Aircraft Warfare (AAW), Engineering, Damage Control, Surface Ship Safety, and Command Control and Communications.

In preparation for her next deployment, Comte de Grasse completed Refresher Training in Guantánamo Bay, Cuba, conducted various battle group exercises in the Caribbean Sea, such as FLEETEX 2–92, and successfully passed a myriad of pre-deployment inspections and exercises, including a Combat Systems Assessment (CSA), in which Comte de Grasse received the highest grade of any unit in the entire U.S. Atlantic Fleet during 1991.

Comte de Grasse departed on her next Mediterranean deployment 2–92 on 6 May. She sailed with the Saratoga carrier battle group to the Mediterranean Sea and the Red Sea. During the deployment, she took part in intense battle group operations, developed and integrated new tactics for small combatants, conducted maritime interdiction operations in the Red Sea, took part in major exercises, such as NATO Display Determination, and supported United Nations humanitarian efforts in the Adriatic Sea near the troubled lands of the former Yugoslavian Republic.

Comte de Grasse transited the Suez Canal into the Red Sea on 7 September, at which point she conducted maritime interdiction force operations until 20 September when she transited the Suez Canal into the Mediterranean Sea. She returned home on 6 November.

One of the highlights of Comte de Grasse's deployment, was her participation in Grasse Day on 19 October 1992. On the occasion, which honors the French Admiral Francois-Joseph Paul, Comte de Grasse, the officers and crew of the ship took part in ceremonies in Grasse and Bar sur Loup, France. In commemorating the day, which is built on and symbolized by Franco-American friendship, the town of Grasse adopted the warship Comte de Grasse, and proclaimed the town's populace as sponsors of Comte de Grasse.

From 18 January to 15 February 1993, Comte de Grasse took part in Operation Sea Signal in the Caribbean Sea. Then from 3 to 25 May, she conducted counter drug operations in the Caribbean. She spent time dry docked in August, then participated in COMPTUEX, in the Caribbean Sea from 19 to 22 October, before finishing off the year with a fleet exercise in the Cherry Point operations area from 1 to 15 December.

On 12 January 1994, the ship's port main reduction gear was discovered to have been sabotaged, resulting in a delay in its deployment and $600,000 in damage ($1.3 million today). It finally got underway for its Mediterranean deployment on 5 February. She conducted operations in the Southern Adriatic in support of Operation Sharp Guard and returned home on 24 June. From 6 September until 1 October, Comte de Grasse took part in Operations Support/Uphold/Restore Democracy in the Haitian operations area.

1995 saw Comte de Grasse take part in CART II, from 7 to 16 January; in COMPTUEX in the Caribbean from 24 April to 14 May; then from 1 July until 3 December, in UNITAS XXXVI-95. UNITAS 95 included operations and port calls in Puerto Rico, Venezuela, Colombia, Ecuador, Peru, Chile, Argentina, Uruguay and Brazil.

From 24 February to 12 March 1996, Comte de Grasse conducted counter drug operations in the Caribbean Sea.

In 1997, she took part in SPONTEX 97–1, from 4 March to 10 April. Then she took part in INDEX 97-3 from 9 to 16 May in the Puerto Rican operations area. Comte de Grasse then took part in UNITAS XXXVIII-97 from 1 July to 26 November 1997.

=== Decommissioning & disposal ===
Comte de Grasse was decommissioned and stricken 5 June 1998 and held at Philadelphia Naval Inactive Ships Maintenance Facility (NISMF) as a parts hulk.

On 7 June 2006, Comte De Grasse was towed approximately 275 nautical miles (509 kilometers; 316 miles) off the coast of North Carolina and sunk along with her sister ship, Stump, as a target during naval training exercises in a water depth of 12,000 feet (3,660 meters).

== Gallery ==
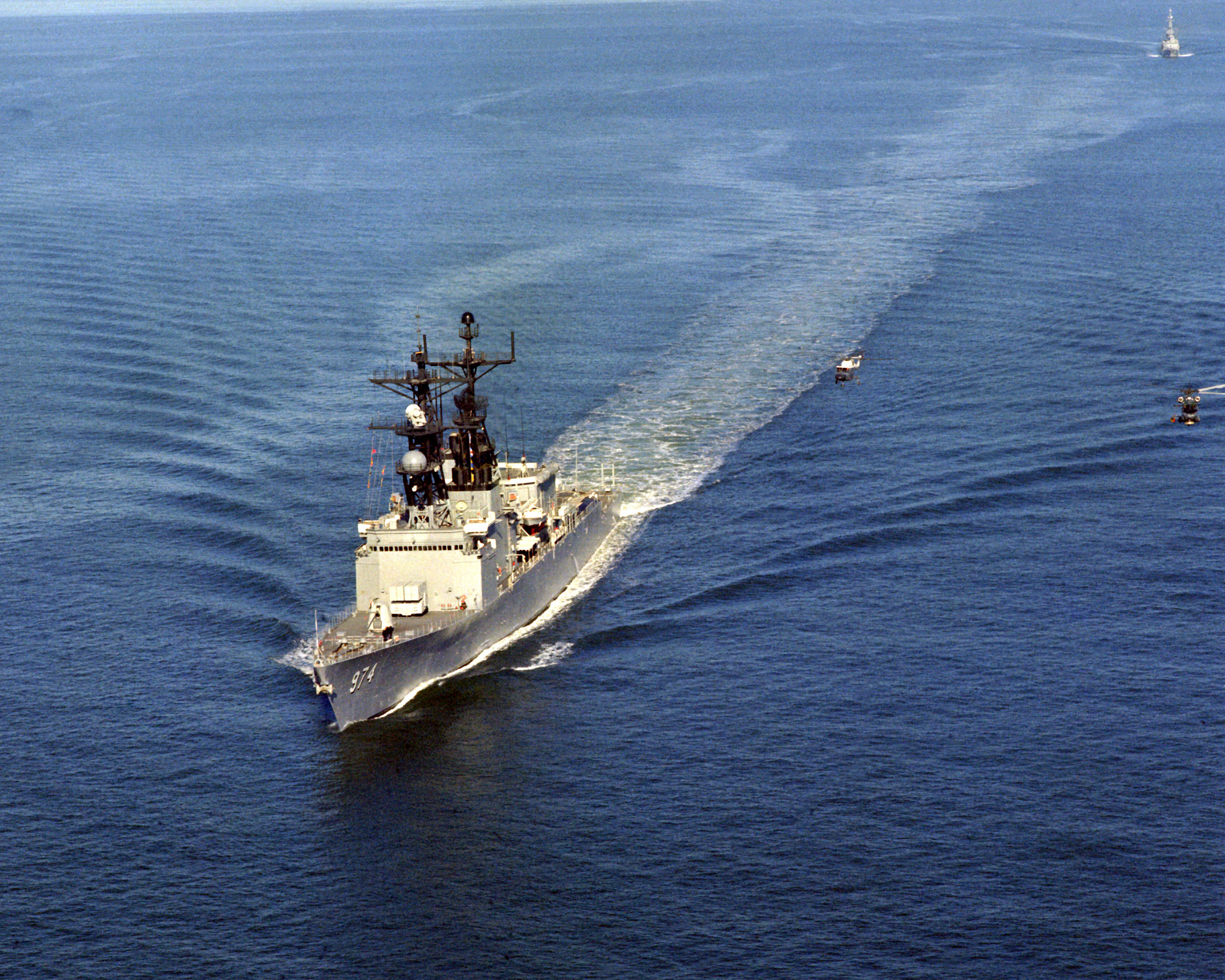
USS Comte de Grasse on 20 October 1981

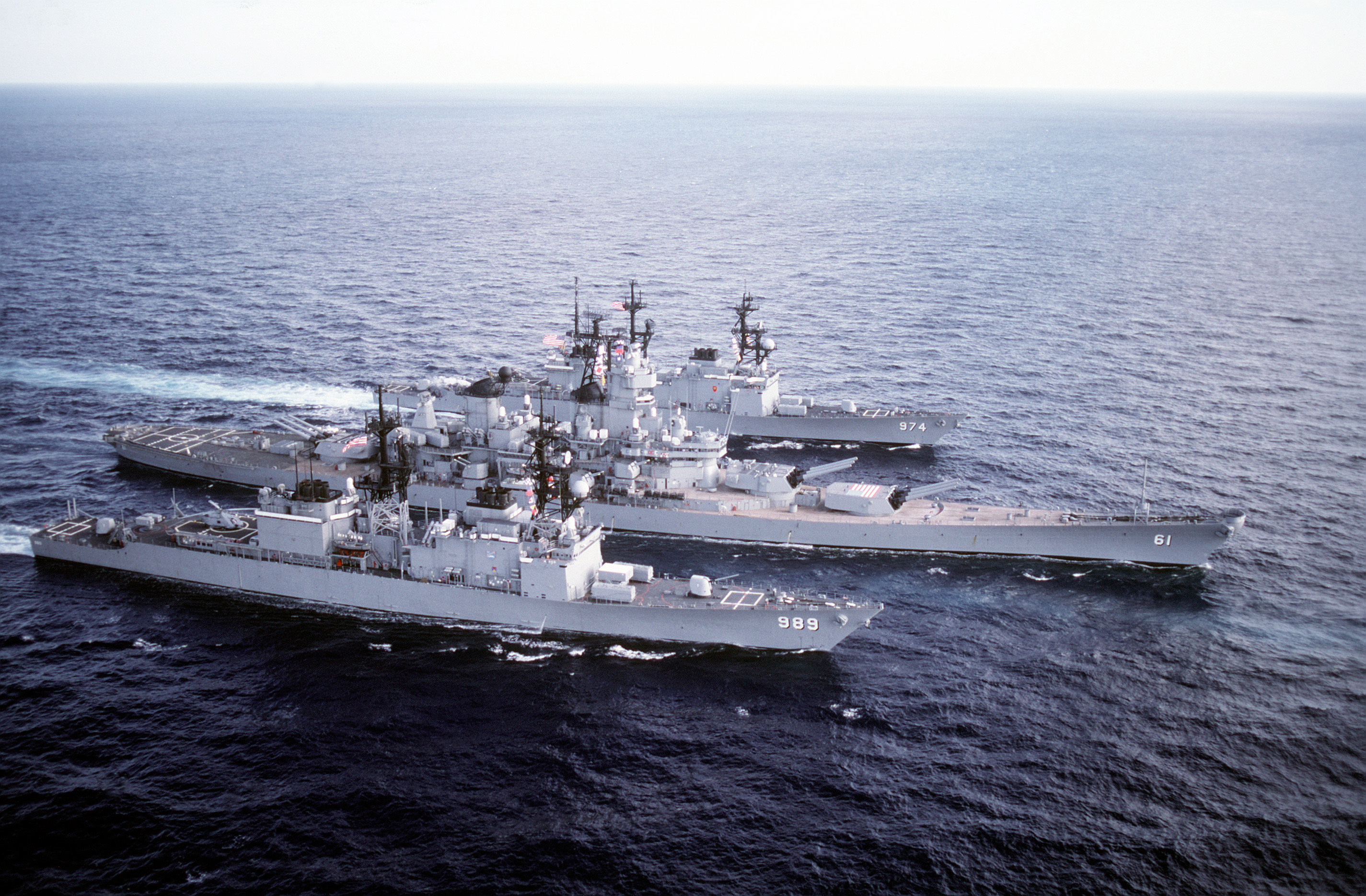
USS Comte de Grasse, USS Iowa and USS Deyo in the Atlantic Ocean on 14 January 1987

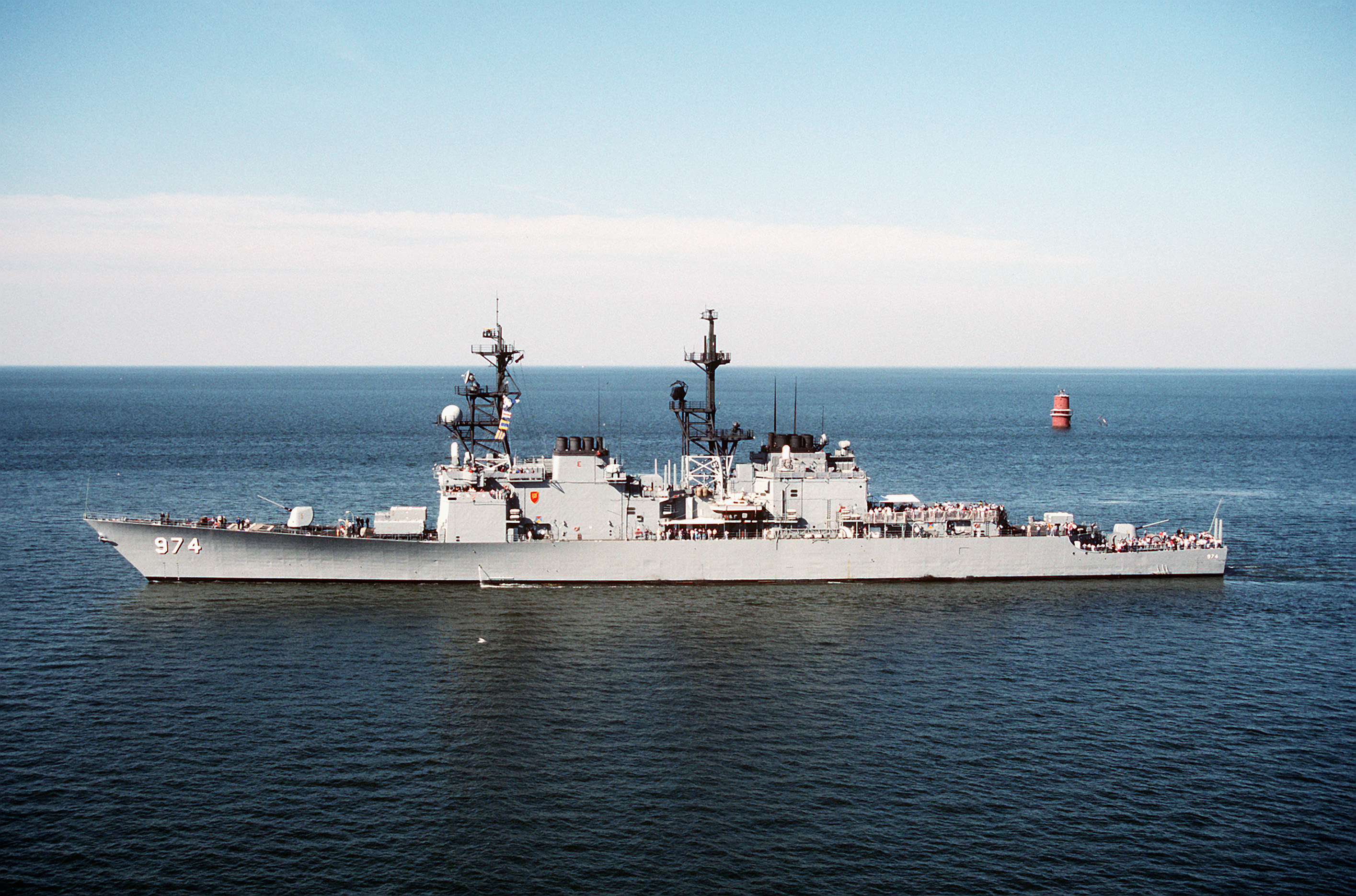
USS Comte de Grasse in Norfolk on 23 March 1990

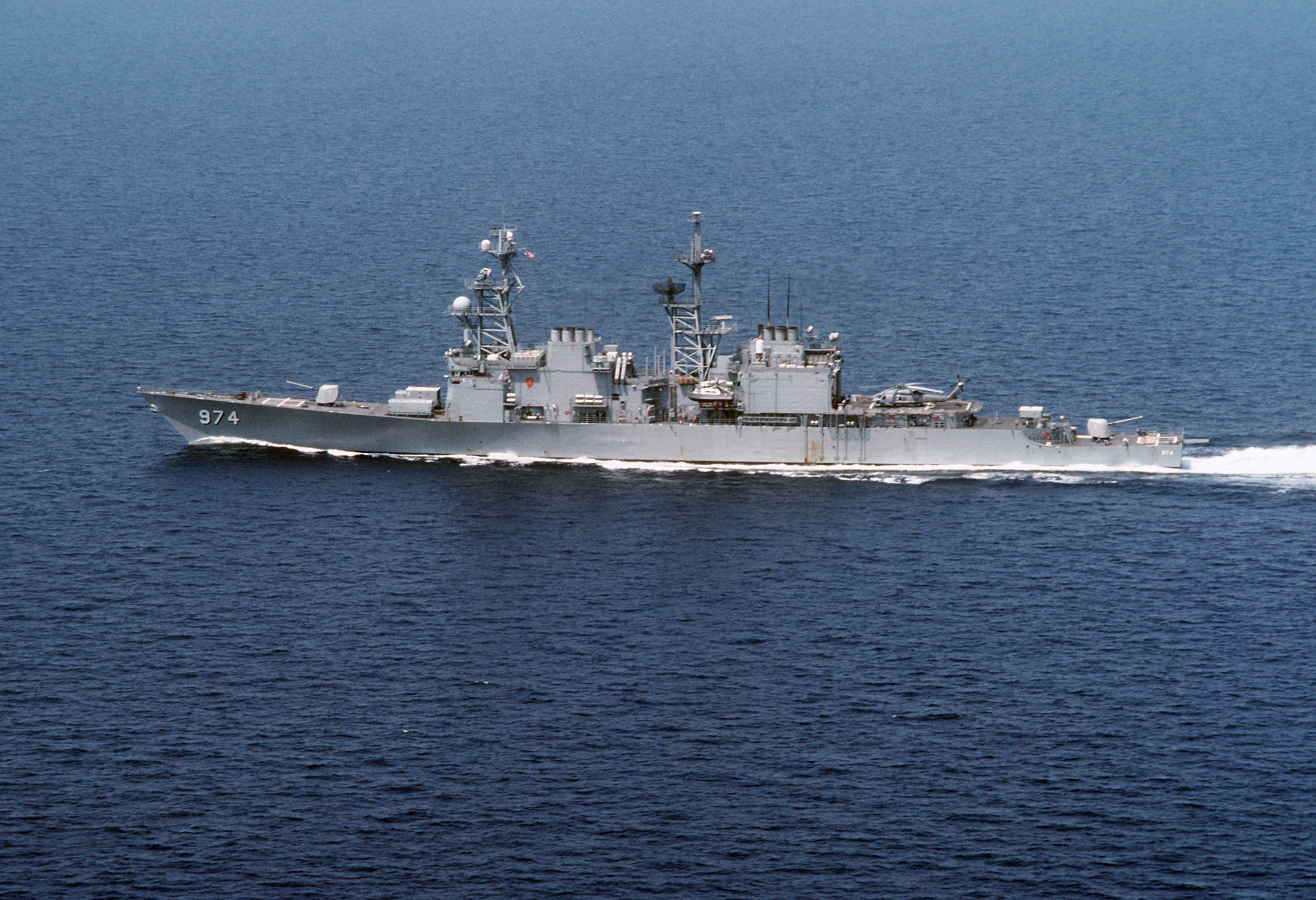
USS Comte de Grasse in the Mediterranean Sea in 1992
