= François Joseph Paul de Grasse =

French naval officer (1722–1788)

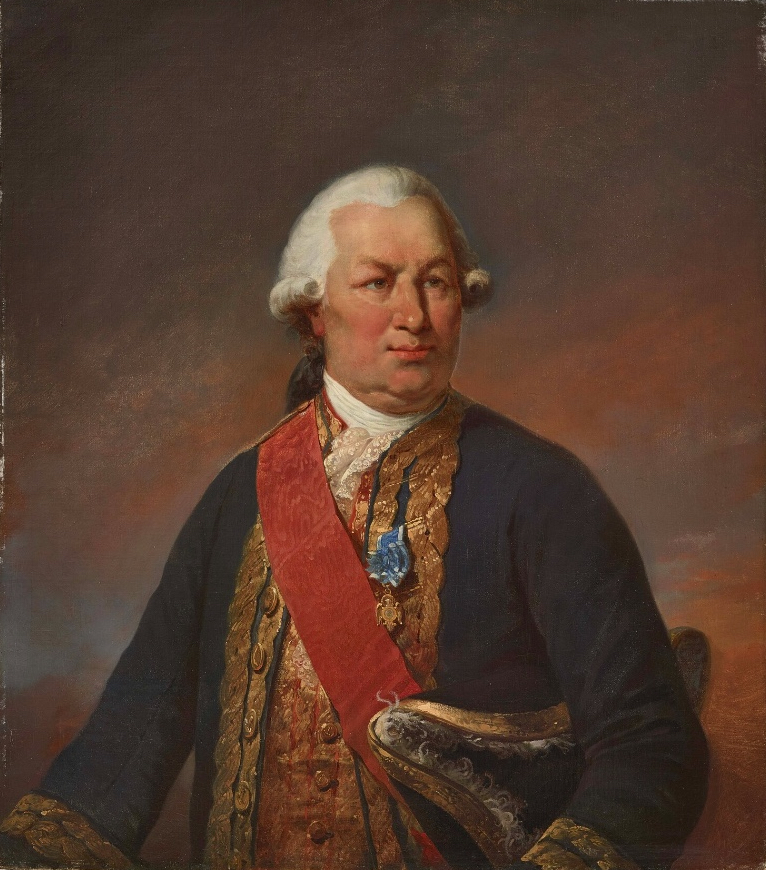
- Portrait by Jean-Baptiste Mauzaisse, 1843
- Born: 13 September 1722; Le Bar-sur-Loup, Provence
- Died: 11 January 1788 (aged 65); Tilly, Île-de-France
- Burial place: Church of Saint-Roch, Paris
- Military career
- Allegiance: Hospitaller Malta; France
- Branch: Navy of the Order of Saint John; French Navy
- Service years: 1734–1788
- Rank: Lieutenant général des armées navales (France)
- Conflicts: War of the Austrian Succession; Battle of Toulon (1744); First Battle of Cape Finisterre (1747); American Revolutionary War; Battle of Ushant (1778); Battle of Grenada; Invasion of Dominica (1778); Battle of St. Lucia; Battle of Martinique (1780); Battle of Fort Royal; Invasion of Tobago; Battle of the Chesapeake; Siege of Yorktown; Battle of Saint Kitts; Siege of Brimstone Hill; Battle of the Saintes

Lieutenant général des armées navales François Joseph Paul, Comte de Grasse, Marquis of Grasse-Tilly, KM (13 September 1722 – 11 January 1788) was a French naval officer. He is best known for his crucial victory over the Royal Navy at the Battle of the Chesapeake in 1781 during the American Revolutionary War. The battle directly led to the Franco-American victory at the siege of Yorktown and helped secure the independence of the United States.

After the battle, de Grasse returned with his fleet to the Caribbean. In 1782, a British fleet under Admiral of the White Sir George Rodney defeated and captured de Grasse with his flagship Ville de Paris at the Battle of the Saintes. De Grasse was widely criticised for his defeat in the battle. On his return to France in 1784, he blamed his captains for the defeat. A court-martial exonerated all of his captains, effectively ending his naval career.

== Early life ==
François-Joseph de Grasse was born and raised at Bar-sur-Loup in south-eastern France, the last child of Francois de Grasse Rouville, Marquis de Grasse. He earned his title and supported his Provençal family.

== Marriage and family ==
De Grasse married Antoinette Rosalie Accaron in 1764, and they had six children who survived to adulthood, among them his eldest son Alexandre Francois Auguste de Grasse. Auguste had a career in the French army and inherited his father's title as count in 1788. His younger brother Maxime died young in 1773. They had four sisters: Amélie Rosalie Maxime, Adélaide, Melanie Veronique Maxime, and Silvie de Grasse. Silvie married M. Francis de Pau in Charleston, South Carolina, and raised a family with him in New York City.

After his wife Antoinette died young, de Grasse married again, to Catherine Pien, widow of M. de Villeneuve. She also died before him. Thirdly, he married Marie Delphine Lazare de Cibon.

In addition, while in service in India during and after the Seven Years' War, de Grasse is believed to have fathered a mixed-race, French-Indian boy with an Indian woman in Calcutta. The boy, born about 1780, was known as Azar Le Guen. De Grasse brought the boy back to Paris with him for his education and formally adopted him, naming him George de Grasse. After his father's death, the young man went to the United States by 1799, where he settled in New York City. He worked for a time for Aaron Burr, likely meeting him through a connection of his father's. Burr gave him two lots of land in Manhattan, and George de Grasse became a naturalized citizen in 1804.

George de Grasse married well and educated his three children: his son John van Salee de Grasse was the first African American to graduate from medical school and became a respected physician in Boston; he served as a surgeon in the Union Army during the American Civil War. The eldest son, Isaiah George DeGrasse, became a Protestant Episcopal minister, and daughter Serena married George Downing, who became a renowned restaurant entrepreneur and civil rights activist.

== Naval career ==
In 1734, de Grasse became a page of grand master of the Knights Hospitaller, António Manoel de Vilhena. He subsequently joined the navy of the Order of Saint John, serving as an ensign on the navy's galleys in battles against the Ottoman Navy and Barbary corsairs. In 1740 at the age of 17, he formally entered the French Navy.

He participated in French naval action in India during the Seven Years' War. He was intermittently stationed in Calcutta (now Kolkata), India, from the 1760s to 1781.

Following Britain's victory over the French in the Seven Years' War, de Grasse helped rebuild the French navy in the years after the Treaty of Paris (1763).

== American War of Independence ==
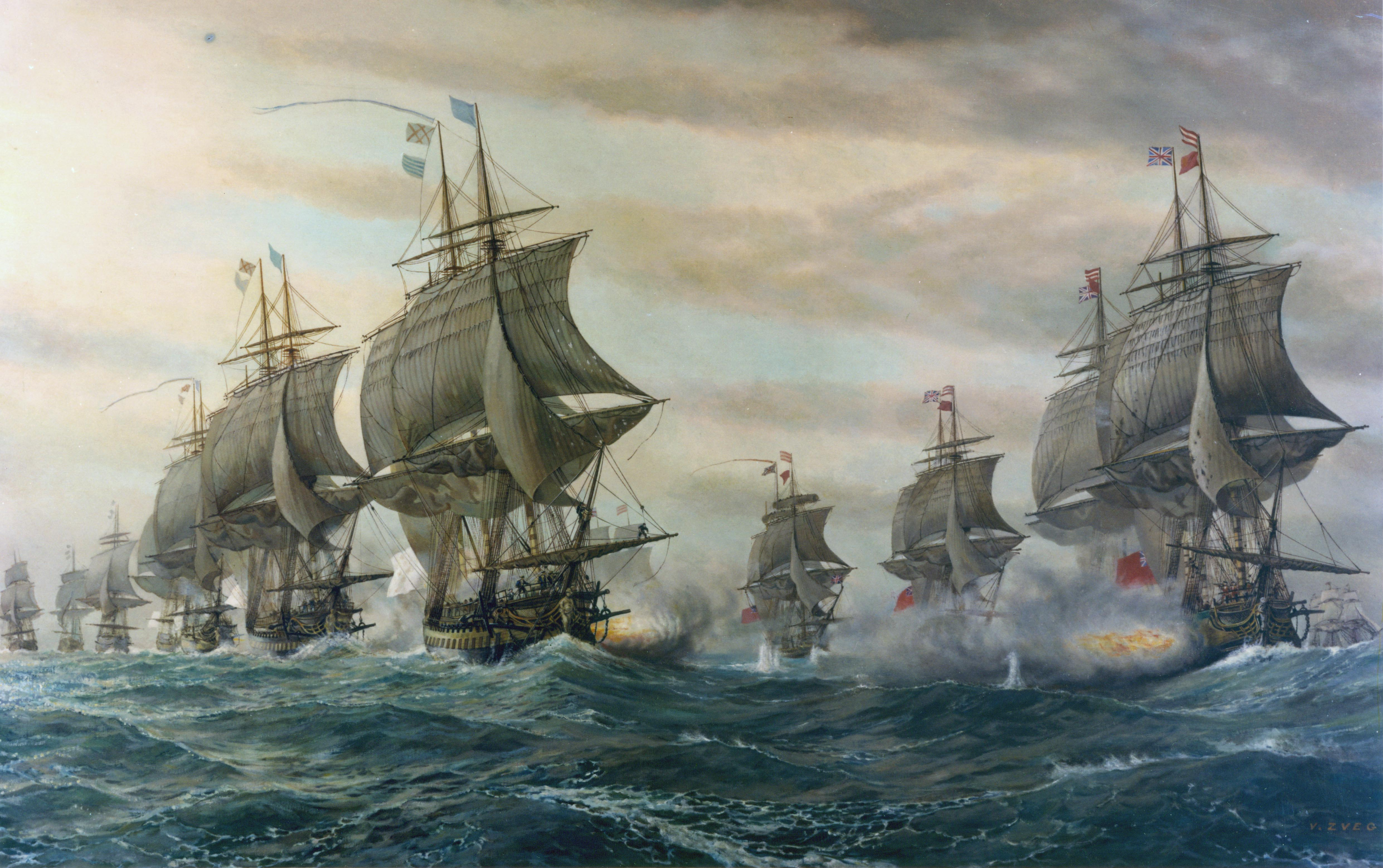
The Battle of the Chesapeake (1781), painting by V. Zveg from the collections of the Hampton Roads Naval Museum, Virginia, U.S.

In 1775, the American War of Independence broke out when American colonists rebelled against British rule. France supplied the colonists with covert aid, but remained officially neutral until 1778. The Treaty of Alliance established the Franco-American alliance, and France entered the war on behalf of the rebels and against Great Britain.

As a commander of a division, Comte de Grasse served under Louis Guillouet, comte d'Orvilliers at the First Battle of Ushant from July 23 to 27, 1778. The battle, fought off Brittany, was indecisive.

In 1779, he joined the fleet of Charles Henri Hector d'Estaing in the West Indies as commander of a squadron; they were operating to counter the Royal Navy of Britain. He contributed to the capture of Grenada that year, and took part in the three actions fought by Luc Urbain de Bouexic, comte de Guichen against Admiral of the White Sir George Rodney in the Battle of Martinique. De Grasse was promoted to lieutenant-general of the Navy (equivalent to vice-admiral) in March 1781, and was successful in defeating Admiral Samuel Hood and taking Tobago.

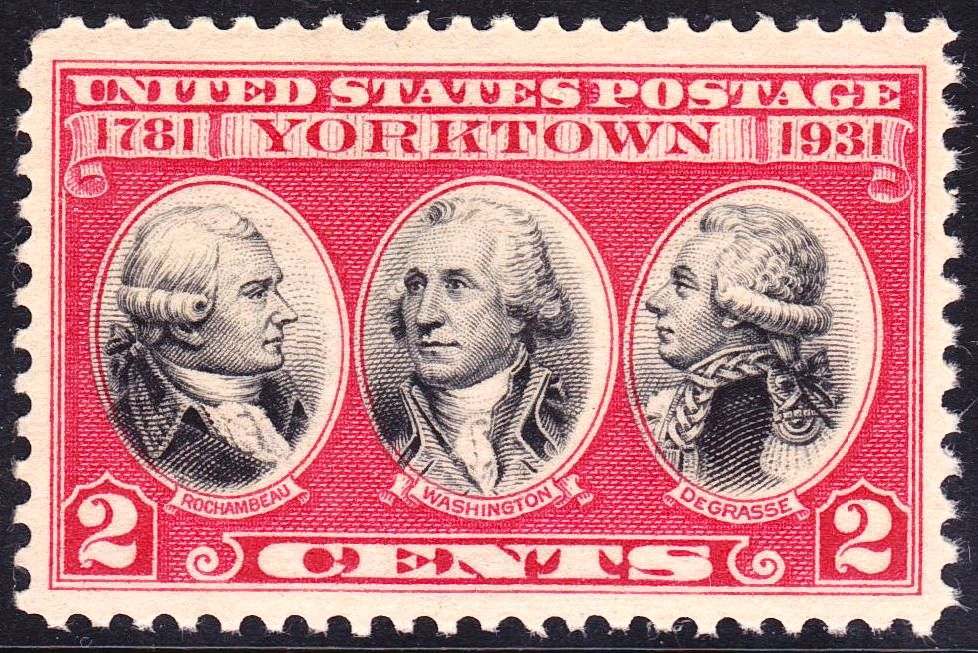
U.S. postage stamp, 1931 issue, honoring Comte de Rochambeau, George Washington, and de Grasse, commemorating the 150th anniversary of the victory at the siege of Yorktown, 1781.

=== Battle of the Chesapeake and Yorktown campaign ===
De Grasse responded to George Washington and Comte de Rochambeau's Expédition Particulière when they appealed for his aid in 1781, setting sail with 3,000 troops from Saint-Domingue, where the French Caribbean fleet was based. De Grasse landed the French reinforcements in Virginia. Immediately afterward he defeated a British fleet at the Battle of the Chesapeake in September 1781. He drew away the British forces and blockaded the coast until Lieutenant General Charles Cornwallis surrendered at Yorktown, ensuring the independence of the new United States of America.

=== Battle of the Saintes ===
De Grasse returned his fleet to the Caribbean. He was less fortunate in 1782 and was defeated at the Battle of Saint Kitts by Admiral Samuel Hood. Shortly afterward, in April 1782, de Grasse was again defeated, and taken prisoner by Rodney at the Battle of the Saintes. He initially sailed with the British fleet to Port Royal, Jamaica but after a period of only around one week was permitted to leave on the first convoy to England. Here he was landed on Southsea beach, allegedly to much applause. In August he was granted an audience with George III and was re-presented with his own sword, surrendered to Rodney at The Saintes.

He was taken to London for a time. While there, he briefly took part in the negotiations that laid the foundations for the Peace of Paris (1783), which brought the American Revolutionary War to an end. It also realigned control of some of the Caribbean islands.

De Grasse was released to return to France, where he was strongly criticized for his defeat in the Caribbean. He published a Mémoire justificatif and demanded a court-martial. An inquiry into the events of the battle started in 1783, ending in 1784 in acquittal for most of the officers involved, including de Grasse.

== Later life ==
De Grasse was a Commander of the Order of St. Louis and a Knight of the Order of St. John of Jerusalem. He was also a member of the American Society of the Cincinnati. De Grasse died at Tilly (Yvelines) in 1788; his tomb is in the church of Saint-Roch in Paris.

== Family trials ==
His grown children from his marriages all emigrated to Saint-Domingue. His eldest son, Auguste de Grasse, inherited the title of Comte de Grasse-Tilly. He was stationed in Saint-Domingue in 1789 as a naval officer, and acquired a large plantation and 200 slaves. He was joined by his stepmother and sisters.

After the Royal Navy defeated the French fleet there in 1793, during the Haitian Revolution, Auguste de Grasse was among the officers who surrendered and were allowed to leave. He migrated with his family (including his four sisters, who had joined him) and settled for several years in Charleston, South Carolina. Two sisters died there of yellow fever in 1799. Silvie, the youngest, married and moved with her husband to New York City.

After returning to France in the early 1800s after Napoleon came to power, Auguste de Grasse resumed his military career, this time in the army.

In his later years, he wrote a memoir about his father and his own travels in the New World, published in 1840 as Notice biographique sur l'amiral comte de Grasse d'après les documents inédits.

== Memorials and honors ==
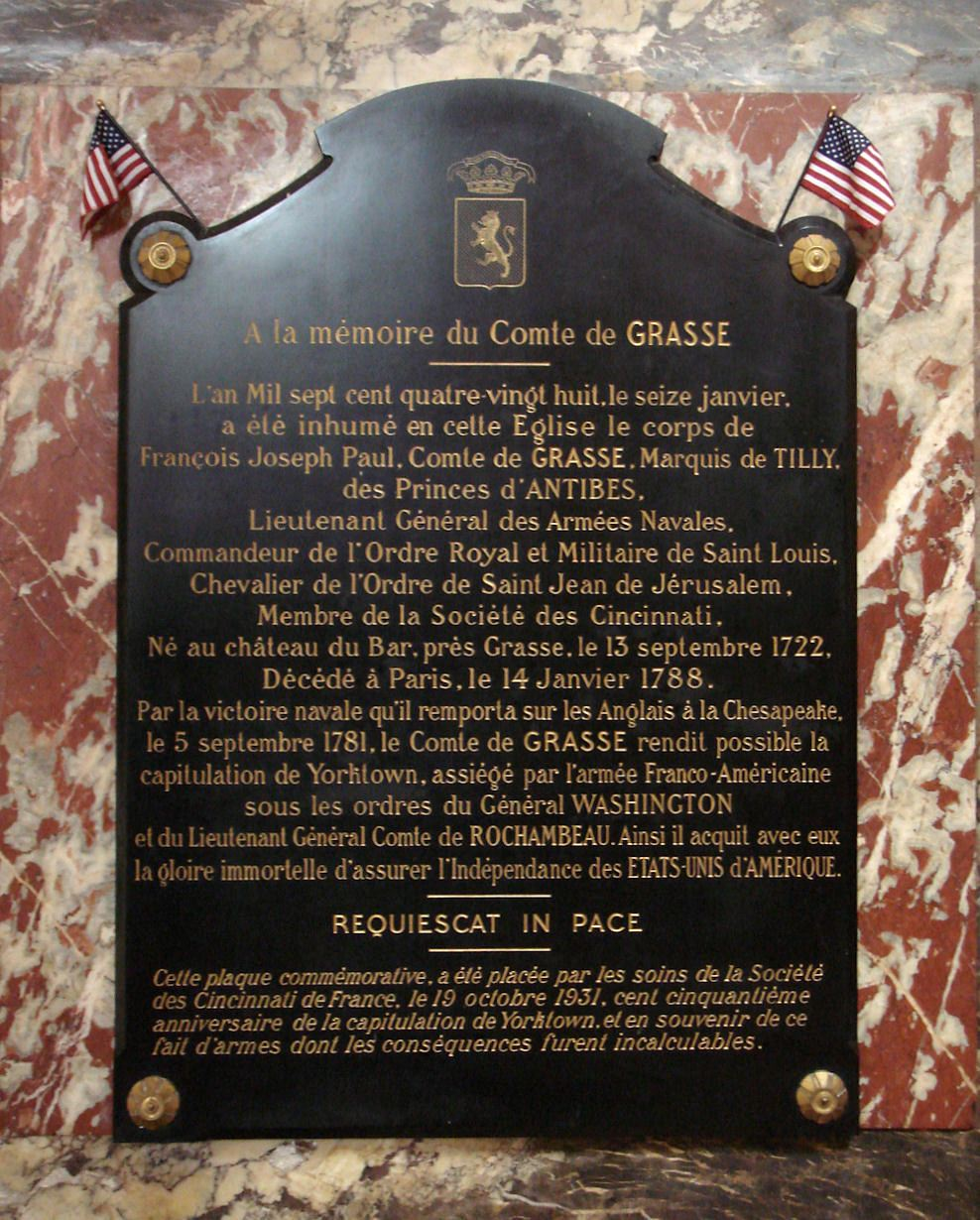
Tomb of de Grasse in the Church of Saint-Roch, Paris

- A monument was installed to commemorate de Grasse and his sailors at the Cape Henry Memorial, Joint Expeditionary Base East, Virginia Beach, Virginia. It is maintained by the Colonial National Historical Park of the National Park Service.
- A statue of de Grasse was installed at the riverwalk landing in Yorktown, Virginia.
- A statue of de Grasse is in the Place de la Tour of Le Bar-sur-Loup, the French village where he was born and grew up.
- Sometime between 1829 and 1839, Heman Allen, a former U.S. Representative and Ambassador to Chile, named the Grasse Mount estate in Burlington, Vermont after de Grasse.
- A. Kingsley Macomber, an American resident of France since the end of World War I, commissioned a monument of de Grasse in 1931 to be placed at the Trocadero Palace in Paris.
- The Grasse River, which flows through St. Lawrence County, New York, and the hamlet of Degrasse in the Town of Russell, New York, are named for him.
- De Grasse was the name of two medium-sized French Line passenger ships, one built in 1924 in Scotland, and the other formally the 1956-built Bergensfjord of Norwegian America Lines, which was introduced in 1971. The first ship was famous world-wide, serving the transatlantic route; it later was used by the Allies as a troop ship in World War II.

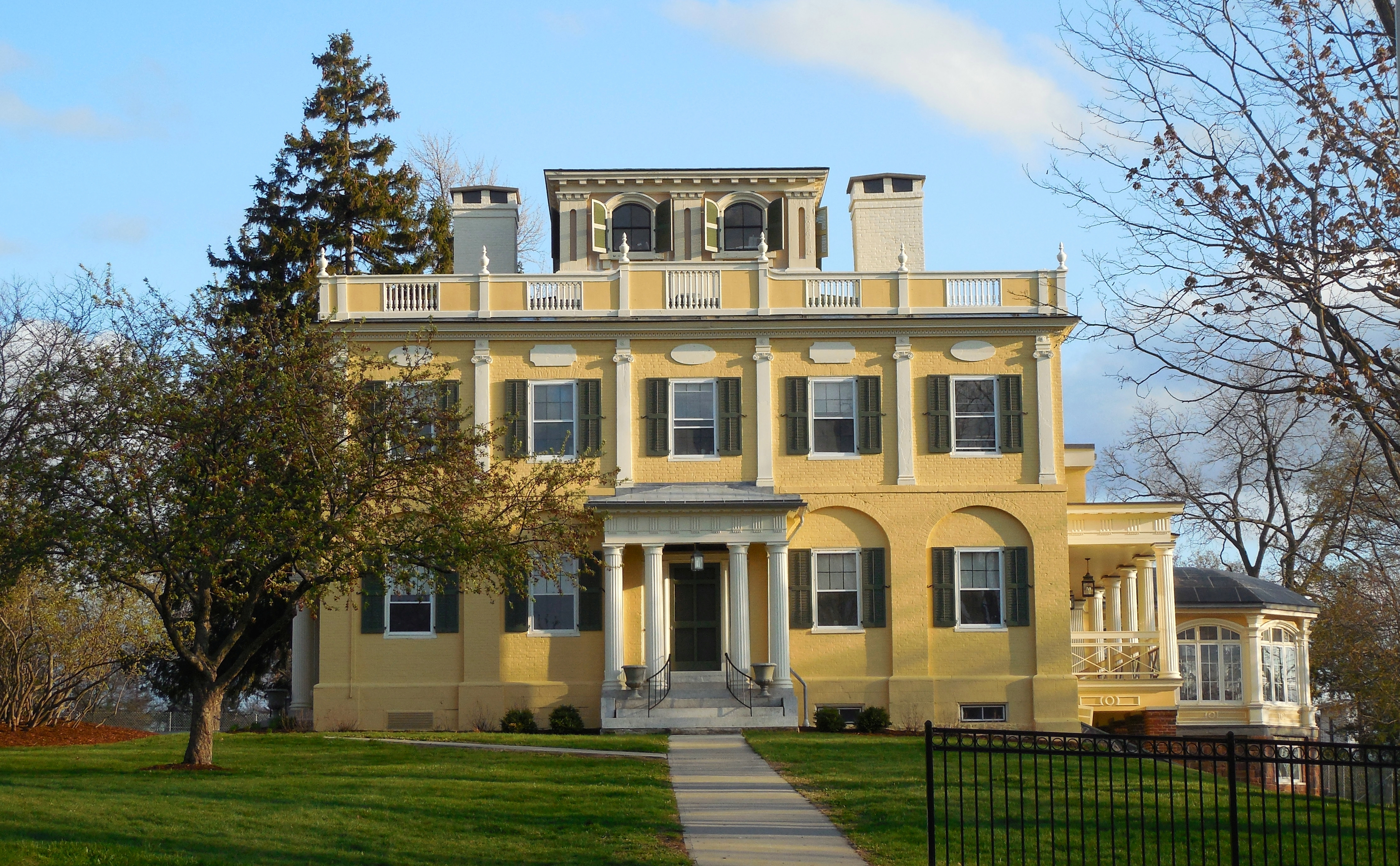
Grasse Mount in Burlington, Vermont, named for de Grasse

- The second De Grasse served the Le Havre–Southampton–West Indies service with little success, as ships were being replaced by the airlines. She was sold off in 1973.

=== Other vessel names ===
The French Navy has named two vessels in his honour:

- An anti-aircraft cruiser (in service from 1956 to 1973).
- A first-rank frigate of the F67 type.

The United States Navy has had three vessels named in his honour:

- USS Comte de Grasse (DD-974), a large multi-role destroyer of the Spruance class. (commissioned 1978, decommissioned 1998).
- USS De Grasse (AP-164/AK-223), a Crater-class cargo ship used during World War II (1943–1946).
- USS De Grasse (ID-1217), a patrol boat used in 1918.
