= ROCS Tso Ying =

Taiwanese guided-missile destroyer

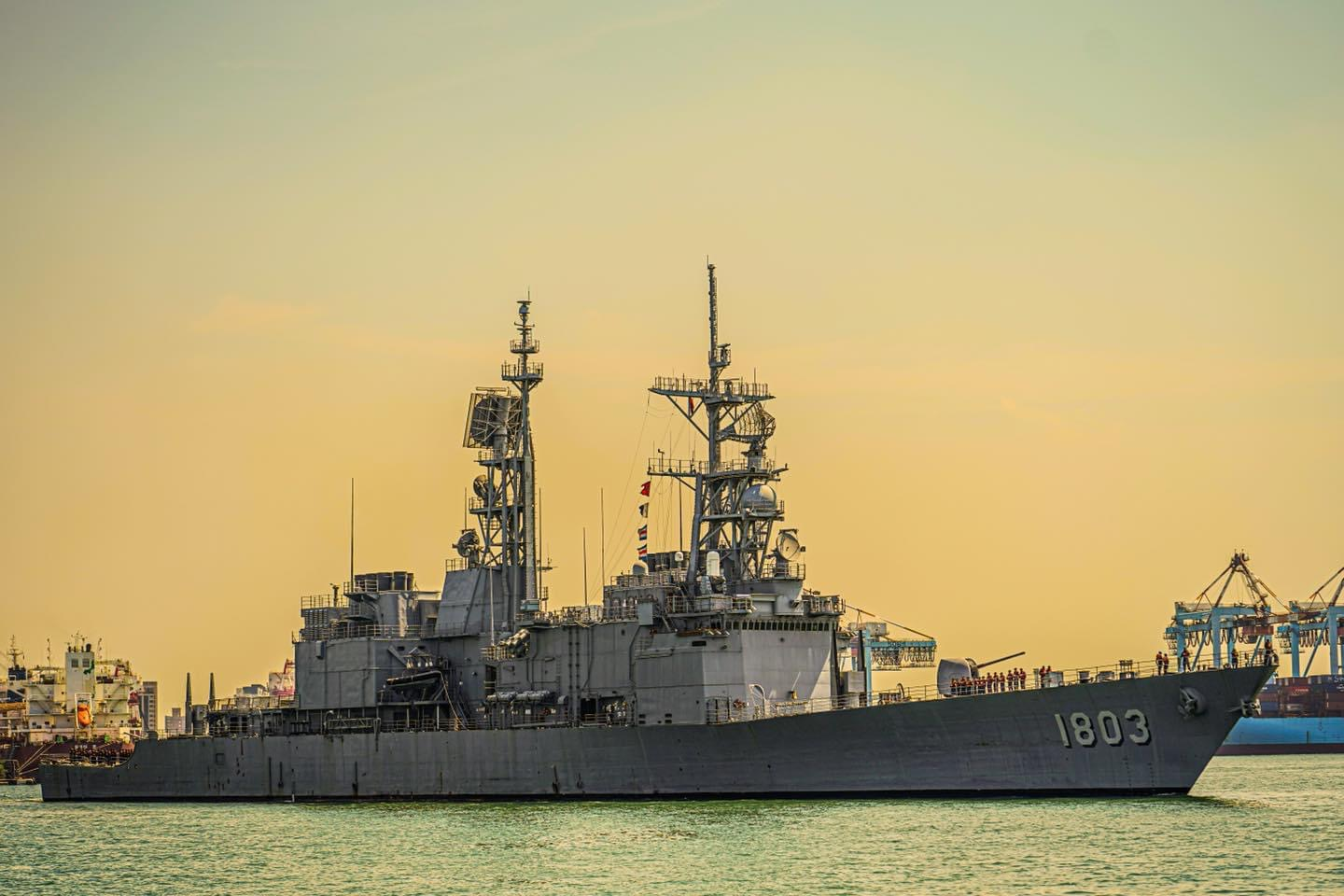
- ROCS Tso Ying

History

Taiwan
- Builder: Litton Ingalls, Pascagoula, Mississippi
- Laid down: 26 June 1978
- Launched: 11 August 1979 as USS Kidd (DDG-993)
- Acquired: 30 May 2003
- Name: ROCS Tso Ying (DDG-1803)
- Namesake: Tso Ying Naval Base, Tsoying, Kaohsiung City
- Commissioned: 3 November 2006
- Status: in active service

General characteristics
- Class & type: Kee Lung-class destroyer
- Displacement: Light: 6,950 t (6,840 long tons; 7,660 short tons); Full: 9,574 t (9,423 long tons; 10,554 short tons); Dead Weight: 2,624 t (2,583 long tons; 2,892 short tons)
- Length: 171.6 m (563 ft)
- Beam: 16.8 m (55 ft)
- Draft: 10.1 m (33.1 ft)
- Propulsion: 4 × General Electric LM2500-30 gas turbines, 80,000 shp total (60 MW)
- Speed: 33 knots (61 km/h)
- Sensors & processing systems: SPS-48E air search radar; SPS-49(V)5 air search radar; SPG-60 gun fire control radar; SPS-55 surface search radar; 2 × SPG-51D Missile Control Radar; SPQ-9A gun fire control radar; SPS-64 Navigation Radar; SQS-53 hull-mounted sonar
- Electronic warfare & decoys: AN/SLQ-32(V)3 OUTBOARD II EW Suite; Mark 36 SRBOC; AN/SLQ-25 Nixie towed sonar decoy
- Armament: 2 × Mark 26 launchers with; 68 × SM-2 Block IIIA SAM; 1 × Mark 141 quad launcher with; 4 × RGM-84 Harpoon; 2 × Mark 45 5 in (127 mm) gun; 2 × Mark 15 20 mm Phalanx CIWS; 4 × 12.7mm MGs; 2 × Mark 32 triple tube mounts with; 6 × Mark 46 torpedoes
- Aircraft carried: 1 Sikorsky S-70C(M) helicopter

ROCS Tso Ying (DDG-1803; Chinese: 左營號; Wade–Giles: Tso^{3} Ying^{2} Hao^{2}) is a Kee Lung-class guided-missile destroyer currently in active service of the Republic of China Navy (ROCN; Taiwan). It was formally commissioned at Suao Naval Base in northeastern Taiwan on 3 November 2006 along with sister ship ROCS Ma Kong (DDG-1805). Tso Ying is named after the largest naval base in Taiwan, the Tso Ying Naval Base in Tsoying District, Kaohsiung City in southern Taiwan. The Tso Ying Naval Base is also the location of the Taiwanese naval academy and fleet headquarters.

Tso Ying, formerly USS Kidd (DDG-993), the lead ship of her class of destroyers for the United States Navy, was purchased by the Taiwanese government in 2004. Her new name in ROCN service was originally planned to be Chi The, which is a transliteration of "Kidd" into Chinese.

== Ship History ==
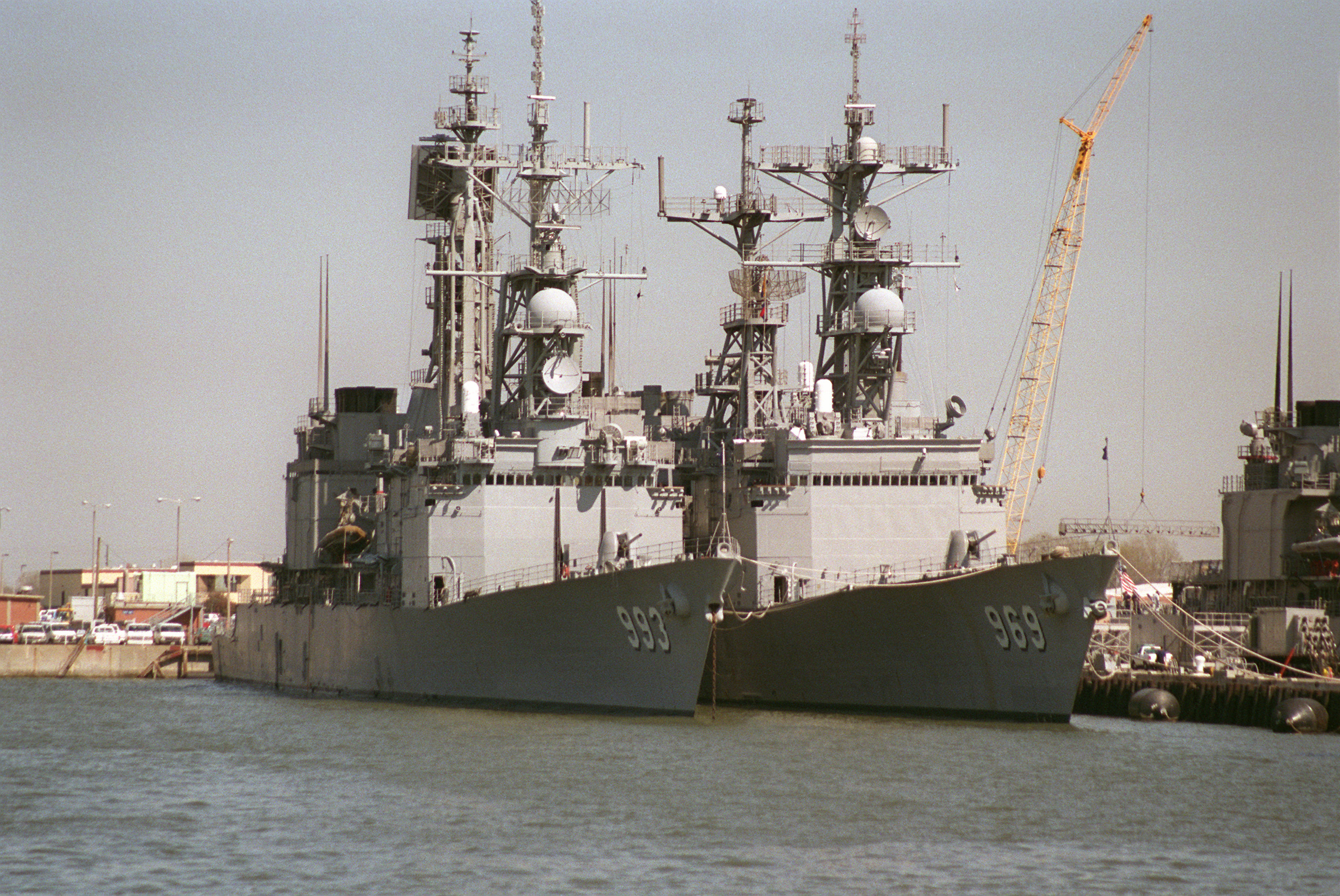
The predecessor of Zuoying - the U.S. Navy's Kidd (left) and the Spruance-class Peterson (USS Peterson DD-969) are moored together at the north side of the Norfolk Naval Base pier. Since the Kidd class is an improved ship of the Spruance class, the two classes of ships have very similar appearances, and the only way to identify their class is by whether they have MK-26 double-arm missile launchers.

The Zuoying, which was commissioned on November 1, 2006, was originally the Kouroush that the United States was going to sell to the Iranian Navy. However, due to the deterioration of relations between the United States and Iran after the Iranian Revolution, the new ship was taken over by the United States Navy after its completion. It was originally the first Kidd-class destroyer in service in 1981, the USS Kidd (DDG-993). The Kidd served in the US Navy until 1998 when it was decommissioned and sealed. In 2001, the Republic of China Navy established the "Guanghua VII Project" and purchased four Kidd-class destroyers from the United States. Among them, the Zuoying, originally named Kidd, was originally the first ship of the Kidd class, but because it was delivered to Taiwan later, it became the third ship of the Keelung class (the first ship Keelung was originally the third ship of the Kidd class USS Scott).

From August 6 to 9, 2022, the ship closely monitored the PLA's Nanjing conducting joint military exercises off the eastern coast of Taiwan.

On March 19, 2025, the Ministry of National Defense released photos of Japanese warships monitoring the PLA's 052C Changchun on the 18th of the same month.
