= ROCS Kee Lung =

Taiwanese guided missile destroyer

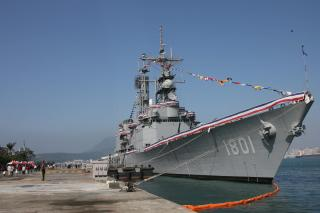
- Kee Lung in 2007

History

Taiwan
- Builder: Litton Ingalls, Pascagoula, Mississippi
- Laid down: 12 February 1979
- Launched: 1 March 1980 as USS Scott (DDG-995)
- Acquired: 30 May 2003
- Name: ROCS Kee Lung (DDG-1801)
- Namesake: Keelung
- Commissioned: 17 December 2005
- Status: in active service

General characteristics
- Class & type: Kee Lung-class destroyer
- Displacement: Light: 6,950 t (6,840 long tons; 7,660 short tons); Full: 9,574 t (9,423 long tons; 10,554 short tons); Dead Weight: 2,624 t (2,583 long tons; 2,892 short tons)
- Length: 171.6 m (563 ft)
- Beam: 16.8 m (55 ft)
- Draft: 10.1 m (33.1 ft)
- Propulsion: 4 × General Electric LM2500-30 gas turbines, 80,000 shp total (60 MW)
- Speed: 33 knots (61 km/h)
- Sensors & processing systems: SPS-48E air search radar; SPS-49(V)5 air search radar; SPG-60 gun fire control radar; SPS-55 surface search radar; 2 × SPG-51D Missile Control Radar; SPQ-9A gun fire control radar; SPS-64 Navigation Radar; SQS-53 hull-mounted sonar
- Electronic warfare & decoys: AN/SLQ-32(V)3 OUTBOARD II EW Suite; Mark 36 SRBOC; AN/SLQ-25 Nixie towed sonar decoy
- Armament: 2 × Mark 26 launchers with; 68 × SM-2 Block IIIA SAM; 1 × Mark 141 quad launcher with; 4 × RGM-84 Harpoon; 2 × Mark 45 5 in (127 mm) gun; 2 × Mark 15 20 mm Phalanx CIWS; 4 × 12.7mm MGs; 2 × Mark 32 triple tube mounts with; 6 × Mark 46 torpedoes
- Aircraft carried: 2 × Sikorsky S-70C(M)1/2 Seahawk

ROCS Kee Lung (基隆; DDG-1801) is the lead ship of her class of guided-missile destroyers currently in active service of Republic of China Navy.

== History ==
While Kee Lung is the lead ship of her class, she was actually not the first ship in her class built. Kee Lung was formerly the American Kidd-class destroyer USS Scott (DDG-995), which was decommissioned by the United States Navy in 1998. Scott was sold to the Republic of China Navy along with the other three Kidd-class destroyers in 2001. Scott was then renamed to Kee Long was the first of the four ships to be commissioned in the Republic of China Navy which made her the lead ship in the Republic of China Navy. Ironically, the USS Kidd (DDG-993), which was the original lead ship of the class, was also sold to the Republic of China Navy in 2006 and was renamed ROCS Tso Ying (DDG-1803). For a period of time Kee Lung was tentatively named Chi Teh (紀德), a transliteration of Kidd into Chinese. But it was later decided to name her after the port of Keelung, a major naval port in northern Taiwan.

Kee Lung, along with her three sister ships, is the largest destroyer and second largest ship in displacement ever in Republic of China Navy service, only smaller than ROCS Hsu Hai (LSD-193), a dock landing ship. Kee Lung was re-fitted for service in the ROCN at Detyen's Shipyard in North Charleston, South Carolina. She was formally commissioned on 17 December 2005 along with sister ship ROCS Su Ao (DDG-1802).

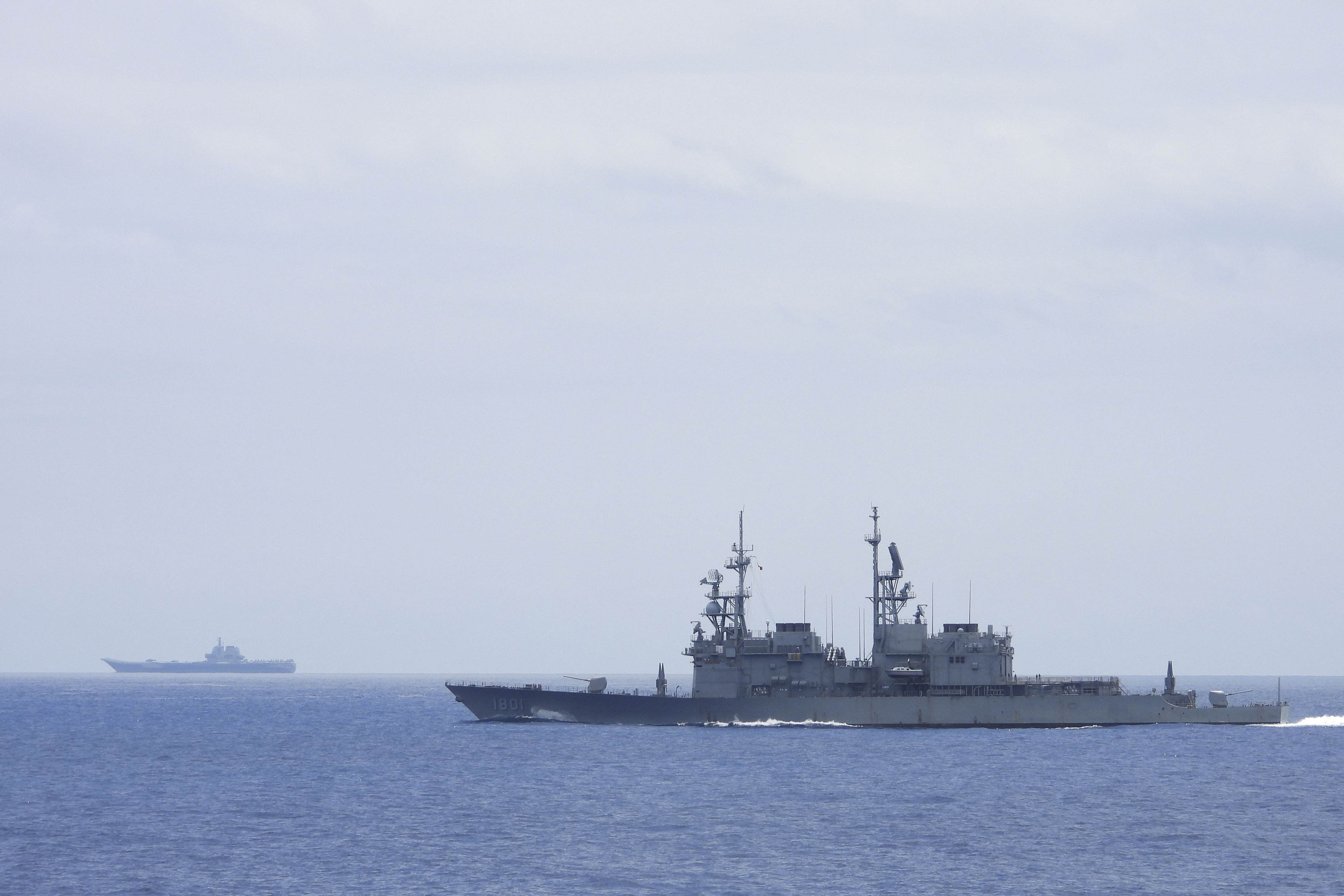
ROCS Keelung (DDG-1801) shadows PLANS Shandong (CV-17) in the Philippine Sea.

In May 2022, during the Han Kuang Exercise "Joint Intercept Operation Live-Fire Exercise", President Tsai Ing-wen specially boarded the Keelung ship to go out to sea to supervise the "actual combat" exercises from emergency port departure, anti-mine warfare, fleet air defense, joint sea and air anti-submarine warfare, anti-surface warfare and air control operations, and combined the three armed forces and the coast guard to use firepower to block the enemy's invasion.

On September 13, 2023, the Ministry of National Defense released footage of the ship monitoring the Chinese aircraft carrier Shandong.

On May 23, 2024, the ship monitored the PLA's 052C Xi'an conducting the "Joint Sword 2024A" exercise.

== Specifications ==
Kee Lung is the only one of her sister ships to be equipped with LAMPS III system and flight deck strengthened. This enables Kee Lung to carry up to two of the more capable Sikorsky S-70(M)-1/2 Seahawk helicopters for anti-submarine warfare, compared to her sister ships.
