= USS Callaghan =

Two ships of the United States Navy have borne the name Callaghan, in honor of Rear Admiral Daniel J. Callaghan.

- USS Callaghan (DD-792), was a Fletcher-class destroyer, launched in 1943 and sunk during the Battle of Okinawa in 1945.
- USS Callaghan (DDG-994), was a Kidd-class guided missile destroyer, launched in 1979 and struck in 1998.
