= USS Chandler (DDG-996) =

1980 American guided-missile destroyer

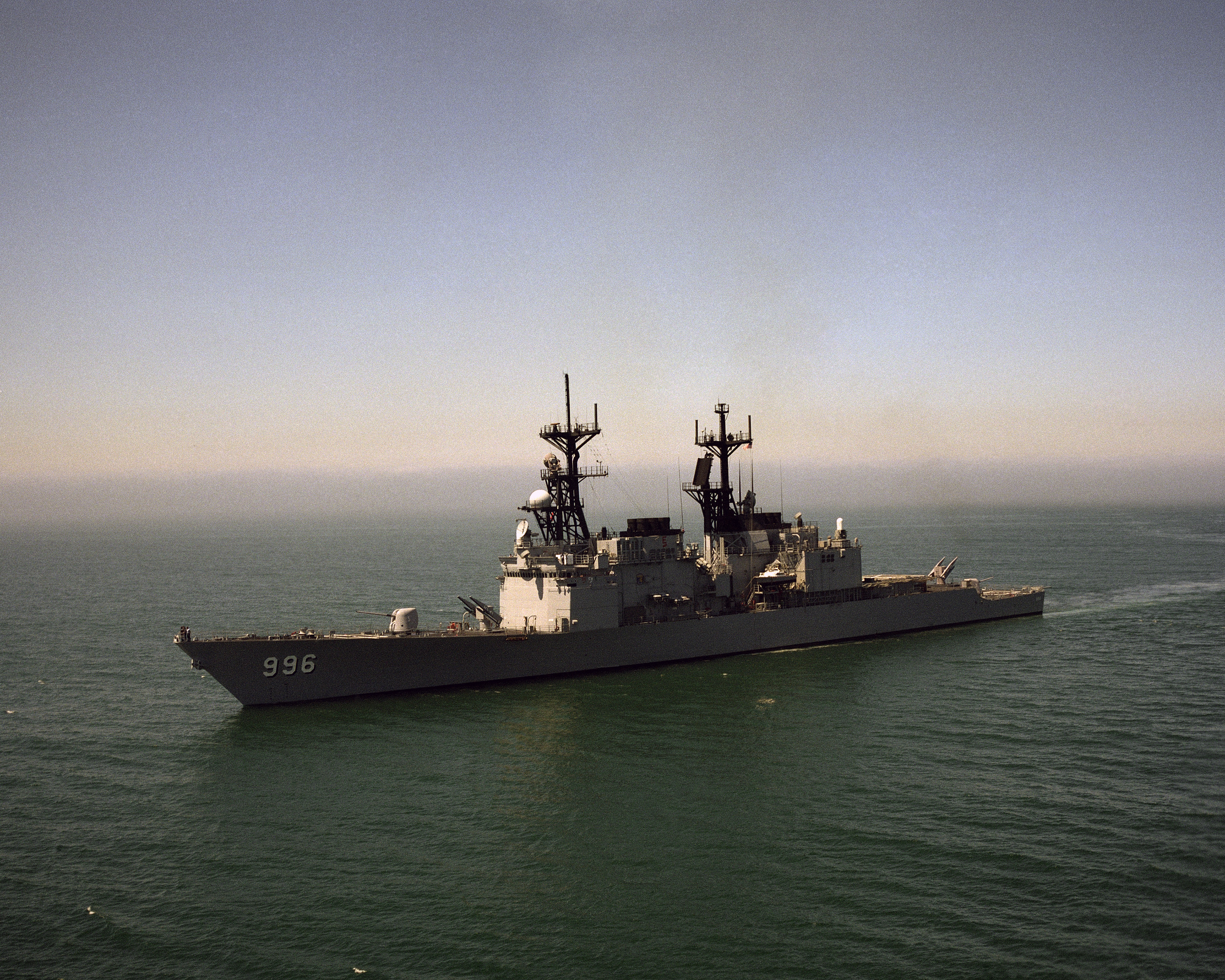
- USS Chandler on 1 June 1988

History

United States
- Namesake: Theodore E. Chandler
- Ordered: 23 March 1978
- Builder: Ingalls Shipbuilding
- Laid down: 7 May 1979
- Launched: 28 June 1980
- Commissioned: 13 March 1982
- Decommissioned: 23 September 1999
- Stricken: 23 September 1999
- Identification: Callsign: NPES; Hull number: DDG-996
- Fate: Sold to Taiwan, 30 May 2003; commissioned as ROCS Ma Kong (DDG-1805)

General characteristics
- Class & type: Kidd-class destroyer
- Displacement: 9,783 tons full
- Length: 171.6 m (563 ft)
- Beam: 16.8 m (55 ft)
- Propulsion: 4 × General Electric LM2500-30 gas turbines, 80,000 shp total
- Speed: 33 knots (61 km/h)
- Complement: 31 officers; 332 enlisted
- Sensors & processing systems: AN/SPS-48E 3D air search radar; AN/SPS-49 2D air search radar; SPG-60 gun fire control radar; AN/SPG-51 missile fire control radar; AN/SPS-55 surface search radar; AN/SPQ-9A gun fire control radar; SQS-53 sonar
- Electronic warfare & decoys: AN/SLQ-32(V)3
- Armament: 2 × Mark 26 RIM-66 Standard missile launchers; 2 × Mark 141 quad launcher with 8 × RGM-84 Harpoon; 2 × Mark 15 20 mm Phalanx CIWS; 2 × Mark 45 5 in (127 mm) / 54 caliber gun; 2 × Mark 32 triple tube mounts with 6 × Mark 46 torpedoes
- Aircraft carried: 1 × SH-3 Sea King or; 2 × SH-2 Seasprite

USS Chandler (DDG-996) was the final ship in the Kidd class of guided-missile destroyers operated by the U.S. Navy. Derived from the Spruance class, these vessels were designed for air defense in hot weather. She was named after Rear Admiral Theodore E. Chandler.

Originally named Andushirvan, the ship was originally ordered by the Imperial State of Iran, but was undelivered when the 1979 Iranian Revolution occurred. Subsequent to this, the U.S. Navy elected to commission her for service in the Persian Gulf and Mediterranean Sea, as she was equipped with heavy-duty air conditioning and was also well suited to filtering sand and the results from NBC warfare. She was commissioned in 1982.

Chandler was decommissioned in 1999. She was transferred to the Republic of China, renamed Wu Teh (DDG-1805) in 2004, and finally recommissioned as ROCS Ma Kong (DDG-1805) in 2006.

== Accident ==
In June 1985, Chandler was involved in an accident on the Columbia River. The ship itself was sued under Admiralty law in the United States by a barge owner who claimed that Chandler's negligent action on the Columbia River caused a dangerous swell called a soliton.

The District Court of Oregon heard the case and held that the officers on Chandler breached their duty to exercise reasonable care in avoiding creation of the dangerous swell and the plaintiff was able to recover for the damages.

== Awards ==
- Navy Meritorious Unit Commendation – (Nov 1987 - March 1988)
- Battle "E" – (1985–86, 1988–89, 1991–92, 1994, 1997)
- Humanitarian Service Medal – (12 December 1987) Rescue of oil tanker crew from Iran attack
- Southwest Asia Service Medal - (1991–92)
