= USS Scott (DDG-995) =

United States Navy (DDG-995)

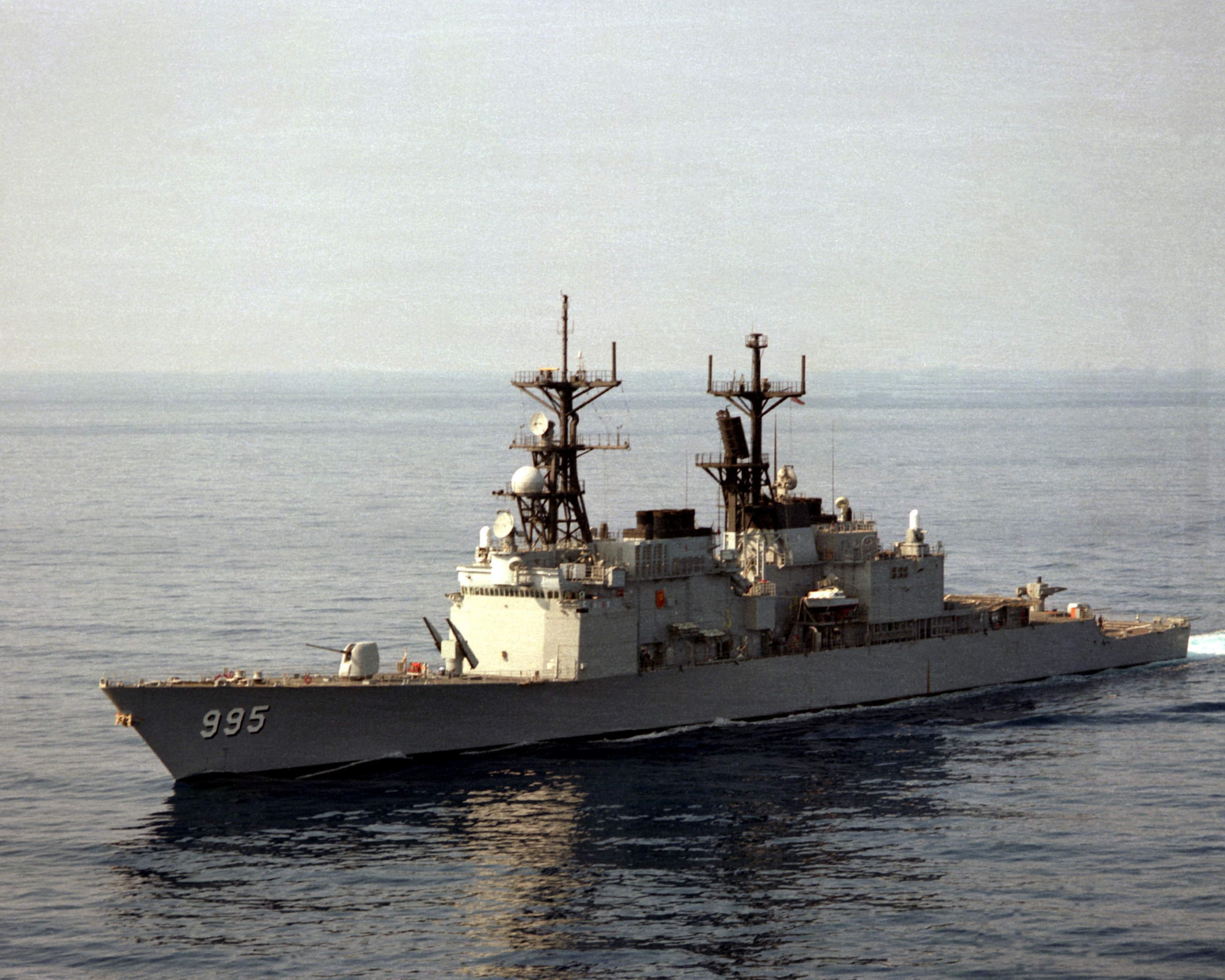
- USS Scott underway on 21 March 1986

History

United States
- Name: Scott
- Namesake: Norman Scott
- Builder: Ingalls Shipbuilding
- Laid down: 12 February 1979
- Launched: 1 March 1980
- Acquired: 8 September 1981
- Commissioned: 24 October 1981
- Decommissioned: 10 December 1998
- Stricken: 10 December 1998
- Identification: Callsign: NJSP; Hull number: DDG-995
- Fate: Sold to Taiwan, 30 May 2003; commissioned as ROCS Kee Lung (DDG-1801)
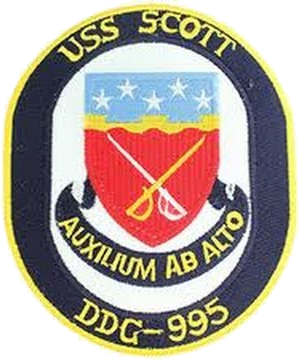
- Badge

General characteristics
- Class & type: Kidd-class destroyer
- Displacement: 9,783 tons full
- Length: 171.6 m (563 ft)
- Beam: 16.8 m (55 ft)
- Draft: 9.6 m (31.5 ft)
- Installed power: 80,000 shp (60,000 kW)
- Propulsion: 4 × General Electric LM2500-30 gas turbines
- Speed: 33 knots (61 km/h)
- Complement: 31 officers; 332 enlisted
- Sensors & processing systems: AN/SPS-48E 3D air search radar; AN/SPS-49 2D air search radar; SPG-60 gun fire control radar; AN/SPG-51 missile fire control radar; AN/SPS-55 surface search radar; AN/SPQ-9A gun fire control radar; SQS-53 sonar; AN/SQR-17A Sonar Signal Processing System sonar
- Electronic warfare & decoys: AN/SLQ-32(V)3
- Armament: 2 × Mark 26 RIM-66 Standard missile launchers; 2 × Mark 141 quad launcher with 8 × RGM-84 Harpoon; 2 × Mark 15 20 mm Phalanx CIWS; 2 × Mark 45 5 in (127 mm) / 54 caliber gun; 2 × Mark 32 triple tube mounts with 6 × Mark 46 torpedoes; MK 116 Mod 2 UBFCS
- Aircraft carried: 1 × SH-3 Sea King or; 2 × SH-2 Seasprite

USS Scott (DDG-995) was a Kidd-class destroyer of the United States Navy. She was named for Rear Admiral Norman Scott, who was killed during a surface action at the First Naval Battle of Guadalcanal (sometimes referred to as the Battle of Friday the 13th) aboard USS Atlanta, receiving a posthumous Medal of Honor for his actions.

Originally named Nader, Scott was ordered by the Imperial State of Iran, but was undelivered at the time of the Iranian Revolution and the U.S. Navy elected to commission her and her sister ships for service in the Persian Gulf. The destroyers were equipped with heavy-duty air conditioning and were also well suited to filtering sand and the results from NBC warfare. She was commissioned in 1981.

Scott completed a major re-fit in Philadelphia in 1988 that focused on upgrading its radar and fire control tracking system.

Scott was decommissioned from the U.S. Navy on 10 December 1998.

== Current status ==
Scott was sold to the Republic of China in 2004, originally to be named Chi Te. However, due to her better storage condition than her sister ships, she became the first Kidd-class vessel to be commissioned by the Republic of China Navy (ROCN) and thus became ROCS Kee Lung (DDG-1801), the lead vessel of the new ROCN Kee Lung-class destroyers.

After almost two years of refit and training in the U.S., the Kee Lung was commissioned on 17 December 2005 at Keelung naval port in northern Taiwan. The ROCN paid just over $690 million for the four Kidd-class destroyers, giving it extensive anti-aircraft warfare (AAW) capabilities.
