= Isaac C. Kidd =

US Navy Rear Admiral, Medal of Honor recipient (1884–1941)

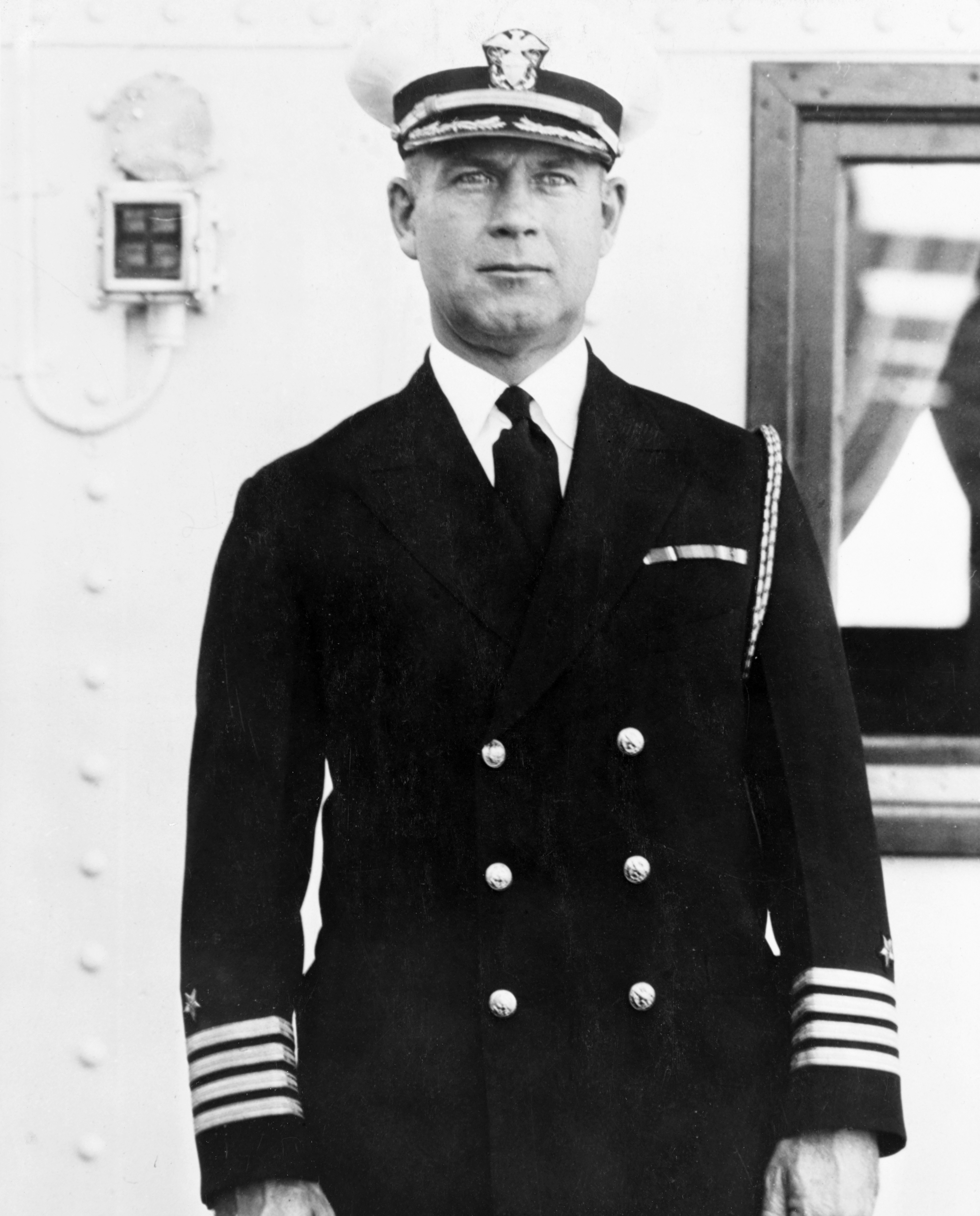
- Captain Isaac C. Kidd while he was chief of staff to the commander, Base Force, U.S. Fleet
- Born: March 26, 1884; Cleveland, Ohio, U.S.
- Died: December 7, 1941 (aged 57); Pearl Harbor, Territory of Hawaii
- Burial place: Hull of USS Arizona
- Relatives: Admiral Isaac C. Kidd Jr. (son)
- Military career
- Allegiance: United States
- Branch: United States Navy
- Service years: 1906–1941
- Rank: Rear admiral
- Commands: USS Vega (AK-17); Port of Cristóbal, Panama Canal Zone; Officer Detail Section, Bureau of Navigation; Destroyer Squadron 1 USS Arizona (BB-39); Battleship Division 1
- Conflicts: World War I; World War II; Attack on Pearl Harbor †
- Awards: Medal of Honor; Purple Heart

Isaac Campbell Kidd (March 26, 1884 – December 7, 1941) was a rear admiral in the United States Navy. He was the father of Admiral Isaac C. Kidd Jr. Kidd Sr. was killed on the bridge of USS Arizona during the Japanese attack on Pearl Harbor. The highest-ranking casualty at Pearl Harbor, he became the first U.S. Navy flag officer killed in action in World War II as well as the first killed in action against any foreign enemy.

He was a posthumous recipient of the nation's highest military honor—the Medal of Honor. A Fletcher-class destroyer, Kidd (DD-661), was commissioned in his honor on April 23, 1943. The second ship named after him, Kidd (DDG-993), lead ship of four Kidd-class destroyers, was commissioned on March 27, 1981. An Arleigh Burke-class guided missile destroyer, Kidd (DDG-100), was the third ship named after him and was commissioned on June 9, 2007.

== Early years and military service ==
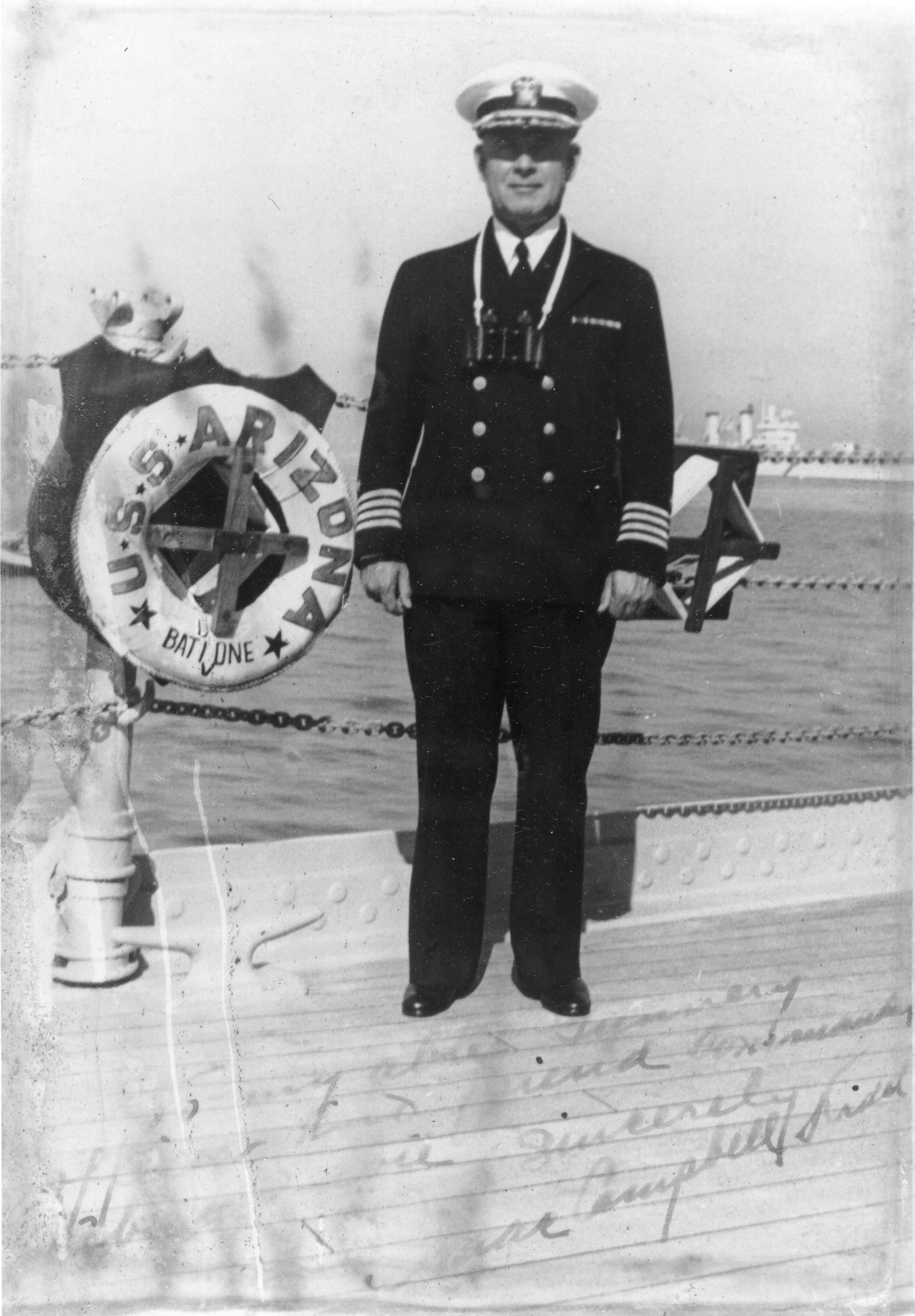
Kidd on the deck of Arizona, c. 1939

Kidd was born in Cleveland, Ohio, in 1884. He entered the U.S. Naval Academy in 1902, graduating with the Class of 1906 in February of that year. He was commissioned an ensign in 1908. Kidd participated in the 1907–1909 Great White Fleet cruise around the world while serving on the battleship New Jersey. Following service on the battleship North Dakota and armored cruiser Pennsylvania, Kidd became the Aide and Flag Secretary to the Commander in Chief, Pacific Fleet, the first of his many flagstaff assignments. He was an instructor at the U.S. Naval Academy in 1916–1917.

During and after World War I, Kidd was stationed on New Mexico, and then he had further staff and Naval Academy service. He was the executive officer of the battleship Utah in 1925–1926, then commanded the Navy transport Vega until becoming the captain of the port at Cristóbal, Panama Canal Zone from 1927 to 1930. Promoted to the rank of captain, he was the chief of staff to the commander, Base Force, United States Fleet in 1930–1932. After three years at the Bureau of Navigation in Washington, D.C., he was the commander of Destroyer Squadron One, Scouting Force, in 1935–1936, stationed in Long Beach, California. The Kidd family resided in a downtown Long Beach apartment building.

During the Japanese attack on Pearl Harbor on December 7, 1941, Rear Admiral Kidd was the commander of Battleship Division One and the chief of staff and aide to the commander, Battleship Battle Force. At his first knowledge of the attack, he rushed to the bridge of USS Arizona, his flagship, and "courageously discharged his duties as Senior Officer Present Afloat until Arizona blew up from a magazine explosion and a direct bomb hit on the bridge which resulted in the loss of his life."

Further research into the attack on Pearl Harbor indicates RADM Kidd was not the SOPA (Senior Officer Present Afloat) when the attack began. RADM William R. Furlong, commander Battle Forces Pacific was on board his flagship, the minelayer USS Oglala. RADM Furlong was senior by two years promoted on 23 Jun 1938. RADM Kidd was promoted in 1940.

Kidd's body was never recovered and to this day he is considered missing in action. It is likely that he is one of the 900 men who are entombed in the ship. U.S. Navy salvage divers located his Naval Academy ring fused to a bulkhead on Arizona's bridge. A trunk containing his personal memorabilia including his Naval Academy sword and belt were found in the wreck and sent to his widow with the restored ring. His widow gave the ring and the trunk and its contents, which included his ceremonial sword, sword belt and fore and aft cap to her son, Admiral Isaac C. Kidd, Jr. who completed his career as Commander of the Atlantic Fleet and Supreme Allied Commander of NATO Forces.

== Medal of Honor citation ==
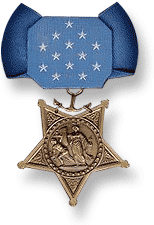

The President of the United States of America, authorized by an Act of Congress, March 4, 1942, has awarded, in the name of Congress, the Medal of Honor to

REAR ADMIRAL ISAAC CAMPBELL KIDD
UNITED STATES NAVY

For conspicuous devotion to duty, extraordinary courage, and complete disregard of his own life, during the attack on the fleet in Pearl Harbor, Territory of Hawaii, by Japanese Forces on December 7, 1941. Rear Adm. Kidd immediately went to the bridge and, as Commander Battleship Division One, courageously discharged his duties as senior officer present afloat until the USS Arizona, his flagship, blew up from magazine explosions and a direct bomb hit on the bridge, which resulted in the loss of his life.

== Awards and decorations ==
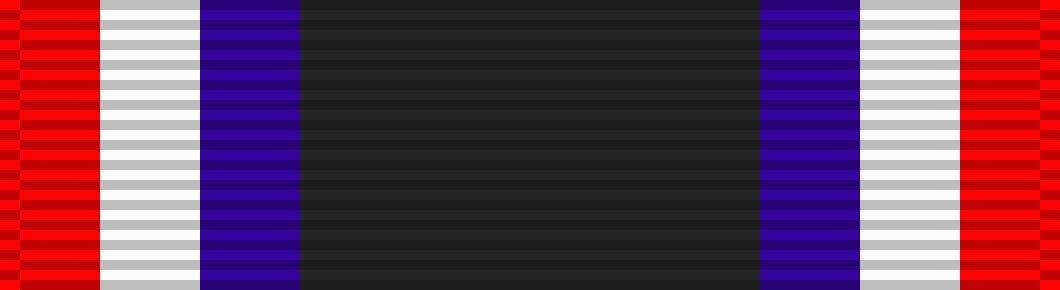

1st row	Medal of Honor		Purple Heart
2nd row	Cuban Pacification Medal	Mexican Service Medal	World War I Victory Medal with one campaign star
3rd row	American Defense Service Medal with 'Fleet Clasp'	American Campaign Medal	Asiatic-Pacific Campaign Medal with one campaign star
4th row	World War II Victory Medal	Navy Rifle Marksmanship Ribbon	Navy Pistol Marksmanship Ribbon

== Namesake and relations ==
- Three U.S. Navy destroyers have been named in Admiral Kidd's honor. See USS Kidd.
- Kidd's son, Admiral Isaac C. Kidd Jr., served in the US Navy from December 19, 1941, to 1978, eventually serving as Commander-in-Chief of the U.S. Atlantic Fleet.
- Kidd's grandson Isaac C. Kidd III retired with the rank of Navy Captain.
- Camp Kidd
- Admiral Kidd Park in West Long Beach, California, dedicated to Kidd by the Long Beach City Council on March 25, 1942

== See also ==
- List of Medal of Honor recipients for World War II
