= ROCS Su Ao =

Naval destroyer of the Navy of the Republic of China

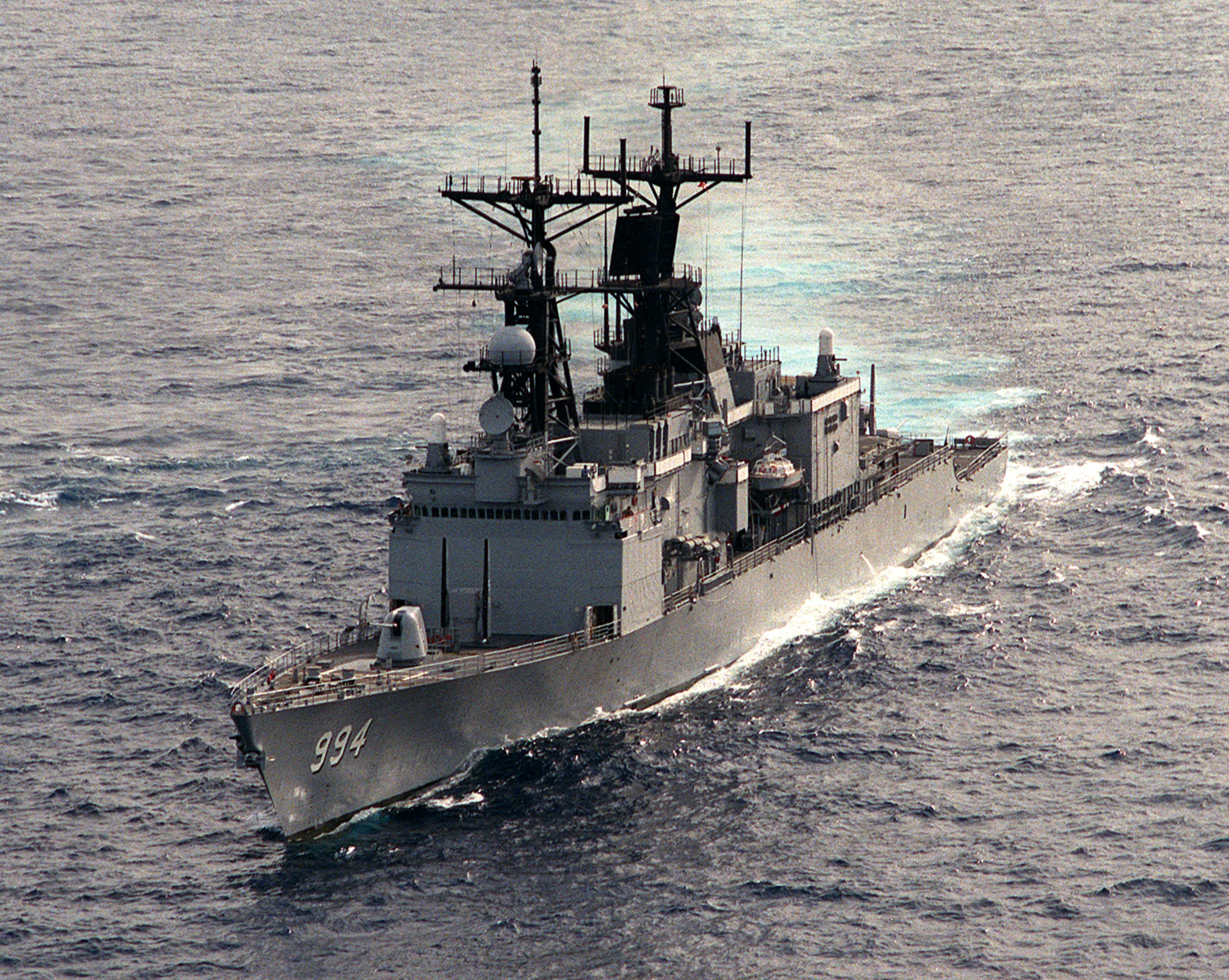
- ROCS Su Ao (DDG-1802), then USS Callaghan

History

Taiwan
- Builder: Litton Ingalls, Pascagoula, Mississippi
- Laid down: 23 October 1978
- Launched: 1 December 1979 as USS Callaghan (DDG-994)
- Acquired: 30 May 2003
- Name: ROCS Su Ao (DDG-1802)
- Namesake: Su-Ao Naval Base, Su-ao, Yilan
- Commissioned: 17 December 2005
- Status: in active service

General characteristics
- Class & type: Kee Lung-class destroyer
- Displacement: Light: 6,950 t (6,840 long tons; 7,660 short tons); Full: 9,574 t (9,423 long tons; 10,554 short tons); Dead Weight: 2,624 t (2,583 long tons; 2,892 short tons)
- Length: 171.6 m (563 ft)
- Beam: 16.8 m (55 ft)
- Draft: 10.1 m (33.1 ft)
- Propulsion: 4 × General Electric LM2500-30 gas turbines, 80,000 shp total (60 MW)
- Speed: 33 knots (61 km/h)
- Sensors & processing systems: SPS-48E air search radar; SPS-49(V)5 air search radar; SPG-60 gun fire control radar; SPS-55 surface search radar; 2 × SPG-51D Missile Control Radar; SPQ-9A gun fire control radar; SPS-64 Navigation Radar; SQS-53 hull-mounted sonar
- Electronic warfare & decoys: AN/SLQ-32(V)3 OUTBOARD II EW Suite; Mark 36 SRBOC; AN/SLQ-25 Nixie towed sonar decoy
- Armament: 2 × Mark 26 launchers with; 68 × SM-2 Block IIIA SAM; 1 × Mark 141 quad launcher with; 4 × RGM-84 Harpoon; 2 × Mark 45 5 in (127 mm) gun; 2 × Mark 15 20 mm Phalanx CIWS; 4 × 12.7mm MGs; 2 × Mark 32 triple tube mounts with; 6 × Mark 46 torpedoes
- Aircraft carried: 1 Sikorsky S-70C(M) helicopter

ROCS Su Ao (蘇澳; DDG-1802) is a Kee Lung-class destroyer guided-missile destroyer currently in active service of the Republic of China Navy. Su Ao was formerly American Kidd-class destroyer USS Callaghan (DDG-994), which was decommissioned from the United States Navy in 1998. For some time after the ship's 30 May 2003 purchase, Su Ao was tentatively named Ming Teh (明德), following the example of Chi Teh (紀德), but it was later decided to be named Su Ao, after the Su-Ao naval base in eastern Taiwan.

== Ship History ==
On August 20, 2019, American Institute in Taiwan (AIT) Director Bernard Li and others went to Zuoying to visit the AAV7 Amphibious Assault Vehicle and the Keelung-class Suao warship.

On February 26, 2025, this ship broadcast in the southwest waters of Taiwan to drive away the PLA Huanggang that was conducting illegal exercises.

On April 1, 2025, this ship formed a fleet with the Tian Dan and Ming Chuan to monitor the Shandong aircraft carrier formation located about 220 nautical miles southeast of Eluanbi.
