= USS Kidd (DDG-993) =

Destroyer ship in the US Navy

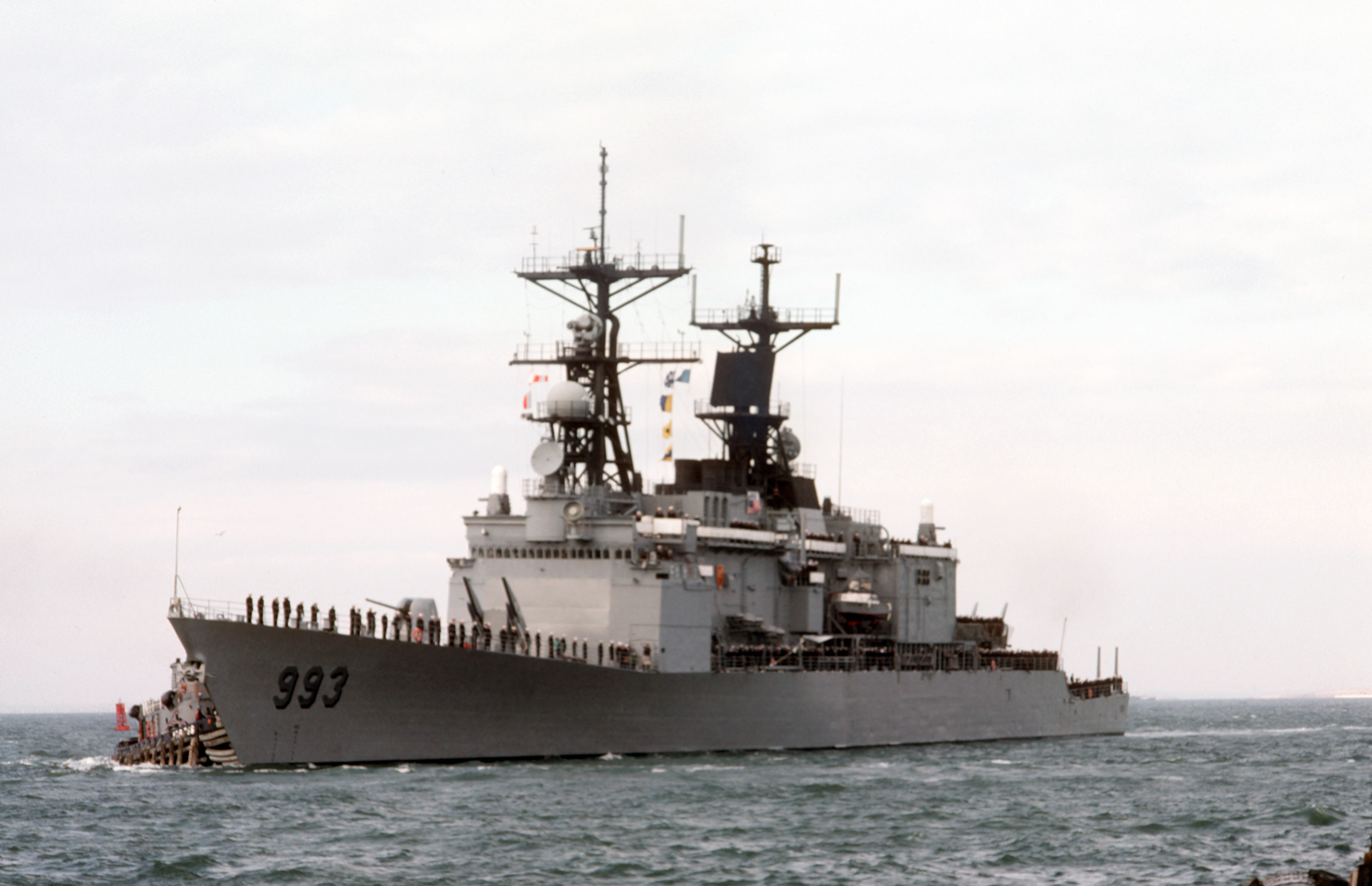
- USS Kidd off Norfolk in December 1987

History

United States
- Name: Kidd
- Namesake: Isaac C. Kidd
- Ordered: 23 March 1978
- Builder: Ingalls Shipbuilding
- Laid down: 26 June 1978
- Launched: 11 August 1979
- Acquired: 4 May 1981
- Commissioned: 27 March 1981
- Decommissioned: 12 March 1998
- Stricken: 12 March 1998
- Identification: Callsign: NKID; Hull number: DDG-993
- Motto: Nil Sine Magno Labore; (Nothing without hard work)
- Fate: Sold to the Taiwanese navy; currently active as ROCS Tso Ying
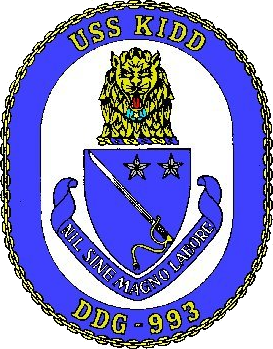
- Badge

General characteristics
- Class & type: Kidd-class destroyer
- Displacement: 9,783 tons full
- Length: 171.6 m (563 ft)
- Beam: 16.8 m (55 ft)
- Propulsion: 4 × General Electric LM2500-30 gas turbines, 80,000 shp total
- Speed: 33 kn (61 km/h; 38 mph)
- Complement: 31 officers; 332 enlisted
- Sensors & processing systems: AN/SPS-48E 3D air search radar; AN/SPS-49 2D air search radar; SPG-60 gun fire control radar; AN/SPG-51 missile fire control radar; AN/SPS-55 surface search radar; AN/SPQ-9A gun fire control radar; SQS-53 sonar
- Electronic warfare & decoys: AN/SLQ-32(V)3
- Armament: Two × twin Mk 26 missile launchers for the Standard Missile SM-2MR with magazines for 80 missiles; Two × Mark 141 quad launchers for eight RGM-84 Harpoon missiles; Two Mark 45 5 in (127 mm) – 54 calibre rapid-fire naval guns; Two × Mark 15 20 mm Phalanx CIWS self-defense cannon; Two Mark 32 triple tube mounts with 6 × Mark 46 torpedoes
- Aircraft carried: One SH-3 Sea King or; Two SH-2 Seasprite helicopters

USS Kidd (DDG-993) was the lead ship in her class of destroyers operated by the U.S. Navy. Derived from the Spruance-class, these vessels were designed for air defense in hot weather. The vessel was the second named after Medal of Honor recipient Rear Admiral Isaac C. Kidd, who was aboard USS Arizona during the attack on Pearl Harbor, and was the first American flag officer to die in World War II.

Originally named Kouroush, the ship was ordered by the Shah of Iran but was undelivered when the 1979 Iranian Revolution occurred. After this, the U.S. Navy elected to commission the Kidd-class for service in the Persian Gulf and the Mediterranean, as they were equipped with heavy-duty air conditioning and were also well suited to filtering sand, and the results from NBC warfare. Kidd-class ships were known in the fleet informally as the "Ayatollah" or "dead admiral" class.

== History ==
USS Kidd was commissioned on 27 June 1981 at Pascagoula, Mississippi.

On 8 December 1982, the destroyer deployed to the Mediterranean and the Indian Ocean under the command of Commander William J. Flanagan, Jr. While in the Mediterranean Sea, USS Kidd visited the ports of Palma, Majorca, Spain; Beirut, Lebanon; and Catania, Italy. She visited the ports of Trincomalee, Sri Lanka, and Mombasa, Kenya, while on station in the Indian Ocean before returning to the Mediterranean and calling on Benidorm, Spain. The deployment ended with her return to Norfolk on 2 June 1983. In September 1983, Kidd was awarded the Battle Efficiency "E".

On 16 February 1984, USS Kidd left Norfolk, Virginia, to participate in battle-readiness maneuvers as part of Operation United Effort. She returned home to Norfolk on 29 April.

Kidd participated in READEX 1–85 commencing 12 March 1985 with Commander Fred Moosally in command. She conducted Caribbean operations from 28 March to 6 April before anchoring at Roosevelt Roads, Puerto Rico. Following a transit of the Atlantic Ocean, she passed through the Straits of Gibraltar on 17 April. While in the Mediterranean, USS Kidd called on the ports of Taormina, Sicily, and Gaeta and Naples, Italy.

From 30 May 1985, Kidd took part in U.S. Sixth Fleet operations in the Black Sea through 3 June. USS Kidd cut short a port visit to Haifa, Israel, on 16 June in response to the TWA Flight 847 aircraft hijacking. She returned to Haifa on 15 July before visiting Alexandria, Egypt, and Constanța, Romania. Black Sea operations continued with the Sixth Fleet in August. Kidd called on Istanbul, Turkey, before returning to Naples, Italy. Through September, she conducted operations in the Western Mediterranean with USS Nimitz. Calling on Benidorm, Spain, she then passed through the Straits of Gibraltar again on 20 September. After visiting Rota, Spain, Kidd crossed the Atlantic under the power of her gas-turbine engines, arriving in Norfolk and ending her deployment on 2 October 1985.

In September 1987, under Commander Daniel Murphy, USS Kidd was awarded her third Battle Efficiency "E" award while deployed as part of the Middle East Force 3–87. She departed Norfolk on 6 June 1987, returning to port on 4 December 1987. During the Persian Gulf operations from 4 July to 2 October, Kidd led the first ten convoys of Kuwaiti tankers, reflagged with American flags. This reflagging was in response to Iranian threats to close the Persian Gulf shipping lanes, through which more than 50% of the world's oil output passes. During this deployment, Kidd also participated in Operation Nimble Archer in October.

On 9 January 1991 USS Kidd departed from Norfolk, bound for the Persian Gulf, along with USS McInerney, in support of Operation Desert Storm. Kidd faced several roles while operating in the Persian Gulf, among them the location and destruction of naval mines and maritime interdiction force operations. To assist in these duties, a detachment from Anti-Submarine Light Helicopter Squadron 34 (HSL-34) was embarked. The "Green Checkers" came aboard with two SH-2 helicopters which were used early on in SSSC missions – flying beyond the visual horizon of this warship to visually observe all radar contacts on the surface. In early April, two U.S. Army OH-58 AHIPS helicopters were embarked, giving a total of four helicopters embarked on board Kidd at one time.

In December 1991, USS Kidd was again awarded the Battle Efficiency "E" for excellence during Desert Shield and Desert Storm.

In October 1992, Kidd was deployed in counter-narcotics operations off the South American coast. USS Kidd transited the Panama Canal on 8 November 1992. During this mission, she patrolled Latin American waters as a deterrent to smugglers of illegal contraband. A detachment from the Anti-Submarine Light Helicopter Squadron 34 (HSL-34) was carried on this cruise. In December 1992, USS Kidd was awarded her sixth Battle Efficiency "E". Admiral Isaac Kidd, Jr., USN(Ret.), presented this award to the crew at a pierside ceremony.

USS Kidd was assigned to Carrier Task Force 60 (CTF-60) in October 1994, forming around USS Dwight D. Eisenhower. During this period, the task force provided support for the naval weapons and ammunition embargo of the war-torn republics of the former Yugoslavia ("Operation Sharpguard"), the enforced no-fly zone over the area (Operation Deny Flight), and air drops of humanitarian aid to the residents of the city of Sarajevo ("Operation Provide Promise").

On 16 April 1997, the destroyer began a three-day port visit to Boston, Massachusetts, to coincide with the 100th running of the Boston Marathon. From there, she moved southward to Port-au-Prince, Haiti, for a community relations project before assuming drug interdiction duties in the Caribbean. She transited the Panama Canal to the Eastern Pacific on 30 April. Following another transit of the Canal and a brief stop in Charleston, South Carolina, USS Kidd ended her final deployment in Norfolk on 1 June 1997.

USS Kidd was decommissioned for placement into storage as a reserve warship on 12 March 1998 at Norfolk Naval Base, Virginia. Present at this decommissioning ceremony were several of Admiral Isaac Kidd's surviving family members, including his son, Admiral Isaac C. Kidd, Jr., USN (Ret.). USS Kidd's last American commanding officer was Commander Thomas R. Andress, USN.

== Current status ==
The vessel has been renamed ROCS Tso Ying, a Kee Lung-class guided-missile destroyer currently in active service of Republic of China Navy. She was formally commissioned at the Su-ao Naval Base in northeastern Taiwan on 2006-11-03, along with her sister ship, ROCS Ma Kong. Due to her somewhat run-down condition from her storage, she was the third former Kidd-class vessel commissioned by ROCN.

Tso Ying is named after the largest naval base in Taiwan, the Tso Ying Naval Base in the Tsoying District, Kaohsiung, of southern Taiwan. The Tso Ying Naval Base is also the location of the Republic of China's naval academy and fleet headquarters.

== See also ==
- List of destroyers of the United States Navy
