= USS Callaghan (DDG-994) =

United States Navy destroyer

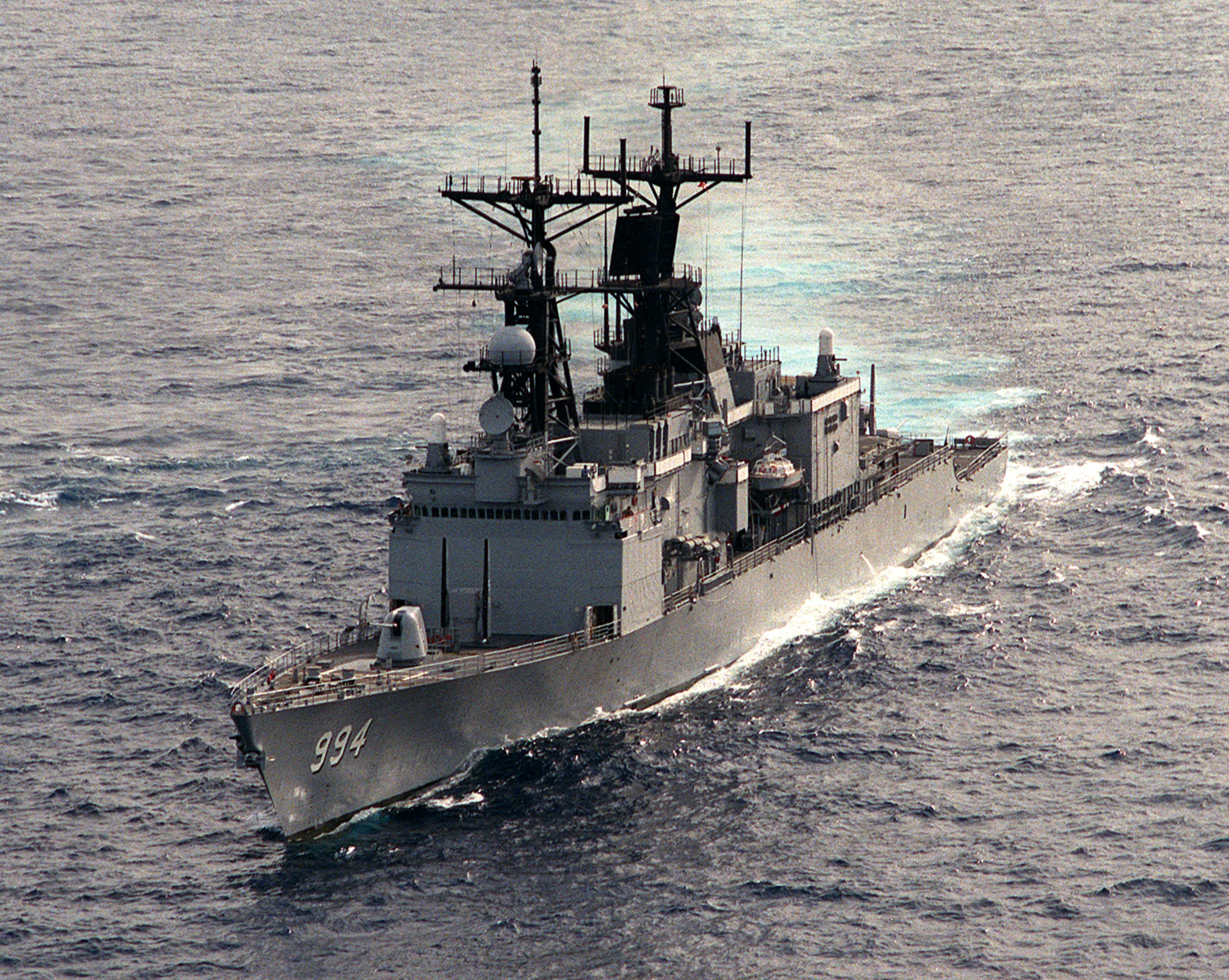
- USS Callaghan on 30 January 1987

History

United States
- Name: Callaghan
- Namesake: Daniel Callaghan
- Ordered: 23 March 1978
- Builder: Ingalls Shipbuilding
- Laid down: 23 October 1978
- Launched: 1 December 1979
- Commissioned: 29 August 1981
- Decommissioned: 31 March 1998
- Stricken: 31 March 1998
- Identification: Callsign: NDJC; Hull number: DDG-994
- Fate: Sold to Taiwan, 30 May 2003; commissioned as ROCS Su Ao (DDG-1802)
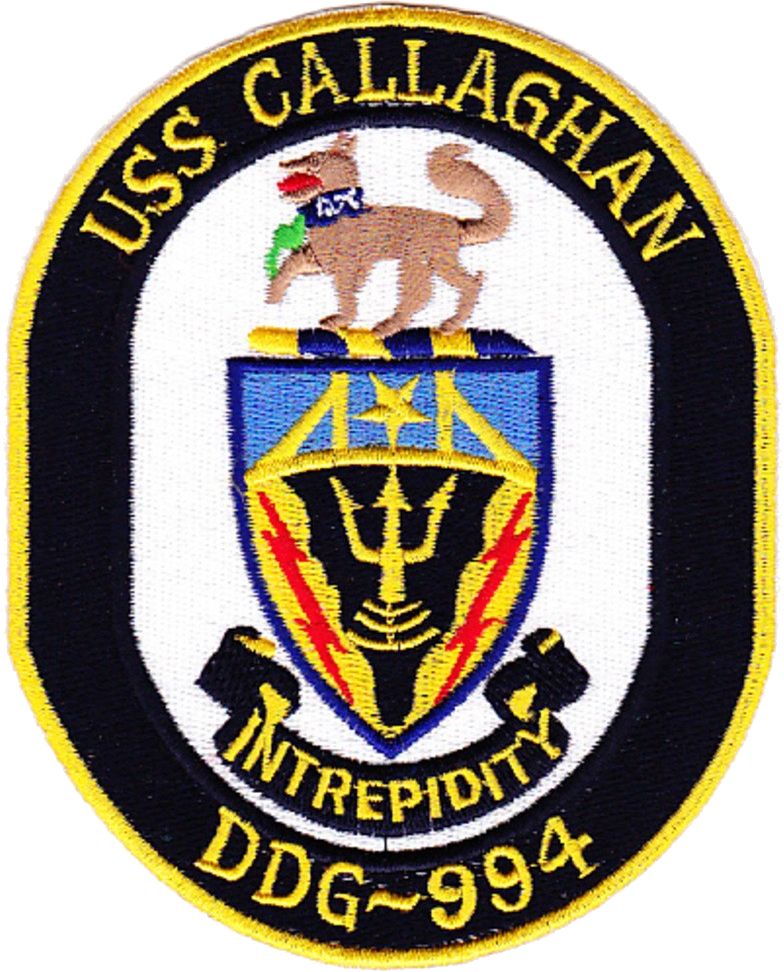
- Badge

General characteristics
- Class & type: Kidd-class destroyer
- Displacement: 9,783 tons full
- Length: 171.6 m (563 ft)
- Beam: 16.8 m (55 ft)
- Propulsion: 4 × General Electric LM2500-30 gas turbines, 80,000 shp total
- Speed: 33 knots (61 km/h)
- Complement: 31 officers; 332 enlisted
- Sensors & processing systems: AN/SPS-48E 3D air search radar; AN/SPS-49 2D air search radar; SPG-60 gun fire control radar; AN/SPG-51 missile fire control radar; AN/SPS-55 surface search radar; AN/SPQ-9A gun fire control radar; SQS-53 sonar
- Electronic warfare & decoys: AN/SLQ-32(V)3
- Armament: 2 × Mark 26 Standard missile launchers; 2 × Mark 141 quad launcher with 8 × RGM-84 Harpoon; 2 × Mark 15 20 mm Phalanx CIWS; 2 × Mark 45 5 in (127 mm) / 54 caliber gun; 2 × Mark 32 triple tube mounts with 6 × Mark 46 torpedoes
- Aircraft carried: 1 × SH-3 Sea King or; 2 × SH-2 Seasprite

USS Callaghan (DD/DDG-994) was the second ship of the Kidd class of destroyers operated by the U.S. Navy. Derived from the Spruance class, these vessels were designed for air defense in hot weather. She was named for Rear Admiral Daniel J. Callaghan, who was killed in action aboard his flagship, the heavy cruiser San Francisco, during the Naval Battle of Guadalcanal on 13 November 1942.

Originally to be named Daryush, the ship was ordered by the Imperial State of Iran, but was undelivered when the 1979 Iranian Revolution occurred. Subsequent to this, the U.S. Navy elected to commission her and her sister ships for service in the Persian Gulf and Mediterranean Sea, as they were equipped with heavy-duty air conditioning and were also well suited to filtering sand and the NBC warfare contaminants.

== History ==
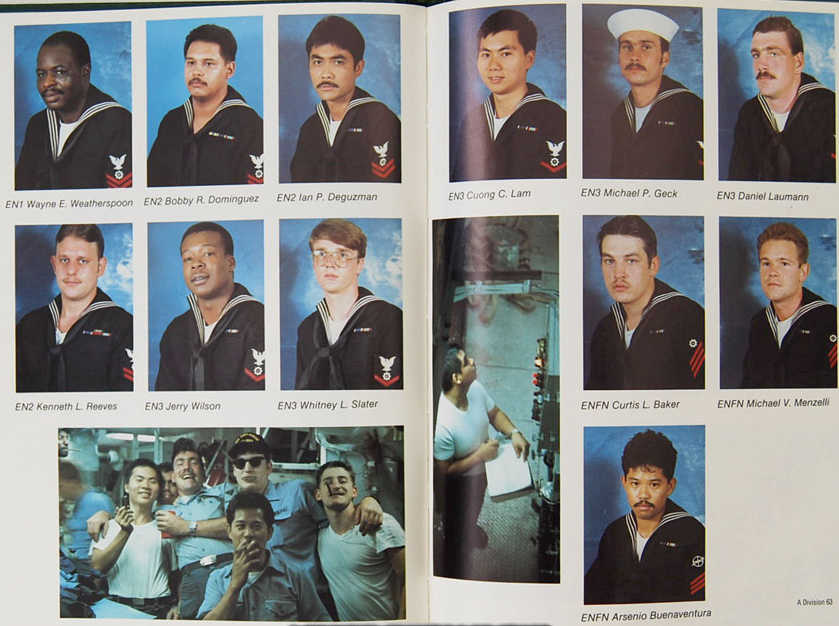
A page of a cruise book from 1987, showing sailors of Callaghan at that time.

=== 1981–1998: U.S. service ===
She was commissioned in 1981, and home ported in San Diego County, California at NAS North Island.

On 1 September 1983 Callaghan was on deployment to the Western Pacific, and making a port visit in Sasebo, Japan. Korean Air Lines Flight 007, on its way from Anchorage, Alaska to Seoul, South Korea, carrying 269 passengers and crew, strayed into Soviet airspace. A Soviet Sukhoi Su-15 fighter jet was sent up to destroy the intruding Boeing 747. After the attack, the Callaghan's crew was recalled and sent to search for survivors. During its survey of the crash site, the Callaghan was under very close scrutiny of the Soviet Navy, narrowly avoiding open conflict while engaged in their search. No survivors were found. The Callaghan received a Meritorious Unit Citation from the U.S. Navy and a special citation from the South Korean government for its role in the mission.

Callaghan earned her first Battle Efficiency E for grade period July 1983 to December 1984, and earned the Humanitarian Service Medal for saving two boatloads of people in the South China Sea.

For grading period January 1985 to June 1986 Callaghan earned her second Battle Efficiency E by winning all the awards from the ships in competition. On her return to port, with the news of her clean sweep, the captain ordered that every lanyard on the ship would display a broom, to honor the crew and show all ships present the outstanding accomplishment. Clean sweeps are rare.

Following this cruise, Callaghan underwent a short Ship Repair Availability (SRA) before deploying independently to the Persian Gulf for Operation Earnest Will in August of 1988. "Callaghan left San Diego for a six-month deployment on 11 August 1988, making stops at Pearl Harbor (17–18 August), Subic Bay (2–5 September) and Singapore (9–10 September) en route to the Middle East, where the eight-year war between Iran and Iraq was drawing to its conclusion. The destroyer transited the Strait of Hormuz on 20 September, entering the Persian Gulf. With Sitrah, Bahrain, as her base of operations, Callaghan conducted 22 escort and accompaniment operations during her time in the Gulf. She was underway from 26 September–14 October before taking a short break at Abu Dhabi, United Arab Emirates. HSL-35 Detachment (Det) 3 was attached to Callaghan for the deployment and in October 1988 flew more hours than any other LAMPS-I helo detachment and received U.S. Pacific Fleet’s LAMPS Safety Award. Resuming operations from 18 October–7 November, Callaghan then headed to Masirah Anchorage, Oman, for a week-long tender availability with Prairie (AD-15) from 10–17 November.

Following her maintenance period, the ship once again resumed Gulf patrols until Christmas Eve, when she transited the Strait of Hormuz and commenced the voyage back to the United States. Touching first at Colombo, Sri Lanka, to refuel on 28 December, Callaghan’s crew celebrated the new year in Phuket, Thailand, from 1–5 January 1989. The ship’s route home then took her to Singapore (6–8 January), Subic Bay (11–14 January), Hong Kong (16–21 January), and Pearl Harbor (2–4 February). Callaghan sailed in to San Diego on 10 February 1989. Her crew was awarded the Armed Forces Expeditionary Medal for their work in the Persian Gulf during this deployment." https://www.history.navy.mil/content/history/nhhc/research/histories/ship-histories/danfs/c/callaghan-ii.html

Also of note, on April 27th, 1989, during routine drug interdiction operations, Callaghan detected a high-speed contact off Colombia waters. When the sun rose, the contact was visually identified as a high-speed cigarette boat. Callaghan pursued the contact for over three days, and in the final three hours the craft dumped its load of illegal drugs. Once completed the craft was able to accelerate and outran Callaghan. It was pursued by a high-speed craft and helicopters until the cigarette boat reached Colombia territorial waters. Callaghan returned and fished 3.5 metric tons of watertight cocaine bundles floating in the water. The bales tested to be pure cocaine and had a street value at over $1 billion. They were individually unloaded by the crew dressed in whites during the first CONUS port call upon return from the deployment in a spectacular media event covered by all networks in NAVSTA San Diego.

In September 1989, Callaghan put into Long Beach Naval Shipyard for a year-long overhaul, during which she received a designated "new threat upgrade" to her radar and engineering systems, which was completed in September 1990.

In 1992 the Callaghan did a world cruise. She left San Diego 21 Jan with two other destroyers sailing to the Persian Gulf. The first stop of the cruise was Honolulu 27–28 Jan 1992. Where there was a change of command ceremony. The ships then sailed to Subic Bay, Philippines arriving 10 Feb for a short working port stop. The next stop was Singapore 18 Feb. Then stopping for fuel in Columbo, Sri Lanka on 24th. On 1 March the ships arrived in the gulf and went onto separate missions. The Callaghan took up "shotgun" for the USS America CV-66. Stopping in Jubail, Saudi Arabia. Bahrain. Abu Dhabi, United Arab Emirates (U.A.E.). Jebel U.A.E.. Dubai, U.A.E.. Damman, Saudi Arabia. Kuwait City, Kuwait. In May 1992 the Callaghan began its independent cruise. Transiting the Suez Canal 12 May. The Callaghan steamed up the coast of Italy, made a port call at Monte Carlo and after that anchored at Toulon, France 16 May. Then made a port call in Barcelona, Spain 21 May. Callaghan began to sail across the Atlantic Ocean, stopping at the Azore Islands for fuel. Arriving at St. Thomas, US Virgin Islands 5 July. On 12 July the Callaghan transited the Panama Canal. She then made their last port call of Acapulco, Mexico 16 July. Finally returning to San Diego late July. The ship's crew earned the Royal order of Magellan certificate for sailing around the world. Both ditch certificates (Panama and Suez) and the crossing the international date line certificate.

Callaghan was decommissioned in April 1998.

== Awards ==
- Navy Meritorious Unit Commendation – (1983)
- Battle "E" – (1983-84, 1985-86)
- Armed Forces Expeditionary Medal
- National Defense Service Medal
- Humanitarian Service Medal – (1984)
- Sea Service Deployment Ribbon

=== 2004–present: Taiwanese service ===
Callaghan was sold to Taiwan in 2004. She was originally to be named Ming Teh, but it was later decided to name her ROCS Su Ao (DDG-1802), after the Su-Ao naval base in eastern Taiwan, and become the second ship of the new ROCN Kee Lung class of destroyers.

After almost two years of refit and training in the U.S., Su Ao was commissioned on 17 December 2005 at Kee-Lung naval port in northern Taiwan.

== Popular culture ==
- In the movie Threads, the ship collided with the Russian battlecruiser Kirov during a naval battle in the Persian Gulf.
