= USS Kidd =

USS Kidd may refer to:

- USS Kidd (DD-661), a Fletcher-class destroyer, serving from 1943 to 1964
- USS Kidd (DDG-993), the first ship of the Kidd class of destroyers, serving from 1981 to 1998
- USS Kidd (DDG-100), an Arleigh Burke-class destroyer commissioned in 2007 and currently in service
