= ROCS Ma Kong =

Kee Lung-class guided-missile destroyer

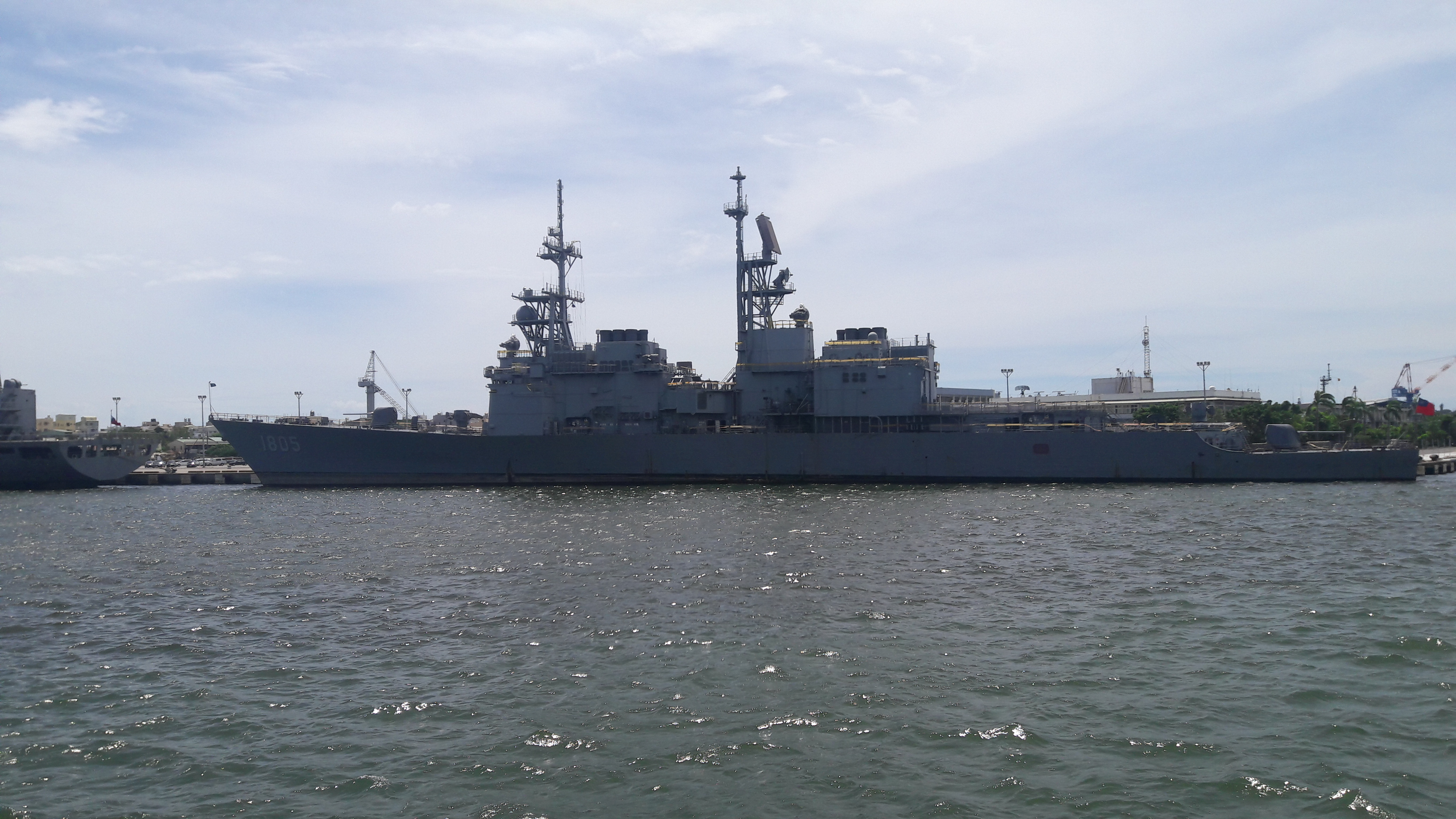
- ROCS Ma Kung in Kaohsiung Harbor

History

Taiwan
- Builder: Litton Ingalls, Pascagoula, Mississippi
- Laid down: 26 June 1978
- Launched: 24 May 1980 as USS Chandler (DDG-996)
- Acquired: 30 May 2003
- Name: ROCS Ma Kong (DDG-1805)
- Commissioned: 3 November 2006
- Status: Ship in active service

General characteristics
- Class & type: Kee Lung-class destroyer
- Displacement: Light: 6,950 t (6,840 long tons; 7,660 short tons); Full: 9,574 t (9,423 long tons; 10,554 short tons); Dead Weight: 2,624 t (2,583 long tons; 2,892 short tons)
- Length: 171.6 m (563 ft)
- Beam: 16.8 m (55 ft)
- Draft: 10.1 m (33.1 ft)
- Propulsion: 4 × General Electric LM2500-30 gas turbines, 80,000 shp total (60 MW)
- Speed: 33 knots (61 km/h)
- Sensors & processing systems: SPS-48E air search radar; SPS-49(V)5 air search radar; SPG-60 gun fire control radar; SPS-55 surface search radar; 2 × SPG-51D Missile Control Radar; SPQ-9A gun fire control radar; SPS-64 Navigation Radar; SQS-53 hull-mounted sonar
- Electronic warfare & decoys: AN/SLQ-32(V)3 OUTBOARD II EW Suite; Mark 36 SRBOC; AN/SLQ-25 Nixie towed sonar decoy
- Armament: 2 × Mark 26 launchers with; 68 × SM-2 Block IIIA SAM; 1 × Mark 141 quad launcher with; 4 × RGM-84 Harpoon; 2 × Mark 45 5 in (127 mm) gun; 2 × Mark 15 20 mm Phalanx CIWS; 4 × 12.7mm MGs; 2 × Mark 32 triple tube mounts with; 6 × Mark 46 torpedoes
- Aircraft carried: 1 Sikorsky S-70C(M) helicopter

ROCS Ma Kong (馬公, DDG-1805) is a Kee Lung-class guided-missile destroyer currently in active service of Republic of China Navy. It is named after Ma Kong City, Penghu Island, a port city and the location of an important ROCN base.

She was formerly the American Kidd-class destroyer USS Chandler (DDG-996) which was decommissioned from the United States Navy in September 1999 and sold to the Republic of China Navy on 30 May 2003.

== Ship design ==
On January 1, 2015, the Republic of China Navy invited journalists to board the Magong ship to participate in a maritime exercise off the southwest coast of Taiwan and interview the officers and soldiers on board. The ship's kitchen is mainly heated by steam discharged from the boiler. The ship's kitchen has a deep fryer but it will be closed during navigation to prevent the hot oil in the pot from capsizing due to strong winds and waves at sea. The female officers and soldiers' quarters "Soldier Cabin 1" are converted from male officers and soldiers' quarters, with independent washing machines, water dispensers, dormitories and fitness equipment. The first soldier cabin is designed with independence and safety in mind. There are entrances and exits on both sides of the cabin. There are monitoring systems above the entrances and exits. Someone monitors the entry and exit of the cabin around the clock to ensure the safety of female officers and soldiers.

== Ship History ==
During the 2022 Taiwan Circumnavigation Military Exercise, on August 6, the Ministry of National Defense of the Republic of China released a video stating that this ship was monitoring the PLA Navy's Ma'anshan Frigate in the waters east of Taiwan, the two ships were only 80 ft (24 m) apart when they were closest to each other.

On November 10, 2022, the ship drove away the PLA's Xiamen destroyer near the eastern waters.

On April 23, 2025, smoke was seen in the storage room of the Magong destroyer moored in Suao Township, but no casualties were caused.
