= Kidd-class destroyer =

U.S. class of guided-missile destroyers

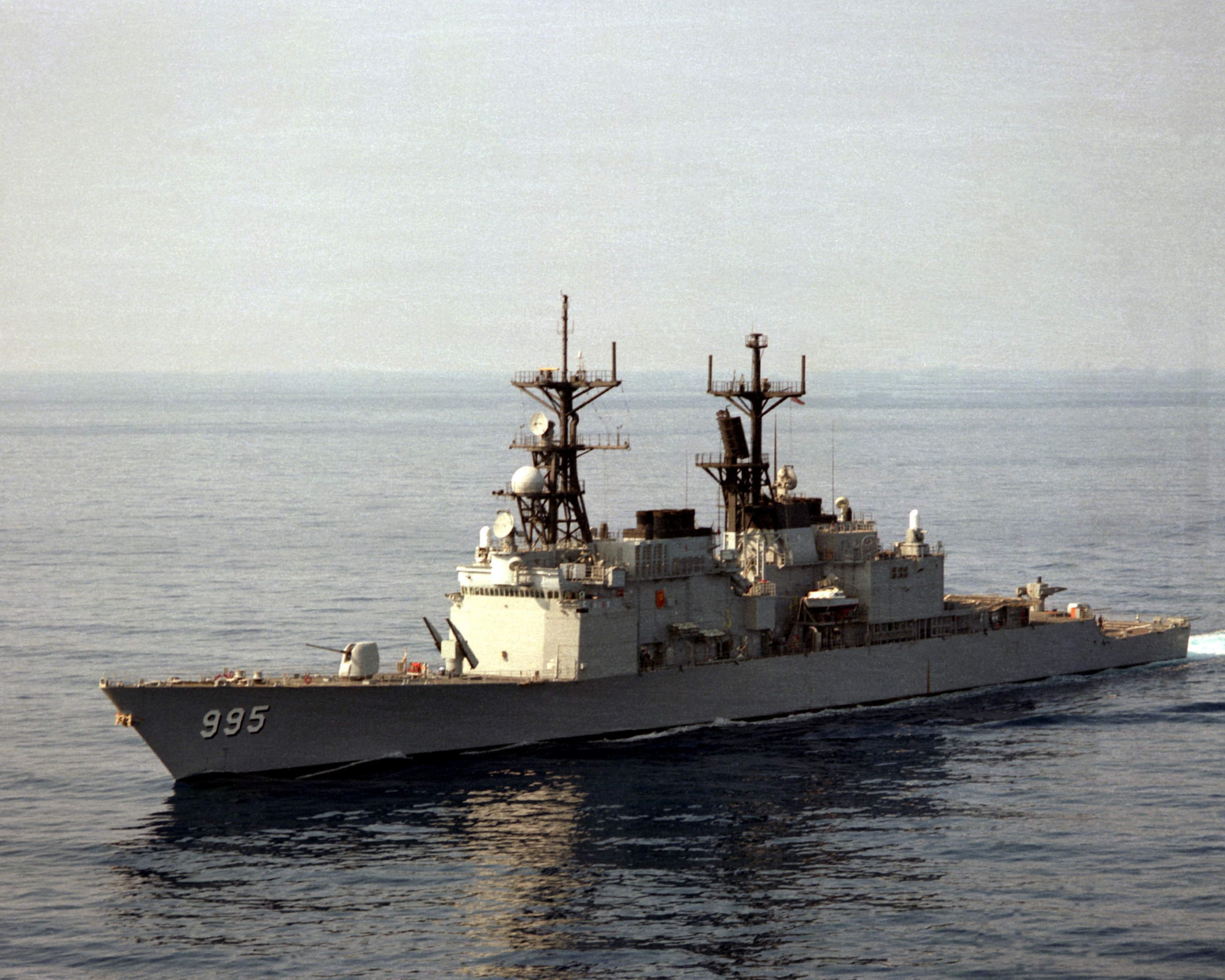
- USS Scott on 21 March 1986

Class overview
- Name: Kidd-class destroyer
- Builders: Ingalls Shipbuilding, MS (4)
- Operators: United States Navy; Republic of China Navy (as Kee Lung class)
- Preceded by: Spruance class
- Succeeded by: Arleigh Burke class
- Subclasses: Kee Lung class
- Built: 1978–1982
- In commission: 1981–1999 (United States Navy); 2005–present (Republic of China Navy)
- Completed: 4
- Active: 4 (Taiwan)

General characteristics
- Type: Guided-missile destroyer
- Displacement: Light: 7,289 t (7,174 long tons; 8,035 short tons); Full: 9,783 t (9,628 long tons; 10,784 short tons); Dead Weight: 2,494 t (2,455 long tons; 2,749 short tons)
- Length: 563 ft (172 m)
- Beam: 55 ft (17 m)
- Draught: 31.5 ft (9.6 m)
- Installed power: 3 × Allison 501-K17 ship service gas turbine generators (2,500 kW (3,400 hp) each)
- Propulsion: 4 × General Electric LM2500 gas turbines, 2 shafts, 80,000 shp (60 MW)
- Speed: 33 knots (61 km/h; 38 mph)
- Range: 6,000 nautical miles (11,000 km; 6,900 mi) at 20 knots (37 km/h; 23 mph); 3,300 nautical miles (6,100 km; 3,800 mi) at 30 knots (56 km/h; 35 mph)
- Complement: 28 officers; 320 enlisted
- Sensors & processing systems: SPS-48E 3D Air Search Radar; SPS-49(V)5 2D Air Search Radar; 2 × SPG-51D Missile Control Radar; 1 × AN/SPG-60 Gun Fire Control Radar; SPS-55 Surface Search Radar; SPQ-9A Gun Fire Control Radar; SQS-53 hull-mounted sonar
- Electronic warfare & decoys: AN/SLQ-32(V)3 OUTBOARD II EW Suite; Mark 36 SRBOC; AN/SLQ-25 Nixie towed sonar decoy
- Armament: 2 × 5-inch (127mm) 54 calibre Mark 45 dual purpose guns; 2 × Mk 26 launchers for 68 × RIM-66 SM-2MR Block IIIA（RIM-66K-2 and RUR-5 ASROC; 2 × 20 mm Phalanx CIWS Mark 15 cannons (Varies from ship to ship, Block 0/1/1A/1B); 2 × 4 Mk 141 Harpoon missile canisters; 2 × Mark 32 triple 12.75 in (324 mm) torpedo tubes (Mk46 torpedoes) (14 torpedoes)
- Aircraft carried: 1 SH-3 helicopter or 2 SH-2 Seasprite LAMPS helicopters
- Aviation facilities: Flight deck and enclosed hangar for up to two medium-lift helicopters

The Kidd-class destroyers are a series of four guided-missile destroyers (DDGs) based on the Spruance class. In contrast to their predecessor's focus on anti-submarine warfare, the Kidds were designed as more advanced multipurpose ships with the addition of considerably enhanced anti-aircraft capabilities. Originally ordered for the former Imperial Iranian Navy, the contracts were canceled when the 1979 Iranian Revolution began, and the ships were completed for the United States Navy. They were decommissioned in 1999 and sold to Taiwan, where they have served in the Republic of China Navy as the Kee Lung class since 2005.

== History ==
These destroyers were originally ordered by the last Shah of Iran for service in the Persian Gulf in an air defence role around 1973/74. The original order of six ships was tentatively assigned hull numbers DD 993–998 by the U.S. Navy but it was reduced to four ships after U.S. Congress declined to halt the original production run of 30 Spruance ships. Compared to the preceding Spruance class, they retained the former's anti-submarine capabilities while adding two Tartar-D missile launchers for the Mark 26/Standard anti-aircraft missile system. In order to operate more effectively in the Middle East, they also had four air conditioning plants to the Spruances' three, additional dust separators on their gas turbines' air intakes, and increased water distillation capacity. The Shah was overthrown in the Iranian Revolution, prior to Iran accepting delivery of the ships, causing the United States Navy to integrate the vessels into its own fleet in 1981–82 as the Kidd class.

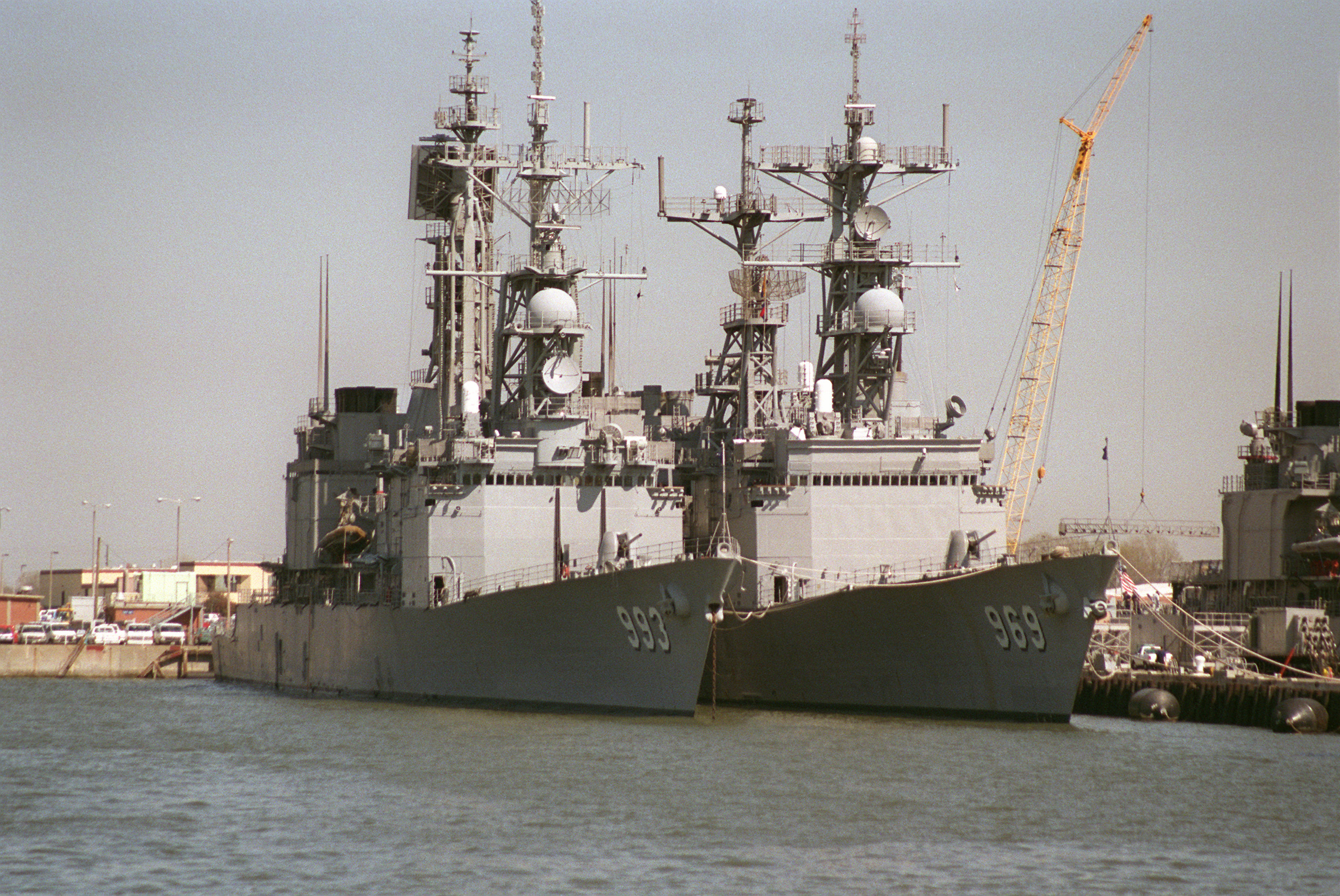
USS Kidd and USS Peterson.

On 3 February 1979, the Iranian government canceled the second two ships in the class, signing a memorandum of understanding indicating that they were available for acquisition by the U.S. Navy. On 21 February 1979, the Iranian Prime Minister notified the U.S. government that Iran intended to terminate the contract of the first two ships, officially cancelling delivery on 8 March 1979.

Each ship in the class was named after a U.S. Navy Admiral who had died in combat in the Pacific in World War II:

- USS Kidd (DDG-993) was named after Rear Admiral Isaac C. Kidd, who died on the bridge of his flagship, USS Arizona, during the attack on Pearl Harbor on 7 December 1941.
- USS Callaghan (DDG-994) was named after Rear Admiral Daniel Callaghan, who was killed during a surface action at the Naval Battle of Guadalcanal, 13 November 1942, aboard USS San Francisco.
- USS Scott (DDG-995) was named after Rear Admiral Norman Scott, who was killed during the same surface action that killed Admiral Callaghan at the First Naval Battle of Guadalcanal, aboard USS Atlanta.
- USS Chandler (DDG-996) was named after Rear Admiral Theodore Chandler, who died on 7 January 1945, as a result of burns received from a kamikaze crashing into his flagship, USS Louisville, the previous day.

Because they were equipped with heavy-duty air conditioning and other features that made them suitable in hot climates, they tended to be used in the Middle East, specifically the Persian Gulf itself. During their service with the U.S. Navy from the 1980s to the late 1990s, the ships were popularly known as the "Ayatollah" class.

In 1988–90, the Kidds received the "New Threat Upgrade", which allowed cooperative engagement with Aegis Ticonderoga-class cruisers, enabling the cruisers to control the Kidds' surface-to-air missiles in flight while the destroyers remained electronically silent. However, the arrival of the Aegis-equipped Arleigh Burke-class destroyers led to the accelerated retirement of the Kidd class.

All four ships were decommissioned from the U.S. Navy in the late 1990s and were initially offered for sale to Australia in 1997 for A$30 million each. The Royal Australian Navy was a strong supporter of buying the Kidd-class destroyers to replace the Perth class as their air warfare ships. In 1999, the offer was rejected, based on extensive problems the Royal Australian Navy had encountered during the acquisition of two surplus Newport-class tank landing ships from the U.S. Navy in 1994. In the early 1990s the Labor government of Paul Keating chose to maintain the Royal Australian Navy's existing Adelaide-class frigates instead of replacing them with the more expensive and much more labour-intensive, but more capable Kidd-class destroyers. Under the succeeding Liberal government of John Howard, in the mid-1990s they commenced the SEA 1390, also known as the FFG Upgrade Project, to improve the Adelaide frigates' capabilities; however, this project ran over costs and was behind schedule.

After the Australian refusal, the four ships were offered to Greece, which also refused.

== Sale and reactivation ==
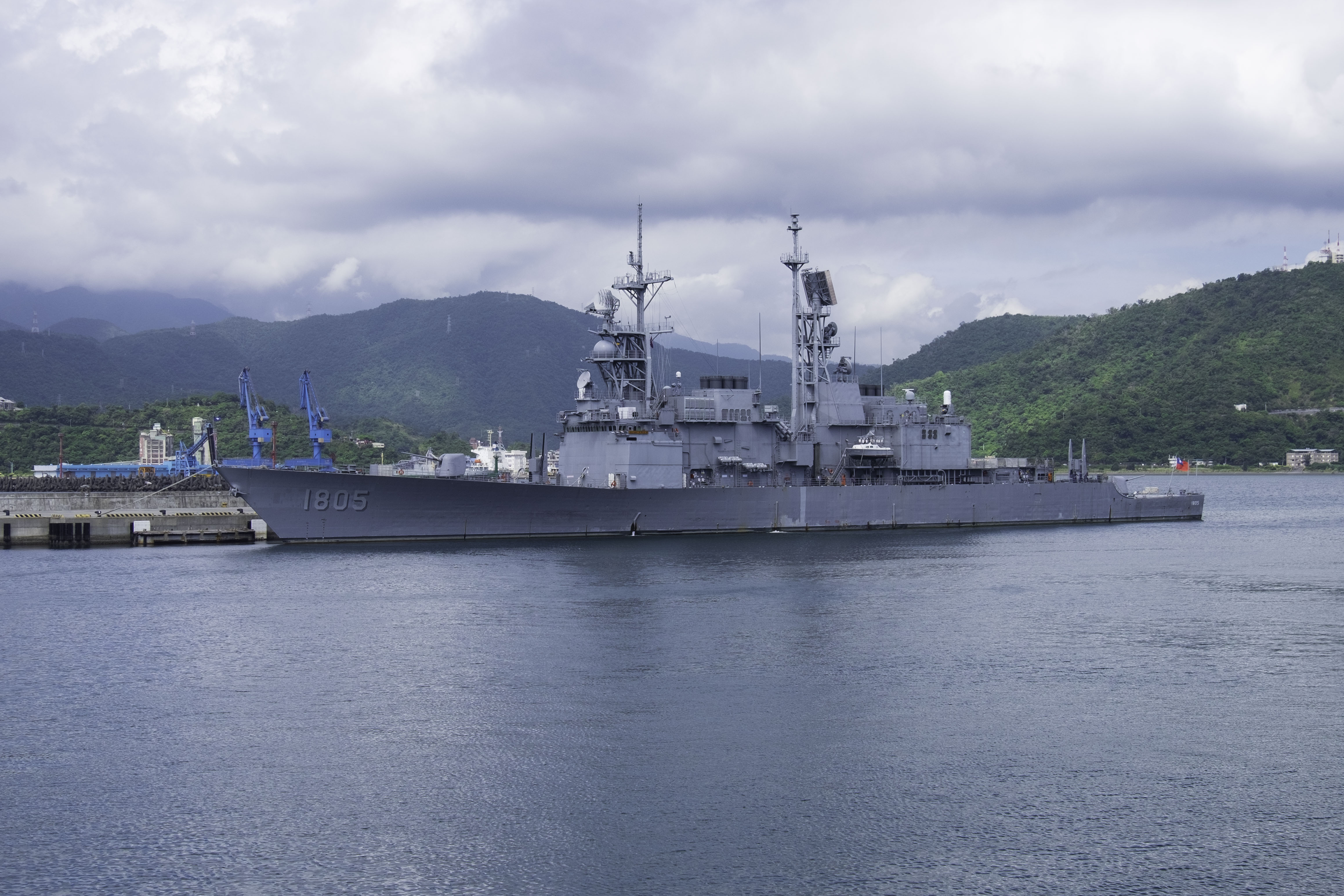
- ROCS Ma Kung in 25 August 2018

Class overview
- Name: Kee Lung-class destroyer
- Builders: Ingalls Shipbuilding, Pascagoula, Mississippi
- Operators: United States Navy (as Kidd class); Republic of China Navy
- Preceded by: Spruance class
- Succeeded by: Arleigh Burke class
- Built: 1978–1982
- In commission: 1981–1999 (United States Navy); 2005–present (Republic of China Navy)
- Completed: 4
- Active: 4 (Taiwan)

General characteristics
- Type: Guided-missile destroyer
- Displacement: Light: 6,950 t (6,840 long tons; 7,660 short tons); Full: 9,574 t (9,423 long tons; 10,554 short tons); Dead Weight: 2,624 t (2,583 long tons; 2,892 short tons)
- Length: 563 ft (172 m)
- Beam: 55 ft (17 m)
- Draught: 33.1 ft (10.1 m)
- Propulsion: 4 × General Electric LM2500 gas turbines, 2 shafts, 80,000 shp (60 MW)
- Speed: 33 knots (61 km/h; 38 mph)
- Range: 6,000 nautical miles (11,000 km; 6,900 mi) at 20 knots (37 km/h; 23 mph); 3,300 nautical miles (6,100 km; 3,800 mi) at 30 knots (56 km/h; 35 mph)
- Complement: 31 officers; 363 enlisted
- Sensors & processing systems: SPS-48E Air Search Radar; SPS-49(V)5 Air Search Radar; 2 × SPG-51D Missile Control Radar; 1 × AN/SPG-60 Radar Gun Fire Control Radar; SPS-55 Surface Search Radar; SPQ-9A Gun Fire Control Radar; SPS-64 Navigation Radar; SQS-53 hull-mounted sonar
- Electronic warfare & decoys: AN/SLQ-32(V)3 OUTBOARD II EW Suite; Mark 36 SRBOC; AN/SLQ-25 Nixie towed sonar decoy
- Armament: 2 × 5-inch (127mm) 54 calibre Mark 45 dual purpose guns; 2 × Mk 26 launchers for 68 × RIM-66 SM-2MR Block IIIA（RIM-66K-2; 2 × 20 mm Phalanx CIWS Mark 15 cannons (Varies from ship to ship, Block 0/1/1A/1B); 4 × 12.7mm MGs; 1 × 4 Mk 141 Harpoon missile canisters; 2 × Mark 32 triple 12.75 in (324 mm) torpedo tubes (Mk46 torpedoes)
- Aircraft carried: 1 or 2 Sikorsky S-70C(M) helicopter(s) (Note: Unlike her sister ships, ROCS Lee Kung has the LAMPS III system installed, so can carry 2 of these helicopters.)
- Aviation facilities: Flight deck and enclosed hangar for up to one medium-lift helicopter

In 2001, the U.S. authorized the reactivation and sale of all four ships to Taiwan (Republic of China). All four have been transferred to the Republic of China Navy under the Kuang Hua VII program. They were sold for a total price of US$732 million with upgraded hardware, overhaul, activation, and training, and included a reduced missile loadout of 148 SM-2 Block IIIA and 32 RGM-84L Block II Harpoon anti-ship missiles. The reactivation was done in Charleston, South Carolina, by VSE/BAV.

=== Kee Lung-class destroyers ===
The first two ships, ex-Scott and ex-Callaghan, arrived at Su-ao, a military port in eastern Taiwan, in December 2005, and were named Kee Lung and Su Ao in a commissioning ceremony on 17 December 2005. Following the tradition of ship class naming, ROCN has referred to these vessels as Kee Lung-class destroyers, with the ships named after military ports in Taiwan. The remaining two units, ex-Kidd and ex-Chandler, were delivered in 2006, and named Tso Ying and Ma Kong, respectively.

The opposition-led Legislature Yuan originally allocated only enough money to purchase half of the SM-2 missiles that the destroyers can carry; a further purchase of 100 supplemental SM-2MRs was included in the 2007 annual budget to ensure all four ships had a full load of SM-2.

By end of 2008, Su Ao was spotted to have eight HF-3 AShMs installed in place of eight Harpoon AShMs. It has been speculated from 2014 on that a navalized Sky Bow missile system, currently planned for an upcoming shipbuilding programme that involves the procurement of up to 15 general purpose frigates and three or four air defense destroyers, will also be replacing the Standard Missile system on these vessels. No plan for any Mk 26-compatible version of the Sky Bow III missile is ever known to have existed.

In 2025 it was reported that the navy planned to upgrade the class with HF-2E missiles.

== Ships in class ==
Ships of the Kidd destroyer class
Name	Hull no.	Crest	Builder	Laid down	Launched	Commissioned	Decommissioned	Status
Kidd	DDG-993		Ingalls Shipbuilding	26 June 1978	11 August 1979	27 March 1981	12 March 1998	Sold to Taiwan, 30 May 2003; commissioned as ROCS Tso Ying (DDG-1803)
Callaghan	DDG-994		Ingalls Shipbuilding	23 October 1978	1 December 1979	29 August 1981	31 March 1998	Sold to Taiwan, 30 May 2003; commissioned as ROCS Su Ao (DDG-1802)
Scott	DDG-995		Ingalls Shipbuilding	12 February 1979	1 March 1980	24 October 1981	10 December 1998	Sold to Taiwan, 30 May 2003; commissioned as ROCS Kee Lung (DDG-1801)
Chandler	DDG-996		Ingalls Shipbuilding	7 May 1979	28 June 1980	13 March 1982	23 September 1999	Sold to Taiwan, 30 May 2003; commissioned as ROCS Ma Kong (DDG-1805)

- Original name: USS Kidd (DDG-993)
  - Tentative Iranian name: Kourosh
  - Present name: Tso Ying (左營, DDG-1803); was to be Tung Teh (同德); commissioned on 3 November 2006
- Original name: USS Callaghan (DDG-994)
  - Tentative Iranian name: Dariush
  - Present name: Su Ao (蘇澳, DDG-1802); was to be Ming Teh (明德); commissioned on 17 December 2005
- Original name: USS Scott (DDG-995)
  - Tentative Iranian name: Nader
  - Present name: Kee Lung (基隆, DDG-1801); was to be Chi Teh (紀德); commissioned on 17 December 2005
- Original name: USS Chandler (DDG-996)
  - Tentative Iranian name: Anoshirvan
  - Present name: Ma Kong (馬公, DDG-1805); was to be Wu Teh (武德); commissioned on 3 November 2006

== See also ==
- List of destroyer classes in service

Equivalent destroyers of the same era

- Udaloy class
- Hatakaze class
- Rajput class
- Type 051D
- Almirante Brown class
