= AN/SPS-55 =

Cold War-era US Navy surface search and navigation radar

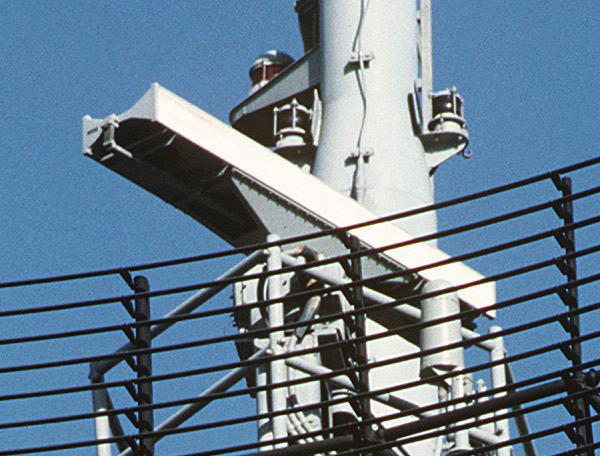
- AN/SPS-55 antenna aboard USS Samuel B. Roberts (FFG-58)
- Country of origin: United States
- Manufacturer: Cardion Electronics
- Introduced: 1971; 54 years ago
- Type: Navigation radar
- Frequency: 9.05–10 GHz (3.31–3.00 cm); X-band
- RPM: 16 rpm
- Range: >50 miles (43.4 nmi; 80.5 km)
- Azimuth: 1.5º
- Elevation: +/-10° centered on the horizon
- Power: 160 kW peak

The AN/SPS-55 is a solid state surface search and navigation radar. It was developed by Cardion Electronics for the U.S. Navy under a contract awarded in 1971. It was originally developed for a class of ships known as Patrol Frigates, but it was also installed on numerous Cruisers, Destroyers, and Minesweepers. It is an I band radar and its antenna consists of two waveguide slotted arrays mounted back-to-back. One array provides linear polarisation and the other provides circular polarisation. Polarisation is user selectable and the circular polarised array is more effective in reducing returns from precipitation.

In accordance with the Joint Electronics Type Designation System (JETDS), the "AN/SPS-55" designation represents the 55th design of an Army-Navy electronic device for surface ship search radar system. The JETDS system also now is used to name all Department of Defense electronic systems.

== Features ==
- Magnetron transmitter
- Low noise RF receiver
- Sensitivity time control
- Fast time constant filtering
- Sector radiate

The effective range of the radar is from 50 feet to beyond 50 miles. It is primarily used to detect other ships, coastlines and navigation hazards.

The "Sensitivity Time Control" automatically adjusts the gain of the RF receiver from low to high based on the time elapsed from the last transmitter pulse. This helps to adjust for the fact that nearby targets generate a larger return than distant targets of the same size.

The "Fast Time Constant Filtering" helps to remove targets which have a very large range size, like clouds, while passing targets with a smaller range size, like ships or aircraft.

The "Sector Radiate" allows the operator to turn off the transmitter for any sized pie shaped sector of the antenna's 360 degree rotation. An operator might want to do this to avoid detection by an enemy receiver which lies within a known or suspected location.

The installation of Field Change 13 disabled the antenna's circular polarisation feature. Field Change 13 was necessary to address reliability issues associated with the replacement version of the waveguide switch used for polarisation selection.

== Platforms ==
- Ticonderoga-class cruiser: AN/SPS-73 has replaced the AN/SPS-55
- Kidd-class destroyer
- Spruance-class destroyer
- Oliver Hazard Perry-class frigate
- Avenger-class mine countermeasures ship

== See also ==
- Electronics Technician
- List of radars
- List of military electronics of the United States
