= Mark 26 missile launcher =

Mark 26 Guided Missile Launching System
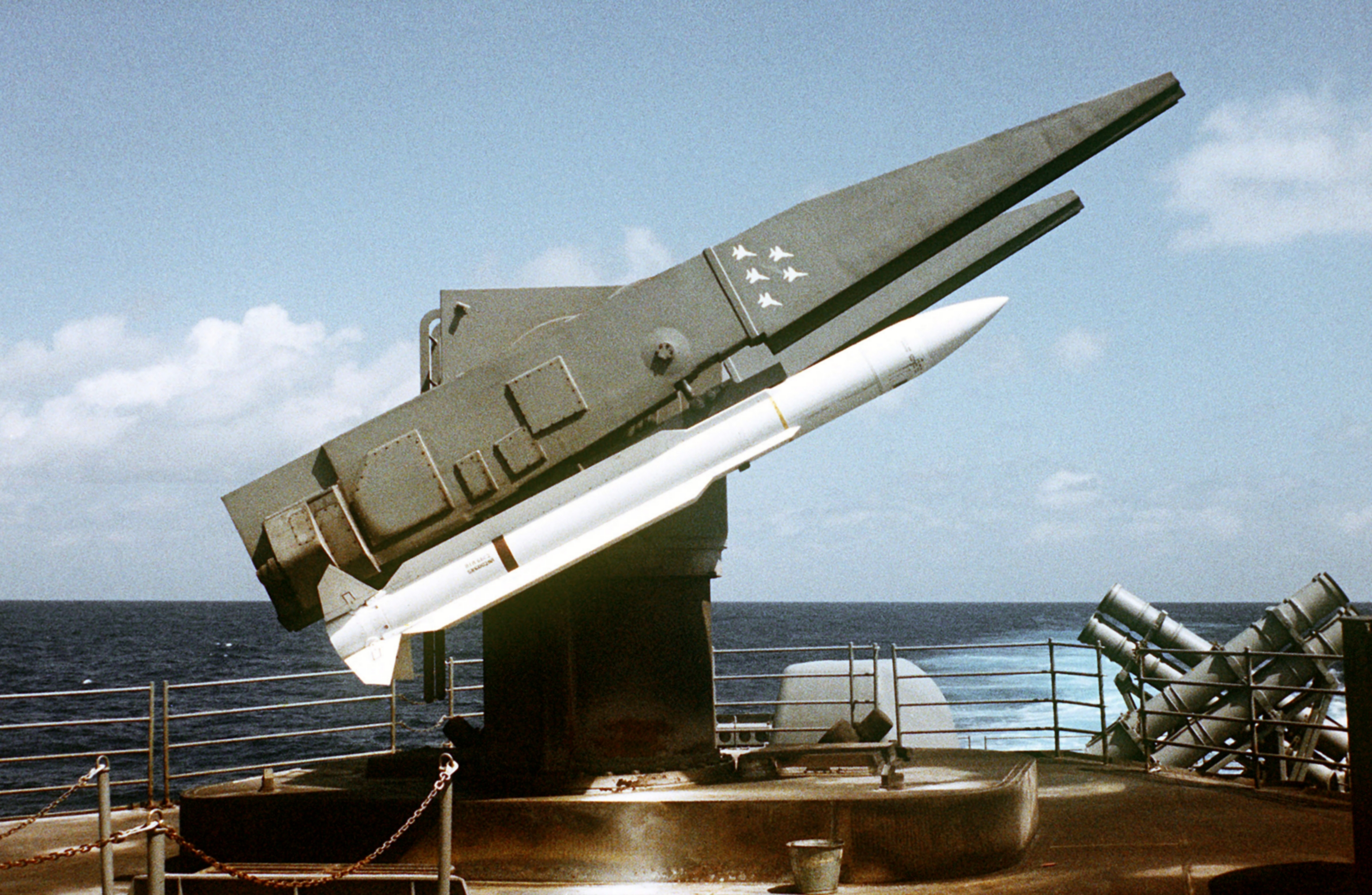
- A RIM-66 Standard MR on a Mark 26 launcher, USS Ticonderoga, 1983.
- Type: Guided Missile Launching System
- Place of origin: United States

Service history
- In service: 1976 - 2005 (USN); 2005 - present (ROCN)
- Used by: United States Navy (formerly); Republic of China Navy
- Wars: Cold War

Production history
- Designed: 1970s
- Manufacturer: FMC / United Defense / BAE
- No. built: 26 systems on 13 ships
- Variants: Mod 0 to 5

Specifications
- Rate of fire: 2 missiles every 9 seconds 1 second salvo delay

The Mark 26 Guided Missile Launching System (GMLS) was a United States Navy fully automated system that stows, handles, and launches a variety of missiles. The system supported RIM-66 Standard, RUR-5 ASROC, and potentially other weapons. The Mark 26 had the shortest reaction time and the fastest firing rate of any comparable dual arm shipboard launching system at the time. With only one man at the control console, a weapon can be selected, hoisted to the guide arm, and launched. Several mods (0 to 5) provided magazine capabilities of 24 to 64 missiles.

== History ==
The Mark 26 was installed aboard the Virginia-class cruiser, the Kidd-class destroyer, and the early Ticonderoga-class cruiser. It was one of the last rail-based missile launchers used by the US Navy. The system was deployed in limited numbers due to the advent of the Mark 41 Vertical Launching System; only the first five of twenty-seven Ticonderoga cruisers carried the Mark 26. With the Mark 26, two missiles could be on the rails and it could sustain a 9-second firing rate with a one-second salvo delay.

The Mark 26 provided ASROC capability in the late 1970s. The Mark 26 system was capable of launching nuclear ASROC and included appropriate safety measures. It used a system nuclear lock and a hanger rail nuclear lock. Loading of a nuclear weapon was permitted if either the system lock or the rail lock are unlocked. Both must be locked to prevent accidental or unauthorized loading of nuclear weapons onto the launch rails. These locks required crew intervention to unlock and the system key was different from the rail lock key.

== Usage ==
According to NAVEDTRA 14909 Gunner's Mate 3 & 2, Chapter 7:

- Mark 26 Mod 0 - 24 missiles, forward Virginia-class cruiser
- Mark 26 Mod 1 - 44 missiles, aft Virginia-class cruiser
- Mark 26 Mod 2 - 64 missiles, Strike cruiser, not deployed
- Mark 26 Mod 3 - 24 missiles, updated Mod 0 systems, forward Kidd-class destroyer
- Mark 26 Mod 4 - 44 missiles, updated Mod 1 systems, aft Kidd-class destroyer
- Mark 26 Mod 5 - 44 missiles, modified Mod 4 system for early Ticonderoga-class cruiser

On 11 September 1976, USS Virginia was commissioned, the first US Navy combat ship with the Mark 26 GMLS. Non-combatant USS Norton Sound also had the Mark 26 in the early 1970s for Aegis testing. USS Thomas S. Gates (CG-51) was the last US Navy ship using the Mark 26 GMLS and was decommissioned in December 2005. As of 2024, the Mark 26 is still in use by the Republic of China Navy on the former Kidd-class destroyers.

== Gallery ==
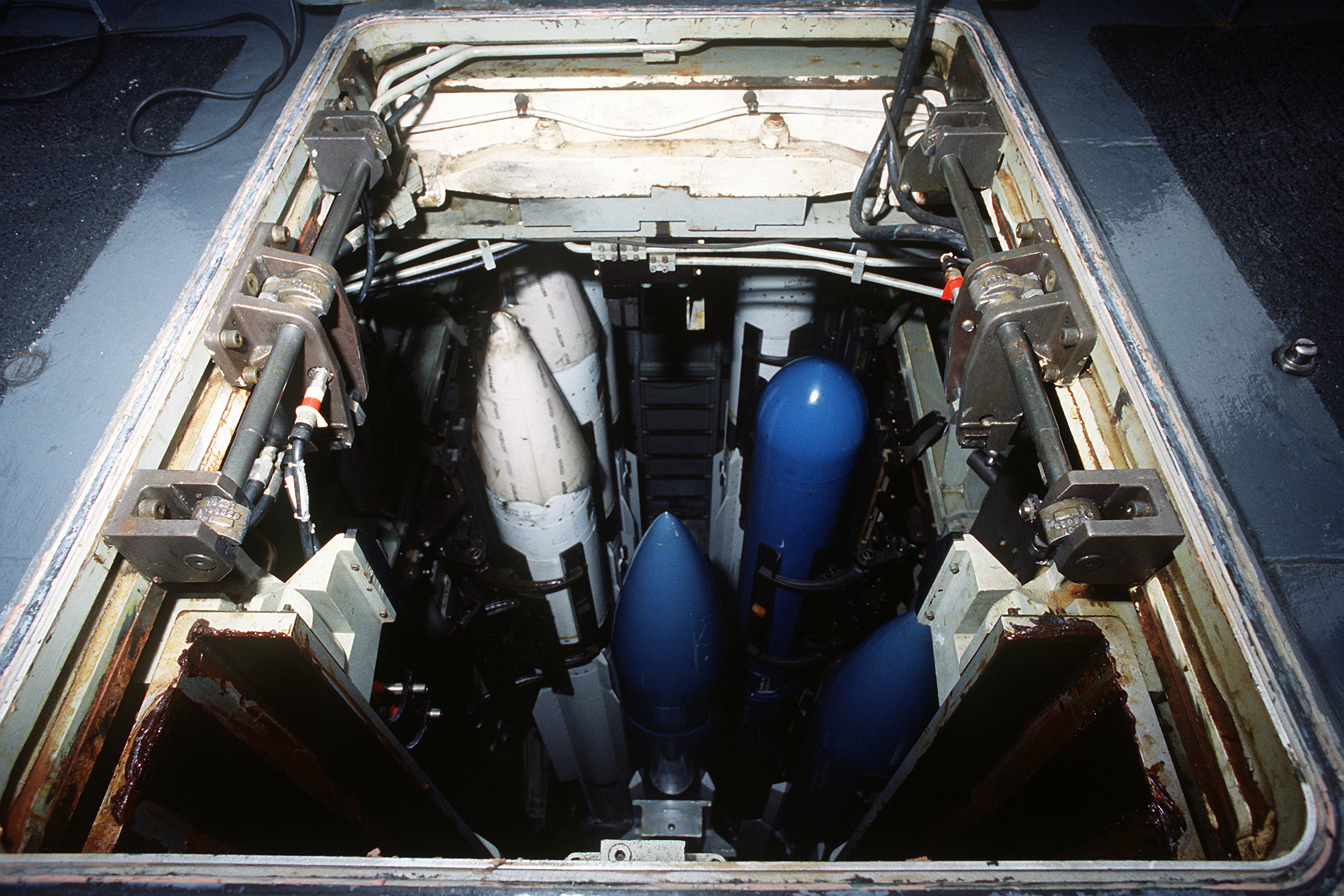
A view inside a Mark 26 magazine, USS Arkansas

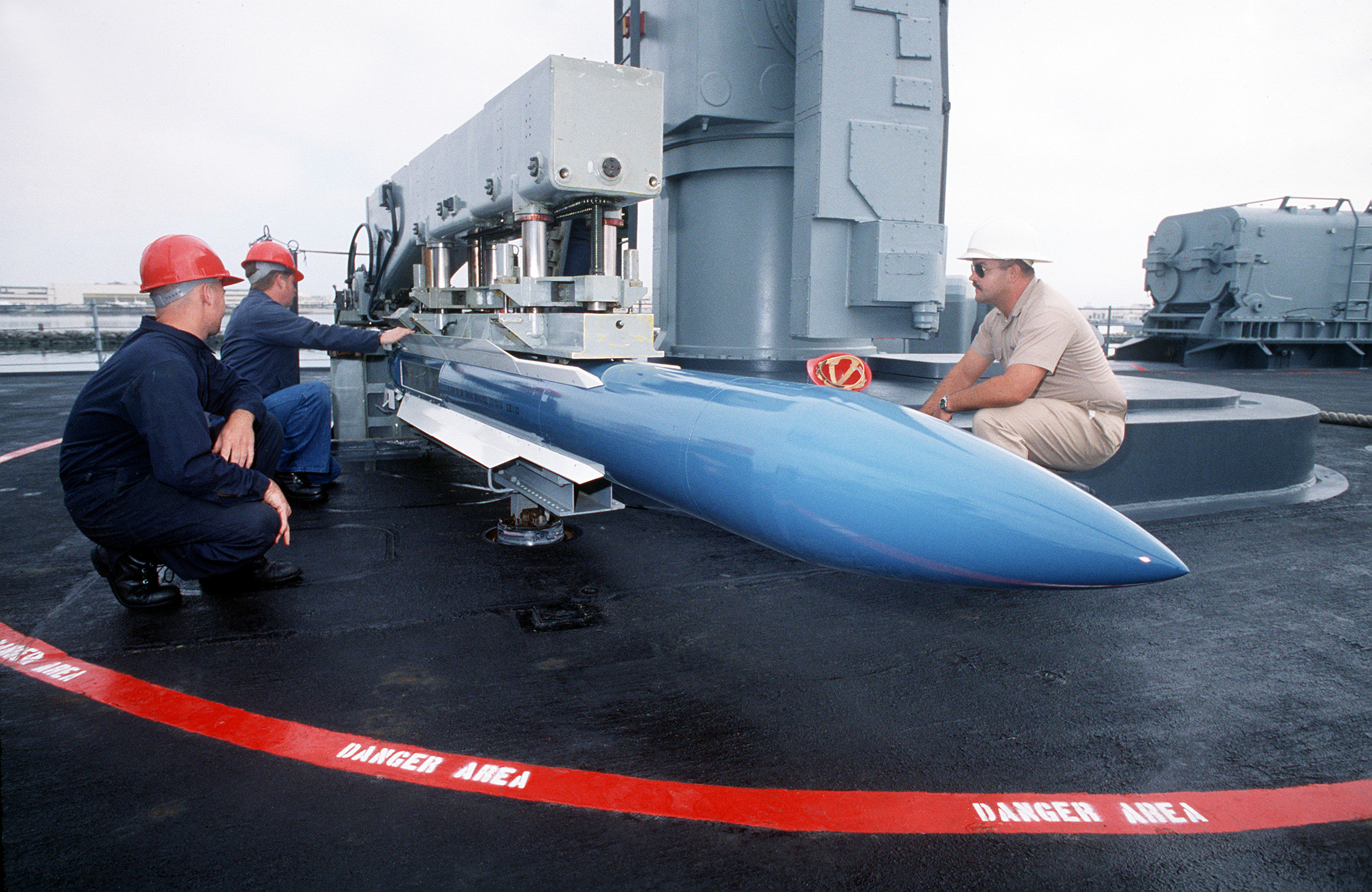
A guided missile training round being loaded into a Mark 26 launcher, USS Arkansas

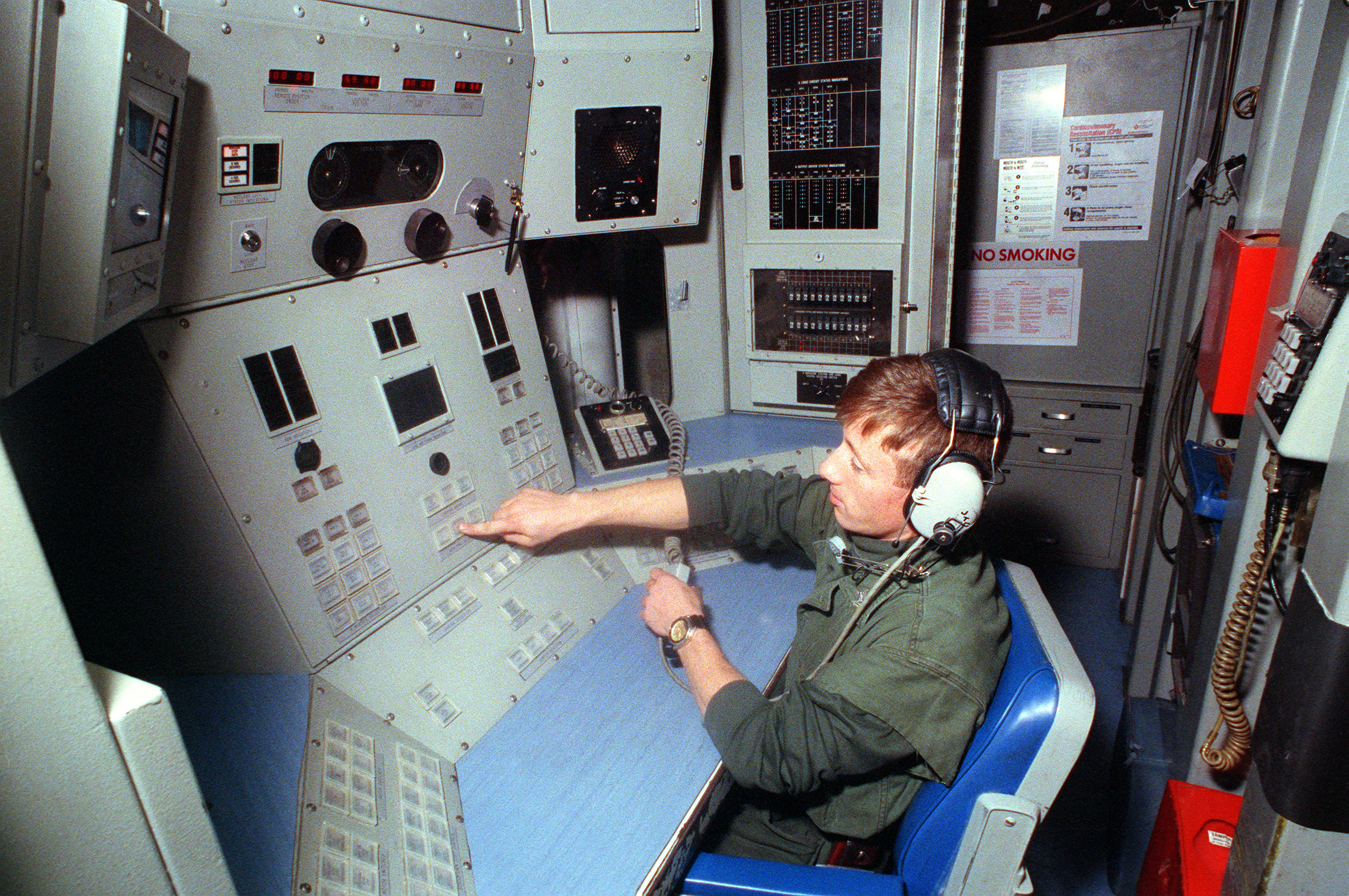
Mark 26 launch control panel, USS Ticonderoga

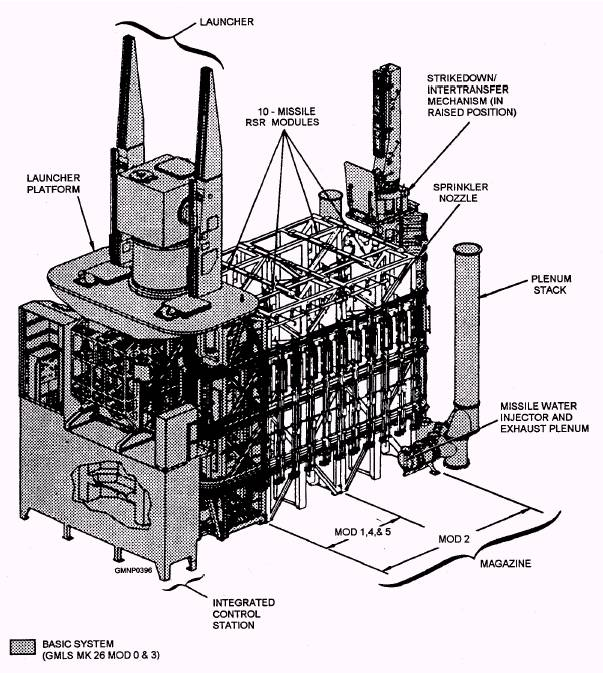
Mark 26 GMLS diagram illustrating differences between Mod versions

== See also ==
- List of United States Navy Guided Missile Launching Systems
