= AN/SPG-51 =

Fire-control radar

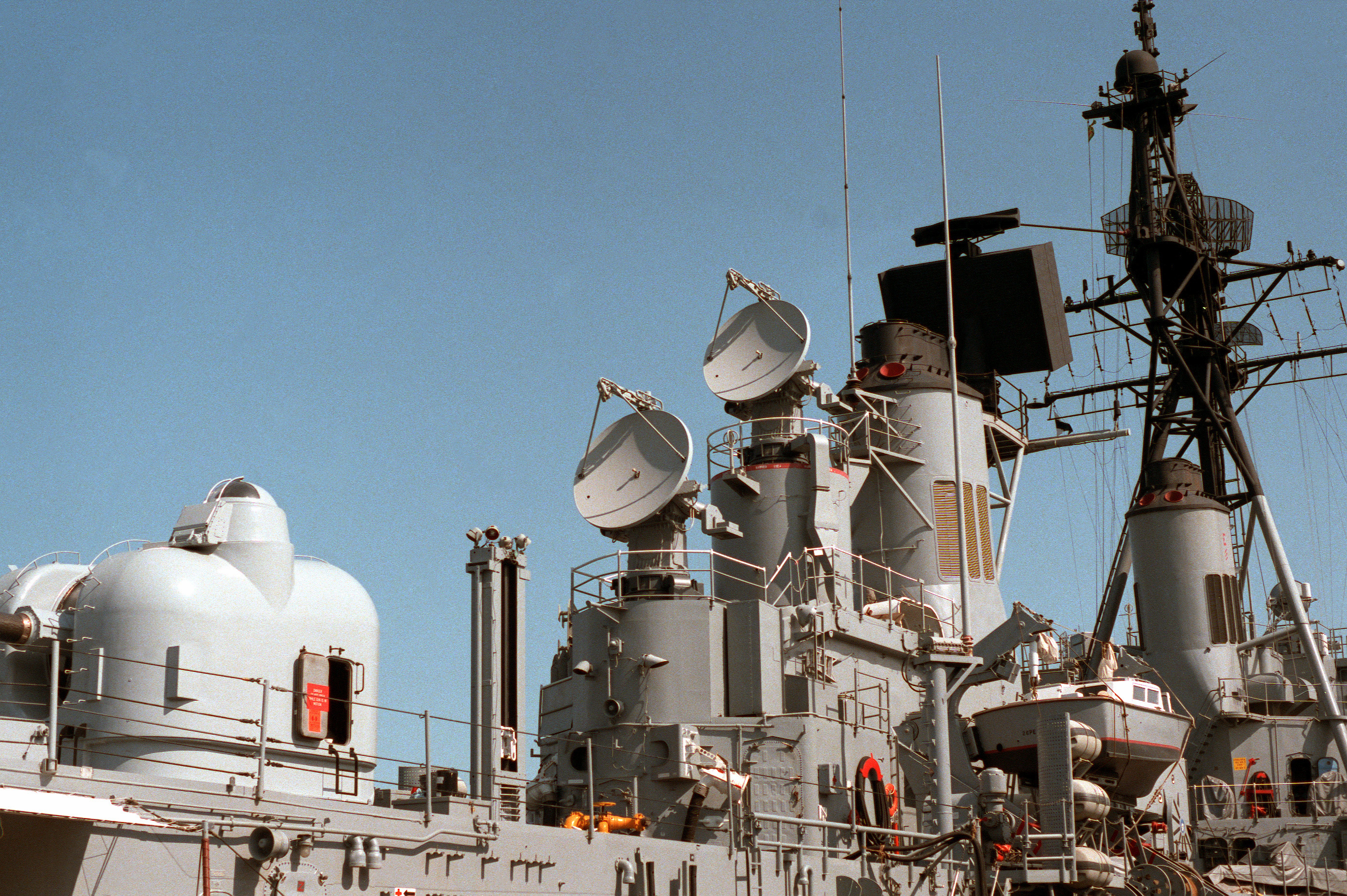
- The superstructure of the USS Richard E. Byrd (DDG-23) showing the ship's radars, 1983. There are two AN/SPG-51 directors shown directly in the center of the image.
- Country of origin: United States
- Manufacturer: Raytheon
- Type: Pulse-Doppler radar, Missile fire-control
- Frequency: Illuminator: 10.25-10.5 GHz; Tracking Radar: 5.45 GHz - 5.825 GHz (Note: All data in infobox is for SPG-51D unless otherwise stated)
- PRF: 4100 pps (surface); 9600-16700 pps (air)
- Beamwidth: Illuminator: 0.9° (horizontal), 0.9° (vertical); Tracking Radar: 1.6° (horizontal), 1.6° (vertical)
- Pulsewidth: Tracking Radar: 2.1-3.2 μs
- Range: Tracking Radar: 100 nmi (190 km)
- Azimuth: 360° at 12°/s (Note: It is uncertain as to which version of the SPG-51 this performance figure comes from.)
- Elevation: -30° to 83°
- Precision: Fire control quality three-dimensional data
- Power: Illuminator: 4000 W; Tracking Radar: 1600 W average; 81 kW peak

The AN/SPG-51 is an American tracking / illumination fire-control radar for RIM-24 Tartar and RIM-66 Standard missiles. It is used for target tracking and Surface-to-air missile guidance as part of the Mk. 73 gun and missile director system, which is part of the Tartar Guided Missile Fire Control System.

Aircraft tracking is based on monopulse radar utilizing Pulse-Doppler radar signal processing in MK 74 MOD 14 and MK 74 MOD 15. The MK 74 MOD 15 configuration includes continuous-wave radar tracking in addition to pulse-Doppler tracking. It provides illumination for bistatic radar operation associated with missile guidance in all configurations. Older systems rely on conical scanning rather than monopulse.

In accordance with the Joint Electronics Type Designation System (JETDS), the "AN/SPG-51" designation represents the 51st design of an Army-Navy electronic device for waterborne fire control radar equipment. The JETDS system also now is used to name all Department of Defense electronic systems.

== Platforms ==
=== French Navy ===
- T 47-class destroyer (Du Chayla subclass post AAW modernization)
- Cassard-class frigate

=== German Navy ===
- Lutjens-class destroyer

=== Italian Navy ===
- Audace-class destroyer
- Durand de la Penne-class destroyer
- Impavido-class destroyer

=== Japan Maritime Self-Defense Force ===
- Amatsukaze-class destroyer
- Hatakaze-class destroyer
- Tachikaze-class destroyer

=== Royal Australian Navy ===
- Perth-class destroyer

=== Royal Netherlands Navy ===
- Tromp-class frigate

=== Spanish Navy ===
- Baleares-class frigate

=== United States Navy ===
- Albany-class cruiser
- Brooke-class frigate
- California-class cruiser
- Charles F. Adams-class destroyer
- Forrest Sherman-class destroyer (DDG conversion with Tartar)
  - USS Decatur (DDG-31)
  - USS John Paul Jones (DDG-32)
  - USS Parsons (DDG-33)
  - USS Somers (DDG-34)
- Kidd-class destroyer
- Virginia-class cruiser

== Variants ==
- SPG-51: Original Model.
- SPG-51B: Upgraded SPG-51 designed for use with Improved Tartar (IT) missile.
- SPG-51C: Automatic acquisition and tracking, increased reliability, and improved ECCM capabilities, clutter rejection, and multiple target resolution.
- SPG-51D: Klystron replaced with traveling-wave tube to permit the transmission to be chosen from a much wider bandwidth. Increased use of integrated circuitry and digital circuitry.
- SPG-51E: Proposed "universal fire control radar" capable of controlling the RIM-8 Talos as well as Tartar. Not built in quantity.
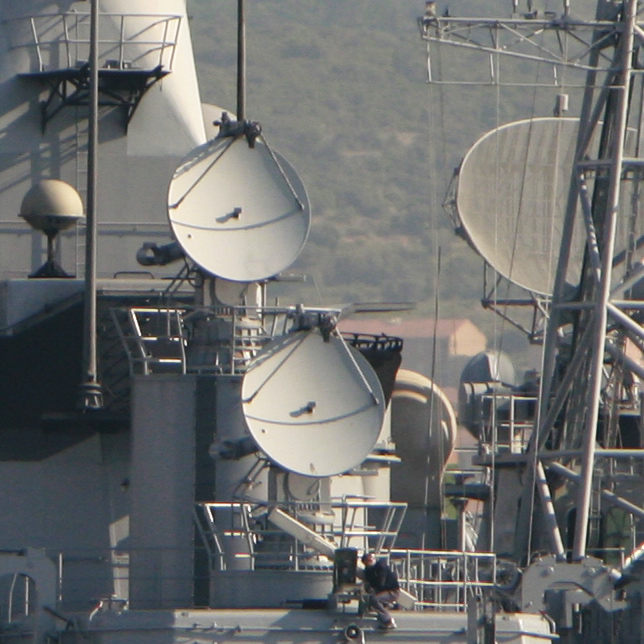
AN/SPG-51 radars of a Cassard class frigate

== See also ==
- List of radars
- List of military electronics of the United States
