= Operation Desert (disambiguation) =

Operation Desert may refer to:

Military operations

- Operation Desert (German fuel project), a project established in June 1944 by Nazi Germany
- Operation Desert Badger, a U.S. response plan if a pilot was shot down while patrolling the Iraqi no-fly zones
- Operation Desert Farewell, the return of American units and equipment to the United States in 1991 after the liberation of Kuwait
- Operation Desert Fox, December 1998 bombing of Iraq
- Operation Desert Hawk, 1965 Pakistani military operation against India in the Rann of Kutch
- Operation Desert Lion, an operation of the U.S. 505th Parachute Infantry Regiment and 82nd Airborne Division in Afghanistan
- Operation Desert Scorpion (Iraq 2003), a military operation launched during the 2003 invasion of Iraq
- Operation Desert Shield (Iraq), a 2006 operation by the Iraqi insurgency
- Operation Desert Shield, a defensive mission to prevent Iraq from invading Saudi Arabia
- Operation Desert Snowplough, a codename for Danish operations under British command in Iraq
- Operation Desert Spider, an interrogation of Saddam Hussein
- Operation Desert Spring, an ongoing operation in Kuwait
- Operation Desert Storm, a codename of the Gulf War
- Operation Desert Strike, cruise missile strikes on Iraq
- Operation Desert Thrust, the name of the First Brigade 1st Infantry Division's operations in Iraq

Video games

- Operation: Desert Storm (video game) (1991)
- Gulf War: Operation Desert Hammer, a 1999 video game
