= Carl Jerrold Peterson =

US Navy Lieutenant Commander

Carl J. Peterson
- Born: Carl Jerrold Peterson; 31 October 1936; Tuxedo Park, New York, US
- Died: 2 April 1969 (aged 32); Tây Ninh Province, South Vietnam
- Burial place: Arlington National Cemetery
- Military career
- Allegiance: United States of America
- Branch: United States Navy
- Service years: 1958–1969
- Rank: Lieutenant Commander
- Service number: 624901
- Units: USS McCaffery; USS Arneb; USS Ogden
- Commands: Patrol River Boat Squadron 57
- Conflicts: Vietnam War †; Operation Game Warden
- Awards: Bronze Star Medal Navy Commendation Medal

Carl Jerrold Peterson (31 October 1936 – 2 April 1969) was a United States Navy Lieutenant Commander and the commanding officer of Patrol River Boat Squadron 57. He was killed in action in Vietnam and buried in Arlington National Cemetery. In 1975, the United States Navy named the USS Peterson in his memory.

== Biography ==
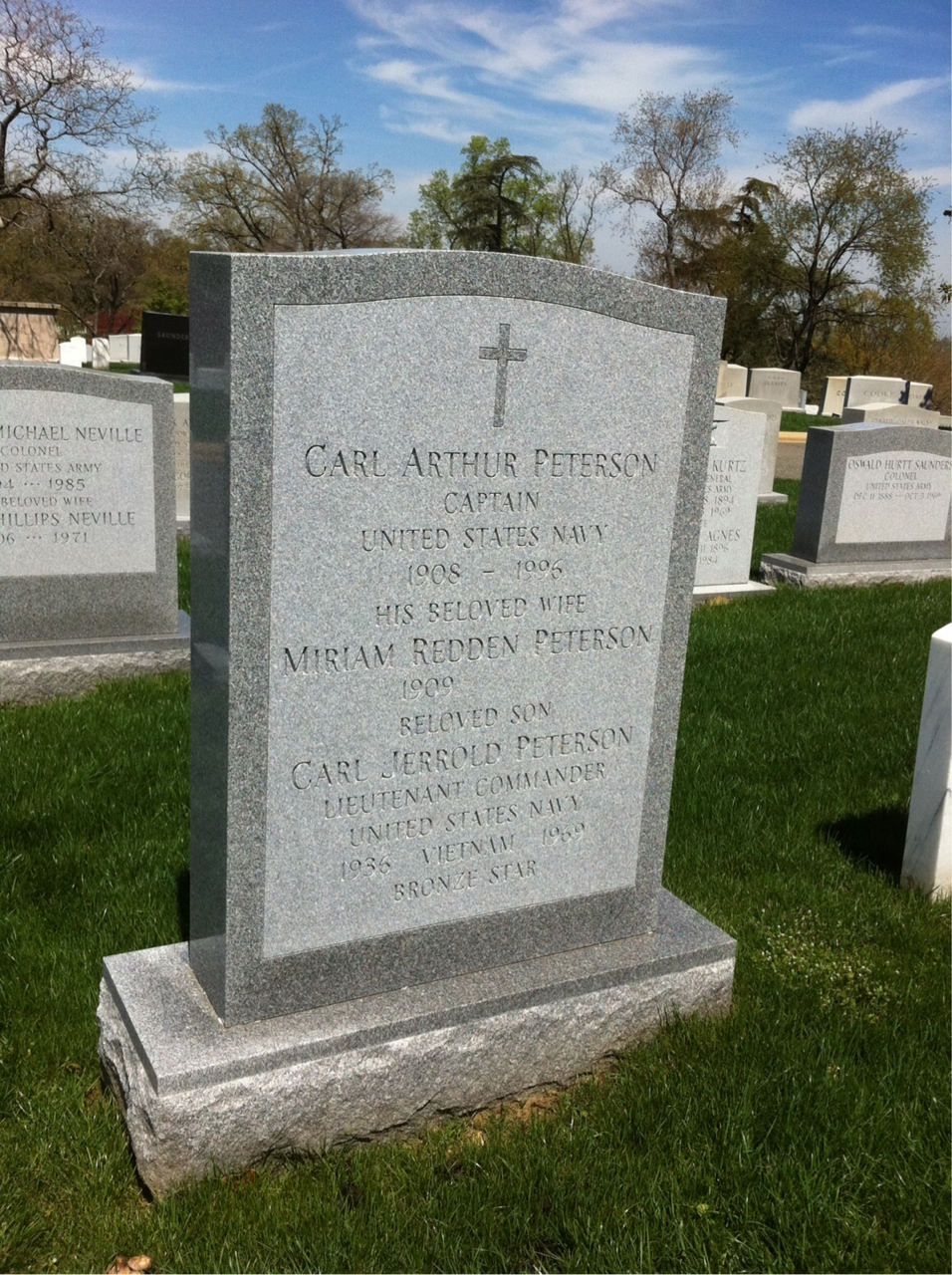
Grave at Arlington National Cemetery

Carl Jerrold Peterson was born 31 October 1936 to Captain Carl A. Peterson, USN, Ret. (1908 – 1996) of Tuxedo Park, New York and Miriam C. Redden-Peterson (1909 – 2010), daughter of Connecticut State senator William A. Redden. He received a Bachelor of Science degree from the United States Naval Academy and was commissioned an Ensign in June 1958. According to his Academy Yearbook and the Bridgeport Post, he was from Bridgeport, Connecticut and lived at 388 Midland for much of his youth. He was said to "play a mean attack on the lacrosse field" and he was a valuable member of the crew of the USNA's yacht, Freedom.

Lieutenant Commander Peterson then served successive tours at sea in USS McCaffery and USS Arneb. In 1962, he was assigned to the office of the Chief of Naval Operations, and in 1964 to the staff of Commander Middle East Force. From 1966 to 1968 Lieutenant Commander Peterson served as Operations Officer aboard USS Ogden and participated in eight major amphibious assaults against enemy forces in Vietnam. Lieutenant Commander Peterson was credited with developing the command and control techniques for debarking troops simultaneously by air and sea amphibious transports successfully employed in these assaults.

In December 1968, Lieutenant Commander Peterson volunteered for duties in Vietnam and subsequently commanded Patrol River Boat Squadron 57 operating in the waterways of the Mekong Delta. According to the US Navy, Carl Peterson was singularly responsible for the success of many joint quick reaction operations designed to draw out and destroy enemy forces. On 2 April 1969, while embarked in an assault support patrol boat transiting the Vàm Cỏ Đông River to his command center in USS Harnett County, Lieutenant Commander Peterson was mortally wounded when an enemy rocket detonated against his vessel.

He was buried at Arlington National Cemetery.

== Awards and honors ==
His awards include the Bronze Star Medal with Combat Distinguishing Device (awarded posthumously) and the Navy Commendation Medal with Combat Distinguishing Device. USS Peterson was named in his honor. His name is listed on the Vietnam Veterans Memorial Panel 27W, Row 1.
