= 1996 cruise missile strikes on Iraq =

1996 military operation

Operation Desert Strike
- Part of the Iraqi no-fly zones conflict and the Iraqi Kurdish Civil War
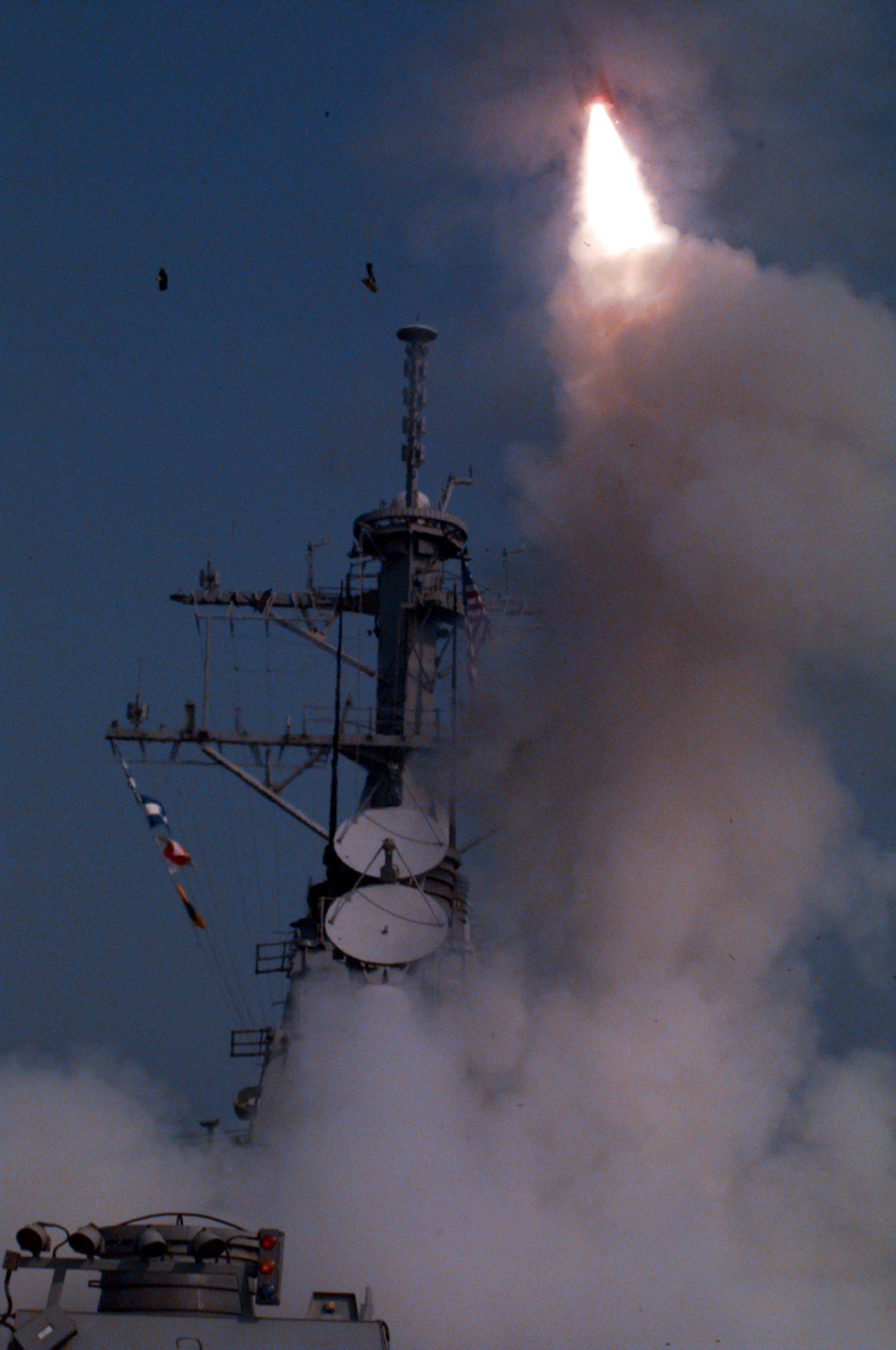
- USS Laboon launches Tomahawk cruise missiles at Iraqi air defense targets, 3 September 1996.
- Type: Cruise missile strikes
- Location: Southern Iraq
- Planned by: United States
- Target: Air defense targets in southern Iraq
- Date: 3 September 1996; 29 years ago
- Executed by: United States Navy; United States Air Force
- Outcome: See Aftermath section

The 1996 cruise missile strikes on Iraq, codenamed Operation Desert Strike, were joint United States Navy–United States Air Force strikes conducted on 3 September against air defense targets in southern Iraq, in response to an Iraqi offensive in the Kurdish Civil War.

== Iraqi offensive ==
On 31 August 1996, the Iraqi military launched its biggest offensive since 1991 against the city of Erbil in to defuse the Kurdish Civil War between the Patriotic Union of Kurdistan and Kurdistan Democratic Party. This attack stoked American fears and placed Iraqi president Saddam Hussein in clear violation of United Nations Security Council Resolution 688 forbidding repression of Iraq's ethnic minorities.

== Cruise missile strikes ==
The strikes were initially planned to be by aircraft launched from the aircraft carrier USS Carl Vinson, including aircraft from Fighter Squadron 11 (VF-11) and Fighter Squadron 31 (VF-31), both operating F-14D Tomcats; Electronic Attack Squadron 139 (VAQ-139), operating EA-6B Prowlers; Attack Squadron 196 (VA-196), operating A-6E SWIP Intruders equipped with the Target Recognition and Attack Multi-Sensor (TRAM) system; Anti-Submarine Squadron 35 (VS-35) flying S-3B Vikings; and Strike Fighter Squadron 113 (VFA-113) and Strike Fighter Squadron 25 (VFA-25), both operating F/A-18C Hornets. However the strike was instead launched by U.S. Navy surface warships and U.S. Air Force (USAF) bombers, using cruise missiles.

On 3 September 1996, a joint operation by the U.S. Navy's Carl Vinson Carrier Battle Group and the USAF, a combined strike team consisting of the guided-missile cruiser USS Shiloh, the guided-missile destroyer USS Laboon, and B-52 Stratofortress bombers escorted by F-14D Tomcat fighters from Carl Vinson, with the nuclear-powered guided-missile cruiser USS California serving as Air Warfare Commander, launched 27 cruise missiles against Iraqi air defense targets in southern Iraq. A second wave of 17 missiles was launched later that day from the destroyers USS Russell, USS Hewitt, USS Laboon, and the nuclear-powered attack submarine USS Jefferson City. The missiles hit targets in and around Kut, Iskandariyah, Nasiriyah, and Tallil.

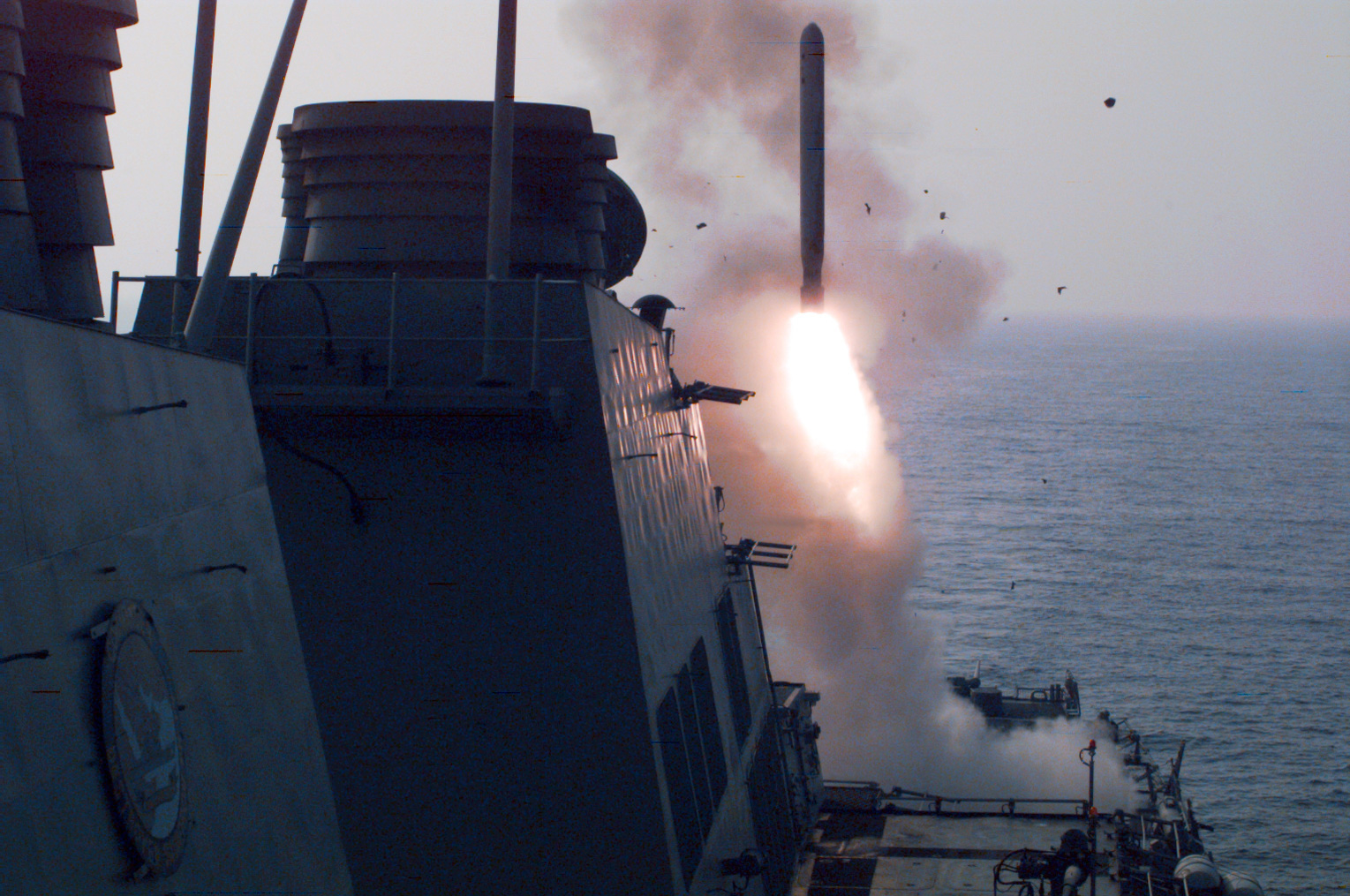
The USS Laboon fires a Tomahawk missile at Iraq in September 1996.

== Aftermath ==
It is debatable whether the attacks did or did not have a substantial effect on Iraq's northern campaign. Once they installed the Kurdistan Democratic Party (KDP) in control of Irbil, Iraqi troops withdrew from the Kurdish region back to their initial positions. The KDP drove the Patriotic Union of Kurdistan (PUK) from its other strongholds, and with additional Iraqi help, captured Sulaymaniyah. The PUK and its leader, Jalal Talabani, retreated to the border, and U.S. forces evacuated 700 Iraqi National Congress personnel and 6,000 pro-Western Kurds out of northern Iraq.

In response to Iraq's moves, the United States and United Kingdom also expanded Operation Southern Watch and the southern Iraqi no-fly zones from the 32nd parallel to the 33rd parallel, bringing it to the edges of Baghdad itself.

== See also ==
- January 1993 airstrikes on Iraq
- 1993 cruise missile strikes on Iraq
- 1998 bombing of Iraq
- February 2001 airstrike in Iraq
