= 1993 cruise missile strikes on Iraq =

United States airstrike on Iraq in June 1993

- Part of the Iraqi no-fly zones conflict
- Type: Cruise missile strikes
- Locations: Persian Gulf; Red Sea
- Planned by: United States
- Target: Headquarters of the Iraqi Intelligence Service in the Mansour district of Baghdad
- Date: June 27, 1993
- Executed by: USS Peterson; USS Chancellorsville
- Outcome: Intelligence headquarters in Baghdad destroyed
- Casualties: 9 civilians killed (Iraqi sources)

Iraq was attacked with cruise missiles by the United States in June 1993. The strikes were ordered by U.S. president Bill Clinton as both a retaliation and a warning triggered by the attempted assassination of his predecessor George H. W. Bush by alleged Iraqi intelligence agents while on a visit to Kuwait from 14–16 April 1993.

On June 27, 1993, 23 Tomahawk cruise missiles were launched by a cruiser and a destroyer of the U.S. Navy into downtown Baghdad. These hit a building which was believed to be the headquarters of the Iraqi Intelligence Service in the Mansour district of Baghdad. Iraq claimed that nine civilians were killed in the attack and three civilian houses destroyed.

== George H. W. Bush assassination plot ==
On the night of 13 April 1993, a day before George H. W. Bush was scheduled to visit Kuwait City to commemorate the international coalition victory against Iraq in the Persian Gulf War, Kuwaiti authorities arrested 14 people suspected of involvement in a plot to kill Bush using explosives hidden in a Toyota Landcruiser.

The Kuwaitis recovered the Landcruiser, which contained between 80 and 90 kilograms of plastic explosives, composed mostly of RDX, connected to a detonator (called the "Bush device" in an FBI laboratory report). They also recovered ten cube-shaped plastic explosive devices with detonators (called "cube bombs" in an FBI laboratory report) from the Landcruiser.

Investigators from the FBI, Secret Service, and other agencies traveled to Kuwait immediately after the arrests were made public. The Clinton administration said it would consider action against Iraq if it had positive proof of Iraqi complicity in an assassination attempt.

=== Responsible party ===
Clinton was convinced the attack was masterminded by the Iraqi Intelligence Service by three pieces of evidence. First, the suspects in the plot made detailed confessions to FBI agents in Kuwait, including two alleged leaders of the plot, Ra'ad Asadi and Wali Abdelhadi Ghazali, both of whom were Iraqi nationals. Asadi stated that he was responsible for directing the car bomb, while Ghazali said that he would have been responsible for detonating the bomb to kill Bush. Second, FBI bomb experts linked the captured 175-pound car bomb found in Kuwait City to previous explosives made in Iraq. Third, intelligence assessments noted that Iraqi President Saddam Hussein had publicly threatened Bush, including promising to hunt down and punish Bush on Iraqi official media, even after Bush left office. The Clinton administration had also promised that it would punish Iraq if the individuals accused in the assassination plot were found guilty of acting on orders from Iraq. At least two of the defendants had pleaded guilty in early June 1993, prior to the missile strike. Both of them stated in court that they had been recruited by men they believed to be Iraqi intelligence agents, and had driven the explosive-laden Toyota from Iraq to Kuwait.

An analysis by the CIA's Counterterrorism Mission Center from May 13, 1993 claimed that Kuwaiti authorities possibly "cooked the books" on the assassination plot. CIA analysts stated that the Kuwaiti government may have used the discovery of an unrelated Iraqi weapons smuggling plot to project a plot against Bush. They noted that some of the evidence, including explosive devices matching those used in Iraqi operations, definitely pointed to Iraqi involvement. However, they were unable to corroborate the Kuwaiti assertion that the plot was aimed at Bush. US officials described the report as an "interim report" and suggested subsequent FBI operations left open the possibility that there had indeed been an Iraqi plot on Bush's life. In October 1993, New Yorker investigative journalist Seymour Hersh assailed the U.S. government's case as "seriously flawed". He noted that seven experts in electronic engineering and explosives who saw photographs of the explosive device in Kuwait and a known Iraqi device told him that "both were generic equipment without unique characteristics." Hersh also said that some of the suspected bombers disavowed their confessions and claimed that they had been beaten.

In 1993, trials began for the men accused in the assassination plot. In 1994, ten Iraqis and three Kuwaitis were sentenced for their roles in the plot, including five Iraqis and one Kuwaiti who were sentenced to death. One defendant was acquitted during the trial. Ghazali was one of the defendants to plead guilty and was one of the individuals sentenced to death. He stated after his sentencing that he attempted to assassinate Bush as revenge for the Persian Gulf War and his family, claiming that 16 family members were killed by Bush's actions. Another defendant who plead guilty stated that he was motivated to join the operation for payment. In March 1995, Kuwait's top appeals court upheld two of the death sentences, while commuting the death sentences for three Iraqis to life imprisonment and setting aside the death penalty conviction of one Kuwaiti for a lower charge resulting in five years imprisonment.

== Cruise missile attack on Baghdad ==
Pres. Clinton's Address on Iraq (1993)

Between 1:00 am and 2:00 am local time on 26 June/June 27, 1993, 23 Tomahawk cruise missiles were launched by two U.S. Navy warships into downtown Baghdad. These hit a building which was believed to be the headquarters of the Iraqi Intelligence Service in the Mansour district of Baghdad. Iraq claimed that nine civilians were killed in the attack and three civilian houses destroyed. The missiles were fired from the destroyer USS Peterson in the Red Sea and the cruiser USS Chancellorsville in the Persian Gulf.

U.S. Secretary of Defense Les Aspin, stated in a June 27, 1993, interview with The Washington Post:

What we're doing is sending a message against the people who were responsible for planning this operation ... [If] anybody asks the same people to do it again, they will remember this message.

== See also ==
- January 1993 airstrikes on Iraq
- 1996 cruise missile strikes on Iraq
- 1998 bombing of Iraq
- Operation Infinite Reach
