= February 2001 airstrike in Iraq =

- Part of Iraqi no-fly zones conflict
- Type: Missile attacks
- Location: Taji radar site 33.533°N 44.234°E
- Planned by: United States; United Kingdom
- Date: February 16, 2001
- Executed by: United States Air Force; Royal Air Force
- Casualties: 3 civilians killed 25 injured injured

On February 16, 2001, U.S. President George W. Bush ordered airstrikes on five military targets near the Iraqi capital of Baghdad. The strikes came in response to imminent Iraqi threats to aircraft patrolling the no-fly zones. Many countries, including U.S. allies, have condemned the airstrikes, which they have called illegal. The United States Armed Forces said the bombing was essentially a self-defense operation, due to the increased frequency and enhanced capabilities of Iraqi air defense systems. It was President Bush's first military action since taking office.

== Background ==
U.S. and British officials base the no-fly zones on UN Security Council Resolution 688, which demands that Iraq end the oppression of its population, and on the ceasefire agreement after the Gulf War that prevent Iraq from interfering in allied air operations over Iraq.

== Reactions ==
Iraq described the act as an "aggression and a unilateral use of force against the sovereignty of an independent state." Iraqi President Saddam Hussein chaired a meeting of the Revolutionary Command Council and the Regional Command of the Arab Socialist Ba'ath Party. According to the Iraqi News Agency, the meeting was convened to discuss and follow up on "the military measures that must be taken in response to the United States and to those who facilitate its actions in the event of renewed aggression."

In a statement released after the meeting, the Iraqi leadership expressed its determination to confront the United States, describing the attack as part of a "Zionist conspiracy." The statement declared: "We will fight them in the air, at sea, and on land, and their aggression will end in failure."

The statement also attributed responsibility to Saudi Arabia and Kuwait, accusing them of allowing their territories to be used as launching pads for American and British fighter aircraft.

A Kuwaiti official said his country "neither permits nor condemns the strikes". Egypt, Saudi Arabia, Jordan and Turkey have expressed levels of opposition to the bombing. The U.S. president, speaking from Mexico during a meeting with President Vicente Fox, described the bombing as a "routine mission to enforce the no-fly zone". "It was a task that I was informed of and authorized, but I repeat, it's a routine mission." In London, British Prime Minister Tony Blair's office said Defense Secretary Geoff Hoon authorized the raids earlier this week after discussions with the United States.
