= Iraqi no-fly zones conflict =

No-fly zones in Iraq proclaimed by the USA, UK and France between 1991–2003

Iraqi no-fly zones
- Part of the lead-up to the Iraq War
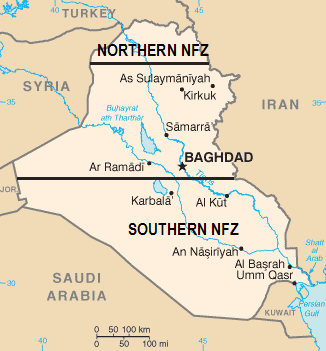
- No-fly zones boundaries as they were from 1996 to 2003
Date	1 March 1991 – 20 March 2003 (12 years, 2 weeks and 5 days)
Location	Iraq
Result	Subsumed by the beginning of the 2003 invasion of Iraq

Belligerents
United States; United Kingdom; France (until 1998); Turkey; Saudi Arabia (Operation Southern Watch); Australia (Operation Habitat) (1991); Operation Provide Comfort/Provide Comfort II: Peshmerga; Germany; Netherlands; Italy; Spain; Portugal	Iraq

Commanders and leaders
George H. W. Bush (until 20 January 1993); Bill Clinton (until 20 January 2001); George W. Bush (until 20 March 2003); John Shalikashvili (until 1997); Hugh Shelton (until 2001); T. Michael Moseley; John Major (until 2 May 1997); Tony Blair (until 20 March 2003); François Mitterrand (until 17 May 1995); Jacques Chirac (until 15 December 1998); King Fahd; Prince Abdullah	(Iraq) Saddam Hussein

Strength
6,000 infantrymen 50 aircraft and 1,400 personnel at any one time	Unknown number of Iraqi Air Force personnel and Iraqi Police officers

Casualties and losses
2 UH-60 Blackhawk helicopters shot down (friendly fire, 26 killed); 19 USAF personnel deployed as part of the operation killed in the Khobar Towers Bombing; 5 RQ-1 Predator unmanned aircraft shot down	Unknown number of soldiers killed Unknown number of air defense systems destroyed 1 MiG-25 Foxbat shot down 1 MiG-23 Flogger shot down 2 Su-22 Fitters shot down
- 315 Iraqi civilians killed, 965 wounded (up to March 2001) (Iraqi government claim)

The Iraqi no-fly zones conflict was a low-level conflict in the two no-fly zones (NFZs) in Iraq that were proclaimed by the United States, United Kingdom, and France after the Gulf War of 1991. The United States stated that the NFZs were intended to protect the ethnic Kurdish minority in northern Iraq and Shiite Muslims in the south. Iraqi aircraft were forbidden from flying inside the zones. The policy was enforced by the United States and the United Kingdom until 2003, when it was rendered obsolete by the 2003 invasion of Iraq. French aircraft patrols also participated until France withdrew in 1996 from involvement in the northern zone, and in 1998 altogether.

The Iraqi government claimed 1,400 civilians were killed by Coalition bombing during the NFZ. The Kurdish-inhabited north gained effective autonomy and was protected from a feared repeat of the Anfal genocide in 1988 that killed tens of thousands of civilians. Over 280,000 sorties were flown in the first nine years of the NFZs.

== History ==
From 1992 to the United States-led coalition invasion of Iraq in 2003, there were two NFZs in Iraq. The NFZ in the north of Iraq was established shortly after the Gulf War, extending from the 36th parallel northwards. In August 1992 the NFZ in the south to the 32nd parallel was established, but in 1996 it was expanded to the 33rd parallel. The northern NFZ was initially part of Operation Provide Comfort relief operations to a persecuted Kurdish minority in Iraq, and was followed on by Operation Northern Watch. The southern NFZ was maintained by Operation Southern Watch.

When Operation Desert Storm ended in 1991, the safety of Kurds who were fleeing during the uprising from Iraqi persecution became an issue, and Operation Provide Comfort began. This operation essentially created a Northern NFZ to Iraqi military aircraft. The operation provided the Kurdish population with humanitarian aid and reassurance of safe skies.

On 26 June 1993, the U.S. conducted a cruise missile attack on the Iraqi Intelligence Service's principal command and control complex in Baghdad. The U.S. public justification was retaliation for Iraqi Intelligence's assassination attempt on former president George H. W. Bush while he was visiting Kuwait in April of that year to commemorate a coalition victory over Iraq in the Gulf War. Fourteen cruise missiles were launched from USS Peterson and nine of them launched from USS Chancellorsville. Sixteen hit the target, while three struck a residential area, killing nine civilians and wounding 12 others. Four missiles were unaccounted for.

In October 1994, Baghdad once again began mobilizing around 64,000 Iraqi troops near the Kuwaiti border because of their expressed frustrations of economic sanctions imposed on Iraq by the United Nations Security Council. In response, the U.S. begins to deploy troops in the Persian Gulf to deter Iraqi aggression against Kuwait. Code-named Operation Vigilant Warrior, the 1st Brigade of the Fort Stewart, Georgia-based 24th Infantry Division (Mechanized) deployed and drew pre-positioned equipment in Kuwait. The 75th Fighter Squadron of the 23rd Wing and its Fairchild Republic A-10 Thunderbolt IIs were also sent. They initially deployed from Pope AFB, North Carolina to King Abdulaziz Air Base, Dhahran, Saudi Arabia, followed by the first forward deployment to Ahmad al-Jaber Air Base, Kuwait. This allowed better face-to-face coordination with forward air controllers further forward in Kuwait. After the U.S. brigade deployed, Iraq withdrew its troops from the border.

On 14 April 1994, two United States Air Force F-15 Eagle fighter planes mistakenly shot down two United States Army UH-60 Black Hawk helicopters, killing 26 U.S. military and civilian personnel.

In September 1996, the U.S. conducted Operation Desert Strike, and ships from the USS Carl Vinson Battle Group, including USS Laboon, and USS Shiloh, in conjunction with B-52 bombers escorted by F-14D Tomcats from USS Carl Vinson, launched 27 cruise missiles against Iraqi air defense targets in southern Iraq. A second wave of 17 was launched later that day. The missiles hit targets in and around Kut, Iskandariyah, Nasiriyah, and Tallil. This was done in response to Saddam Hussein, the dictator of Iraq, attempting to launch an Iraqi military offensive campaign in the Kurdish town of Arbil in Iraqi Kurdistan. The southern no-fly zone was simultaneously expanded northward to the 33rd parallel. France rejected the expansion, stating that Iraq had not violated U.N. frameworks by deploying its forces, reportedly at the request of a Kurdish faction.

Operation Provide Comfort officially ended on 31 December 1996. Following Operation Provide Comfort, the United States continued to watch over the northern skies with the launching of Operation Northern Watch on 1 January 1997. Operation Northern Watch continued to provide air security to the Kurdish population in the north. By 1999, the Department of Defense had flown over 200,000 sorties over Iraq.

American and British aircraft continuously enforced the NFZ, receiving anti-aircraft fire from Iraqi forces almost daily. The operation ran until its conclusion on 1 May 2003. In the south, Operation Southern Watch was underway to watch over the persecuted Shi'ite populations. This operation was launched on 27 August 1992 with the mission of preventing further human rights abuses against civilian populations. Iraq challenged the no-fly zone beginning in December 1992 when a USAF F-16 fighter plane shot down an Iraqi MiG-25 Foxbat fighter which had locked onto it in the Southern no-fly zone. The next month Coalition planes attacked Iraqi SAM sites in the South. Baghdad eventually halted firing on patrolling Coalition aircraft after August 1993.

In December 1998, Operation Desert Fox was conducted by the USAF and the Royal Air Force, which was a major four-day bombing campaign on Iraqi targets from 16 December to 19 December 1998. The contemporaneous justification for the strikes was Iraq's failure to comply with United Nations Security Council resolutions and its interference with United Nations Special Commission inspectors.

In the aftermath of Operation Desert Fox in December 1998, Iraq announced it would no longer respect the no-fly zones and resumed its efforts in shooting down Coalition aircraft. Saddam Hussein offered a $14,000 reward to anyone who could accomplish this task, but no manned aircraft were ever shot down by Iraq. Air strikes by British and American aircraft against Iraqi claimed anti-aircraft and military targets continued weekly over the next few years. In the early 2000s (decade), the U.S. developed a contingency plan, Operation Desert Badger for dealing with pilots shot down over Iraqi no-fly zones.

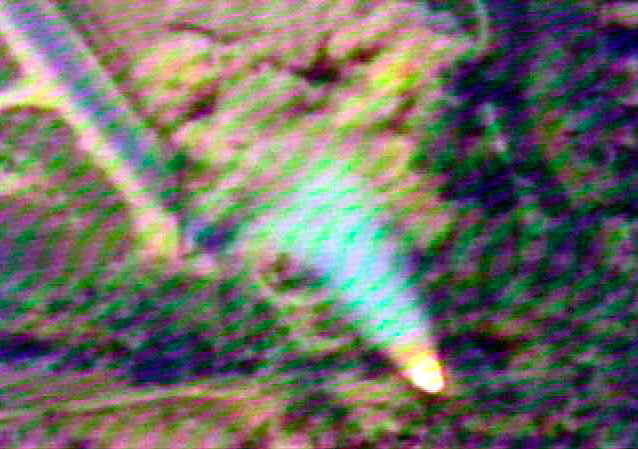
Still photograph from a videotape of an Iraqi surface-to-air missile, believed to be an SA-3, launched at a Coalition aircraft in July 2001.

The operation continued until it transitioned to Operation Southern Focus in June 2002. They began to carry out offensive sorties, not only against targets that had fired on them, but upon installations that had demonstrated no hostile intent. The U.S. claimed that these increased attacks were the result of increasing Iraqi provocations, but later, in July 2005, the British Ministry of Defense released figures showing that the number of provocations had actually dropped dramatically prior to and just after the increase in allied attacks. Their records indicate that in the first seven months of 2001, there had been 370 provocations on the part of Iraq. In the seven months from October 2001 into May 2002, only 32 such provocations were recorded. General Tommy Franks later acknowledged that the dramatic increase in offensive sorties was an attempt to destroy the Iraqi defenses in much the same way as the air strikes at the beginning of the Gulf War had.

In purported retaliation for the Iraqis' now-daily air defense attacks on Coalition aircraft, the September attacks included a 5 September 100-aircraft attack on the main air defense site in western Iraq. According to an editorial by Michael Smith for the New Statesman, this was "Located at the furthest extreme of the southern no-fly zone, far away from the areas that needed to be patrolled to prevent attacks on the Shi'a; it was destroyed not because it was a threat to the patrols, but to allow allied special forces operating from Jordan to enter Iraq undetected."

The NFZs effectively ceased to exist with the beginning of the Iraq War in March 2003, since air superiority over the country was quickly attained by the coalition. The NFZs were officially deactivated right after Saddam Hussein's overthrow.

== Legality ==
Neither the No-Fly Zones nor the aerial bombing which enforced them were authorised by the United Nations. The Secretary-General of the United Nations at the time the resolution was passed, Boutros Boutros-Ghali, called the no-fly zones "illegal" in a later interview with John Pilger.

The American, British and French governments justified the no-fly zones by invoking United Nations Security Council Resolution 688, though the resolution made no explicit reference to no-fly zones.

== Role in preparation for ground invasion ==
From March to December 2002 the number of bombs dropped increased by 300%. This was recognised as "a clear indication that the no-fly zone is being used to destroy the country's air defence systems in anticipation of an all-out attack". Whitehall officials privately admitted to the Guardian that the no-fly zones were being used to weaken Iraq's air defence systems instead of the stated aim of defending the Marsh Arabs and the Shia population of Iraq.

The commander of the USS Abraham Lincoln's air wing said that the NFZ "makes any potential action infinitely easier ... to fly over the same territory you're going to attack is a real luxury".

== Civilian deaths ==
The United Nations reported that in 1999 alone 144 civilians were killed during Coalition bombing raids. By 1999 over 1,800 bombs had been dropped on Iraq, while Iraq stated that 1,400 civilians died due to bombing during the NFZ.

== See also ==
- Iraqi Airways
- Iraq sanctions
- Post–World War II air-to-air combat losses
