= USS Peterson (DD-969) =

Spruance-class destroyer

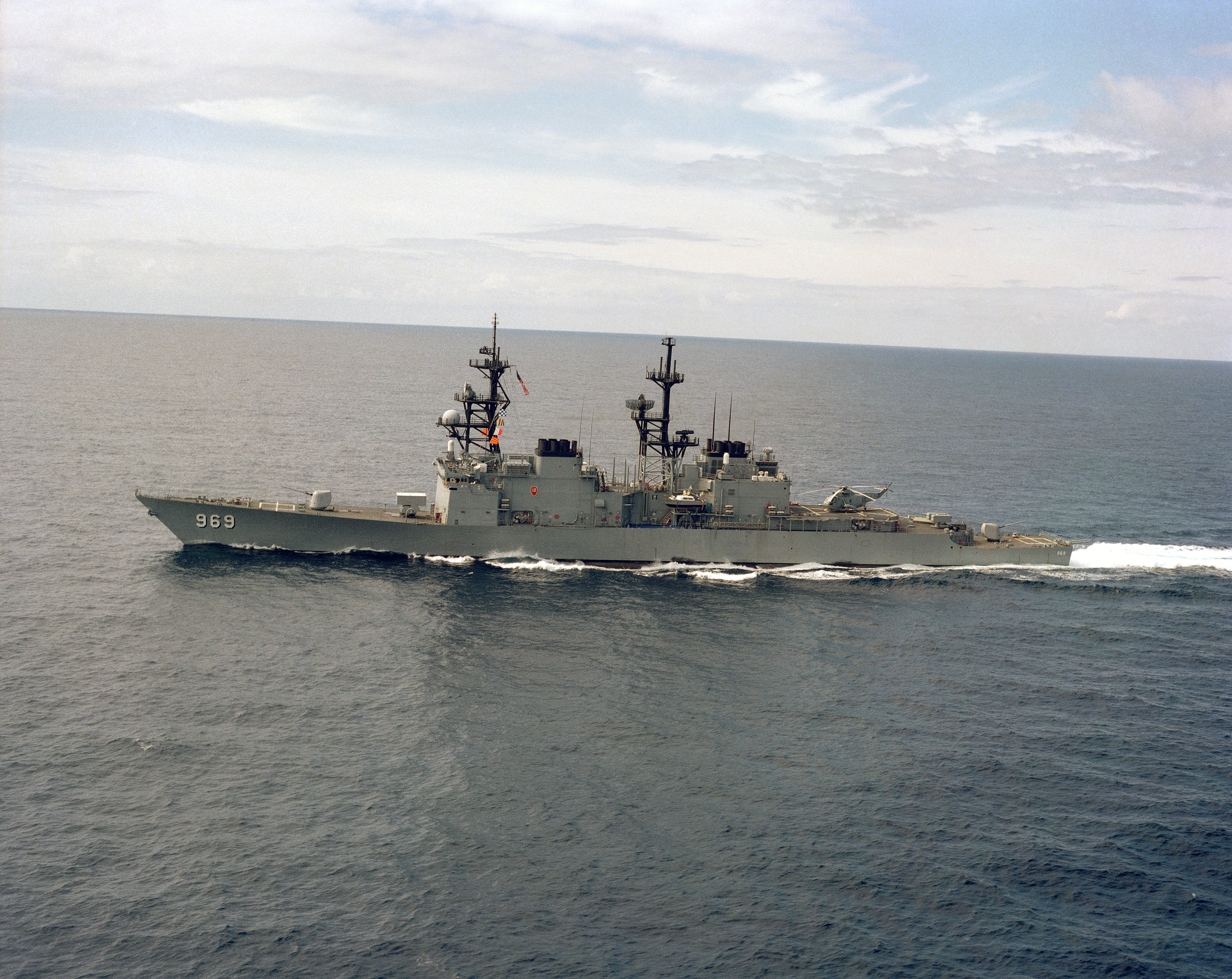
- USS Peterson underway, 12 March 1988

History

United States
- Name: Peterson
- Namesake: Carl Jerrold Peterson
- Ordered: 15 January 1971
- Builder: Ingalls Shipbuilding
- Laid down: 29 April 1974
- Launched: 21 June 1975
- Sponsored by: Mrs. Miriam C. Peterson
- Acquired: 13 June 1977
- Commissioned: 9 July 1977
- Decommissioned: 4 October 2002
- In service: 1977
- Out of service: 2002
- Stricken: 6 November 2002
- Identification: Callsign: NGHY; Hull number: DDG-969
- Motto: Proud Tradition
- Nickname(s): Proud Pete
- Fate: Sunk as target, 16 February 2004
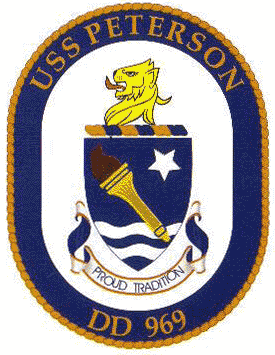
- Badge

General characteristics
- Class & type: Spruance-class destroyer
- Displacement: 8,040 long tons (8,170 t) full load
- Length: 529 ft (161 m) waterline; 563 ft (172 m) overall
- Beam: 55 ft (17 m)
- Draft: 29 ft (8.8 m)
- Installed power: 3 × 501-K17 generator sets (2,000 kW (2,700 hp) each)
- Propulsion: 4 × General Electric LM2500 gas turbines, 2 shafts, 80,000 shp (60 MW)
- Speed: 32.5 knots (60.2 km/h; 37.4 mph)
- Range: 6,000 nmi (11,000 km; 6,900 mi) at 20 knots (37 km/h; 23 mph)
- Complement: 19 officers, 315 enlisted
- Sensors & processing systems: AN/SPS-40 air search radar; AN/SPG-60 fire control radar; AN/SPS-55 surface search radar; AN/SPQ-9 gun fire control radar; Mark 23 TAS automatic detection and tracking radar; AN/SPS-65 missile fire control radar; AN/SQS-53 bow-mounted active sonar; AN/SQR-19 TACTAS towed array passive sonar; Naval Tactical Data System
- Electronic warfare & decoys: AN/SLQ-32 electronic warfare system; AN/SLQ-25 Nixie torpedo countermeasures; Mark 36 SRBOC decoy launching system; AN/SLQ-49 inflatable decoys
- Armament: 2 × 5 in (127 mm) 54 caliber Mark 45 dual purpose guns; 2 × 20 mm Phalanx CIWS Mark 15 guns; 1 × 8 cell ASROC launcher (removed); 1 × 8 cell NATO Sea Sparrow Mark 29 missile launcher; 2 × quadruple Harpoon missile canisters; 2 × Mark 32 triple 12.75 in (324 mm) torpedo tubes (Mk 46 torpedoes); 1 × 61 cell Mk 41 VLS launcher for Tomahawk missiles
- Aircraft carried: 2 × Sikorsky SH-60 Seahawk LAMPS III helicopters
- Aviation facilities: Flight deck and enclosed hangar for up to two medium-lift helicopters

USS Peterson (DD-969), named for Lieutenant Commander Carl Jerrold Peterson (1936–1969), was a Spruance-class destroyer laid down by the Ingalls Shipbuilding Division of Litton Industries at Pascagoula, Mississippi. Peterson was sponsored by Mrs. Miriam C. Peterson, the mother of LCDR Carl J. Peterson. Matron of Honor was Peterson's sister, Mrs. John F. Elliott. She was commissioned on 9 July 1977 and decommissioned on 4 October 2002.

== Ship's history ==
=== First Persian Gulf deployments ===
1979 - Persian Gulf deployment. Peterson made her first deployment which included duty as flagship for Commander, Middle East Force in the Persian Gulf and the Indian Ocean. Upon return to Norfolk, Virginia she was awarded Destroyer Squadron Ten's Battle 'E'.

1980 - Persian Gulf In Support of Iran Hostage Crisis Vigilant Presence. Peterson spent her second deployment beginning in September 1980 in the Persian Gulf. She returned home in March 1981. Crew awarded Navy Expeditionary Medal for Peterson's roll in operations during the last 5 months of the Iran Hostage Crisis, while acting as US Navy's most forward deployed combatant on "Camel Station" in the Straits of Hormuz.

=== Operations in the Mediterranean Sea ===
1981 – Mediterranean deployment. Six months later, Peterson returned to the Mediterranean on 1 December 1981 for her third deployment in three years.

1982 - Overhaul. During a nine-month overhaul starting in July 1982, Peterson's weapons systems were upgraded to include the Target Acquisition System (TAS), two 20 mm Vulcan Phalanx CIWS mounts, and an enhanced communications and electronics suite.

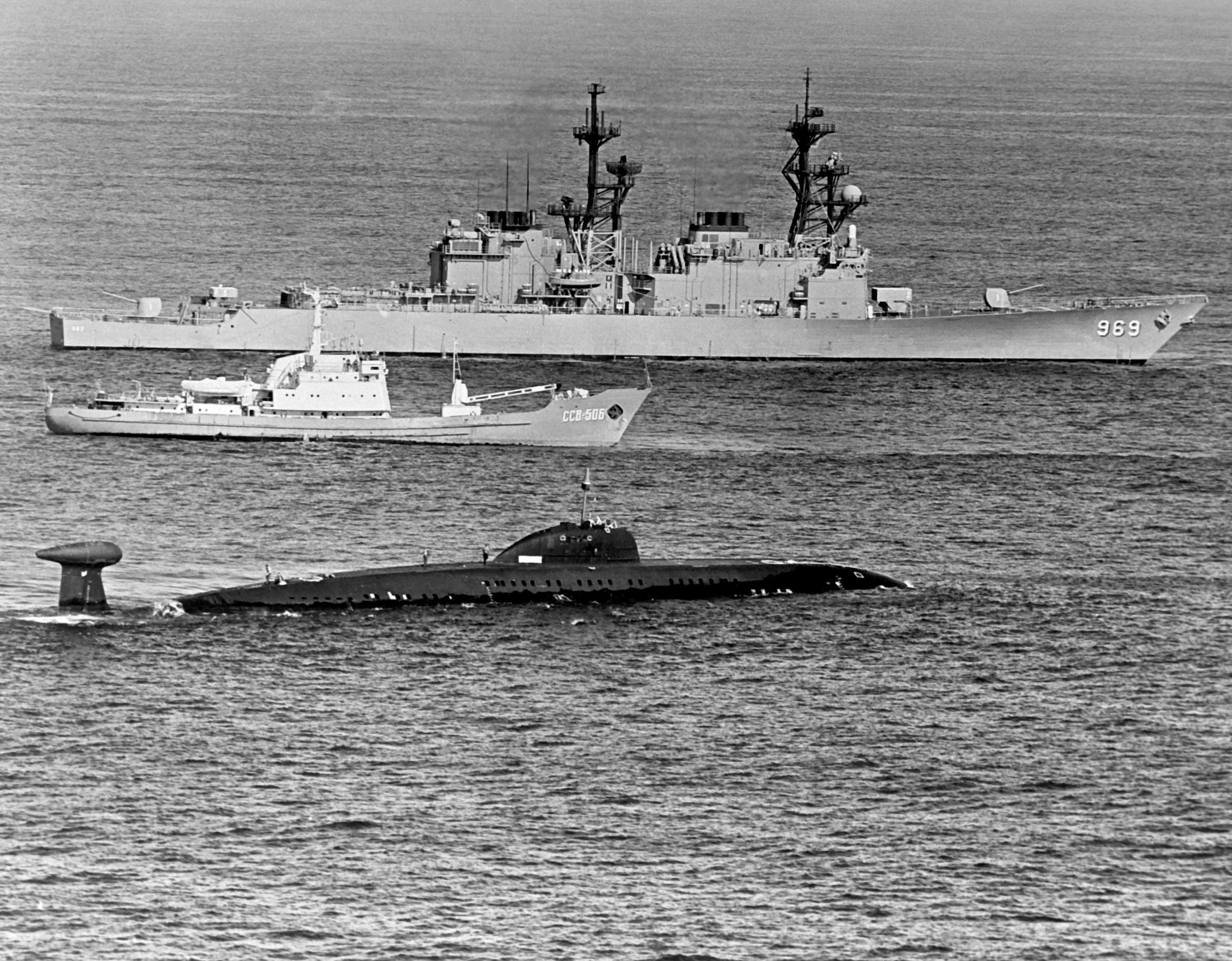
USS Peterson with a Victor-class submarine 15 October 1983

1984 - Mediterranean (Lebanon) deployment. Peterson was awarded the Armed Forces Expeditionary Medal for her role as naval gunfire support ship off the coast of Beirut, Lebanon as part of the Saratoga battle group in April 1984.

=== 1985 NATO Arctic exercises ===
1985 - Arctic deployment. In the Fall of 1985, Peterson participated in the NATO exercise 'Ocean Safari' in the North Atlantic, earning the title of 'Blue Nose' for the crossing of the Arctic Circle and was also awarded the Meritorious Unit Commendation for exceptional performance.

=== Libya and Northern Africa deployment ===
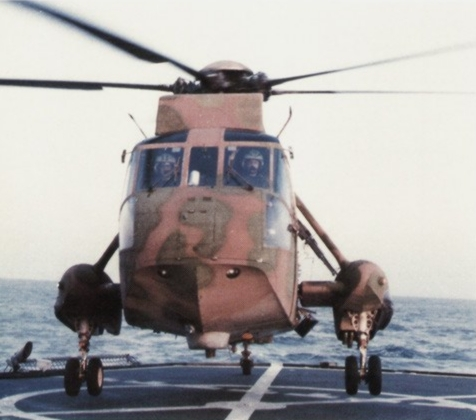
A camouflaged CSAR SH-3H of HS-11 on Peterson off Libya, 1986.

1986 - Mediterranean (Libya) deployment. In 1986, Peterson deployed to the Mediterranean with the America battle group and performed search and rescue duties during combat operations in the vicinity of Libya. She was awarded the Navy Unit Commendation for her efforts.

1988 - Mediterranean deployment. During Peterson's 1988 deployment, she served as the flagship for Commander, Destroyer Squadron Twenty Six and operated with the British, French, German, Spanish and Tunisian navies.

1990 - Mediterranean and African (Liberia) deployment. Peterson's 1990 deployment began in the Mediterranean with the Dwight D. Eisenhower battle group, visiting Naples, St. Maxime, Palma and Tunis. When civil war broke out in Liberia, Peterson was called upon to make a high speed transit to the site with embarked Marines to stand by to evacuate American citizens trapped by the fighting. For the rest of the deployment, Peterson assisted in the evacuation of more than 1,600 refugees with Saipan and her Marine Amphibious Readiness Group, before returning home in September.

=== 1991 Overhaul ===
1991 - Overhaul. On 15 March 1991 Peterson commenced a thirteen-month overhaul at Ingalls Shipbuilding Company in Pascagoula, Mississippi. Modifications included installation of the Mk 41 Vertical Launch System, SQQ-89 Anti-Submarine Warfare SONAR suite and double RAST tracks to support two SH-60B helicopters.

=== Gulf War Operations ===
1993 - Red Sea deployment (Operation Desert Storm). On 16 February 1993, Peterson commenced a six-month Middle East Force deployment in the Red Sea where she intercepted and boarded 247 vessels in support of United Nations sanctions against Iraq. In response to Iraq's attempted assassination of former U.S. President George H. W. Bush, Peterson successfully struck the Iraqi intelligence headquarters in Baghdad with 14 Tomahawk missiles on 26 June 1993, as directed by the Joint Chiefs of Staff. Peterson earned Destroyer Squadron Two's battle efficiency award for 1993.

=== Operation Uphold Democracy ===
1994 - Haitian operations. July and August 1994 saw Peterson off the coast of Haiti where she provided support for Operation Uphold Democracy.

=== 1995-2000 ===
1995 - Mediterranean deployment and selected restricted availability (SRA). On 14 April 1995 Peterson returned to Norfolk, Virginia culminating a highly successful Mediterranean deployment as a member of the Eisenhower battle group. While on deployment, Peterson played an active role in several community service projects including the highly visible Project Handclasp program. On 22 October Peterson commenced a three and a half month SRA which included the installation of the state of the art Tomahawk Weapons Control System (ATWCS). Peterson earned Destroyer Squadron Twenty Eight's battle efficiency award for 1995.

1996 - Counter drug operations. June and July 1996 saw Peterson off the coasts of South and Central America in the Eastern Pacific Ocean for counter drug operations. During this employment, the Peterson crew enjoyed a Line-crossing ceremony in sight of the Galápagos Islands. After returning home, she began training for her next deployment.

1997 - Atlantic deployment. In July 1997 Peterson deployed with NATO as a member of the Standing Naval Forces Atlantic Squadron. She operated with ships of the British, German, Dutch, Spanish, Portuguese, Canadian and other NATO navies.

1999 - Mediterranean deployment. Peterson deployed as flagship for the Standing Naval Forces Mediterranean Squadron in support of NATO. Peterson participated in the Kosovo campaign as part of this NATO battle group.

=== Operations in the Persian Gulf and boarding of the Samra ===
2001-2002 - Persian Gulf deployment. Peterson completed a deployment in support of Operation Enduring Freedom. She was at the tip of the spear, and involved in every facet of the operation. As the Comskey guardship and Commander, Destroyer Squadron Fifty flagship for maritime interdiction operations in the North Persian Gulf. Peterson was praised as 'One of the best to have operated in the Persian Gulf in a long time!'. She operated as Surface Action Group commander of the JASK operating area in the Gulf of Oman then again in the North Arabian Sea off Karachi, Pakistan. Peterson conducted 349 queries and 4 boardings - one of which resulted in crew member fatalities - in support of maritime interdiction operations. The ill-fated mission in question occurred on 18 November 2001, when 8 U.S. Navy members boarded Samra, an Iraqi oil-smuggling ship, suspecting it of violating oil sanctions against then president Saddam Hussein's regime. While on board, Samra sank, killing 2 of the USS Peterson's crewmen, and 1 of Samra's crew members. Peterson supported Bonhomme Richard amphibious readiness group as Combined Task Force 51 sea component commander conducting intelligence surveillance and reporting operations off the Horn of Africa for exercise Edged Mallet in the Gulf of Aden and Red Sea. She received more than ten accolades from national and fleet commanders for the timely, high quality reporting provided to the Office of Naval Intelligence, greatly improving understanding of suspect activities in the Horn of Africa region. Peterson safely completed a 196-day deployment with 178 days spent underway, with over 600 queries conducted, more than 700 flight evolutions, 34 underway replenishments, 6 sea and anchor details, and more than 500 small boat operations.

=== Final Operations and decommissioning ===
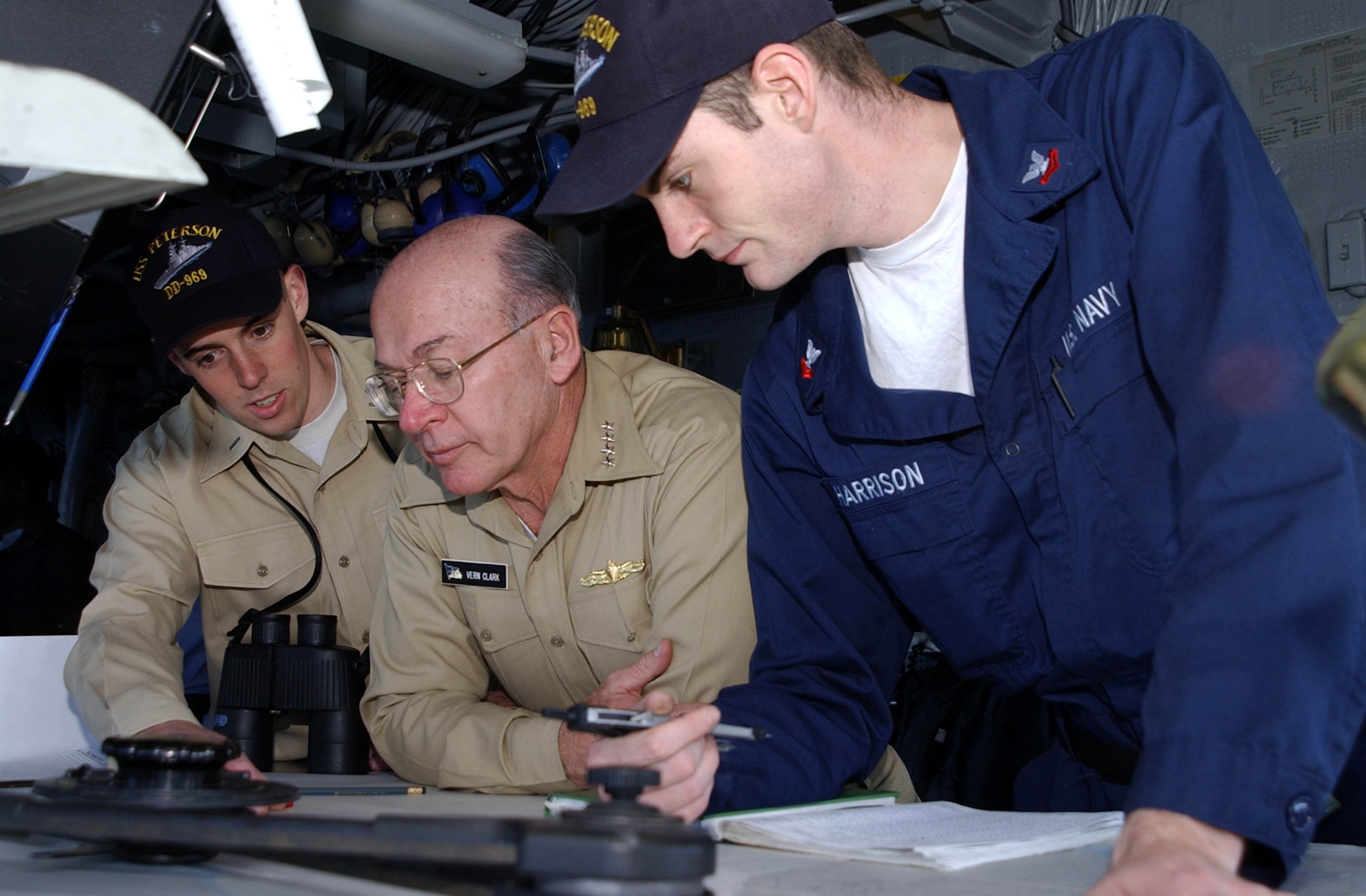
Chief of Naval Operations aboard USS Peterson on 17 January 2002

Final underway: While returning from Newport, Rhode Island, Peterson steamed for 6 hours at full power and successfully fired 100 rounds from her 5"/54 guns. This demonstration of strength proved that she was an asset to her country until the end.

Peterson decommissioned on 4 October 2002, and was stricken from the Naval Vessel Register on 6 November 2002. On 16 February 2004 she was sunk in the western North Atlantic Ocean in support of weapons effect tests for the new DD-21 program, later renamed DD(X), then again renamed DDG 1000, which is the current Program of Record. The ship's bell was transferred to Baldwin County, Alabama for display at the war memorial at the Foley satellite courthouse and was unveiled on 5 January 2012. The site of the wreck was confirmed in approximately 2,400 m (7,874 ft) of water on 7 July 2014 by the EV Nautilus.

== Gallery ==
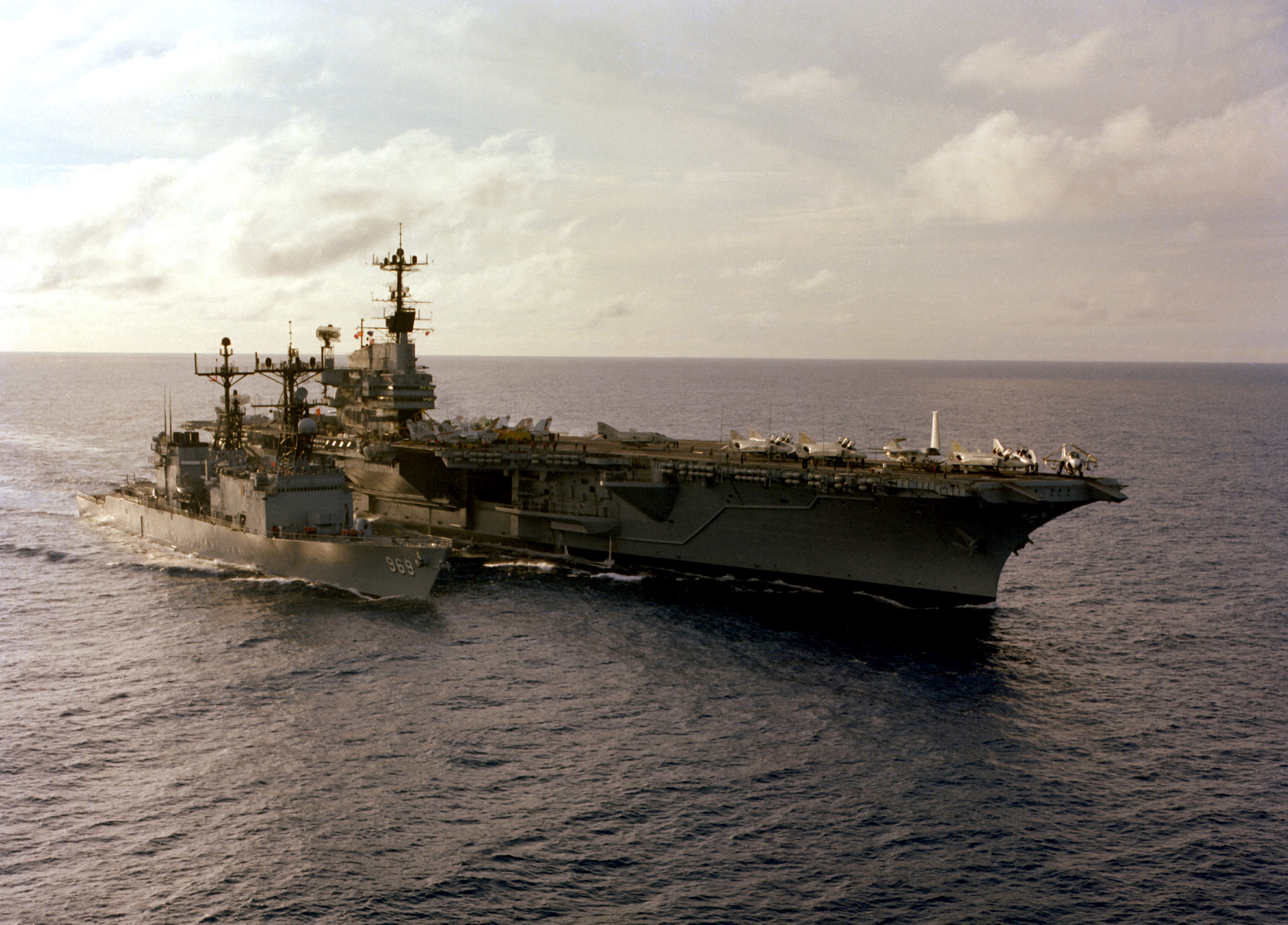
USS Peterson and USS Independence on 1979

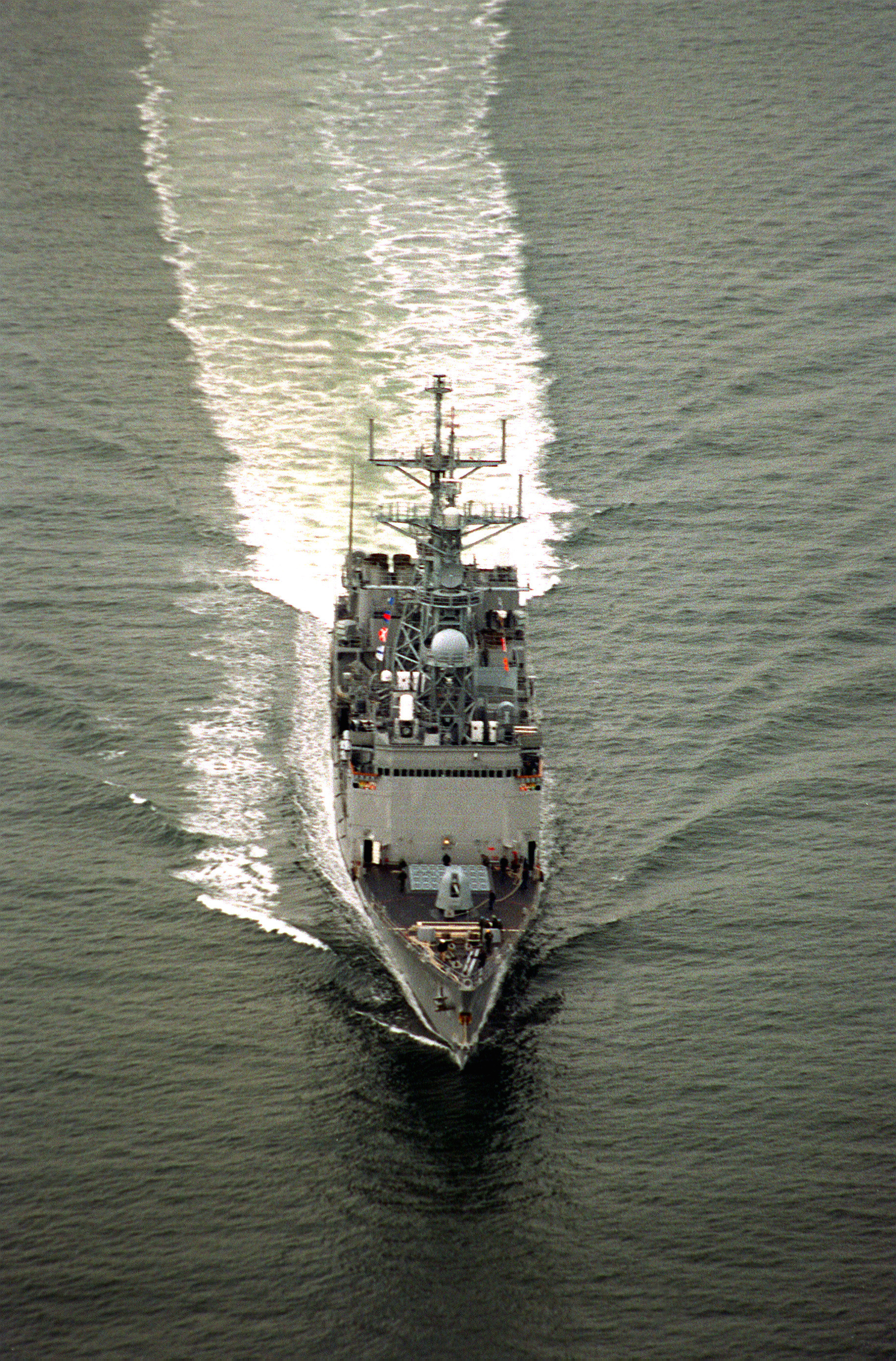
USS Peterson on 1 November 1996

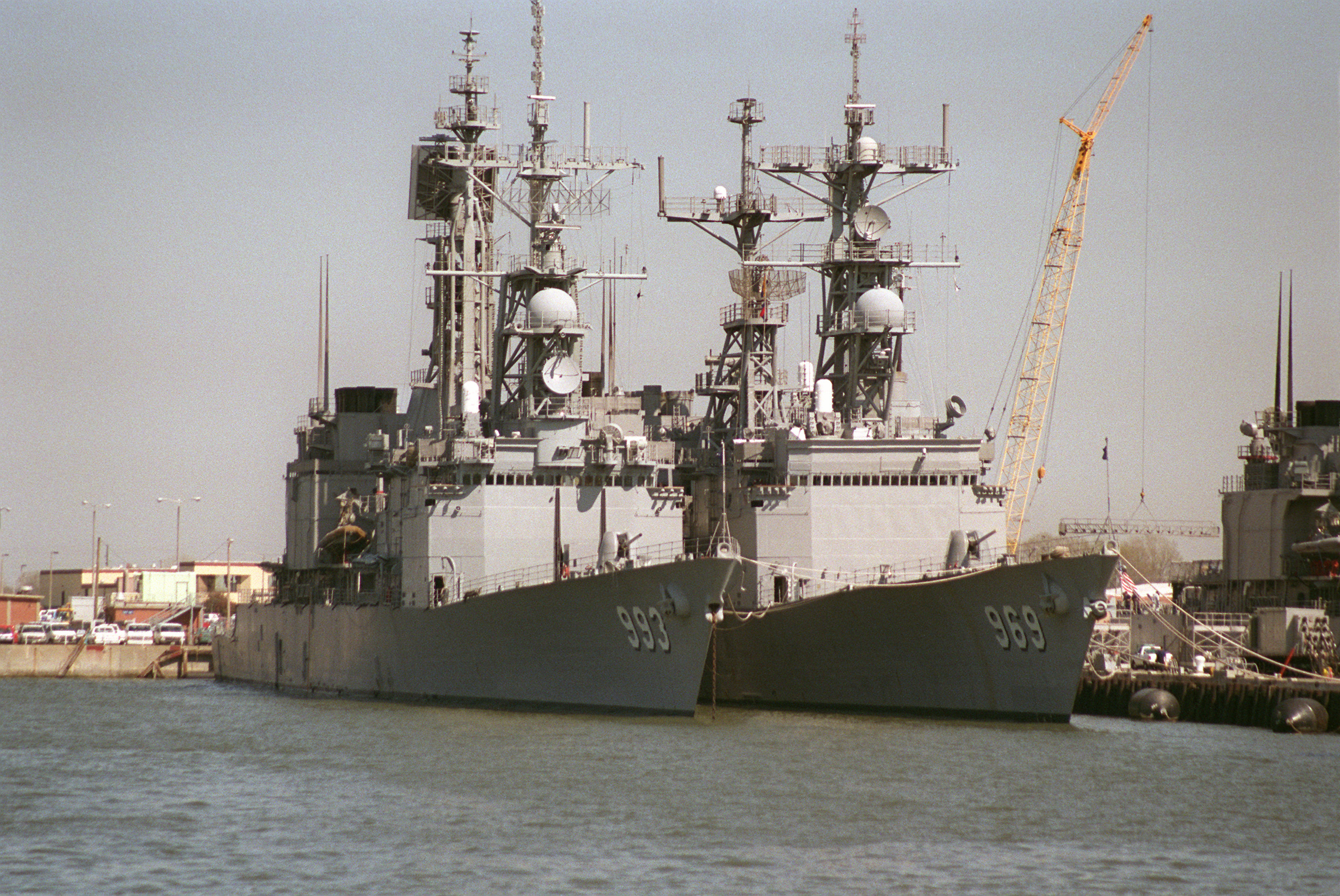
USS Kidd and USS Peterson on 12 April 1996

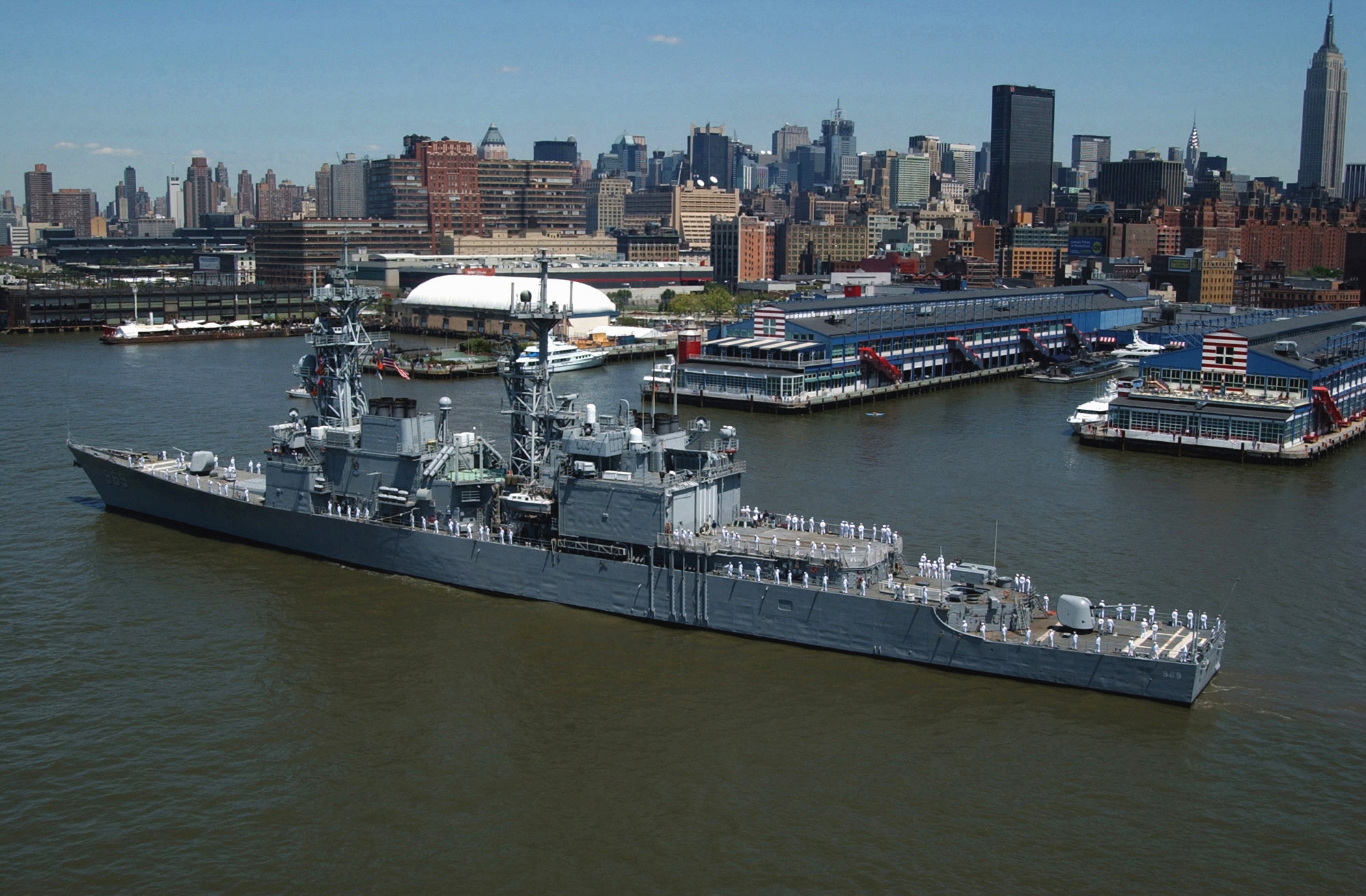
USS Peterson in the Hudson River in 2002
