= USS McCaffery =

Gearing-class destroyer

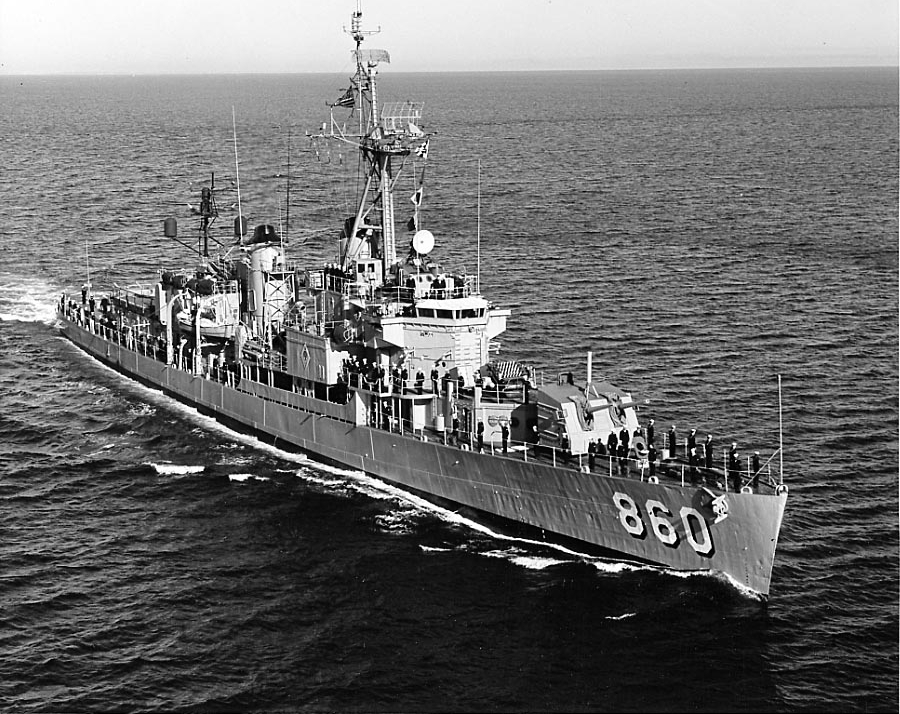
- USS McCaffery after FRAM II

History

United States
- Name: USS McCaffery
- Namesake: Joseph P. McCaffery
- Builder: Bethlehem Shipbuilding in San Pedro, California
- Laid down: 1 October 1944
- Launched: 12 April 1945
- Commissioned: 26 July 1945
- Stricken: 30 September 1973
- Identification: Callsign: NBFK; Hull number: DD-860
- Nickname(s): "Big Mac"
- Fate: Sold for scrap, 11 June 1974

General characteristics
- Class & type: Gearing-class destroyer
- Displacement: 3,460 tons (full)
- Length: 390 ft 6 in (119 m)
- Beam: 40 ft 10 in (12 m)
- Draft: 14 ft 4 in (4 m)
- Propulsion: Two-screw General Electric geared turbines, 60,000 shp (45,000 kW)
- Speed: 36.8 knots (68.2 km/h; 42.3 mph)
- Range: 4,500 nmi (8,300 km; 5,200 mi) at 20 kn (37 km/h; 23 mph)
- Complement: 336
- Armament: 6 × 5"/38 caliber guns (3x2); 12 × 40 mm guns; 11 × 20 mm guns; 10 × 21" torpedo tubes (2x5) 10 torpedoes

USS McCaffery (DD/DDE-860) was a Gearing-class destroyer in service with the United States Navy from 1945 to 1973. She was scrapped in 1974.

== Namesake ==
Joseph P. McCaffery was born on 20 August 1906 in Chester, Pennsylvania. He accepted a commission in the United States Marine Corps Reserves in March 1929, after resigning a commission in the Army Reserve held from 1927 as a graduate of Pennsylvania Military College, now Widener University. A veteran of the Guadalcanal campaign and New Georgia campaign, he was fatally wounded in the Landings at Cape Torokina, Bougainville on 1 November 1943, as he led his Marine Raider battalion against entrenched Japanese positions. He was posthumously awarded the Navy Cross.

== History ==
Nicknamed "Big Mac", ironic as its namesake was nicknamed "Little Joe", McCaffery was laid down by the Bethlehem Shipbuilding at San Pedro in California on 1 October 1944, launched on 12 April 1945 by Miss Patricia McCaffery, niece of Lieutenant Colonel McCaffery and commissioned on 26 July 1945.

McCaffery operated with the 7th Fleet in support of United Nations Forces during the Korean War, alternated operations along the east coast and in the Caribbean with the 2nd Fleet with deployments to the Mediterranean with the 6th Fleet, underwent an extensive Fleet Rehabilitation and Modernization (FRAM) overhaul at the New York Naval Shipyard in 1961, participated in quarantine operations during the Cuban Missile Crisis in 1962, acted as communications relay ship for the Mercury space shot in May 1963, participated in the recovery missions for the Gemini IX and Gemini XII missions, and participated in Sea Dragon and Market Time operations, patrolled on search and rescue duties and carried out naval gunfire support missions during the Vietnam War.

McCaffery was decommissioned and stricken from the Naval Vessel Register on 30 September 1973, and sold for scrap on 11 June 1974.
