= Operation Desert Badger =

Operation Desert Badger was a U.S. plan for response if a U.S. airman was shot down while patrolling the Iraqi no-fly zones. It was designed to disrupt the Iraqis' ability to capture the pilot by attacking Saddam's command and control centers in downtown Baghdad. It included an escalating attack if the pilot was captured. This attack would allow for the President of the United States to order a small attack within four hours—either with U.S. aircraft or some fifty Tomahawk cruise missiles from Navy ships in the Persian Gulf. The plan was not devised as a way to invade Iraq, but was designed to be a larger attack than 1998's Operation Desert Fox.
