= Advanced Enclosed Mast/Sensor =

US Navy ship mast and radome

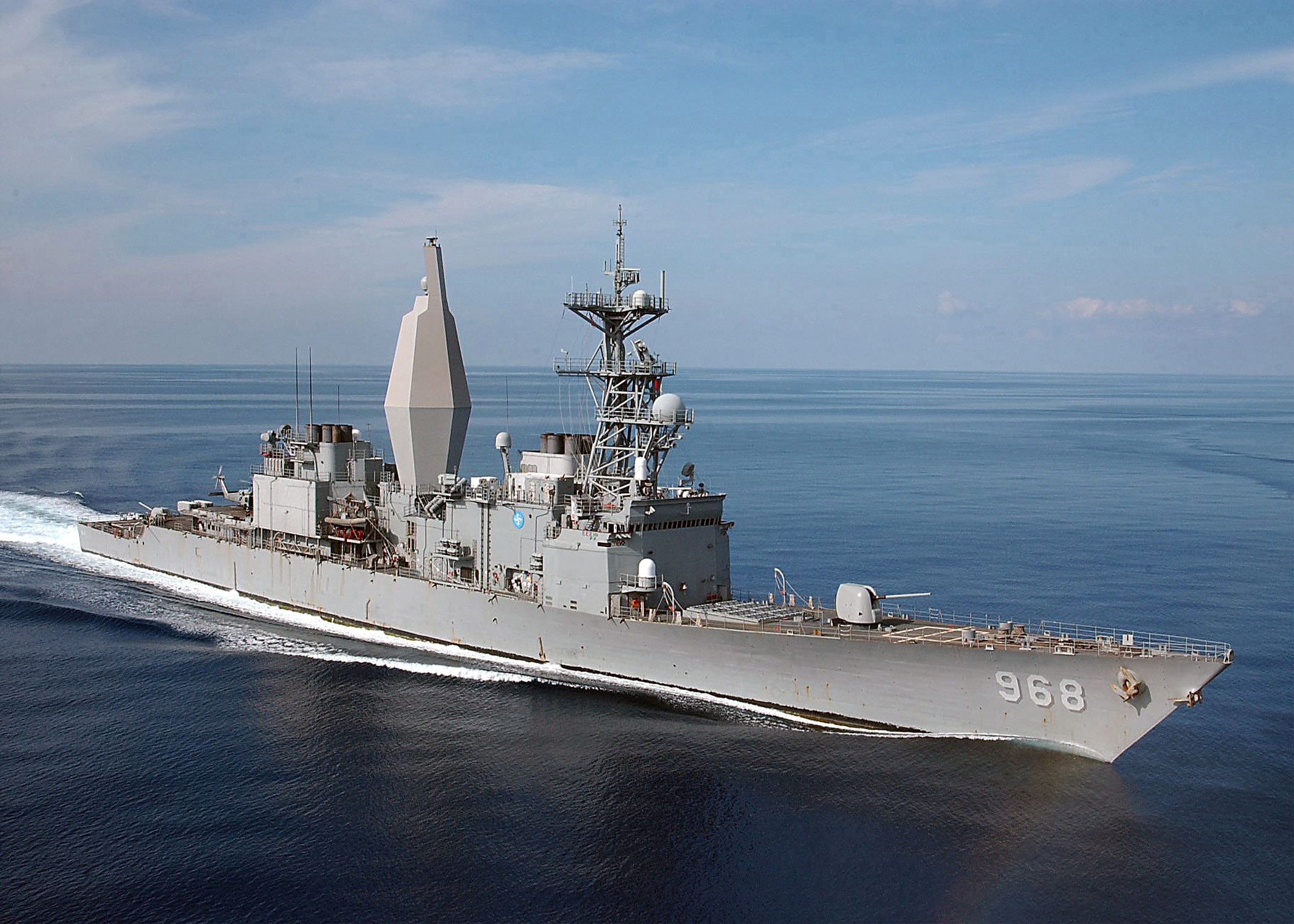
USS Arthur W. Radford with the aft mast replaced by the proof-of-concept AEM/S.

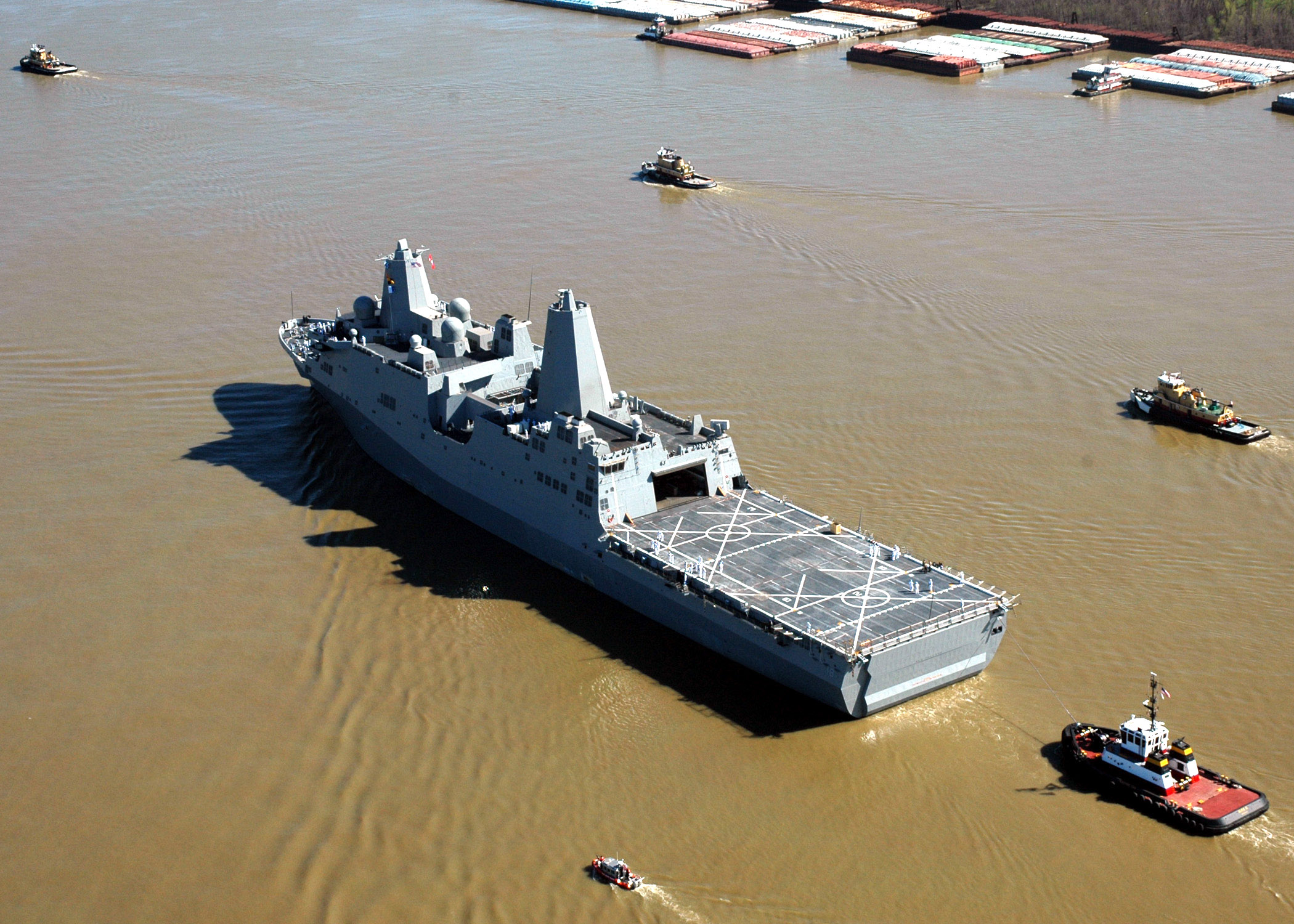
USS New Orleans with fore and aft AEM/S.

The US Navy's Advanced Enclosed Mast/Sensor (AEM/S) system fully integrates advanced materials, structures, and manufacturing technologies with sensor technology, electromagnetics, and signature reduction.

Ship masts, with the complex antenna geometries mounted on them, as well as the latticework of the mast structure, contribute significantly to a ship's radar cross section. The AEM/S consists of a faceted radome that provides a cleaner exterior profile, with internal platforms on which antennas and sensors are mounted. The radome material is designed so that the antennas can transmit and receive through the material. The base of the mast is constructed from fiber reinforced composite skins encasing end-grain balsa core. The upper (radome) section consists of structural foam and fiberglass.

In May 1997, USS Arthur W. Radford received the first-ever shipboard installation of the AEM/S System, to serve as a proof-of-concept or advanced technology demonstrator. Sailors reported an unanticipated benefit of being able to work aloft in bad weather, increasing the efficiency of scheduled shipboard maintenance.

Using lessons learned from the Radford, the Navy designed the AEM/S into a new class of ships, the first being the USS San Antonio (LPD-17) amphibious transport dock.
