= USS Radford =

USS Radford may refer to the following ships of the United States Navy:

- USS Radford (DD-120), a Wickes-class destroyer in World War I, named in honor of Rear Admiral William Radford.
- USS Radford (DD-446), a Fletcher-class destroyer in World War II, also named after William Radford.
- USS Arthur W. Radford (DD-968), a Spruance-class destroyer, named in honor of Admiral Arthur W. Radford.
