= USS Arthur W. Radford =

Spruance-class destroyer in the United States Navy

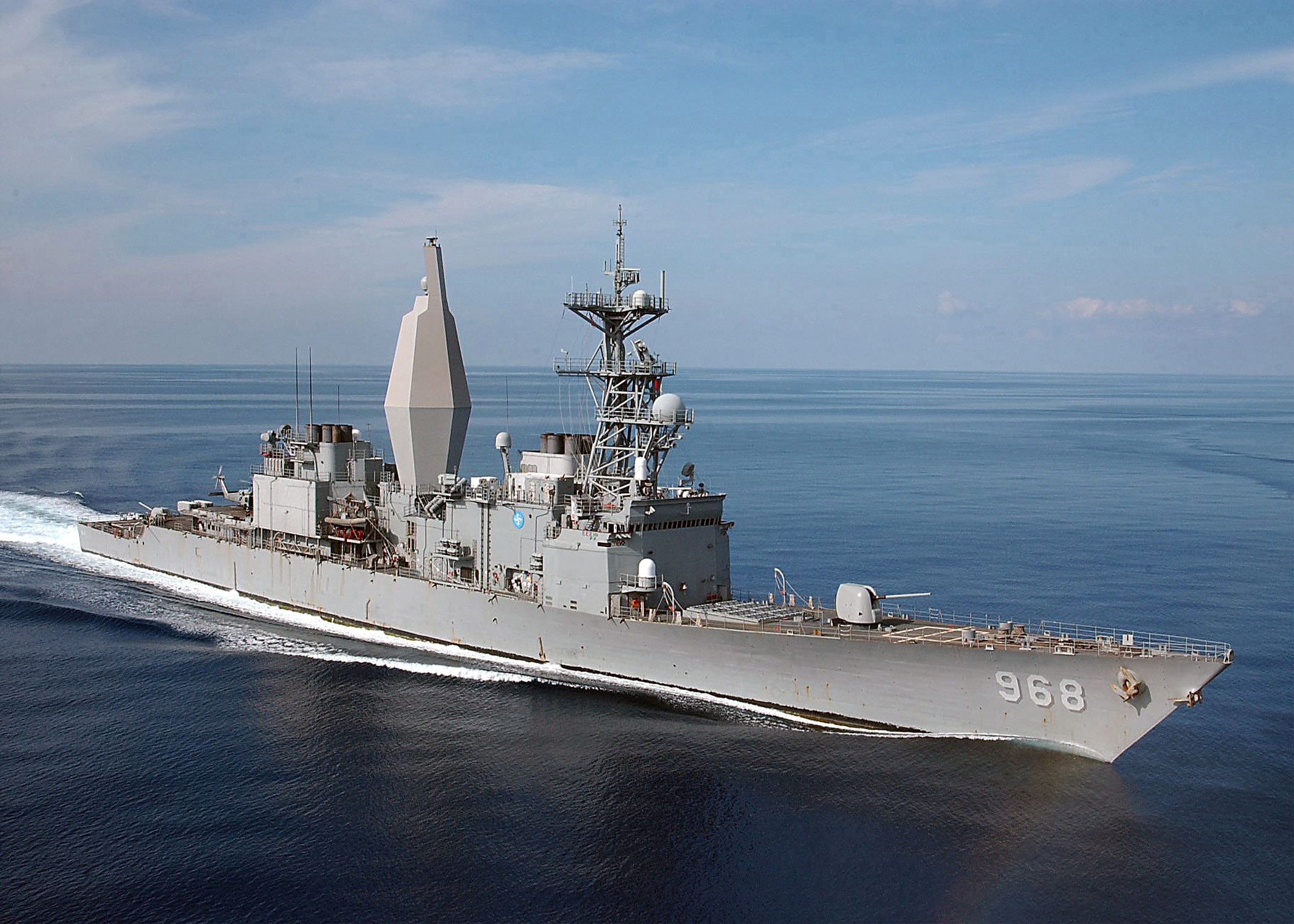
- USS Arthur W. Radford in the Mediterranean Sea, circa 27 November 2002, equipped with an experimental Advanced Enclosed Mast/Sensor

History

United States
- Name: Arthur W. Radford
- Namesake: Arthur W. Radford
- Ordered: 15 January 1971
- Builder: Ingalls Shipbuilding
- Laid down: 31 January 1974
- Launched: 1 March 1975 (Note: 1 March 1975 per NVR and Janes)
- Christened: 5 April 1975
- Acquired: 4 April 1977
- Commissioned: 16 April 1977
- Decommissioned: 18 March 2003
- Stricken: 6 April 2004
- Identification: Callsign: NAWR; Hull number: DD-968
- Motto: Patriotism, Perseverance, and Preparedness
- Fate: Scuttled, 10 August 2011
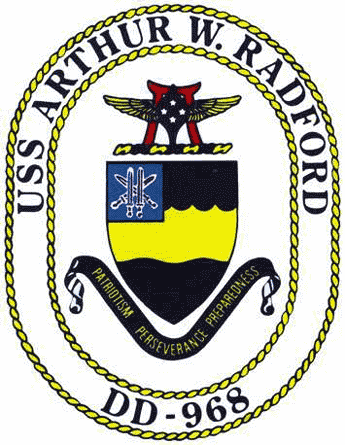
- Badge

General characteristics
- Class & type: Spruance-class destroyer
- Displacement: 8,040 long tons (8,170 t) full load
- Length: 529 ft (161 m) waterline; 563 ft (172 m) overall
- Beam: 55 ft (17 m)
- Draft: 29 ft (8.8 m)
- Installed power: 3 × 501-K17 generator sets (2,000 kW (2,700 hp) each)
- Propulsion: 4 × General Electric LM2500 gas turbines, 2 shafts, 80,000 shp (60 MW)
- Speed: 32.5 knots (60.2 km/h; 37.4 mph)
- Range: 6,000 nmi (11,000 km; 6,900 mi) at 20 knots (37 km/h; 23 mph)
- Complement: 19 officers, 315 enlisted
- Sensors & processing systems: AN/SPS-40 air search radar; AN/SPG-60 fire control radar; AN/SPS-55 surface search radar; AN/SPQ-9 gun fire control radar; Mark 23 TAS automatic detection and tracking radar; AN/SPS-65 missile fire control radar; AN/SQS-53 bow-mounted active sonar; AN/SQR-19 TACTAS towed array passive sonar; Naval Tactical Data System
- Electronic warfare & decoys: AN/SLQ-32 electronic warfare system; AN/SLQ-25 Nixie torpedo countermeasures; Mark 36 SRBOC decoy launching system; AN/SLQ-49 inflatable decoys
- Armament: 2 × 5 in (127 mm) 54 caliber Mark 45 dual purpose guns; 2 × 20 mm Phalanx CIWS Mark 15 guns; 1 × 8 cell ASROC launcher (removed); 1 × 8 cell NATO Sea Sparrow Mark 29 missile launcher; 2 × quadruple Harpoon missile canisters; 2 × Mark 32 triple 12.75 in (324 mm) torpedo tubes (Mk 46 torpedoes); 1 × 61 cell Mk 41 VLS launcher for Tomahawk missiles
- Aircraft carried: 2 × Sikorsky SH-60 Seahawk LAMPS III helicopters
- Aviation facilities: Flight deck and enclosed hangar for up to two medium-lift helicopters

USS Arthur W. Radford (DD-968) was a Spruance-class destroyer in the United States Navy. She was named for Admiral Arthur W. Radford USN (1896–1973), the first naval officer to be Chairman of the Joint Chiefs of Staff. She was decommissioned on 18 March 2003 after serving for 26 years, and on 10 August 2011 her hull was scuttled off the coast of Delaware to form part of an artificial reef.

== Construction and commissioning ==
Arthur W. Radford was laid down 31 January 1974 by the Ingalls Shipbuilding Division of Litton Industries at Pascagoula, Mississippi, and launched on 1 March 1975, (Note: NVR and Janes (ISBN 0-7924-5626-2 p.172) state launched 1 March 1975. DANFS and a ship published welcome aboard pamphlet (via navsource) state launched 27 February 1975. Biloxi Sun Herald states christened Saturday, 5 April 1975.) sponsored by Mrs. Arthur Radford, the admiral's widow. Arthur W. Radford was commissioned on 16 April 1977,

== Early operations ==
Underway for the United States East Coast the day she was commissioned, Arthur W. Radford was forced to return to her builder's yard for repairs soon thereafter, but got underway again on 30 April. Touching at Charleston, South Carolina, on 3 and 4 May, the ship proceeded to her home port Norfolk, Virginia, which she reached on 6 May.

Three days later, she steamed for Newport, Rhode Island, to provide support for the Naval Surface Warfare Officer Training Command. While the ship proceeded north, a LAMPS helicopter practice-landed on her helo deck to prepare for the embarkation of a LAMPS III detachment. The helicopter returned to Norfolk later that day 11 May. Mooring at Newport on 13 May, the destroyer remained there until 17 May, when she headed home. Soon after returning to Norfolk, she conducted gunnery exercises and helicopter operations off the Virginia Capes.

The ship headed down the coast on 24 May and reached Port Canaveral, Florida, the following day. After embarking Capt. R. K. Albright, Commander, Destroyer Squadron 22 (DesRon 22) the destroyer got underway on 27 May and, for the next few days, conducted air, surface, and sub-surface surveillance of the surrounding waters while President Jimmy Carter, observed operations on board the attack submarine Los Angeles. The destroyer rendezvoused with the submarine prior to her initial dive and then again when the submarine surfaced. Throughout the operation, she provided support services for local and national press covering the Chief Executive's voyage.

Underway for Norfolk on 31 May, Arthur W. Radford reached her home port on 2 June for local operations. While returning from waters off the Virginia Capes on 6 June, the ship ran into low-visibility conditions and winds in excess of 90 knots (170 km/h) which disabled a radar antenna and drove the ship outside the main shipping channel. At one point her fathometer read only 30 centimeters of water under the keel.

Fighting her way back to the channel in the teeth of the gale Arthur W. Radford sighted a capsized motor vessel, Dixie Lee II, 300 yards (270 m) south of Thimble A Shoals Channel buoy 21. Unable to assist due to the shallow water and high winds, the destroyer notified the United States Coast Guard of bodies seen floating in the water. The destroyer then anchored in Hampton Roads until the wind had dropped and shipping, adrift in the vicinity, had moved off.

Arthur W. Radford then proceeded to the West Indies for training operations including gunfire support. En route to Frederickstad, Saint Croix, in the U.S. Virgin Islands, in late June she conducted further weapons tests. Firing a gunnery exercise at Vieques, Puerto Rico, the destroyer returned to the eastern seaboard with a port visit to Fort Lauderdale, Florida on Independence Day 1977. During this firing exercise, a dummy shell hit USS Opportune which was towing a target sled. Further work in the Bahamas, and at Guantanamo Bay, preceded her return to Charleston, South Carolina, on the last day of July. She then headed home where she arrived on 3 August.

The ship returned to Pascagoula on 11 September for post-shakedown availability and remained in her builder's hands until she returned to Norfolk in mid-October. Entering the Norfolk Naval Shipyard on 25 October for restricted availability, she remained there into the spring of 1978 before resuming local operations out of her home port. She principally engaged in ship qualification trials and underway training before steaming south to Guantanamo Bay and Vieques for refresher training and gunfire support practice, respectively. Following these evolutions, the ship returned to Norfolk on 30 July 1978.

On 23 August, Arthur W. Radford got underway from the Naval Weapons Station Yorktown Virginia, and headed for NATO exercises in the North Atlantic. En route, she participated in Exercise "Common Effort", carrying out escort duties in an "opposed Atlantic transit", and briefly embarked Vice Admiral Wesley L. McDonald, Commander, U.S. 2nd Fleet. Next came Operation "Northern Wedding" a joint NATO exercise which began on 4 September and involved several carrier groups in an amphibious landing and many other facets of simulated naval warfare. During that operation, Arthur W. Radford operated alongside Royal Navy, Royal Danish Navy, Royal Norwegian Navy, Swedish Navy, West German Navy, and Canadian Forces Maritime naval units. During this exercise, the ship encountered huge seas from Hurricane Flossie.

Following the conclusion of "Northern Wedding", the destroyer visited Copenhagen, Denmark; Rotterdam, the Netherlands, and Portsmouth, England. She again embarked VADM McDonald at Portsmouth on 16 October and wore his flag during the return voyage to Norfolk. The admiral disembarked upon her arrival at Norfolk on 25 October. The destroyer then operated locally through the winter, varying periods between in port for upkeep and getting underway for training.

== First deployment and interim ==
Arthur W. Radford cleared Norfolk on 13 March 1979, bound for the Mediterranean and a tour with the U.S. 6th Fleet. Over the next six months, she participated in a variety of exercises and visited the ports of Catania, Sicily; Split, Yugoslavia; Trieste, Italy; Alexandria, Egypt; Cannes, France, Palma, Spain; Barcelona, Spain; Toulon, France, Théoule, France, Rota, Spain and Valencia, Spain. During the deployment, the vessel fired her first Harpoon missile in the Mediterranean on 28 July. Her target was the hulk of a destroyer, ex-Lansdowne (later the Turkish TCG Gaziantep (D-344)). Arthur W. Radford also participated in Exercise "Multiplex 1-79" in the Ionian Sea, Exercise "Dawn Patrol" in the Tyrrhenian Sea and Ionian Seas, Exercise "Tridente" out of Alexandria, and Exercise "National Week" XXVII, Phases 1 and 2. While en route from Toulon to Theoule, France, she rescued the French ketch, Laurca, adrift 50 miles (80 km) from the French resort of St. Tropez.

Clearing Rota on 12 September, Arthur W. Radford reached Norfolk on 22 September. Underway for Miami, Florida on 23 October, she served as the platform for deck landing qualifications for helicopter pilots en route, and, after touching at Mayport, Florida to unload a crippled H 3 helicopter from HSL-30, reached Miami on 27 October for a two-day port visit.

After returning briefly to Norfolk from 31 October to 5 November, the destroyer proceeded to Halifax, Nova Scotia, and participated in a training exercise with American and Canadian warships. During the course of Exercise "Canus-Marcot" she logged her 1,000th helicopter landing of 1979. Returning to Norfolk on 21 November, she remained in port for the remainder of the year 1979.

For the first half of 1980, the warship principally operated off the eastern seaboard of the United States, and ranged as far north as Halifax and as far south as the Caribbean, working briefly out of Vieques and Roosevelt Roads Naval Station, as well as out of Jacksonville, Florida. During this time, she also visited Annapolis, Maryland, where United States Naval Academy midshipmen toured the ship's engineering plant on an orientation visit. Admiral James L. Holloway III, the former Chief of Naval Operations, visited the ship as well.

== Second deployment and interim ==
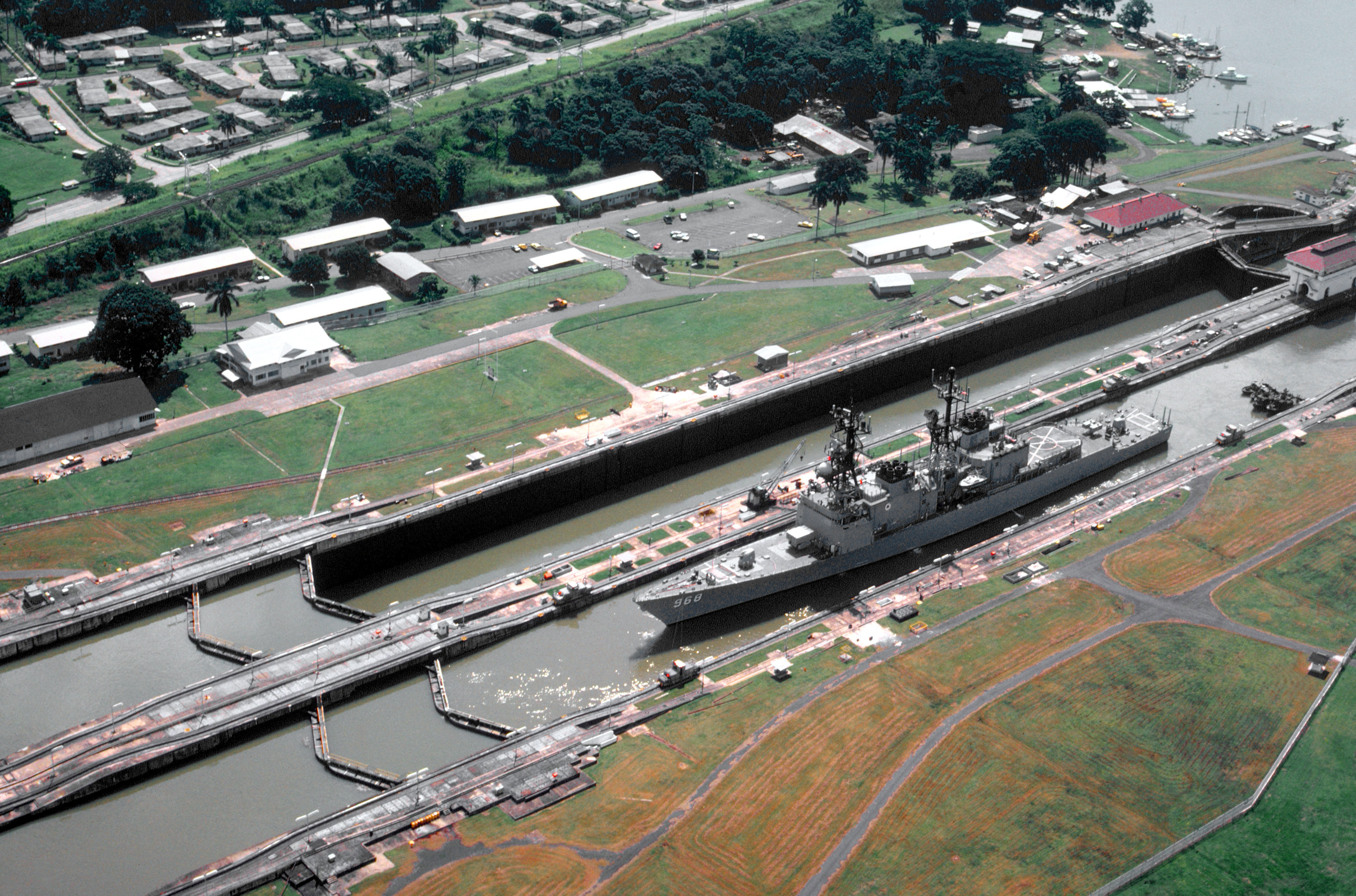
Arthur W. Radford (DD-968) transits the Panama Canal during Unitas XXI.

Following a brief period at the Norfolk Naval Shipyard, Arthur W. Radford prepared for another extended deployment. She departed Norfolk on 21 June 1980, embarking HSL-34, Detachment 2 and proceeded to Roosevelt Roads, where she embarked Rear Admiral Peter K. Cullins, Commander, South Atlantic Force and his staff to become Cullins' flagship for UNITAS XXI. Visits to Saint Kitts and to Bridgetown, Barbados, followed before the destroyer sailed for Venezuelan waters.

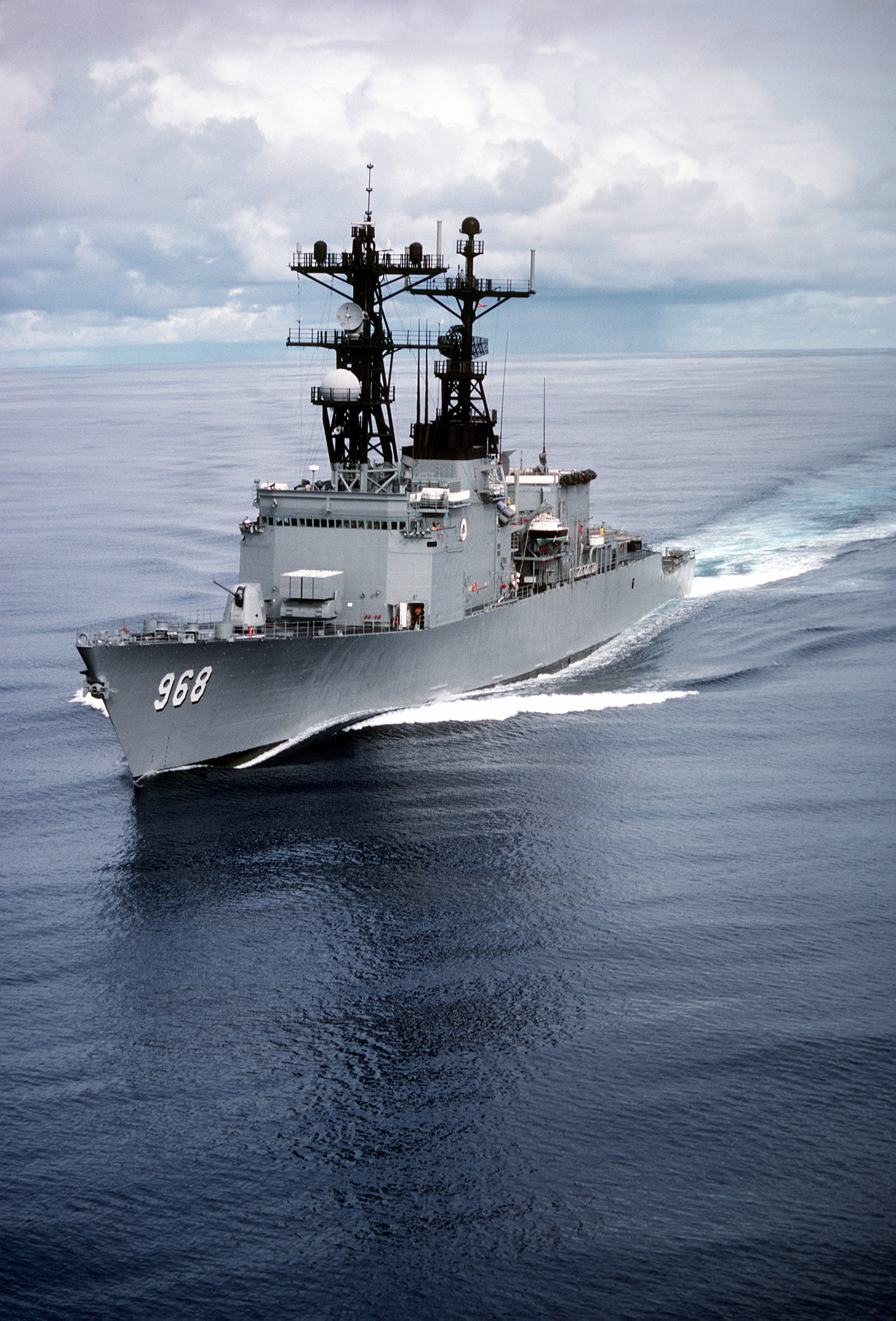
Arthur W. Radford c.1981 with ASROC launcher, without CIWS and original mast.

Over the next four months, Arthur W. Radford operated with elements of the Venezuelan, Ecuadorian, Peruvian, Colombian, Trinidad and Tobagonian, Argentine, Uruguayan, and Brazilian navies. Her ports of call included Puerto La Cruz and La Guaira, Venezuela, Rodman, Panama, Manta, Ecuador, Paito and Callao, Peru, Cartagena, Colombia; Trinidad and Tobago, Puerto Belgrano, and Bahía Blanca, Argentina, Montevideo, Uruguay, and the Brazilian ports of Santos, Rio de Janeiro, Salvador and Recife. She also transited the Panama Canal twice during UNITAS XXI, the first time on 21 July 1980 and the second on 24 August.

Completing UNITAS XXI on 4 November, Arthur W. Radford sailed for Gabon, as a unit of the West Africa Training Cruise (WATC), reaching Libreville, the capital of Gabon, on 12 November. Over the next few weeks, she visited Tema, Ghana Freetown, Sierra Leone, and Dakar, Senegal. Clearing Dakar on 1 December, the destroyer stopped at Guadeloupe and at Roosevelt Roads on the return voyage and arrived at Norfolk on 15 December.

The ship spent the next two years engaged in operations along the East Coast and in the West Indies mostly in underway training out of Norfolk, Roosevelt Roads, and Vieques and in refresher training at Guantanamo Bay. During the summer of 1981, she operated out of Annapolis, training midshipmen. She underwent upkeep at Norfolk and Boston, Massachusetts, and received an overhaul at her builder's yard. En route to Puerto Rico, the ship had a Coast Guard detachment embarked from 20 to 23 September 1982, and cooperated with the Coast Guard on drug interdiction duties.

== Third deployment and interim ==
For the first few months of 1983, Arthur W. Radford operated primarily in the Virginia Capes area, but ranged into the Atlantic as far as the Bahamas. After embarking Commander, Destroyer Squadron 26, at Norfolk on 7 March to begin a nine-month period on board, Arthur W. Radford hosted Secretary of the Navy John F. Lehman, Jr., on 29 March. A little less than one month later the destroyer cleared Norfolk on 27 April for a six-month deployment in the Mediterranean.

Touching at Gibraltar on 10 May, Arthur W. Radford proceeded to Augusta Bay, Sicily, and thence moved to waters off the coast of Lebanon. After supporting the multinational peacekeeping force in Beirut from 20 to 28 May, the destroyer visited Taranto, Italy, before returning to Lebanese waters for another brief period. During a port call at the Romanian port of Constanţa along with guided-missile frigate Antrim, the destroyer served as flagship for Vice Admiral William H. Rowden, Commander, 6th Fleet.

Visiting Catania, Sicily, Monte Carlo, Monaco, and Livorno, Italy, Arthur W. Radford exercised with U.S. 6th Fleet battle groups later that summer, later visiting Gaeta and Naples, Italy. While visiting Istanbul, Turkey, she hosted the retired Army leader and former presidential advisor General Alexander M. Haig.

Arthur W. Radford returned to the waters off Beirut on 18 September 1983 to assume duty as ready gunfire support ship. She conducted gunfire support missions against forces threatening the peacekeeping force on 21 and 22 September until relieved on station by the battleship New Jersey on 8 October. Visits to La Maddalena, Sardinia, and to Tangier, Morocco rounded out the destroyer's time in the U.S. 6th Fleet. Operating briefly with Spanish Navy units en route to the turnover port of Rota, Arthur W. Radford cleared Rota on 10 November with the battle group formed around the carrier Dwight D. Eisenhower. She arrived at Norfolk 11 days later, remaining there for the rest of 198

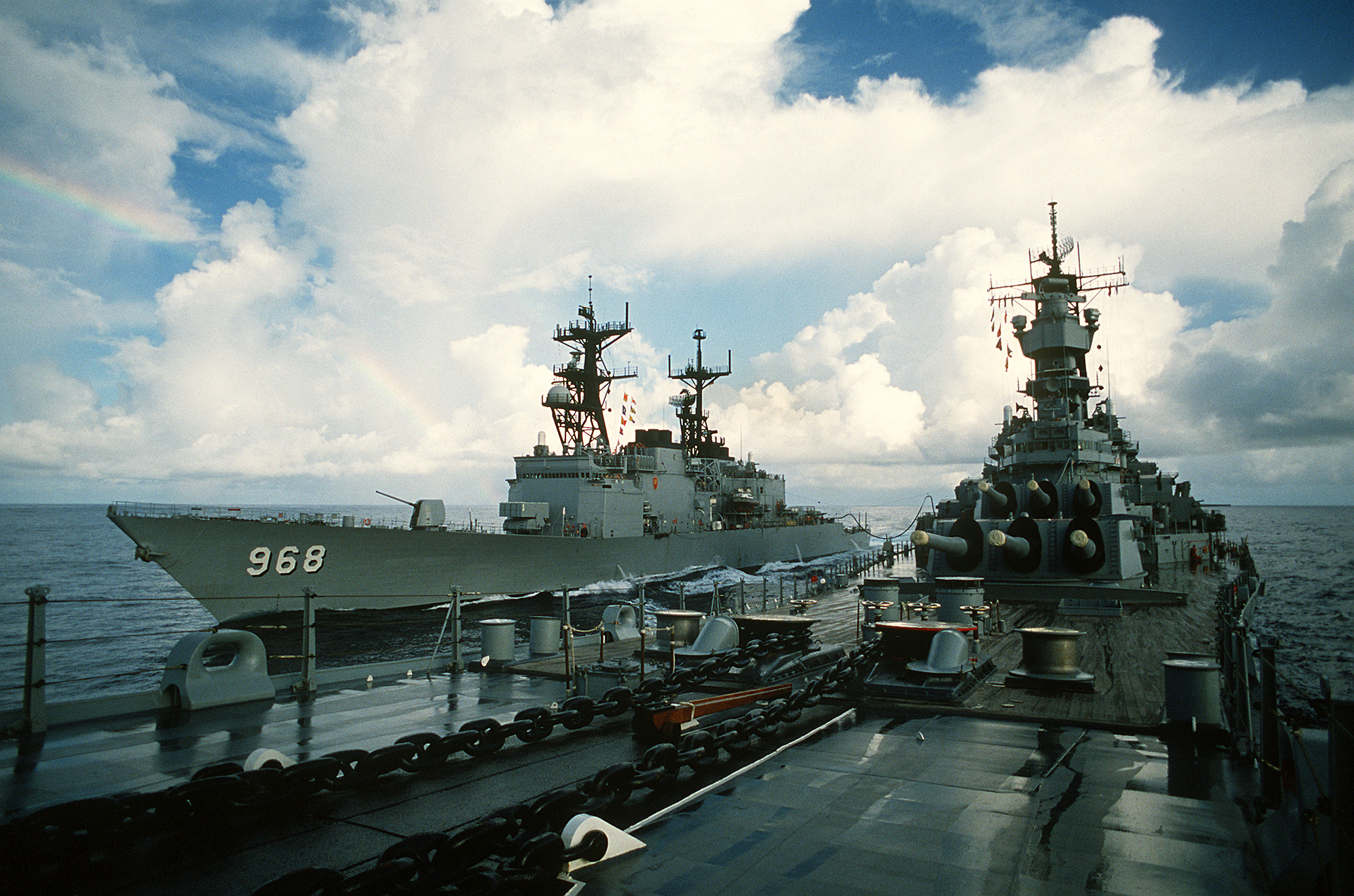
Arthur W. Radford performing an underway replenishment with Iowa.

3.

Arthur W. Radford operated briefly in the Virginia Capes area in January 1984 before undergoing an overhaul at the Metro Machine Shipyard at Portsmouth, Virginia, between 16 February and 27 April. Subsequently, undergoing sea trials and repairs in the floating drydock Sustain, Arthur W. Radford conducted routine training out of Norfolk through early August.

The destroyer next operated out of Roosevelt Roads and off St. Croix before returning to Norfolk at the end of August and becoming flagship for Destroyer Squadron 10. After then conducting underway training in the Virginia Capes area in September and October, Arthur W. Radford accompanied the recommissioned battleship Iowa to Roosevelt Roads. She later conducted gunfire support exercises off Vieques. Returning northward the destroyer took part in exercises off the coast of North Carolina before reaching to Norfolk on 20 November.

== Fourth deployment and interim ==
After local operations, Arthur W. Radford sailed for a deployment with the Middle East Force (MidEastFor) on 4 February 1985, in company with Barney. Rendezvousing with Antrim and Charles F. Adams near Bermuda two days later, and refueling from USNS Waccamaw, the destroyer reached Rota on 16 February. She then visited Naples before heading for Egypt to transit the Suez Canal on 27 February 1985.

The destroyer touched briefly at Raysut, Oman, on 8 March before transiting the Strait of Hormuz the following day and entering the Persian Gulf. After touching briefly at Bahrain Arthur W. Radford got underway on 14 March for the Persian Gulf radar picket station. Five days into her time on station, she responded to a "Mayday" from the Liberian-flag tanker Caribbean Breeze which had been attacked and set afire in the central Persian Gulf. The destroyer provided medical advice over the emergency radio channel and launched a helicopter to render assistance.

Refueling on 25 March at Sitrah Anchorage, Bahrain, Arthur W. Radford got underway to resume her radar picket duty later the same day, remaining employed thus until she moored alongside La Salle for availability. The destroyer resumed steaming on radar picket station again on 8 April, also conducting surveillance operations simultaneously.

Arthur W. Radford embarked Rear Admiral John Addams, Commander, Middle East Force, on 17 April, and served as his flagship until 5 June. During that time, the destroyer served twice on radar picket duties in the Persian Gulf, the first from 17 to 26 April and the second from 23 to 29 June, and once on routine cruising. She visited the Sitrah anchorage twice during this period, and visited Manama, Bahrain, twice.

After Rear Admiral Addams shifted his flag from Arthur W. Radford, the ship served two more tours of radar picket duty in the Persian Gulf from 6 to 16 June and 20 to 29 June. During the first of these periods, on 7 June, the destroyer's embarked Sikorsky SH-3 "Sea King" helicopter from squadron HS-1 transported a civilian rescued from drowning and in need of medical attention to Bahrain hospital, saving the person's life.

Arthur W. Radford underwent her final upkeep in the Persian Gulf at Mina Sulman, Manama, Bahrain, from 29 June to 4 July observing Independence Day there before getting underway that afternoon to transit the Persian Gulf for the Strait of Hormuz. She conducted turnover to the destroyer Comte de Grasse the following day, and exited from the gulf.

Stopping for fuel at Mina Raysut, Oman, on 8 July, Arthur W. Radford transited the Strait of Bab-el-Mandeb in company with Antrim on 10 July, and the two warships conducted freedom of navigation operations off the coast of the People's Democratic Republic of Yemen on 11 July. The destroyer transited the Suez Canal on 14 July, and replenished from the oiler USNS Neosho that same day. Fueling from USNS Truckee the following day, Arthur W. Radford conducted a port visit to Benidorm, Spain, from 20 to 23 July before reaching Rota on 24 July. Proceeding thence with Antrim, Barney, and Charles F. Adams, the destroyer sailed for Norfolk on 24 July. After visiting Ponta Delgada, Azores, and Bermuda en route, Arthur W. Radford reached her home port on 5 August 1985.

The destroyer remained at Norfolk into late October, preparing for a command inspection and operating locally in the Virginia Capes operating area. Early in this period, Hurricane Gloria prompted Arthur W. Radford to depart Norfolk on 13 September 1985, and proceed to the upper Chesapeake Bay anchorage to ride out the storm. The destroyer returned to her home port on 21 September.

Departing Norfolk on 25 October, Arthur W. Radford sailed for Nova Scotia, and arrived at Halifax on 28 October. After being briefed for her participation in an exercise, SHAREM 62, the ship departed Halifax on the following day for Notre Dame Bay Newfoundland. Transiting the Strait of Belle Isle on 31 October Arthur W. Radford reached her destination on 1 November, and took part in SHAREM 62 until 6 November, when she sailed for Halifax.

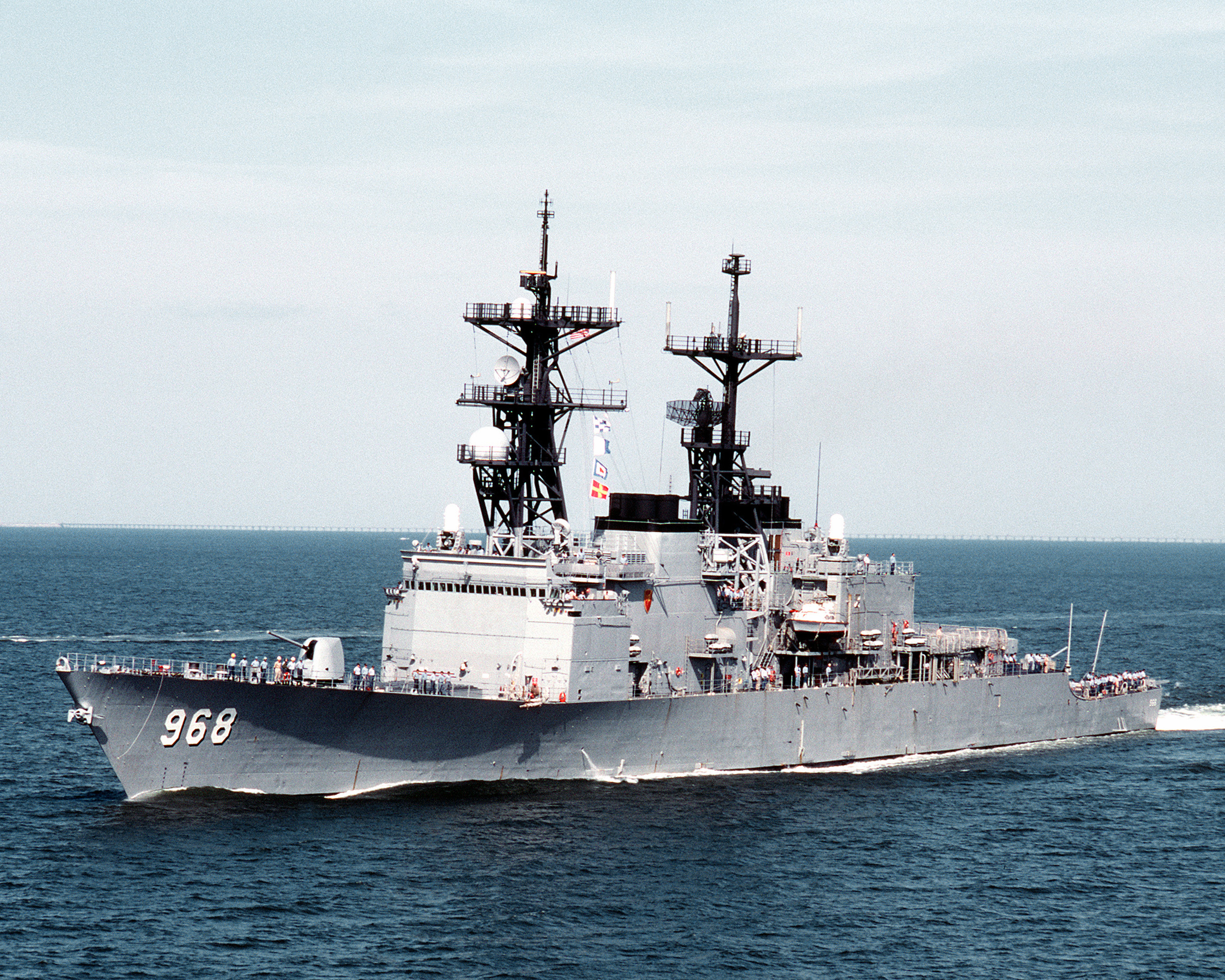
Arthur W. Radford underway near Norfolk after VLS installation, 1990.

Following the post-exercise debriefing, Arthur W. Radford sailed for Norfolk, arriving at her home port on 13 November. Moving up the eastern seaboard, the destroyer visited Boston, Massachusetts (5 to 8 December) before spending a brief period at Newport serving as Surface Warfare Officer School school ship from 9 to 12 December. Arthur W. Radford then returned to the Norfolk area, unloading weapons at Naval Weapons Station Yorktown from 15 to 18 December before conducting a dependents' cruise on 18 December.

The destroyer underwent a restricted availability until late March 1986, running her post-repair trials on 29 and 30 March before proceeding to Yorktown to take on weapons. Arthur W. Radford operated locally out of Norfolk into late July, interspersing this work with a drydocking in Sustain from 30 May to 17 June, for repairs to her struts and stern tubes, as well as an inspection of her sonar dome. Following refresher training in Guantanamo Bay, the ship touched at Roosevelt Roads before operating at Vieques for gunfire support practice, surface gunnery exercises, and missile shoots. After visiting Fort Lauderdale, and Florida en route, the ship returned to Norfolk on 12 September.

Arthur W. Radford returned to Guantanamo Bay soon thereafter to embark HSL-36, detachment 6, and then proceeded to Roosevelt Roads, where she arrived on 6 October to load ammunition, to take on fuel, and to embark a Coast Guard law enforcement detachment along with Commander, Caribbean Squadron and his staff. The ship operated in her assigned waters from 6 to 19 October, returning to Roosevelt Roads to debark Commander, Caribbean Squadron and his staff.

Detaching the Coast Guardsmen at Nassau, Bahamas, on 22 October at the commencement of the ship's port visit there, Arthur W. Radford sailed for Norfolk on 25 October, arriving two days later. As before, her stay in port proved brief, for she got underway on 3 November for the Bermuda operating area for exercises. One day out of Norfolk, she assisted Preble in searching for a crewman who had been lost in the Cape Hatteras area.

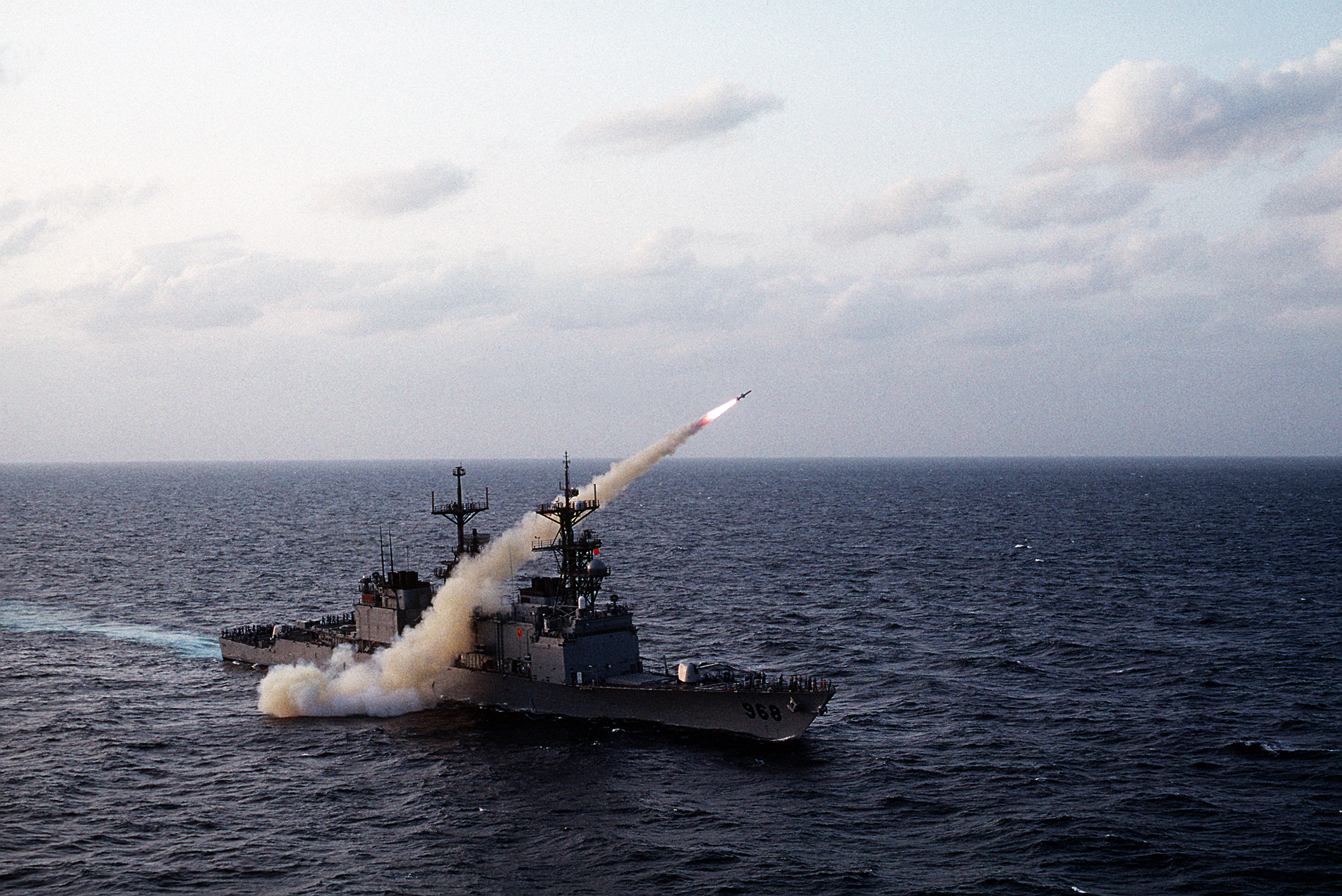
Arthur W. Radford fires a Harpoon missile during operation Red Reef III, 1992.

Arthur W. Radford conducted her exercises, SHAREM 1-87, before returning to Norfolk on 16 November. With the exception of a period underway in the Virginia Capes operating area on 9 and 10 December, Arthur W. Radford spent the month of December in port in Norfolk. In early 1987, the ship participated in a major FLEETEX and other exercises, and from 20 July to 10 December 1987, the ship took part in UNITAS XXVIII.

A vertical launching system (VLS) was installed in January 1990 during a major overhaul at Avondale Shipyard. On 26 September 1991, the ship departed for a six-month deployment to the Persian Gulf with the Dwight D. Eisenhower battle group, returning 26 March 1992. It was her first deployment in five years.

The ship deployed to the Mediterranean sea in 1994 and in 1996. The ship and crew received awards for service relating to Bosnia during both deployments.

== Later career and collision ==
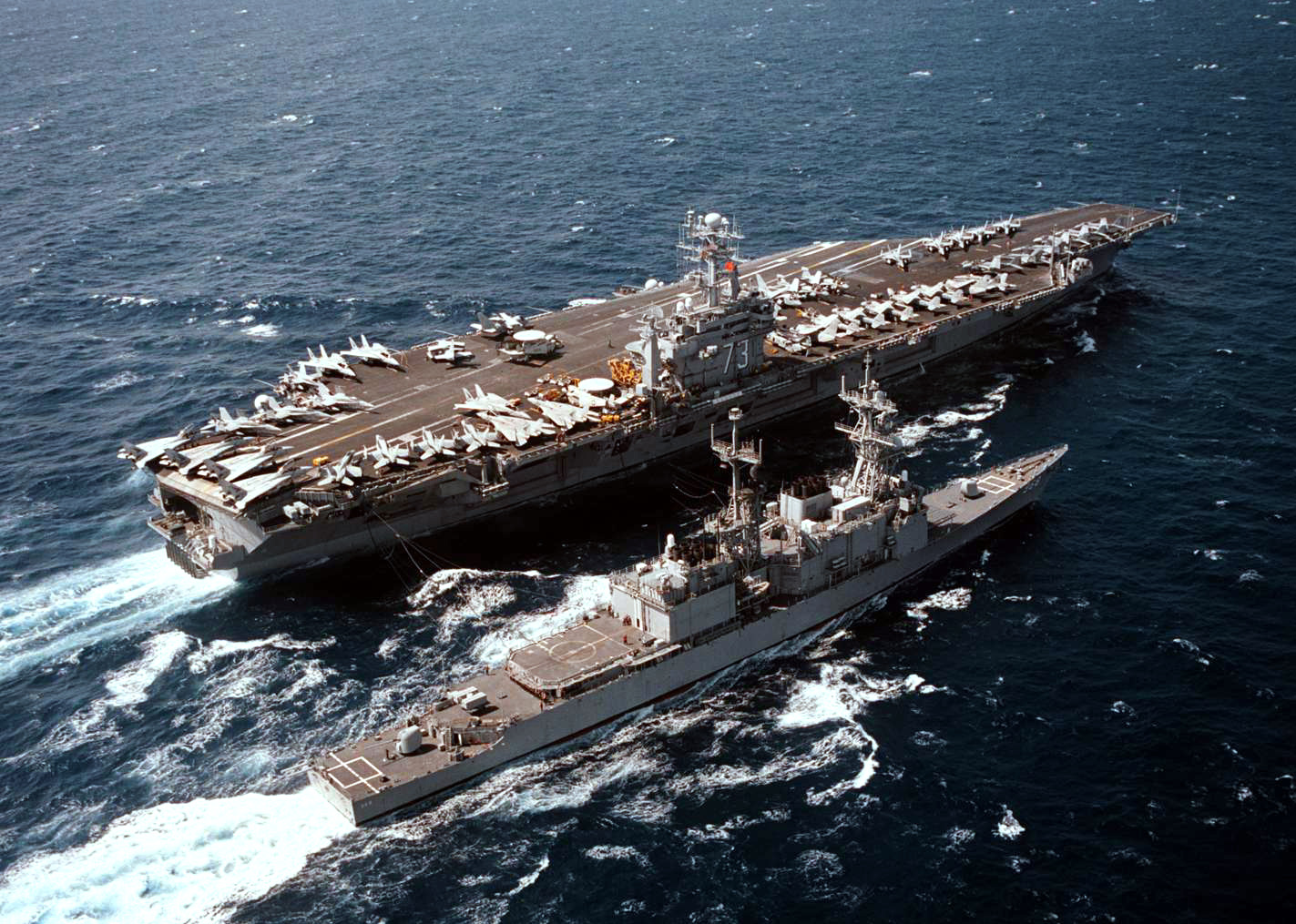
Arthur W. Radford replenishes from USS George Washington (CVN-73) in the Mediterranean in 1996.

As of 31 August 1995, Arthur W. Radford was to become part of Destroyer Squadron 26.

In May 1997, Arthur W. Radford received the first shipboard installation of the Advanced Enclosed Mast/Sensor System which fully integrates advanced materials, structures, and manufacturing technologies with sensor technology, electromagnetics, and signature reduction to achieve improved warfighting capabilities.

On 4 February 1999 at about 23:34, Arthur W. Radford collided with the Saudi Riyadh, (IMO number: 7900053) a 29,259-ton, 656-foot (200 m)-long, roll-on/roll-off container ship, which was preparing to enter the Chesapeake Bay bound for Baltimore. According to the Navy, Arthur W. Radford was conducting calibration tests on electronic warfare equipment at the time of the collision. As a part of that test, the ship had been sailing in circles around an electronic buoy for six hours prior to the collision. Saudi Riyadh, meanwhile, was approaching the Chesapeake Bay from the northeast, preparing to line up in the shipping lanes before taking on a marine pilot for its eventual trip to Baltimore.

When the two ships collided, Saudi Riyadh's bow struck the starboard side of Arthur W. Radford, about 30 feet (9 m) behind its bow. Saudi Riyadh sustained a four-foot-high, 30-foot (9 m)-long gash along the port and starboard sides of its bow, with most of the damage to its port side. Arthur W. Radford, more heavily damaged, sustained a deep gash on its starboard side, penetrating nearly 25 feet (8 m) into the main deck, ripping a pie-shaped gash and penetrating into the centerline of Arthur W. Radford. A hole ran from the deck to the waterline. The collision toppled its 5-inch 54-caliber gun and damaged Tomahawk cruise missile tubes. One sailor aboard suffered a broken arm, and 12 more had various injuries. The ship entered Norfolk Naval Shipyard Drydock #3 25 February 1999.

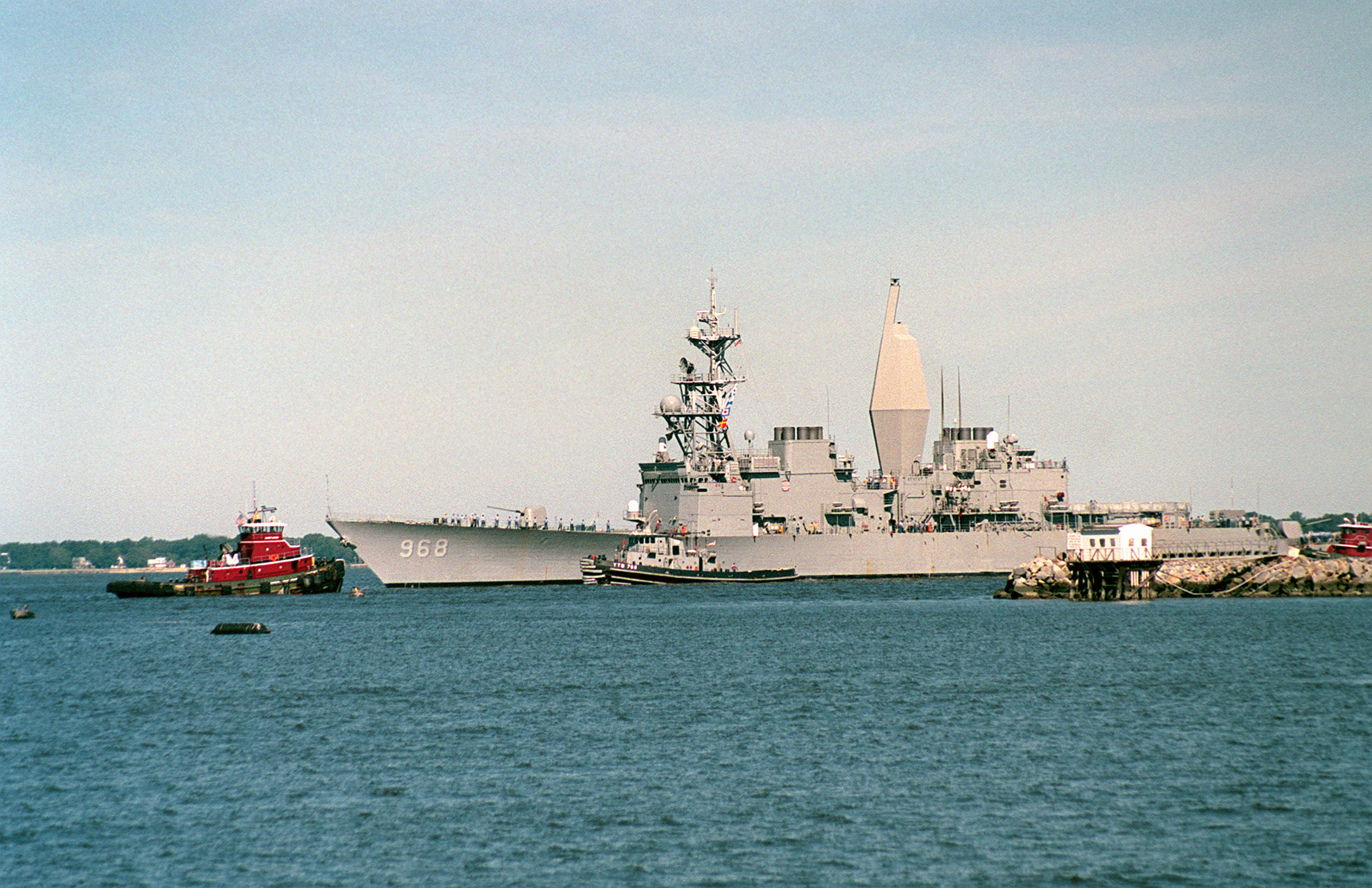
Arthur W. Radford returning to duty following collision repairs, September 1999.

Arthur W. Radford sustained an estimated $32.7 million in damages and the damage prevented the ship from leaving 26 March on a scheduled six-month deployment to the Mediterranean Sea with the carrier Theodore Roosevelt battle group. Repairs aboard Arthur W. Radford were completed on 13 September and the destroyer then deployed with the Eisenhower battle group. As a result of the collision, the commanding officer was relieved 13 February 1999. In June 2000, a US court affixed liability at 65% Saudi Riyadh / 35% Arthur W. Radford. Neither the US Navy commanding officer nor the cargo ship's master were on the bridge or consulted prior to the collision.

Arthur W. Radford deployed to the Mediterranean Sea and Persian Gulf 3 April to 1 October 2000.

== Decommissioning and fate ==
Arthur W. Radford was decommissioned 18 March 2003, then stricken from the Naval Vessel Register on 6 April 2004 and eventually assigned to the Inactive Ship Maintenance Facility at Philadelphia, Pennsylvania. On 8 June 2010, the ex-Arthur W. Radford was transferred to the State of Delaware for preparation for eventual sinking as an artificial reef onto the Del-Jersey-Land Inshore Reef site on a project led by Captain Tim Mullane of The American Marine Group (38°31′N 74°31′W), about 30 nmi (56 km) southeast of Cape May, New Jersey, and northeast of Ocean City, Maryland.

After being scuttled on 10 August 2011, the ship became part of the largest artificial reef on the U.S. East Coast and the longest vessel to be used for this purpose in the Atlantic.

== Gallery ==
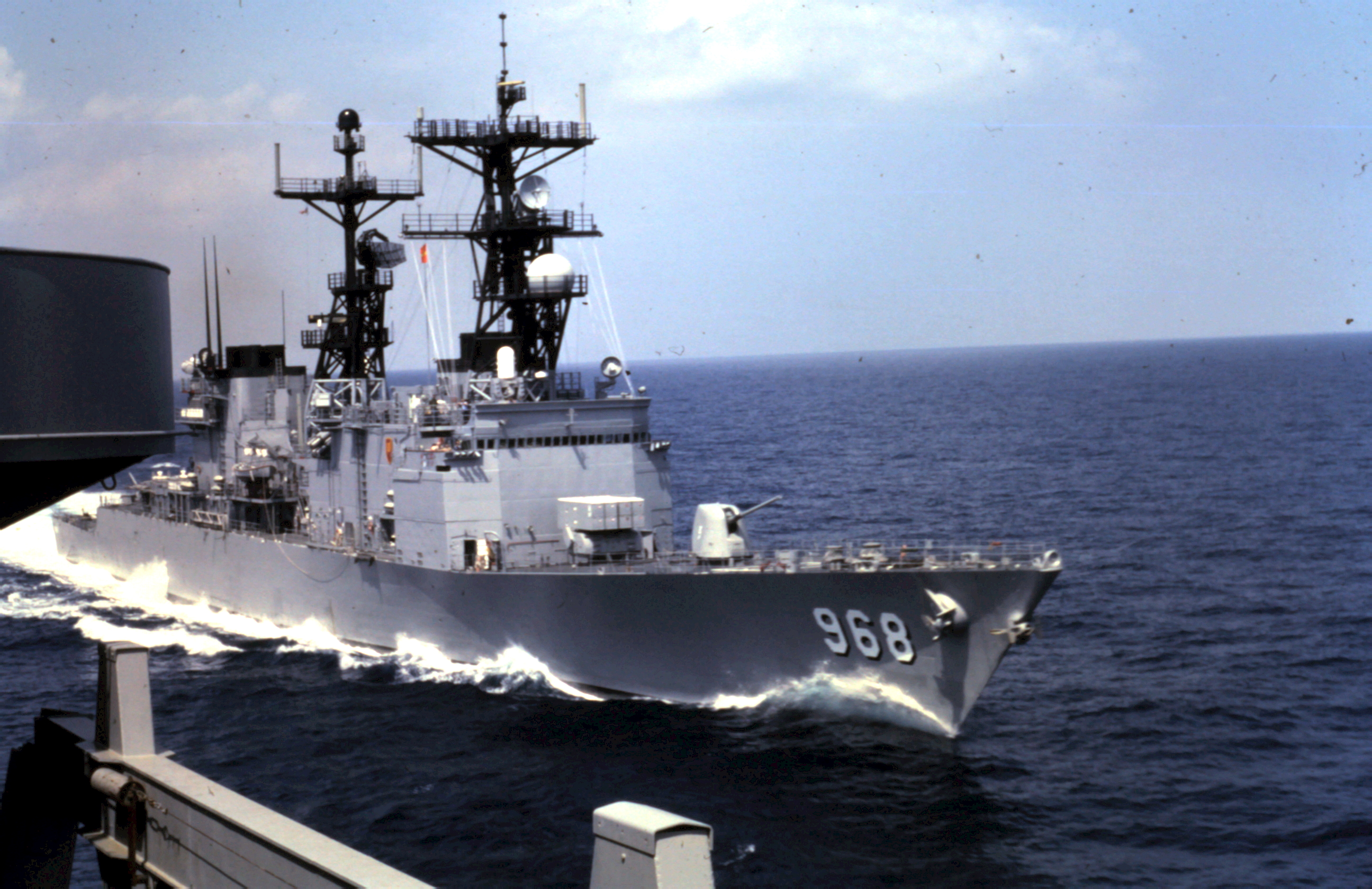
USS Arthur W. Radford in the Mediterranean Sea, 1983

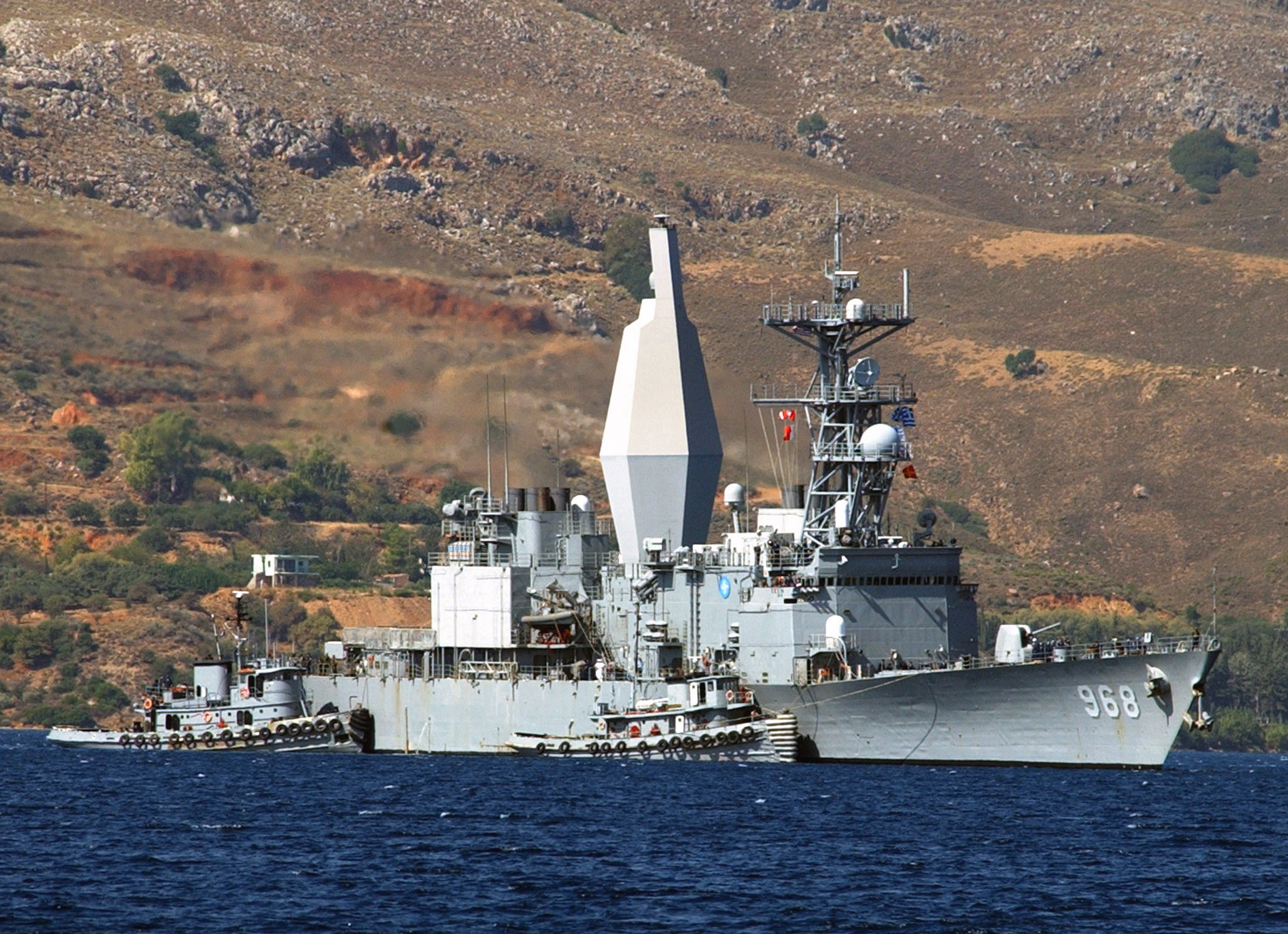
USS Arthur W. Radford arrives in Crete on 30 August 2002

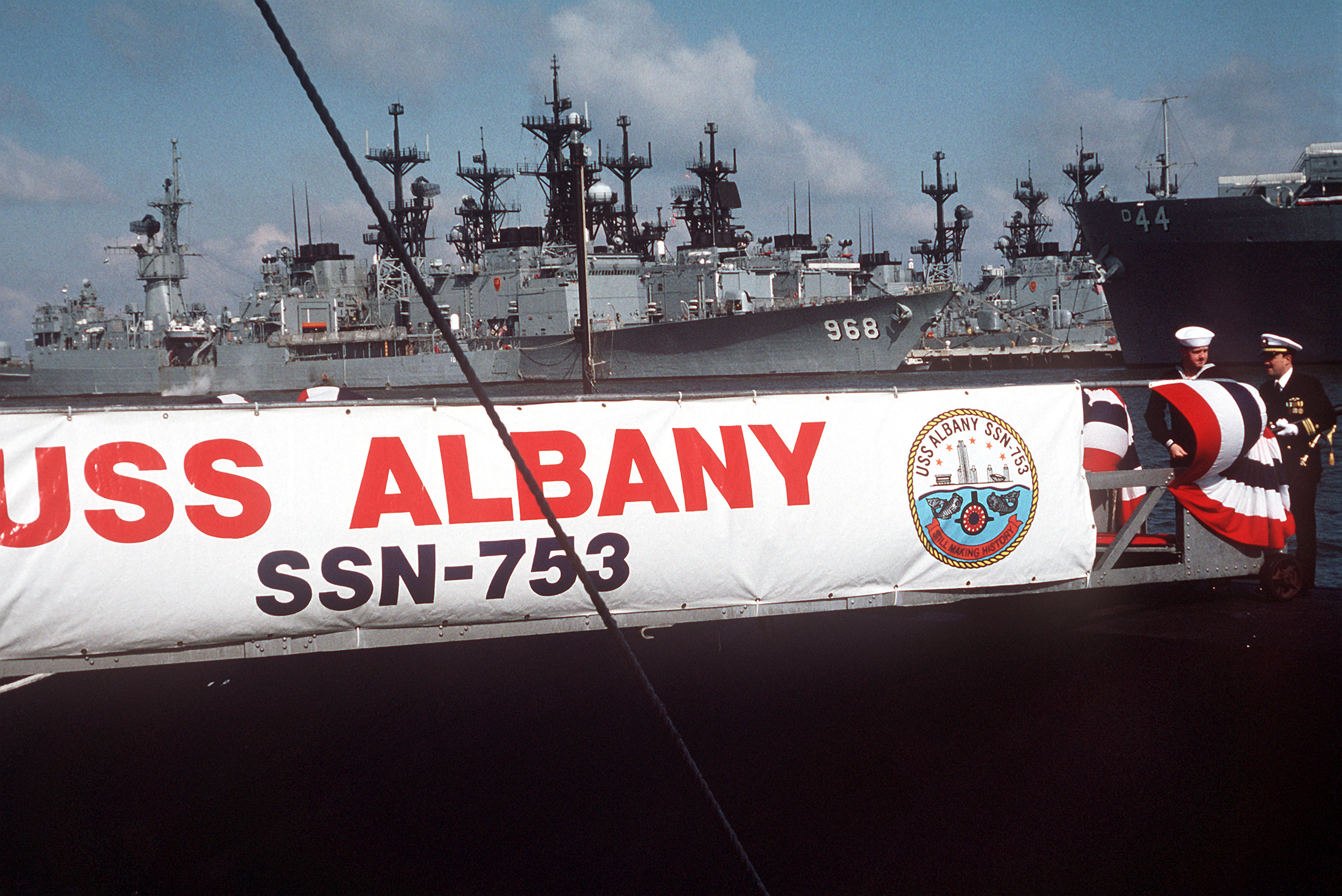
USS Arthur W. Radford behind USS Albany on 7 April 1990

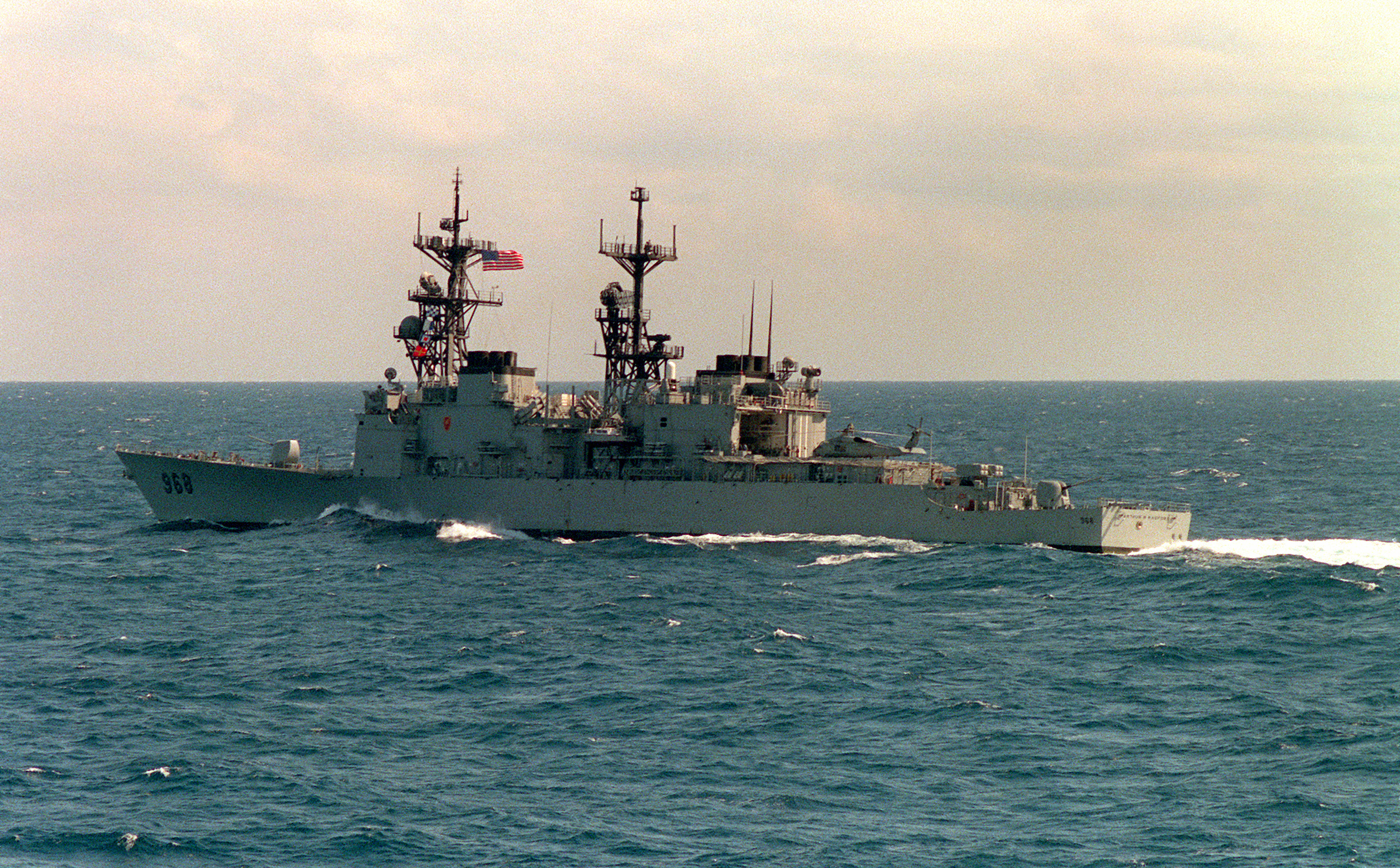
USS Arthur W. Radford in 1992

== Awards ==
From the Navy Unit Award website:

- Navy Expeditionary Medal, 20-May-1983 to 27-May-1983, Lebanon
- Navy Unit Commendation, 28-May-1983 to 19-Nov-1983
- Armed Forces Expeditionary Medal, 05-Jun-1983 to 07-Jun-1983, Lebanon
- Armed Forces Expeditionary Medal, 27-Jul-1983 to 29-Jul-1983, Lebanon
- Armed Forces Expeditionary Medal, 17-Sep-1983 to 27-Sep-1983, Lebanon
- Coast Guard Unit Commendation, 01-Nov-1985 to 28-Feb-1986
- Coast Guard Meritorious Unit Commendation, 01-Oct-1986 to 30-Jun-1987
- Southwest Asia Service Medal, 13-Oct-1991 to 07-Mar-1992
- Navy E Ribbon, 01-Jan-1992 to 31-Dec-1992
- Navy E Ribbon, 01-Jan-1994 to 31-Dec-1994
- Armed Forces Service Medal, 09-Jul-1994 to 13-Aug-1994, Bosnia
- Armed Forces Service Medal, 17-Feb-1996 to 26-Feb-1996, Bosnia
- Armed Forces Service Medal, 14-May-1996 to 22-May-1996, Bosnia
- Armed Forces Service Medal, 28-May-1996 to 29-May-1996, Bosnia
- Meritorious Unit Commendation, as part of the Dwight D. Eisenhower battle group, 01-Jan-1999 to 10-Sep-2001
- Armed Forces Expeditionary Medal, 20-May-2000 to 30-Jul-2000, coded "V. Bosnia"
- Meritorious Unit Commendation, as part of TF 60, 01-Apr-2002 to 30-Sep-2002, Iraqi Freedom

== See also ==
- List of United States Navy destroyers
- USS Radford, for ships with similar names.
