= USS New Orleans =

USS New Orleans may refer to:

- USS New Orleans (1815), was a ship-of-the-line laid down in January 1815 but her construction was halted and she remained on the stocks, housed over, until sold in September 1883
- USS New Orleans (CL-22), was a New Orleans-class (1896) protected cruiser commissioned in 1898, decommissioned in 1922, and served during both the Spanish–American War and World War I
- USS New Orleans (CA-32), was a New Orleans-class (1931) heavy cruiser commissioned in 1934, decommissioned in 1947, and saw much service in World War II
- USS New Orleans (LPH-11), was an Iwo Jima-class amphibious assault ship commissioned in 1968, decommissioned in 1997, and sunk as a target in 2010. She was a recovery ship for Project Apollo and was used in the filming of the movie Apollo 13
- USS New Orleans (LPD-18), is a San Antonio-class amphibious transport dock commissioned in 2007 and currently in active service

== See also ==
- CSS New Orleans was a floating gun battery on the Mississippi River in the service of the Confederate States of America.
