= Faramarz (disambiguation) =

Faramarz (Persian: فرامرز) was one of Iranian pahlavans (heroes) in Shahnameh and the son of Rostam.

Faramarz may also refer to:

- Faramarz-nama, a Persian epic recounting the adventures of Faramarz
- Faramarz (given name)
- Faramarz, Iran, a village
- Faramarz Kola, a village in Iran
- Faramarz, former name of Iranian frigate Sahand

== See also ==
- Faramarzi (disambiguation)
