= IRIS Sahand (1969) =

British-made Iranian light frigate

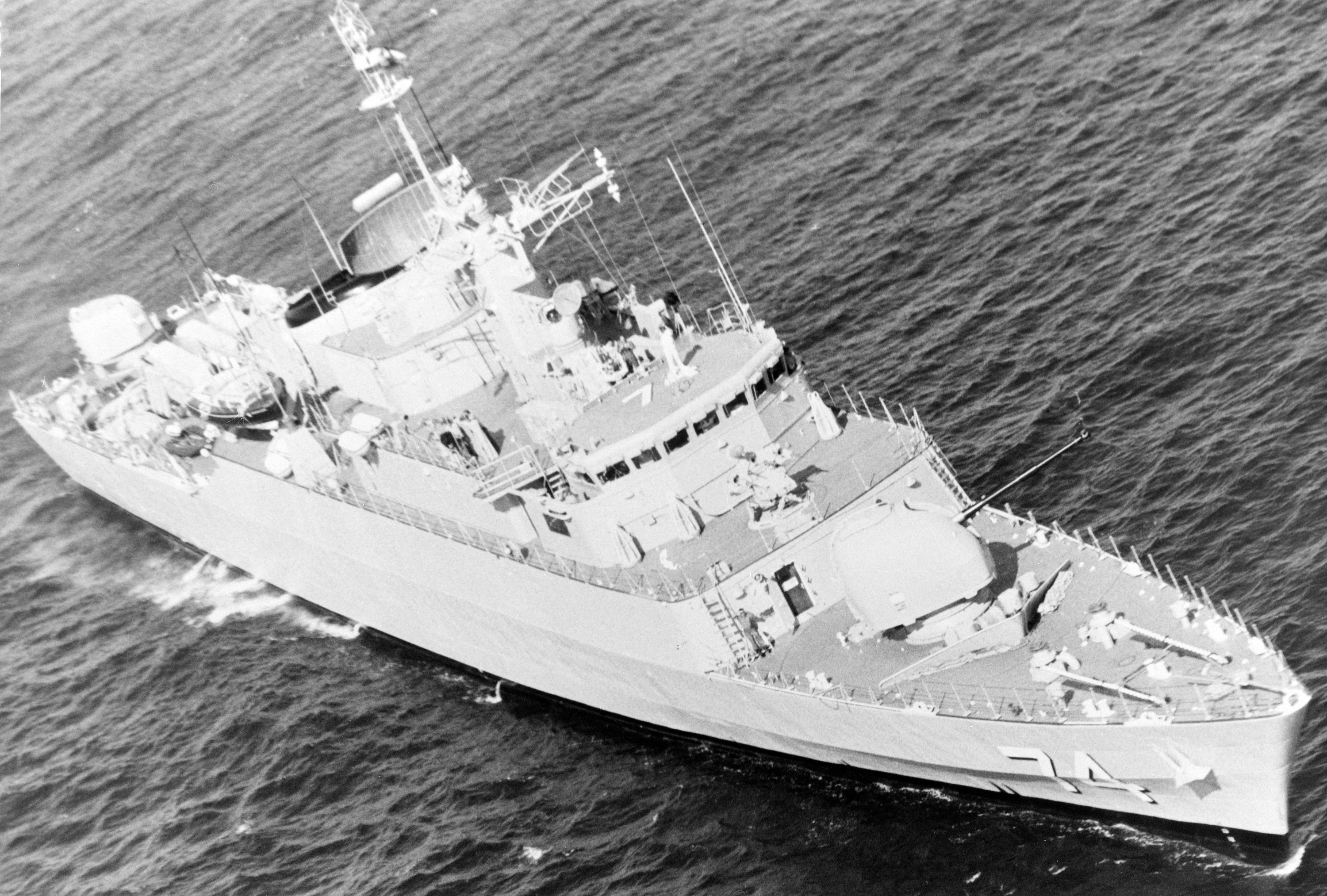
- A starboard bow view of the Iranian destroyer escort ITS Faramarz (DE 74), redesignated as IRS Sahand (F 74)

History

Iran
- Name: IIS Faramarz
- Namesake: Faramarz
- Ordered: 1960
- Builder: Vosper Thornycroft, Woolston
- Yard number: 1080
- Launched: 30 July 1969; 57 years ago.
- Commissioned: February 1972
- Renamed: Sahand, 1985
- Namesake: Sahand volcano
- Home port: Bandar-Abbas
- Fate: Sunk in Operation Praying Mantis, 18 April 1988

General characteristics
- Class & type: Alvand-class frigate
- Displacement: 1,100 tons (1,540 tons full load)
- Length: 94.5 m (310 ft)
- Beam: 11.07 m (36.3 ft)
- Draught: 3.25 m (10.7 ft)
- Propulsion: 2 shafts, 2 Paxman Ventura cruising diesels, 3,800 bhp (2,830 kW), 17 knots; 2 Rolls-Royce Olympus TM2 boost gas turbines, 46,000 shp (34,300 kW), 39 knots (72 km/h)
- Speed: 39 knots (72 km/h) max
- Range: 5,000 nmi (9,000 km) at 15 knots (28 km/h)
- Complement: 125-146
- Armament: 5 × Sea Killer anti-ship missiles; 1 × 4.5 inch (114 mm) Mark 8 gun; 1 × twin 35 mm AAA, 2 × single 20 mm AAA; 2 × 81 mm mortars; 2 × 0.50 cal (12.7 mm) machine guns; 1 × Limbo ASW mortar; 2 × triple 12.75 in torpedo tubes

IRIS Sahand (Persian: سهند) was a British-made Vosper Mark V class frigate (also known as the Alvand class) commissioned as part of a four-ship order. She was launched in 1969. The ship was originally called Faramarz, named after a character in Ferdowsi's Shahnameh. After the 1979 Islamic Revolution she was renamed Sahand, after the Sahand volcano.

== Construction ==
On 10 May 1970, she was damaged by fire while fitting out.

== Service history ==
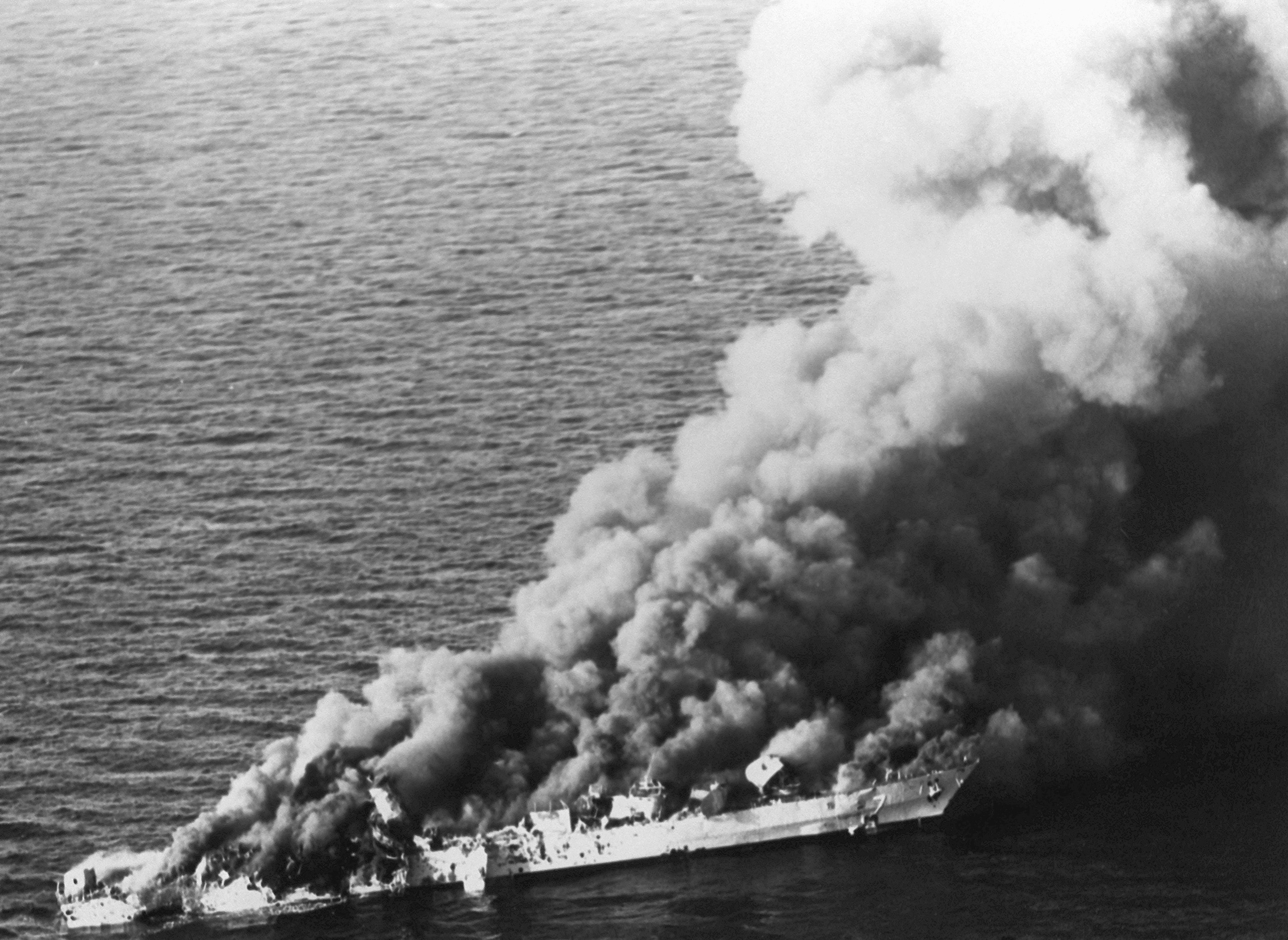
Sahand burns after strikes by U.S. Navy ships and aircraft on 18 April 1988.

The Iranian Navy ship was sunk in Operation Praying Mantis on 18 April 1988. Located by two American A-6E Intruders of Attack Squadron VA-95 steaming roughly 16 kilometres (10 mi) southwest of Larak Island, she was hit by two Harpoon missiles and four AGM-123 Skipper II laser-guided missiles. A pair of Rockeye cluster bombs from the aircraft and a single Harpoon from the destroyer USS Joseph Strauss finished the destruction of the ship.

Left heavily aflame, dead in the water and listing to port, Sahand burned for several hours before fires reached her ammunition magazines and they detonated, sinking her in over 660 feet (200 metres) of water southwest of Larak Island. Forty-five members of her crew were killed.

== See also ==
- List of ships sunk by missiles
- List of Imperial Iranian Navy vessels in 1979
