= Alvand-class frigate =

Class of frigates of the Islamic Republic of Iran Navy

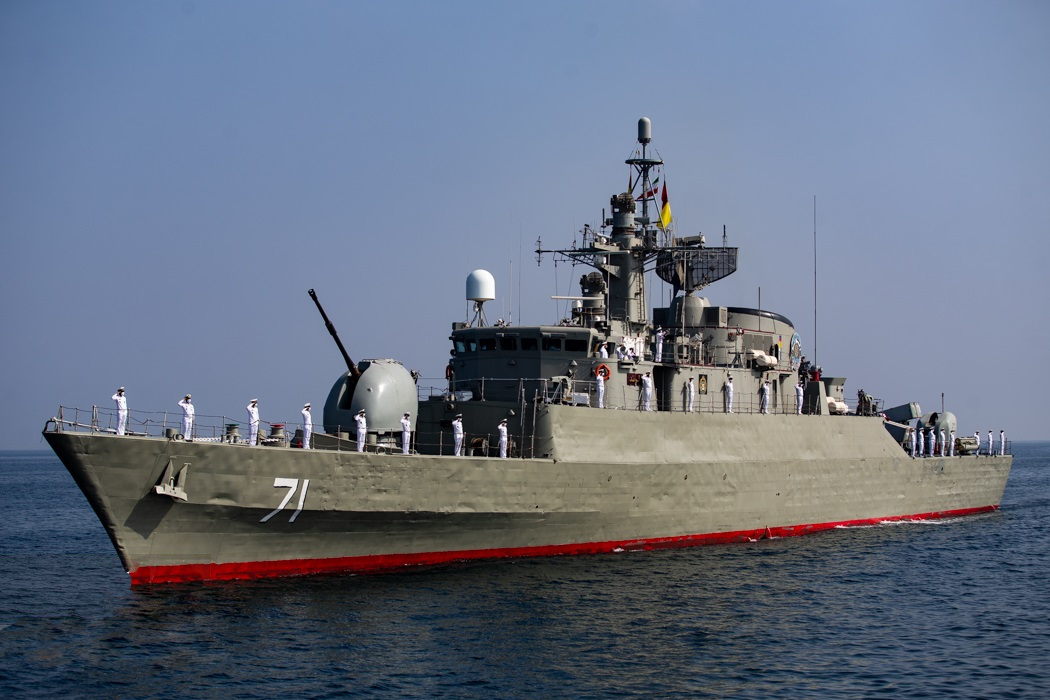
- IRIS Alvand

Class overview
- Name: Alvand / Saam class
- Builders: Vosper Thornycroft, Vickers
- Operators: Imperial Iranian Navy; Islamic Republic of Iran Navy
- Succeeded by: Moudge class
- Built: 1968–1972
- In service: 1971–2026
- Completed: 4
- Active: 0
- Lost: 4

General characteristics
- Type: Frigate
- Displacement: 1,100 tons (1,540 tons full load)
- Length: 94.5 m (310 ft)
- Beam: 11.07 m (36.3 ft)
- Draught: 3.25 m (10.7 ft)
- Propulsion: 2 Paxman Ventura cruising diesels 3,800 bhp (2,800 kW), and 2 Rolls-Royce Olympus TM2 boost gas turbines 46,000 shp (34,000 kW) on 2 shafts
- Speed: 17 knots (31 km/h) on diesels; 39 knots (72 km/h) on gas turbines
- Range: 5,000 nmi (9,000 km) at 15 knots (28 km/h)
- Complement: 125-146
- Armament: 4 × C-802 anti-ship missiles; 1 × 4.5 in (114 mm) Mark 8 gun; 1 × twin 35 mm (1.4 in) AA guns; 2 × single 20 mm (0.79 in) guns; 2 × 81 mm (3 in) mortars; 2 × 0.50 cal machine guns; 1 × Limbo ASW mortar; 2 × triple 12.75 in (324 mm) torpedo tubes

The Alvand class (Persian: کلاس الوند), or Saam class (Persian: کلاس سام) (also known as the Vosper Mark V class) was originally a class of four frigates built for the Imperial Iranian Navy. They were renamed following the Iranian Revolution, and served in the Islamic Republic of Iran Navy during the Iran–Iraq War.

IRIS Sahand was sunk by the U.S. Navy during Operation Praying Mantis in 1988. All the remaining vessels were sunk during the 2026 Iran war.

== Development and construction ==
The ships were built in the United Kingdom by Vosper Ltd and based on their Mark 5 design with the following arms & equipment:

- ASuW – 1 × quintuple Sea Killer Mk2 surface-to-surface missile
- AAW – 1 × triple Sea Cat surface-to-air missile launcher
- ASW – 1 × 3 barrelled Anti Submarine Mortar Mark 10 Limbo launcher
- Guns – 1 × Mark 8 Mod 0 4.5 inch general purpose & 1 × twin 35mm Oerlikon AA
- Electronics – Plessey AWS 1 air surveillance radar with on-mounted IFF; 2 × Contraves Seahunter systems (For use with Sea cat, Sea Killer & the 35mm mount); Decca RDL 1 passive direction finding equipment

They were refitted in the UK shortly before the 1979 Iranian Revolution.

== History ==
The ships were originally named after characters from Ferdowsi's Shahnameh. After the Islamic Revolution, they were renamed after mountains in Iran.

They saw action during the "Tanker War" phase of the Iran–Iraq War and proved effective against Iraqi forces. After one was sunk and another damaged during Operation Praying Mantis in 1988 they saw little further use, as the Iranian Navy proved no match for the U.S. Navy.

An Alvand-class frigate in port at Konarak, Iran was reported to have been struck from the air during the 2026 Iran war.

== Upgrades ==
The Sea Killer missiles were replaced by Chinese made C-802s in the 1990s. The Sea Cats were replaced by the addition of a 20 mm (0.79 in) AA gun.

Two triple 12.75-inch (324 mm) torpedo tubes, two 81 mm (3 in) mortars and two 0.50 caliber machine guns were also fitted.

== Successors ==
The Moudge-class frigate is a modified Iranian-built version of the Alvand class, with three either in service or under construction.

== Ships in class ==
Ships in the class
Image	Ship	Pennant number	Builder	Laid down	Launched	Commissioned	Status
IRIS Alvand	Alvand (ex-Saam)	71 (ex DE 12)	Vosper Thornycroft	3 March 1968	25 July 1968	May 1971	Sunk during the 2026 attack on Bandar Abbas.
IRIS Alborz	Alborz (ex-Zaal)	72 (ex DE 14)	Vickers	3 March 1968	4 March 1969	1 March 1971	Destroyed. As of 12 May 2026, high res satellite confirms it was destroyed in dry dock.
IRIS Sabalan	Sabalan (ex-Rostam)	73 (ex DE 16)	Vickers		4 March 1969	26 May 1972	Sunk during the 2026 attack on Bandar Abbas.
IRIS Sahand	Sahand (ex-Faramarz)	74 (ex DE 18)	Vosper Thornycroft		30 July 1969	February 1972	Sunk on 18 April 1988 during Operation Praying Mantis. Its name was later reused for IRIS Sahand.

== See also ==
- Islamic Republic of Iran Navy
- Current Iranian Navy vessels

== Sources ==
- https://web.archive.org/web/20160303224923/http://www.iinavy.org/faramarz.htm
- http://www.mafhoum.com/press8/237P2.pdf
- https://web.archive.org/web/20041222105239/http://www.ii.uj.edu.pl/~artur/enc/F2.htm
