= Faramarzi (disambiguation) =

Faramarzi (Persian: فرامرزی) is a village in Iran. Faramarzi may also refer to:

- Abdolrahman Faramarzi, Iranian journalist, writer, educator, deputy of parliament and poet
- Aqa Baba-ye Faramarzi, a village in Iran
- Mazeh Faramarzi, a village in Iran
- Mohammad Ali Faramarzi, Iranian football defender
- Qaleh-ye Faramarzi, a village in Iran

== See also ==
- Faramarz (disambiguation)
