= Faramarz (given name) =

Faramarz (Persian: فرامرز) is a Persian masculine given name that may refer to

- Faramarz Asadi (1869-1969), Kurdish leader and tribal chief in Iran and Iraq
- Faramarz Asef (born 1950), Iranian triple jumper
- Faramarz Aslani (1954–2024), Iranian singer, guitarist, composer, songwriter, and producer
- Faramarz Fekr, American engineer
- Faramarz Gharibian (born 1941), Iranian actor and director
- Faramarz Khodnegah (born 1965), Iranian strongman and powerlifter
- Faramarz Payvar (1933–2009), Iranian composer and santur player
- Faramarz Pilaram (1937–1983), Iranian painter
- Faramarz Tamanna (born 1977), Afghan politician
- Faramarz Vakili (born 1987), Iranian film director, writer and producer
- Faramarz Zelli (1942-2025), Iranian football player
