= USS Joseph Strauss =

Charles F. Adams-class destroyer

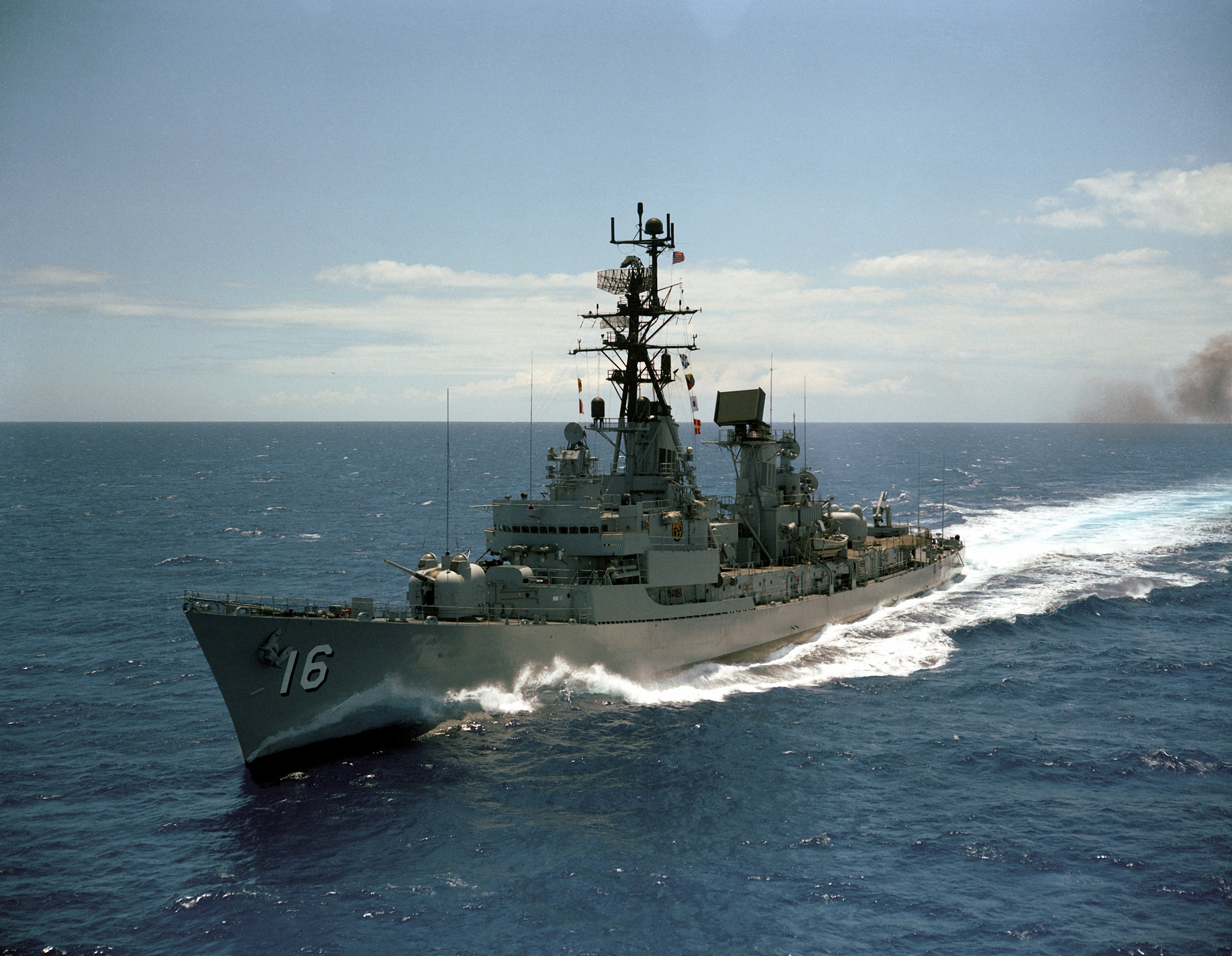
- USS Joseph Strauss underway in 1968

History

United States
- Name: Joseph Strauss
- Namesake: Admiral Joseph Strauss
- Ordered: 21 July 1959
- Builder: New York Shipbuilding Corporation
- Laid down: 27 December 1960
- Launched: 9 December 1961
- Acquired: 29 March 1963
- Commissioned: 20 April 1963
- Decommissioned: 1 February 1990
- Stricken: 11 January 1995
- Identification: Callsign: NZSR; Hull number: DDG-16
- Motto: Promptus ad Agendum; (Ready to act)
- Fate: Sold to Greece, 1 October 1992

Greece
- Name: Formion
- Namesake: Phormio
- Commissioned: 1 October 1992
- Decommissioned: 29 July 2002
- Identification: Hull number: D220
- Fate: Scrapped, 19 February 2004

General characteristics
- Class & type: Charles F. Adams-class destroyer
- Displacement: 3,277 tons standard, 4,526 full load
- Length: 437 ft (133 m)
- Beam: 47 ft (14 m)
- Draft: 15 ft (4.6 m)
- Propulsion: 2 × General Electric steam turbines providing 70,000 shp (52 MW); 2 shafts; 4 × Combustion Engineering 1,275 psi (8,790 kPa) boilers
- Speed: 33 knots (61 km/h; 38 mph)
- Range: 4,500 nautical miles (8,300 km) at 20 knots (37 km/h)
- Complement: 354 (24 officers, 330 enlisted)
- Sensors & processing systems: AN/SPS-39 3D air search radar; AN/SPS-10 surface search radar; AN/SPG-51 missile fire-control radar; AN/SPG-53 gunfire control radar; AN/SQS-23 sonar and the hull mounted SQQ-23 pair sonar for DDG-2 through 19; AN/SPS-40 air search radar
- Armament: 1 Mk 11 missile launcher (DDG2-14) or Mk 13 single arm missile launcher (DDG-15-24) for RIM-24 Tartar SAM system, or later the RIM-66 Standard (SM-1) and Harpoon antiship missile; 2 × 5 in (127 mm)/54 caliber Mark 42 gun; 1 × RUR-5 ASROC launcher; 6 × 12.8 in (325 mm) ASW torpedo tubes (2 x Mark 32 Surface Vessel Torpedo Tubes)

USS Joseph Strauss (DDG-16), named for Admiral Joseph Strauss, USN (1861–1948), was a Charles F. Adams-class guided-missile destroyer of the United States Navy.

Joseph Strauss's keel was laid down by the New York Shipbuilding Corporation at Camden, New Jersey, on 27 December 1960. The vessel was launched on 9 December 1961 by Mrs. Lawrence Haines Coburn, granddaughter of Admiral Joseph Strauss and commissioned on 20 April 1963.

During the Vietnam War, Joseph Strauss served as plane guard for aircraft carriers on Yankee Station in the Tonkin Gulf, participated in Sea Dragon operations, patrolled on search-and-rescue duties, and carried out naval gunfire support missions.

== Operational history ==
=== 1960s ===
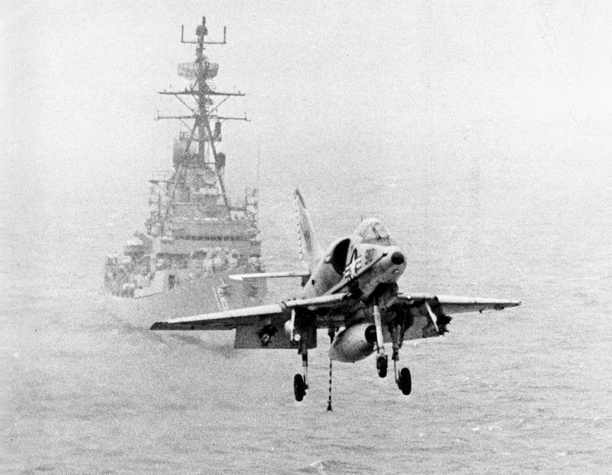
Joseph Strauss behind an A-4C Skyhawk in the 1960s

Joseph Strauss departed Philadelphia on 6 June 1963 for a brief cruise to Puerto Rico and Willemstad, Curaçao, and then transited the Panama Canal to join the Pacific Fleet on the West Coast. She arrived at Long Beach Naval Shipyard on 13 July 1963 for alterations, followed by tactics out of San Diego north to Seattle, Washington.

As flagship of Destroyer Squadron 3, Joseph Strauss sailed from Long Beach on 30 June 1964. After calling at Pearl Harbor and Midway Atoll, she arrived in Yokosuka, Japan, on 18 July. While in port at Yokosuka, the crew of Joseph Strauss learned that North Vietnamese torpedo boats had attacked the U.S. destroyer Maddox in the Gulf of Tonkin, and the ship hurried out of port with other squadron ships to join carrier forces in the South China Sea. She departed 3 August 1964 to meet off Okinawa on 6 August with the aircraft carrier Constellation. During this time, U.S. Naval aircraft from Constellation conducted air strikes over North Vietnam. She then patrolled off the Vietnam coast and the South China Sea with task forces built around Constellation, Kearsarge, and Ticonderoga. Brief sweeps were made to the Philippines and ports of Japan. Joseph Strauss arrived in Yokosuka on 15 December 1964 for upkeep, sailing again on 21 January 1965 to support U.S. forces in Vietnam until 1 March. During this period, she operated with Ranger, Hancock, Coral Sea, and Yorktown.

Following upkeep in Subic Bay from 1–10 March, Joseph Strauss sailed with ships of the Royal Thai Navy for exercises in the Gulf of Thailand. She was briefly flagship of the 7th Fleet from 22 to 26 March during the official visit of Vice Admiral Paul B. Blackburn, Jr., to Bangkok, Thailand. She departed Yokosuka on 19 April for operations that brought recognition and honor to both the ship and her crew.

From 24 April 1965, Joseph Strauss, together with Ernest G. Small, was part of the first advanced search-and-rescue/antiaircraft warfare (SAR/AAW) picket team in the Gulf of Tonkin to support U.S. air strike operations against North Vietnam. From 16 through 21 May, she observed operations of a Russian task unit. She returned to Yokosuka from 23 May to 4 June, then again sailed for the Gulf of Tonkin. Her ensuing 27 days as flagship of the SAR/AAW picket unit were highly successful, establishing operational procedures and capabilities, which remain destroyer standards. On 17 June 1965, two F4B Phantoms from USS Midway, under Joseph Strauss' advisory control, shot down two MiG-17s, accounting for the first two hostile aircraft downed by U.S. forces in aerial combat since 1953. Three days later, two propeller-driven Skyraiders, also from Midway and under Joseph Strauss' advisory air control, shot down another MiG-17. As a result, members of Strauss' combat information center team were decorated by the secretary of the Navy.

Joseph Strauss arrived in Hong Kong on 6 July 1965, putting out to sea 14 to 16 July to avoid Typhoon Freda, and again 18 to 19 July to carry the 7th Fleet Salvage Officer to Pratus Reef to assist in refloating USS Frank Knox. She departed Hong Kong 21 July for Yokosuka. The following day, she took a disabled Nationalist Chinese fishing boat in tow and delivered her safely to Keelung on 23 July, thence sailed to Yokosuka, arriving 25 July for upkeep.

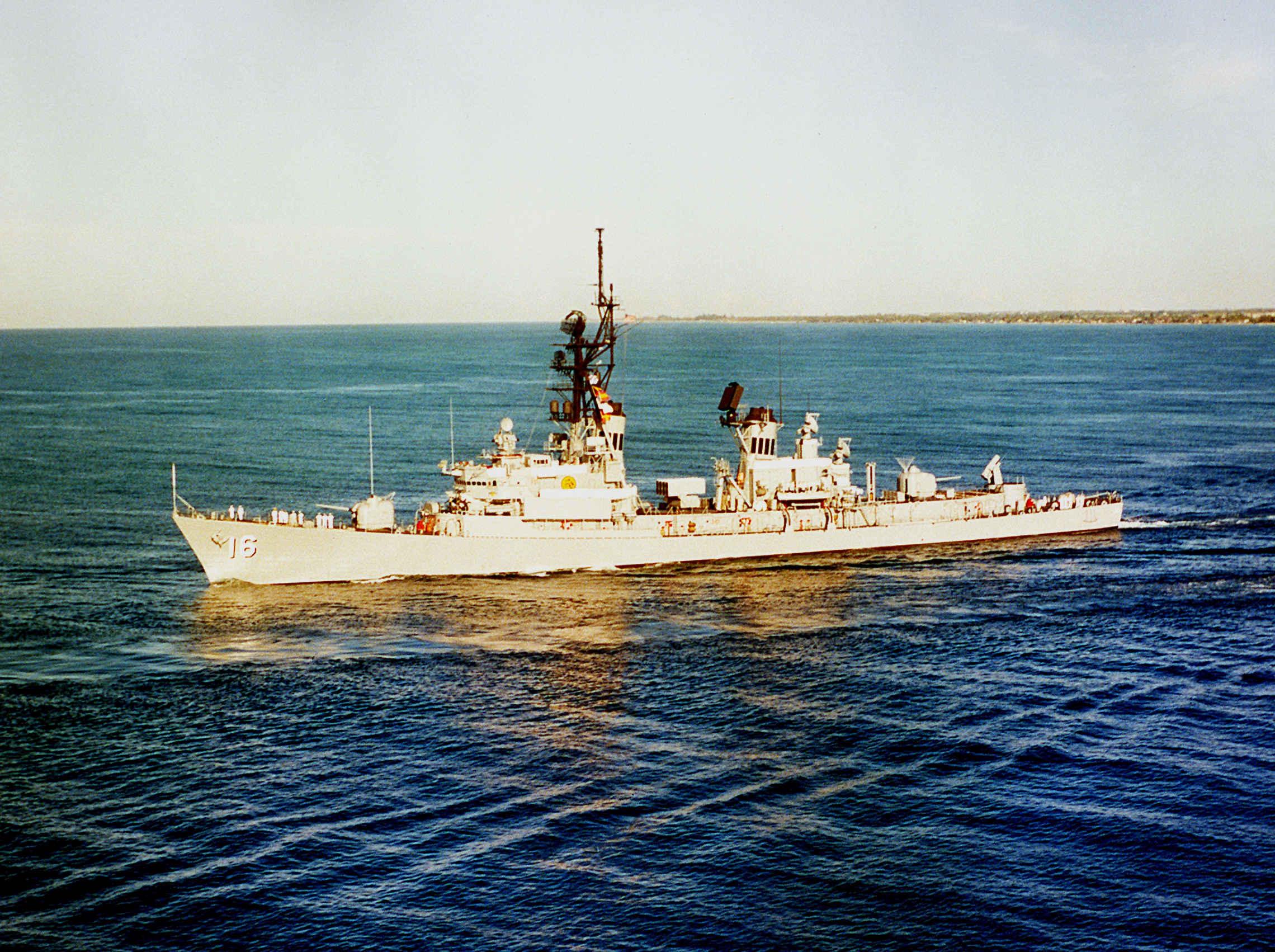
Joseph Strauss in 1986

On 3 September 1965, she successfully fired two improved Tartar missiles off Okinawa. After a 1-day stop at Sasebo, Joseph Strauss proceeded south in the screen of Bon Homme Richard. Upon arrival in the South China Sea, she was detached for picket patrol in the Gulf of Tonkin during the last 3 weeks of September She spent the first 2 weeks of October supporting operations off Vietnam in the screen of Bon Homme Richard and Oriskany. She then returned to Subic Bay for naval gunfire support training, which continued off Da Nang, South Vietnam. On 28 October 1965, she fired her first shots in anger, expending 217 five-inch shells in support of a combined ARVN-Marine Corps search-and-destroy operation against the Viet Cong. Joseph Strauss thus became the first U.S. Navy guided-missile destroyer to fire her guns at enemy targets. As a result of this action, the ship's crew received a commendation from the commanding general, 2nd U.S. Marine Division. Throughout November, she formed an advanced SAR/AAW picket team with Henry W. Tucker in the Gulf of Tonkin. She returned to Yokosuka on 7 December 1965 for upkeep and preparations to resume operations off South Vietnam. Joseph Strauss returned to the Gulf of Tonkin on 10 February 1966 and remained active in the war zone until heading for Hong Kong exactly a month later. Back in the fighting on 26 April, she remained in the war zone until returning to Yokosuka on 15 June. That day, her home port was changed to Pearl Harbor, which she reached on 26 July.

Joseph Strauss operated in the Hawaiian area until heading back for the Western Pacific on 14 January 1967. She remained in the Far East until returning to Pearl Harbor on 17 June.

== 1972 – Gulf of Tonkin Operations ==
On January 27, 1972, Joseph Strauss (DDG-16) departed Pearl Harbor enroute to the Western Pacific. After stopping in Subic Bay, the Philippines, the ship proceeded to the gunline near the demilitarized zone (DMZ) separating South Vietnam and North Vietnam, and was assigned to TU 70.8.9.

The "Vietnam Gunline" describes the U.S. and Allied naval operations off the coast of South Vietnam during the war, where warships provided crucial naval gunfire support (NGFS) to ground troops by bombarding enemy positions, supply lines, and coastal targets.

While on the gunline on February 17, 1972, the ship fired 96 rounds from her forward 5-inch gun, her first NGFS mission during the 1972 cruise. On March 16, she departed the gunline enroute to Taiwan for resupply then returned to the Gulf of Tonkin on March 27 and was assigned to escort the USS Coral Sea (CVA-43). After just two days, the Joseph Strauss was recalled to the gunline on March 30.

=== The Easter Offensive ===
On March 30, 1972, the situation in Vietnam changed dramatically when North Vietnam launching a massive attack on South Vietnam. Known as the Easter Offensive, this 6-month period of intense combat involved the U.S. military, particularly the Navy and Air Force, in both the Republic of Vietnam and North Vietnam.

At the beginning of the North Vietnamese attack, heavy monsoon rains made air combat operations difficult, so NGFS became the only reliable source of assistance to the allied forces. The Joseph Strauss, together with three other Navy destroyers, worked around the clock firing 5-inch projectiles at North Vietnamese targets in the coastal region near the town of Dong Ha. On April 1, while providing NGFS support near the mouth of the Cua Viet River, Joseph Strauss received her first hostile fire, while only 5,000 yards from the shore. During the next few days, the Joseph Strauss fired over 1,500 rounds of 5-inch shells in support of allied troops, a harbinger of the intense combat operations she would experience during the next 4 months.

On April 5, Joseph Strauss was assigned to CTU 77.1.0, Operation Freedom Train, which entailed coordinated aircraft and ship attacks north of the 17th parallel in North Vietnam. The Joseph Strauss was the only ship selected to make an immediate strike on a SAM missile site, the first U.S. naval gunfire into North Vietnam in over 4 years. During the next 10 days, Joseph Strauss and other ships assigned to CTU 77.1.0 conducted multiple gunfire missions targeting military objectives in North Vietnam. The Joseph Strauss remained part of the Freedom Train operation until April 15, when she was detached to proceed to Da Nang, South Vietnam for gun barrel replacement.

After briefly returning to the gunline at the DMZ, the Joseph Strauss was detached and arrived on April 28 in Subic Bay, the Philippines, for necessary maintenance and repairs. She remained in Subic Bay until May 8. After release from the Subic Bay shipyard, the Joseph Strauss returned to the Gulf of Tonkin to serve as a member of Operation Notification Line. This operation involved notifying foreign shipping that North Vietnamese harbors were mined. During this period on May 17, Joseph Strauss conducted a change-of-command ceremony when CDR James Clarkin was relieved by LCDR Shane Daniels.

The Joseph Strauss was next deployed to TU 77.1.2, the former Operation Freedom Train, which was now designated Operation Linebacker. The ship, in company with other U.S. naval vessels, conducted multiple nightly gunfire strikes along the coast of North Vietnam, routinely encountering hostile fire during these strikes.

=== Underwater Explosions ===
On June 4, as Joseph Strauss approached the North Vietnam coast, she encountered two large underwater explosions. Water and mud were hurled more than 50 feet into the air and covered the upper decks of the ship. All boilers on the ship were knocked offline, and the ship went dead in the water. While she experienced minimal personnel casualties, Joseph Strauss suffered significant material casualties caused by shock damage. An investigation determined that theJoseph Strauss detonated U.S. underwater mines that were intended for North Vietnamese harbors. Despite the material casualties, Joseph Strauss remained on the gunline through June 19, operating with multiple U.S. Navy vessels and providing NGFS along the coast of the Republic of Vietnam from the demilitarized zone to the city of Hue.

On June 20, Joseph Strauss detached and proceeded to Sasebo, Japan, for general maintenance and repairs from the June 4 underwater explosions. On June 30, she departed Sasebo to return to the Gulf of Tonkin and join TU 70.8.9. This task unit of 15 destroyers and cruisers provided support to recapture Quang Tri City.

On July 18, the Joseph Strauss sailed south to Qui Nhan to form the new Task Unit 70.8.2 supporting Republic of Vietnam operations through July 30. On August 1, during her final combat mission in 1972, Joseph Strauss fired over 500 rounds of 5-inch ammunition in support of a helicopter assault. She then was detached and proceeded to Hong Kong for her only rest and relaxation port of call. On August 10, Joseph Strauss arrived in Subic Bay and then three days later, commenced her transit back to Pearl Harbor, arriving August 25, 1972.

For her meritorious service, the USS Joseph Strauss (DDG-16) was awarded the Navy Unit Commendation by the secretary of the Navy, for combat actions from February through August 1972. In particular, the commendation highlighted the ship’s operations during the initial phases of Operation Freedom Train. Ultimately, the Joseph Strauss would fire over 15,000 rounds of 5-inch ammunition between February and August.

When Joseph Strauss returned to Pearl Harbor in late August, she had the knowledge that no crew member was lost or significantly injured during her 7-month deployment.

== Operation Praying Mantis ==
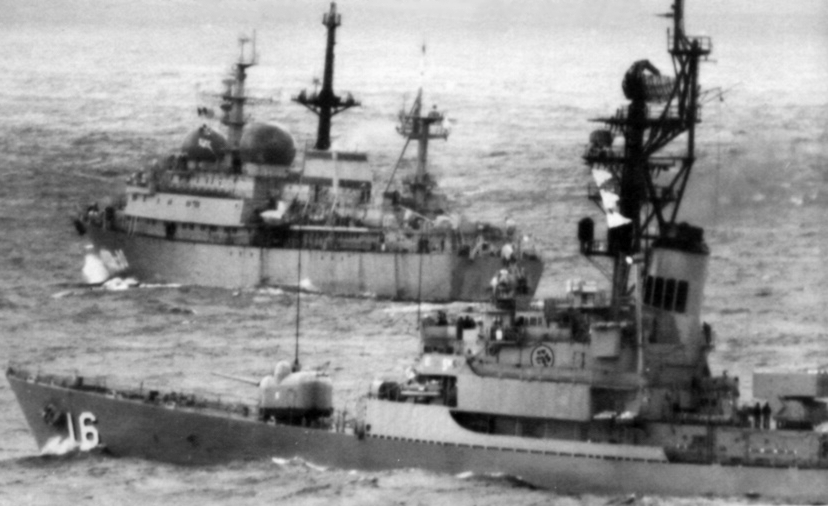
Joseph Strauss put herself between a Soviet AGI and the carrier Enterprise in 1988.

On 14 April 1988, the frigate Samuel B. Roberts sighted three mines floating about 1/2 mile from the ship. About 20 minutes after the first sighting, as Samuel B. Roberts was backing clear of the minefield, she struck a submerged mine, nearly ripping the warship in half. The crew stabilized the ship. Samuel B. Roberts was sent back to the U.S. for repair.

On 18 April 1988, Operation Praying Mantis, an attack by U.S. naval forces, took place in retaliation for the Iranian mining of the Persian Gulf and damage to the American ship Samuel B. Roberts. The battle, the largest for American surface forces since World War II, sank two Iranian warships and marked the first surface-to-surface missile engagement in U.S. Navy history. The Americans attacked with several groups of surface warships, plus aircraft.

In the middle of the action, Joshan, an Iranian Kaman-class fast-attack craft, challenged the cruiser USS Wainwright and Surface Action Group (SAG) Charlie, firing a Harpoon missile at them. The frigate USS Simpson responded to the challenge by firing four Standard missiles, while Wainwright followed with two Standard missiles. The attacks destroyed the Iranian ship's superstructure, but did not immediately sink her. The three ships of SAG Charlie (Wainwright, Simpson, and Bagley) closed on Joshan, destroying the Iranian vessel with naval gunfire. Fighting continued when the Iranian frigate Sahand departed Bandar Abbas and challenged elements of an American SAG. The frigate was spotted by two VA-95 A-6Es, while they were flying surface combat air patrol for Joseph Strauss. Sahand fired missiles at the A-6Es, and the Intruders replied with two Harpoons and four laser-guided Skipper bombs. Joseph Strauss added a Harpoon missile. Most, if not all, of the U.S. weapons hit the Iranian ship. Fires blazing on Sahand's decks eventually reached her magazines, causing an explosion that helped sink the ship. Despite the loss of Sahand, one of Iran's most modern ships, the Iranian navy continued to fight. Late in the day, a sister ship of Sahand, Sabalan, departed from her berth and fired a surface-to-air missile at several A-6Es from VA-95. Intruder pilot Engler dropped a laser-guided bomb on Sabalan, leaving the ship dead in the water. The Iranian frigate, stern partially submerged, was taken in tow by an Iranian tugboat.

== Greek service and decommissioning ==
Joseph Strauss was decommissioned on 1 February 1990, transferred to Greece on 1 October 1992, and renamed Formion (D220), for the Athenian Admiral Phormio, and stricken from the Naval Vessel Register on 11 January 1995.

Greece decommissioned Formion on 29 July 2002, and the ship was sold as scrap on 19 February 2004.
