= Anthony A. Less =

United States Navy admiral (1937–2026)

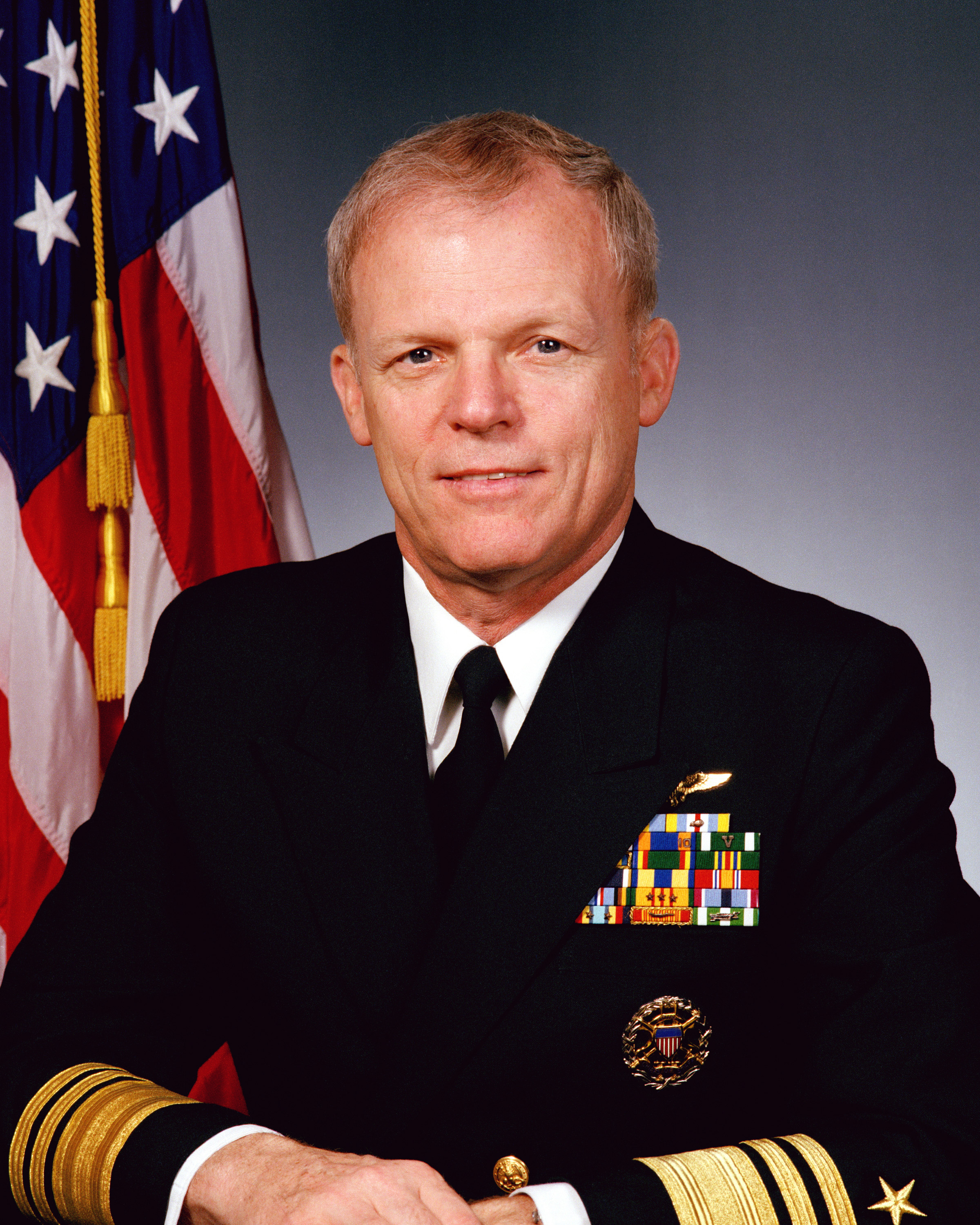
- Born: August 31, 1937; Salem, Ohio, U.S.
- Died: October 13, 2026 (aged 89); Clifton, Virginia, U.S.
- Military career
- Allegiance: United States
- Branch: United States Navy
- Service years: 1960–1994
- Rank: Vice Admiral
- Commands: Commander Tony Less was the Blue Angels first commanding officer after the flight team was redesignated as a squadron.
- Conflicts: Vietnam War; Operation Earnest Will; *Operation Praying Mantis

Anthony Albert Less (August 31, 1937 – October 13, 2026) was an American vice admiral in the United States Navy. He was Commander Naval Air Force, U.S. Atlantic Fleet from 1991 to 1994. He was an alumnus of Leetonia High School in Leetonia, Ohio, and Heidelberg University in Tiffin, Ohio.

After flight training, Less was designated a naval aviator in June 1961. He then served with VA-43, VA-86 and VA-44 flying the A-4 Skyhawk. VA-86 was deployed on the carrier Independence based at Norfolk, Virginia. Transitioning to the A-7 Corsair, he served with VA-174, VA-105 and then VA-174 again. VA-105 was deployed on the carrier Kitty Hawk for combat operations in Southeast Asia during the Vietnam War.

In April 1971, Less joined VA-12 and became executive officer. He then served as commanding officer of the squadron from June 1972 to October 1973. Less served as commanding officer of the Naval Flight Demonstration Squadron from November 1973 to January 1976. He then joined Carrier Air Wing Nine, serving as commander from August 1976 to December 1977.

Less served as the commanding officer of the replenishment oiler Wichita from December 1979 to July 1981 and the carrier Ranger from June 1982 to July 1983.

Promoted to rear admiral, he was given command of Carrier Group One from August 1987 to December 1987 and Joint Task Force Middle East from January 1988 to April 1989. It was at this time that he launched Operation Praying Mantis (in May 1998) as a response in Operation Earnest Will to the damage sustained by USS Samuel B. Roberts, which had run upon a mine laid by the Iranian navy. He was characterized as "more aggressive" than his predecessor at the Middle East Force, RAdm Harold Bernsen. Less "went so far as to identify the [target], the [Iranian] frigate Sabalan, as its captain had ordered the cold-blooded machine-gunning of survivors of sunken tankers." As the result of the operation, "Iranian losses were three oil platforms heavily damaged, six surface vessels sunk, one heavily damaged, and an unknown number of casualties. American losses were one AH-1T attack helicopter and its two-man crew. Iranian attacks on merchant shipping dramatically fell after that." Operation Earnest Will, which had been launched in the wake of Resolution 598, was successfully completed on 28 September 1988 after the Iranian government had earlier decided to sue for peace in the Iran–Iraq War.

He was the Commander when on July 3, 1988, USS Vincennes, mistook Iran Air Flight 655 for an Iranian F-14 and shot it down over the Strait of Hormuz. All 290 passengers and aircrew aboard the Airbus A300B2 died, including 65 children or infants.

His awards included the Defense Distinguished Service Medal, Navy Distinguished Service Medal (with gold star in lieu of second award), Defense Superior Service Medal (with oak leaf cluster in lieu of second award), Legion of Merit (with gold star in lieu of second award), Air Medal with 10 strike/flight awards, Navy Commendation Medal with Combat "V", joint Meritorious Unit Award, Navy Unit Commendation and Navy "E" Ribbon. In retirement he served a stint as President of the Association of Naval Aviation.

Less died on October 13, 2026, at the age of 89.
