= Operation Praying Mantis =

1988 US attack on Iran in the Iran-Iraq War

- Part of the tanker war of the Iran–Iraq War
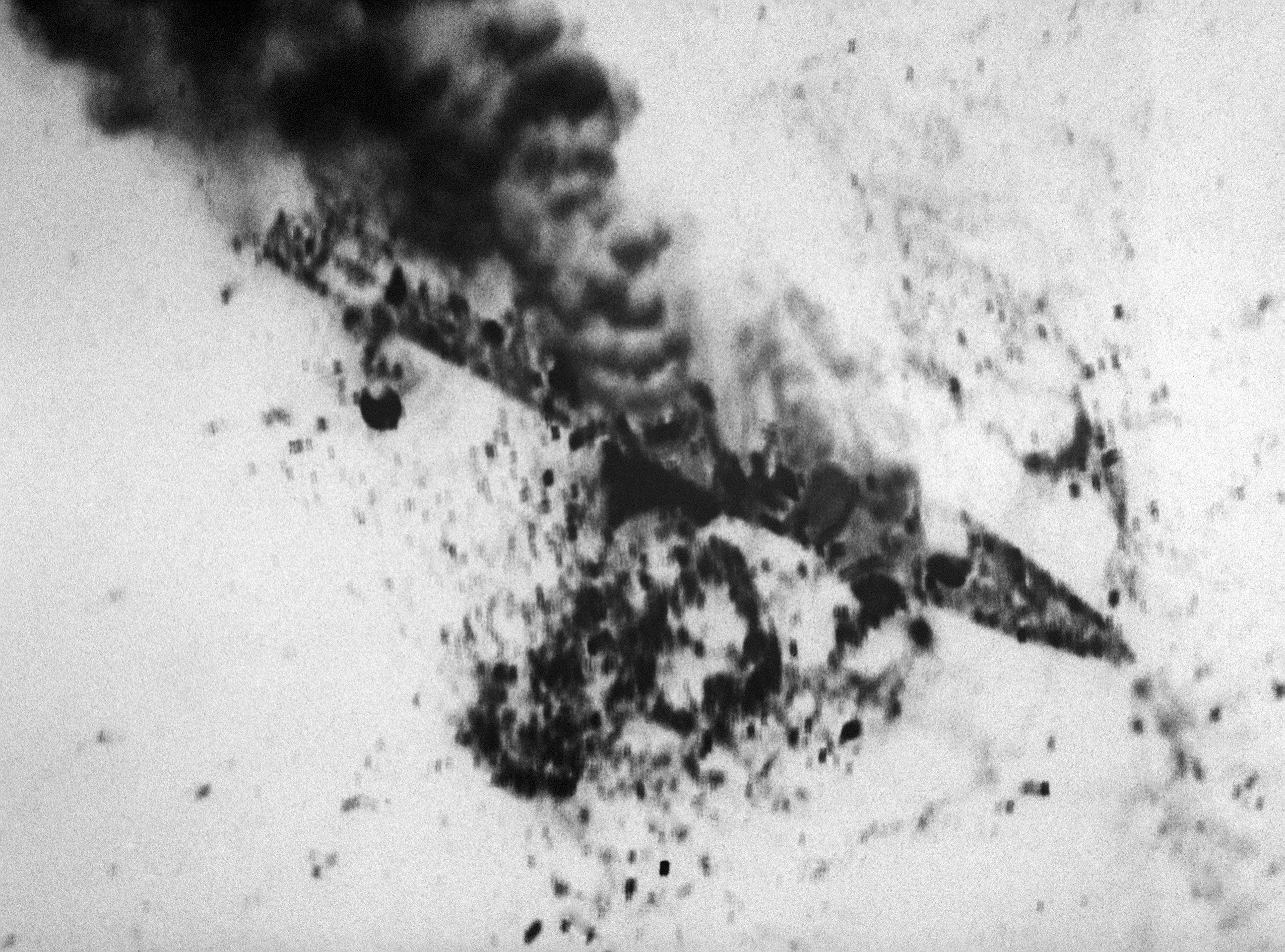
- The Iranian frigate Sahand attacked by aircraft of U.S. Navy Carrier Air Wing 11
Date	18 April 1988
Location	Persian Gulf, Iranian territorial waters
Result	United States victory

Belligerents
United States	Iran

Commanders and leaders
(United States) Rear Adm. Anthony A. Less	(Iran) IRIN Commodore Mohammad-Hossein Malekzadegan

Strength
1 aircraft carrier 1 amphibious transport dock 4 destroyers 1 guided missile cruiser 3 frigates AH-1T attack helicopters A-6E Intruder attack jets	2 frigates 1 missile boat 6 Boghammar speedboats (estimated); 2 F-4 fighters ZU-23 guns on 2 platforms

Casualties and losses
2 killed 1 helicopter crashed (cause unknown): Civilian assets: 1 tanker damaged 1 supply ship damaged 1 barge damaged	1 frigate sunk (45 crew killed); 1 gunboat sunk (11 crew killed); 3 speedboats sunk 1 frigate crippled 2 platforms destroyed 1 fighter damaged Total: 56 killed 2 ships and 3 boats sunk

Operation Praying Mantis was the 18 April 1988 attack by the United States on Iranian naval targets in the Persian Gulf in retaliation for the mining of a U.S. warship four days earlier. It took place during the US presidency of Ronald Reagan and the rule of Supreme Leader of Iran Ruhollah Khomeini.

On 14 April, the American guided missile frigate USS Samuel B. Roberts struck a mine while transiting international waters as part of Operation Earnest Will, the 1987–88 effort to protect reflagged Kuwaiti oil tankers from Iranian attacks during the Iran–Iraq War. The explosion pierced the hull and broke the keel of the Samuel B. Roberts, which nearly sank but was saved by its crew with no loss of life.

After the serial numbers of mines recovered in the area were found to match those of mines seized on an Iranian barge the previous September, U.S. military officials planned a retaliatory operation. On 18 April, the attack destroyed, damaged, or sank two Iranian oil platforms, two frigates, a fast-attack craft, several armed boats, and two fighter jets. Two U.S. Marine aviators died when their helicopter crashed into the Persian Gulf. The attack pressured Iran to agree to a ceasefire with Iraq later that summer, ending the eight-year Iran–Iraq War.

Iran later sued the United States, claiming that the attacks had breached the countries' 1955 Treaty of Amity. On 6 November 2003, the International Court of Justice dismissed the claim but ruled that Operation Praying Mantis and the previous October's Operation Nimble Archer "cannot be justified as measures necessary to protect the essential security interests of the United States of America."

Praying Mantis was the largest of the U.S. Navy's five major surface engagements since World War II. (Note: The others are the Korean War's Battle of Chumonchin Chan, the Vietnam War's Gulf of Tonkin incident and Battle of Đồng Hới, and the 1986 Action in the Gulf of Sidra.) It saw the U.S. Navy's first exchange of anti-ship missiles with opposing ships, and by then its only sinking of a major surface combatant, since World War II.

== Battle ==
On 18 April, the U.S. Navy attacked with several groups of surface warships, plus aircraft from the aircraft carrier USS Enterprise, and her cruiser escort, USS Truxtun. The action began with coordinated strikes by two surface groups.

One surface action group, or SAG, consisting of the destroyers USS Merrill (including embarked LAMPS Mk I helicopter detachment HSL-35 Det 1 Helicopter Anti-Submarine Squadron Light 35) and USS Lynde McCormick, plus the amphibious transport dock USS Trenton and its embarked Marine air-ground task force (Contingency MAGTF 2-88 from Camp LeJeune, North Carolina) and the LAMPS helicopter detachment (HSL-44 Det 5) from USS Samuel B. Roberts, was ordered to destroy the guns and other military facilities on the Sassan oil platform.

At 8 am, the SAG commander, who was also the commander of Destroyer Squadron 9, ordered the Merrill to radio a warning to the occupants of the platform, telling them to abandon it. The SAG waited 20 minutes, then opened fire. The oil platform fired back with twin-barrelled 23 mm ZU-23 guns. The SAG's guns eventually disabled some of the ZU-23s, and platform occupants radioed a request for a cease-fire. The SAG complied.

After a tugboat carrying more personnel had cleared the area, the ships resumed exchanging fire with the remaining ZU-23s, and ultimately disabled them. AH-1 Cobra helicopters completed the destruction of enemy resistance. The Marines boarded the platform and recovered a single wounded survivor, who was transported to Bahrain, some small arms, and intelligence. The Marines planted explosives, left the platform, and detonated them. The SAG was then ordered to proceed north to the Rakhsh oil platform to destroy it.

As the SAG departed the Sassan oil field, two Iranian F-4s made an attack run but broke off when Lynde McCormick locked its fire-control radar on the aircraft. Halfway to the Rahksh oil platform, the attack was called off in an attempt to ease pressure on the Iranians and signal a desire for de-escalation.

The other group, which included the guided missile cruiser USS Wainwright and frigates USS Simpson and USS Bagley, attacked the Sirri oil platform. Navy SEALs were assigned to capture, occupy, and destroy the Sirri platform but because it had already been heavily damaged by naval gunfire, an assault was not required.

Iran responded by dispatching Boghammar speedboats to attack various targets in the Persian Gulf, including the American-flagged supply ship Willie Tide, the Panamanian-flagged oil rig Scan Bay and the British tanker York Marine. All of these vessels were damaged in different degrees. The targets were part of the Mubarak off-shore Saudi oil field. After the attacks, A-6E Intruder aircraft launched from USS Enterprise were directed to the speedboats by an American frigate. The two VA-95 aircraft dropped Rockeye cluster bombs on the speedboats, sinking one and damaging several others, which then fled to the Iranian-controlled island of Abu Musa.

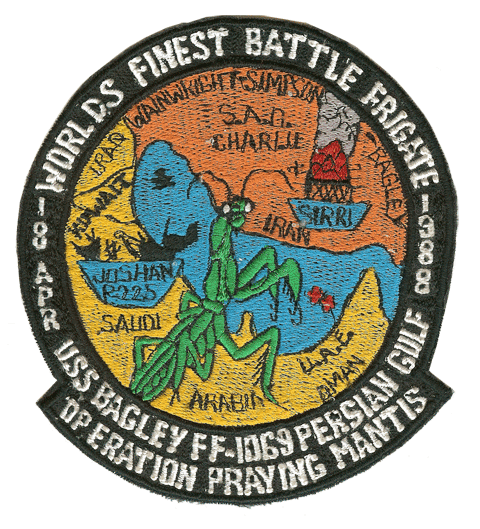
A combat patch for Operation Praying Mantis

Action continued to escalate. Iranian fast-attack craft Joshan, an Iranian Kaman-class (La Combattante II type) fast attack craft, challenged Wainwright and Surface Action Group Charlie. The commanding officer of Wainwright directed a final warning (of a series of warnings) stating that Joshan was to "stop your engines, abandon ship, I intend to sink you". Joshan responded by firing a Harpoon missile at them. The missile was successfully lured away by chaff.

Simpson responded to the challenge by firing four Standard missiles, while Wainwright followed with one Standard missile. All missiles hit and destroyed the Iranian ship's superstructure but did not immediately sink it, so Bagley fired another Harpoon. The missile did not find the target. SAG Charlie closed on Joshan, with Simpson, then Bagley and Wainwright firing guns to sink the crippled Iranian ship.

Two Iranian F-4 Phantom fighters were orbiting about 48 km (26 nmi) away when Wainwright decided to drive them away. Wainwright fired two Extended Range Standard missiles, one of which detonated near an F-4, blowing off part of its wing and peppering the fuselage with shrapnel. The F-4s withdrew, and the Iranian pilot landed his damaged airplane at Bandar Abbas.

Fighting continued when the Iranian frigate IRIS Sahand departed Bandar Abbas and challenged elements of an American surface group. The frigate was spotted by two A-6Es from VA-95 while they were flying surface combat air patrol for USS Joseph Strauss.

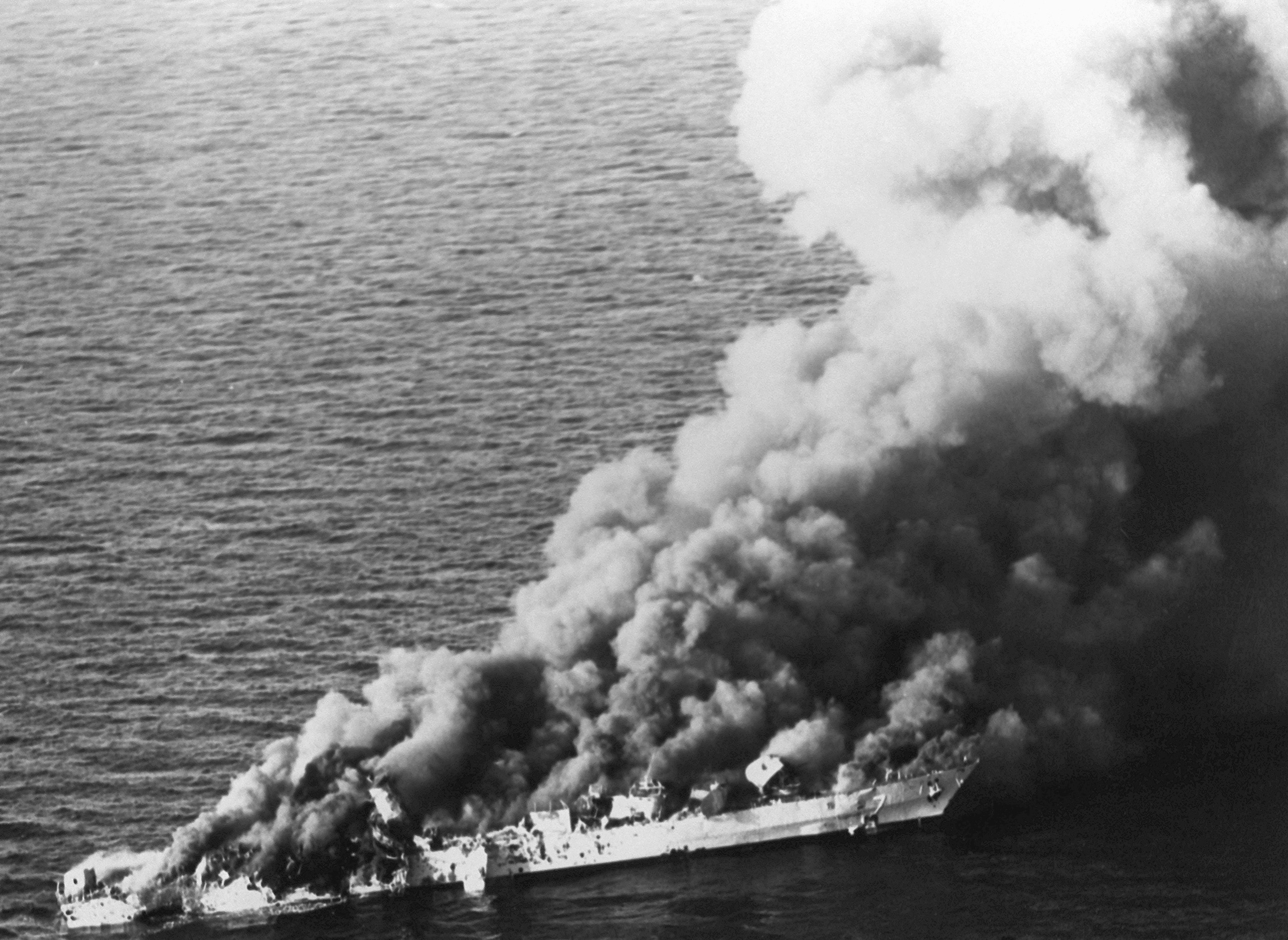
The Iranian frigate Sahand burning from bow to stern on 18 April 1988 after being attacked

Sahand fired missiles at the A-6Es, which replied with two Harpoon missiles and four laser-guided Skipper missiles. Joseph Strauss fired a Harpoon missile. Most or all of the shots scored hits, causing heavy damage and fires. Fires blazing on Sahand's decks eventually reached its munitions magazines, causing an explosion that sank it.

Late in the day, the Iranian frigate IRIS Sabalan departed from its berth and fired a surface-to-air missile at several A-6Es from VA-95. The A-6Es then dropped a Mark 82 laser-guided bomb into Sabalan's stack, crippling the ship and leaving it burning. The Iranian frigate, stern partially submerged, was taken in tow by an Iranian tug, and was repaired and eventually returned to service. VA-95's aircraft, as ordered, did not continue the attack. The A-6 pilot who crippled Sabalan, Lieutenant Commander James Engler, was awarded the Distinguished Flying Cross by Admiral William J. Crowe, Chairman of the Joint Chiefs of Staff, for the actions against Sabalan and the Iranian gunboats.

In retaliation for the attacks, Iran fired Silkworm missiles, suspected to be the HY-4 version, from land bases against SAG Delta in the Strait of Hormuz and against USS Gary in the northern central Persian Gulf, but all missed because of evasive maneuvers and use of decoys by the ships. A missile was probably shot down by Gary's 76 mm (3.0 in) gun. The Pentagon and the Reagan Administration later denied that any Silkworm missile attacks took place, possibly in order to keep the situation from escalating further - as they had promised publicly that any such attacks would merit retaliation against targets on Iranian soil.

=== Disengagement ===
After the attack on Sabalan, U.S. naval forces were ordered to assume a de-escalatory posture, giving Iran a way out and avoiding further combat. Iran took the offer and combat ceased, though both sides remained on alert, and near-clashes occurred throughout the night and into the next day as the forces steamed within the Gulf. Two days after the battle, Lynde McCormick was directed to escort a U.S. oiler out through the Strait of Hormuz, while a Scandinavian-flagged merchant remained near, probably for protection. While the ships remained alert, no hostile indications were received, and the clash was over.

== Aftermath ==
By the end of the operation, US Marines and US Navy ships and aircraft had destroyed Iranian naval and intelligence facilities on two inoperable oil platforms in the Persian Gulf, and sunk at least three armed Iranian Boghammer speedboats, one Iranian frigate, and one fast attack missile boat. One other Iranian frigate was damaged in the battle. Sabalan was repaired in 1989 and returned to service, until she was sunk during the 2026 Iran war. The fires eventually burned themselves out but the damage to the infrastructure forced the demolition of the Sirri platforms after the war. The site was built up again for oil production by French and Russian oil companies, after buying the drilling rights from the Iranian government.

The U.S. side suffered two casualties, the crew of a Marine Corps AH-1T Sea Cobra attack helicopter. The Cobra, attached to USS Trenton, was flying reconnaissance from Wainwright and crashed sometime after dark about 15 miles (24 km) southwest of Abu Musa island. The bodies of the lost personnel were recovered by Navy divers in May, and the wreckage of the helicopter was raised later that month. Navy officials said it showed no sign of battle damage.

Following the attack, Legal Advisor to the State Department Abraham Sofaer messaged his counterpart in Iran’s Foreign Ministry, Dr. Efthekar Jaromi, suggesting that they cancel their meeting scheduled in The Hague to address Iranian/U.S. claims. Dr. Jaromi responded that they meet as scheduled rather than “burn the only bridge between our countries.”

A month later, the guided-missile cruiser USS Vincennes arrived, summoned in haste to protect the frigate Samuel B. Roberts as it was hauled back to the United States. On 3 July 1988, Vincennes shot down Iran Air Flight 655, a commercial airliner flying a scheduled route, killing all 290 crew and passengers. The U.S. government claimed that the crew of Vincennes mistook the Iranian Airbus for an attacking F-14 fighter. The Iranian government alleged that Vincennes knowingly shot down a civilian aircraft and called for the deaths of its crew.

=== International Court of Justice ===
On 6 November 2003 the International Court of Justice dismissed a claim by Iran and a counterclaim by the United States' for reparations for breach of a 1955 'Treaty of Amity' between the two countries. In short, the court rejected both claim and counterclaim because the 1955 treaty protected only "freedom of trade and navigation between the territories of the parties" and because of the US trade embargo on Iran at the time, no direct trade or navigation between the two was affected by the conflict.

The court did state that "the actions of the United States of America against Iranian oil platforms on 19 October 1987 (Operation Nimble Archer) and 18 April 1988 (Operation Praying Mantis) cannot be justified as measures necessary to protect the essential security interests of the United States of America". The Court ruled that it "...cannot however uphold the submission of the Islamic Republic of Iran that those actions constitute a breach of the obligations of the United States of America under Article X, paragraph 1, of that Treaty, regarding freedom of commerce between the territories of the parties, and that, accordingly, the claim of the Islamic Republic of Iran for reparation also cannot be upheld;".

== U.S. naval order of battle ==
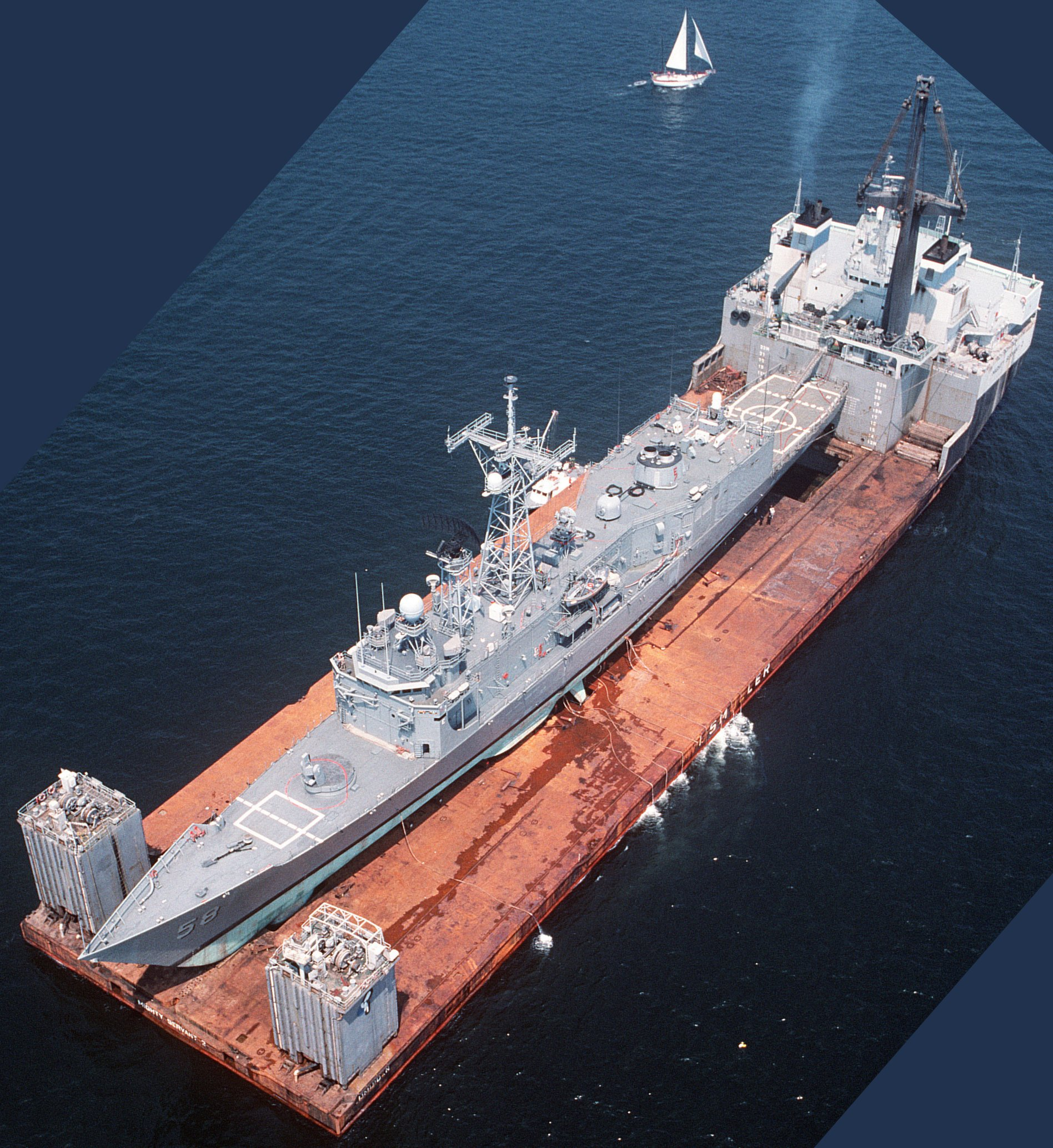
Samuel B. Roberts is carried away aboard Mighty Servant 2 after hitting a mine in the Persian Gulf.

- Officer in Tactical Command: Commander Joint Task Force Middle East (aboard USS Coronado)
- Battle Group Commander: Commander, Cruiser/Destroyer Group Three (aboard USS Enterprise)

Surface Action Group Bravo

- On Scene Commander: Commander, Destroyer Squadron Nine (Embarked on Merrill)
- USS Merrill – destroyer
- USS Lynde McCormick – guided missile destroyer
- USS Trenton – amphibious transport dock
- Marine Air-Ground Task Force (MAGTF) 2–88 (4 AH-1T, 2 UH-1, 2 CH-46)
- Helicopter AntiSubmarine Squadron 44 Detachment 5 – LAMPS Helicopter (SH-60B)

Surface Action Group Charlie

- OSC: CO, USS Wainwright
- USS Wainwright – guided missile cruiser
- USS Bagley – frigate
- USS Simpson – guided missile frigate
- SEAL platoon

Surface Action Group Delta

- OSC: Commander Destroyer Squadron Twenty Two (Embarked on Jack Williams)
- USS Jack Williams – guided missile frigate
- USS O'Brien – destroyer
- USS Joseph Strauss – guided missile destroyer

Mobile Sea Bases (MSB) Hercules and Wimbrown VII

USS GARY- Guided Missile frigate

Air support

- Elements of Carrier Air Wing Eleven operating from aircraft carrier USS Enterprise
- A-6E & KA-6D Intruders of VA-95 operating from aircraft carrier USS Enterprise

Ship maintenance and support

- USS Samuel Gompers – destroyer tender – performed ship maintenance and repairs operating off the coast of Oman
- USS Wabash – fast attack oiler – provided underway replenishment of fuel, ammunition, and supplies to the USS Enterprise Battle Group
- USS San Jose – fast attack support – conducted SAR support including firefighting equipment and medical evacuation of USS Samuel B. Roberts FFG 58 personnel after the mine strike, and provided underway replenishment of fuel and supplies to the USS Enterprise Battle Group

== See also ==
- 2026 Iran War
- Bridgeton incident
- Iran Air Flight 655
- Operation Prime Chance
