= Sea Killer / Marte =

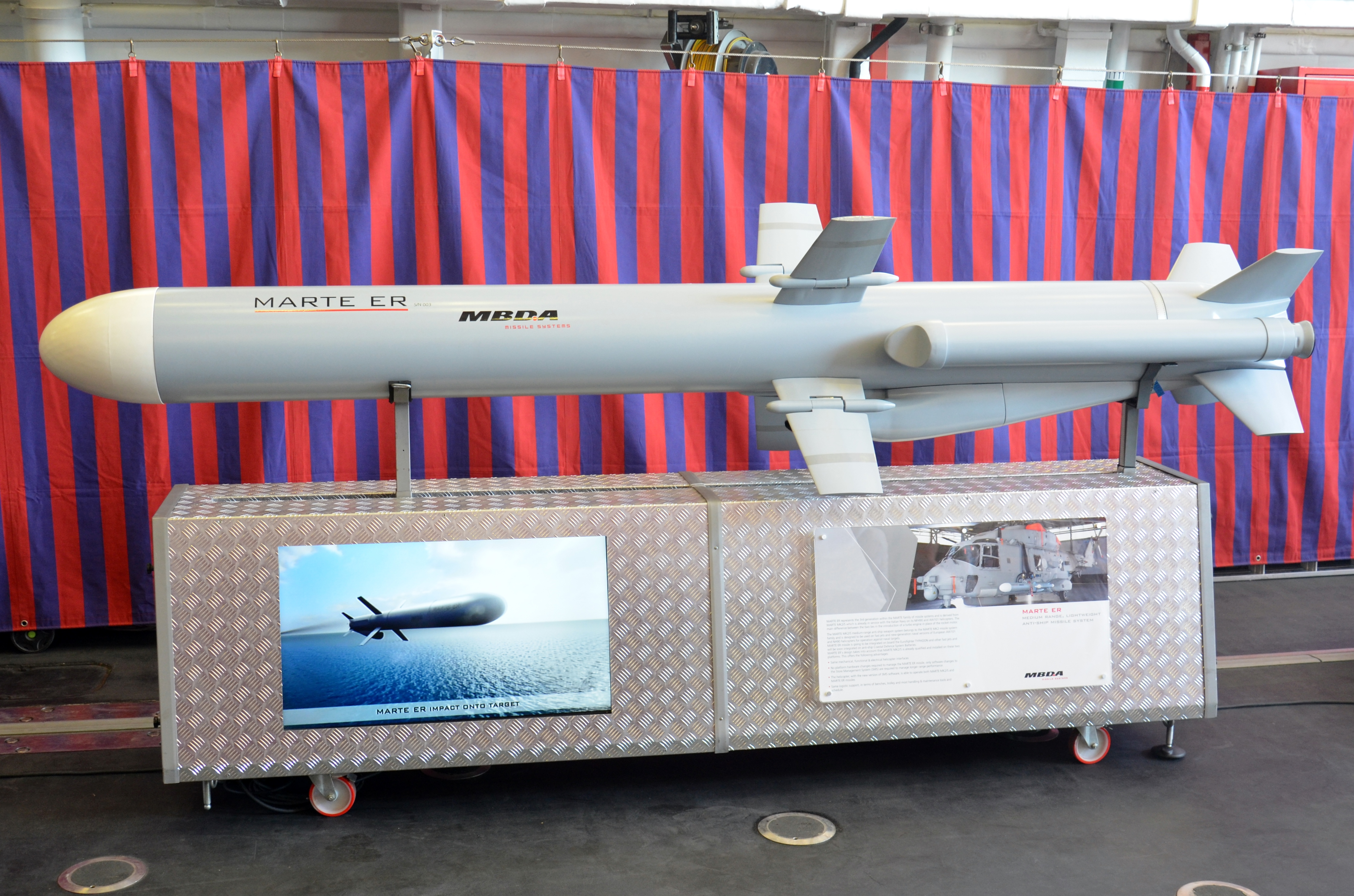
- A Marte ER on display aboard an Italian FREMM multipurpose frigate
- Type: Anti-ship missile
- Place of origin: Italy

Service history
- Used by: Italy; Iran; United Arab Emirates; Qatar; Turkmenistan; Venezuela
- Wars: Iran-Iraq War

Production history
- Manufacturer: MBDA Italia / (historic: Sistel SpA)

Specifications
- Mass: 300 kg (660 lb): Marte ER: 340 kg (750 lb); Marte MK2/S, Marte MK2/N: 310 kg (680 lb)
- Length: 4.7 m (15 ft 5 in): Marte ER: 3.6 m (11 ft 10 in); Marte MK2/S, Marte MK2/N: 3.85 m (12 ft 8 in)
- Diameter: 0.206 m (8.1 in) (body): Marte ER, Marte MK2/S, Marte MK2/N: 0.316 m (12.4 in) (max body diameter)
- Wingspan: 0.999 m (3 ft 3.3 in)
- Warhead: 70 kg (150 lb) Semi-armour piercing HE
- Detonation mechanism: Impact and proximity fuze
- Engine: Solid fuel rocket booster and sustainer: Marte-ER: turbojet Williams WJ-24-8G WR
- Operational range: Sea Killer Mark 1: 10 km (6.2 mi); Sea Killer Mark 2: over 25 km (16 mi); Marte MK2/S, Marte MK2/N: 30 km (19 mi); Marte ER: over 100 km (62 mi)
- Flight altitude: Sea skimming
- Maximum speed: Mach 0,8-0,9
- Guidance system: Sea Killer, Marte 1: Beam riding; Marte 2, Marte ER: Active radar homing
- Launch platform: Naval ships, aircraft, helicopters, coastal installations

Sea Killer is an Italian anti-ship missile family. The latest development of the system is known as Marte. Marte is a sea skimming, subsonic, anti-ship missile carrying a 70 kilograms (150 lb) semi-armour piercing warhead. It has been built in several versions, with differing guidance systems, and is suitable for launching from ships or aircraft.

Sea Killer was initially developed during the 1960s and has been deployed by at least six countries. It was used during the Iran–Iraq War, with at least six ships being hit.

== Development and design ==
Contraves Italiana, an Italian subsidiary of the Swiss armaments company Oerlikon Contraves, began development of a short-ranged - 10 kilometres (6.2 mi) - ship-based anti-ship missile system, named Nettuno in 1963. Guidance of Nettuno was by beam riding for course control, with altitude controlled automatically by an onboard radar altimeter, allowing the missile to carry out sea-skimming attacks. Command guidance was an alternative guidance method if jamming made the beam-riding method unusable. In 1965, Contraves Italiana began work on an improved missile, Vulcano, which used the same guidance system, but included a two-stage (booster + sustainer) rocket motor to give a longer (25 kilometres (16 mi)) range. Both missiles could be fired from a five-round trainable launcher.

Testing of Nettuno began in 1966, with a trial installation being made on the Freccia-class patrol boat Saetta of the Italian navy, with the five-round launcher replacing a Bofors 40 mm gun. Testing of Vulcano began in 1969.

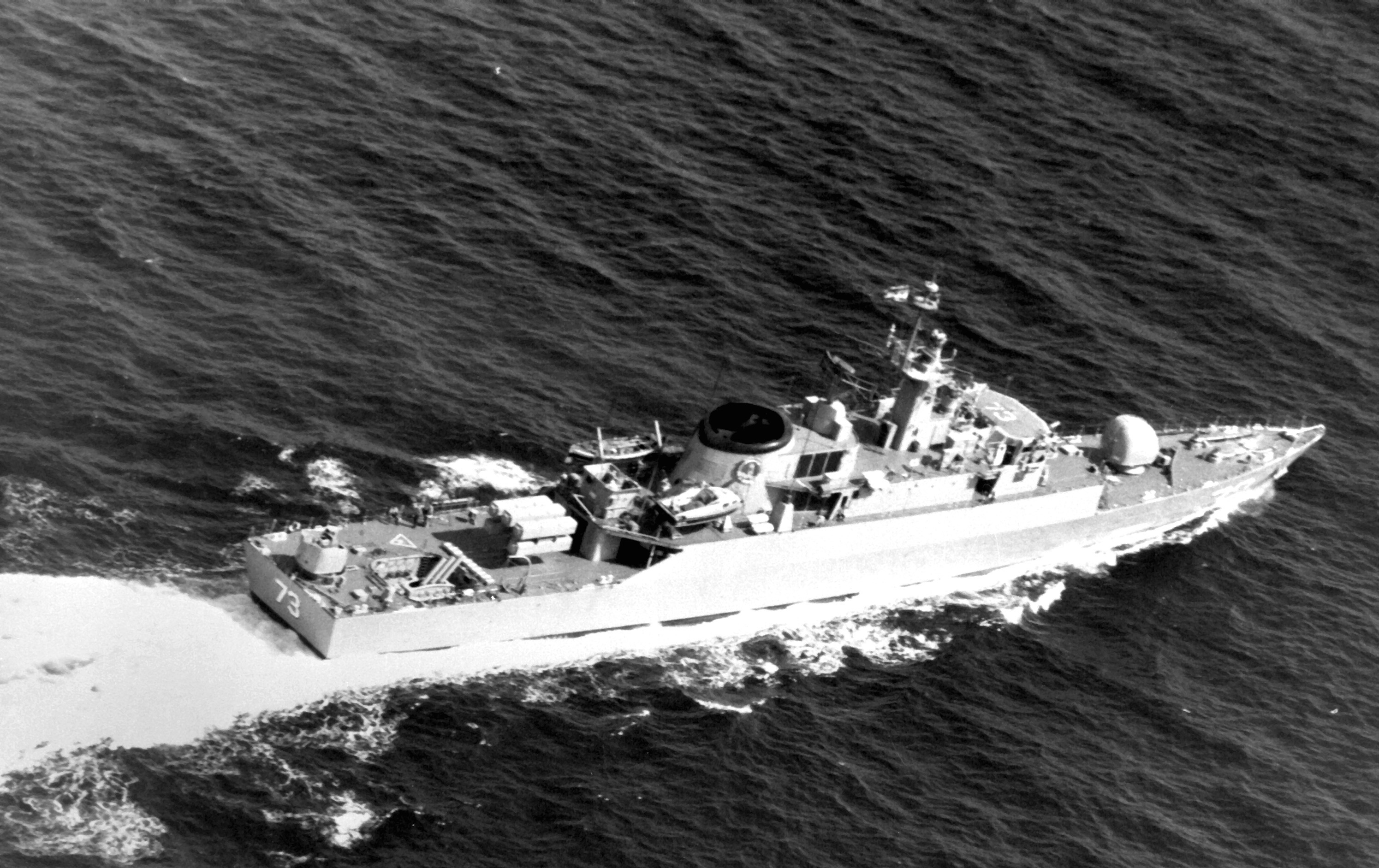
The Iranian frigate Sabalan showing the five round launcher for Sea Killer missiles

In 1967, the Italian company Sistel (Sistemi Elettronici) was set up as a joint venture by five Italian companies, including Contraves Italiana, and the missile division of Contraves Italiana was transferred to Sistel, along with the Nettuno and Vulcano missiles in 1969. Nettuno and Vulcano were renamed Sea Killer Mark 1 and 2 respectively for export, and these names gradually replaced the older names.

Sea Killer Mark 2 was purchased by Iran to arm its Saam class of four frigates, each of which was fitted with a single five-round launcher. No other sales of the ship-based version were made, but development of Sea Killer Mark 2 into an all-weather anti-ship missile to equip the Italian Navy's helicopters began in 1967, with the helicopter-based weapon system being named Marte.

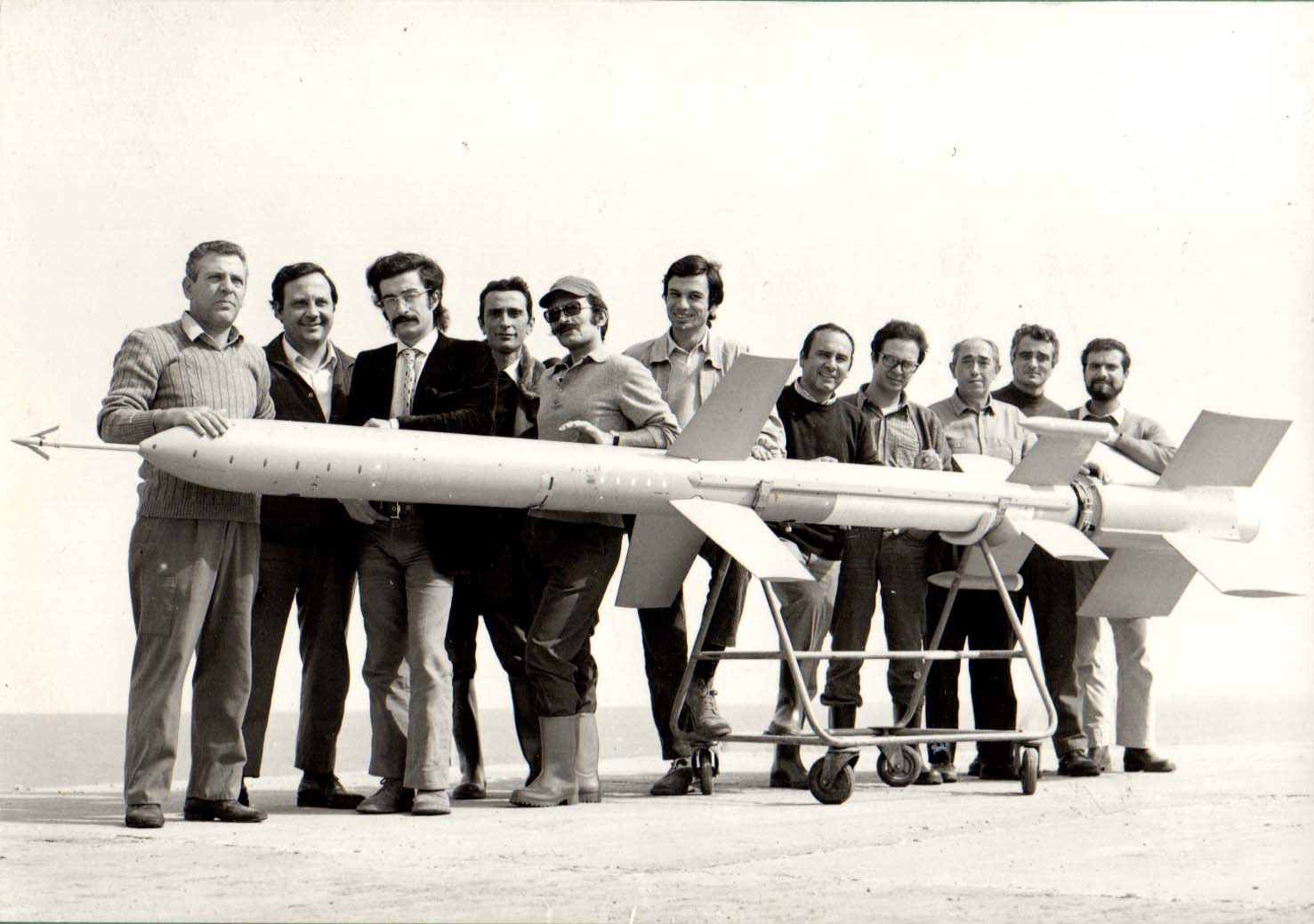
Prototype in 1971

Marte entered service with the Italian Navy in 1977, with its Sikorsky SH-3 Sea Kings being fitted with two Sea Killer Mark 2 missiles. In 1983, a new version, Marte 2, was announced, with the beam-riding guidance replaced by an active radar homing seeker based on that used by the Otomat anti-ship missile. Testing of Marte 2 started in 1984, and the missile entered service with the Italian Navy in 1987.

The Marte ER, an improvement on the missile family, replaced the rocket motor with Williams WJ-24-8G turbojet propulsion and added a new ISO-caliber cylinder cell, which made it shorter in length but extended its range to over 100 km (62 mi; 54 nmi). Fitting trials of the Marte-ER onto the NH90 helicopter, which can carry two missiles, occurred in June 2014; a larger anti-ship missile like the Exocet was rejected for integration as physically too long and heavy.

In November 2015, a Eurofighter Typhoon was fit-tested for a fixed-wing version of the missile called the Marte-ERP, which does not feature folding fins and sheds the booster for a larger 120 kg (265 lb) warhead with penetrating and sector-blast properties; though smaller than other options like the Harpoon and RBS-15, a fighter like Eurofighter Typhoon can carry six Marte-ERPs (or four with fuel tanks) compared to two or three larger missiles.

The Marte ER completed its final test firing in November 2021. Full-scale production began in late March 2022 and it then began deliveries to its launch customer, the Qatari Emiri Navy.

== Operational history ==
Iran's Sea Killer Mk 2 saw combat service during the Iran–Iraq War, being used to attack merchant shipping in the Persian Gulf, with at least six ships being hit.

== Variants ==
Sea Killer Mark 1
Short-range beam riding ship-launched anti-ship missile. 10 km range, 35 kilograms (77 lb) warhead. Also designated Nettuno.
Sea Killer Mark 2
Increased range beam-riding ship-launched anti-ship missile with improved two stage rocket. 25+ km range, 70 kilograms (150 lb) warhead. Also designated Vulcano.
Marte Mark 1
Helicopter launched beam riding anti-ship missile, based on Sea Killer Mark 2.
Marte Mark 2
Improved version of Marte, with active radar homing seeker in bulged nose.
- Marte MK2/S

"Short" version of Marte 2 enabling simpler on-board integration onto helicopters.

- Marte MK2/A

Modified version of Marte 2 for launch from fixed wing aircraft, with booster rocket omitted.

- Marte MK2/N

Version of Marte 2 as a surface-to-surface naval missile system for littoral operations.

Marte ER
Marte ER is a sea-skimming, high subsonic anti-ship and land attack missile. Turbojet engine Williams WR WJ-24-8G extends range to over 100 km, total weight of 340 kilograms, first tested in 9 November 2018. The missile is fire-and-forget capable and designed to operates in all weather conditions. The Eurofighter Typhoon can carry up to 6 Marte ER anti-ship missiles.
Mobile Coastal Defence System (MCDS)
Land based system for coastal defence. The system has the capability to launch both Marte MK2/N and / or Marte ER missile. The system needs midcourse guidance to use the maximum range of Marte ER.

== Operators ==
Iran

- 160 Sea Killer/Marte Mk 2 Vulcano, delivered between 1971 and 1972 for Saam frigates

Italy

- Sea Killer Mk 1 Nettuno (evaluation).
- 450 Marte Mk 1 delivered since 1977 for use on SH-3D helicopters
- 180 Marte Mk 2, delivered since 1987 for use on SH-3D helicopters
- 39 Marte Mk 2/S delivered since 2007 for use on AW-101 & SH-90 helicopters

Qatar

- Marte ER, MOU signed 30 March 2016 for coastal defence system
- (50) Marte ER in 2018 deal for NH-90 NFH helicopters

Senegal

- Marte Mk2/N for use on 3 OPV58S OPV

Turkmenistan

- (25) Sea Killer/Marte Mk2/N at least 25 delivered for Dearsan 33m FAC

United Arab Emirates

- 100 Marte Mk2/N, February 2009 order, delivered in 2013 for 12 Ghannatha class Fast Patrol Boats
- (50) Marte Mk2/N order in February 2017, for 93,6 million dollars, delivered in 2018/2019 for 12 Ghannatha class Fast Patrol Boats

Venezuela

- 100 Sea Killer/Marte Mk1 delivered between 1980 and 1982 for AB-212ASW helicopters

== See also ==
- Gabriel – (Israel)
- Sea Skua – (United Kingdom)
- Teseo – (Italy, France)
- Exocet – (France)
- AS.34 Kormoran – (Germany)
- Penguin – (Norway)
- Uran – (Russia)
