= Faramarz Fekr =

Engineer

Faramarz Fekri from the Georgia Institute of Technology, Atlanta was named Fellow of the Institute of Electrical and Electronics Engineers (IEEE) in 2016 for contributions to coding theory and its applications.
