= Faramarz Vakili =

Iranian film director and producer

Faramarz Vakili, is an Iranian director, writer and producer. He was born in 1987 and started his filmmaking career in 2004 first with a few successful documentaries such as Cats and Men, Pardon me, Pahlevan Alimirza and The Melody of Life. Then he came toward docudrama and made a short docudrama in 2010 titled No Entrance.

His first feature film is Jonsouda, 2015, premiered in 33rd Fajr Film Festival in Tehran. www.jonsoudamovie.com
