= Mazeh Faramarzi =

Mazeh Faramarzi مازه فرامرزی
- Village
- Country: Iran
- Province: Chaharmahal and Bakhtiari
- County: Kuhrang
- Bakhsh: Bazoft
- Rural District: Bazoft

Population (2006)
  - Total: 74
- Time zone: UTC+3:30 (IRST)
  - Summer (DST): UTC+4:30 (IRDT)

Mazeh Faramarzi (Persian: مازه فرامرزی, also Romanized as Māzeh Farāmarzī) is a village in Bazoft Rural District, Bazoft District, Kuhrang County, Chaharmahal and Bakhtiari Province, Iran. At the 2006 census, its population was 74, in 12 families. The village is populated by Lurs.
