= AGM-123 Skipper II =

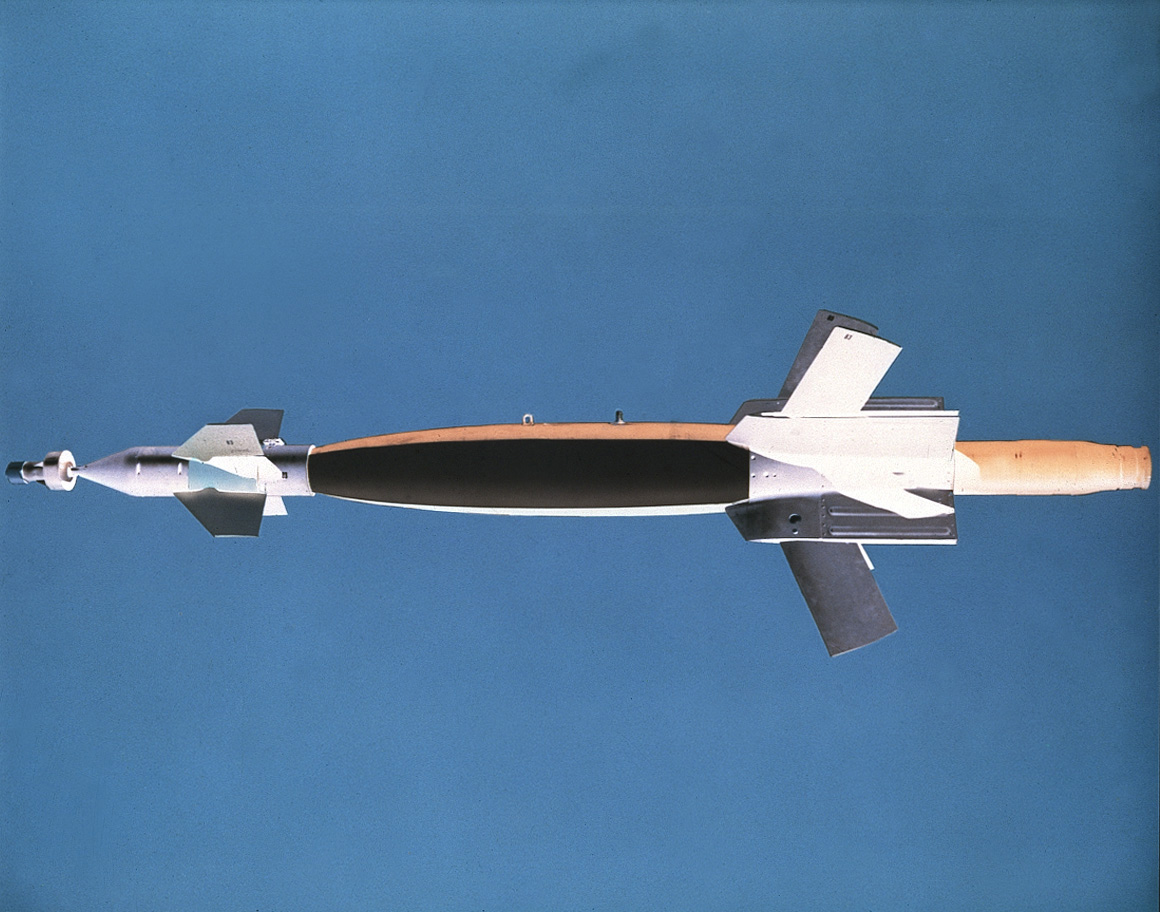
- Type: Rocket assisted, low-level, laser-guided bomb Air-to-surface missile
- Place of origin: United States

Service history
- In service: 1985-1990s
- Used by: United States Navy, United States Marine Corps

Production history
- Manufacturer: Emerson Electric

Specifications
- Mass: 582 kg (1,283 lb)
- Length: 4.3 m (14 ft 1.2 in)
- Diameter: 0.5 m (1 ft 7.6 in)
- Wingspan: 1.6 m (5 ft 3 in)
- Warhead: 1000 lb (450 kg) Mk 83 bomb
- Detonation mechanism: Impact-fuse
- Engine: Aerojet Mk 78 dual-thrust solid-fueled rocket
- Operational range: 25 km (15.5 statute miles)
- Maximum speed: 1,100 km/h (680 mph)
- Guidance system: laser-guidance

AGM-123 Skipper II is a short-range laser-guided missile developed by the United States Navy. The Skipper was intended as an anti-ship weapon, capable of disabling the largest vessels with a 1,000-lb (450-kg) impact-fuzed warhead.

== Design ==
The AGM-123 is composed out of a 1,000 lb (454 kg) Mark 83 low-drag general purpose bomb fitted with a Paveway guidance kit and one Aerojet Mk 78 solid-propellant rocket that fires upon launch. The rocket allows the AGM-123 to be dropped further away from the target than could free-fall bombs, which helps protect the delivery aircraft from surface-to-air-missiles and anti-aircraft artillery near the target.

The AGM-123 was developed at the China Lake Naval Weapons Center and was carried by the A-6E Intruder, A-7 Corsair II, and F/A-18.

== Operational history ==
Four Skipper missiles launched by A-6E Intruders contributed to sinking the Iranian frigate Sahand during Operation Praying Mantis on April 18, 1988.

Skipper missiles were also fired in Operation Desert Storm against Iraqi surface vessels by A-6s and U.S. Marine aircraft.

== Gallery ==
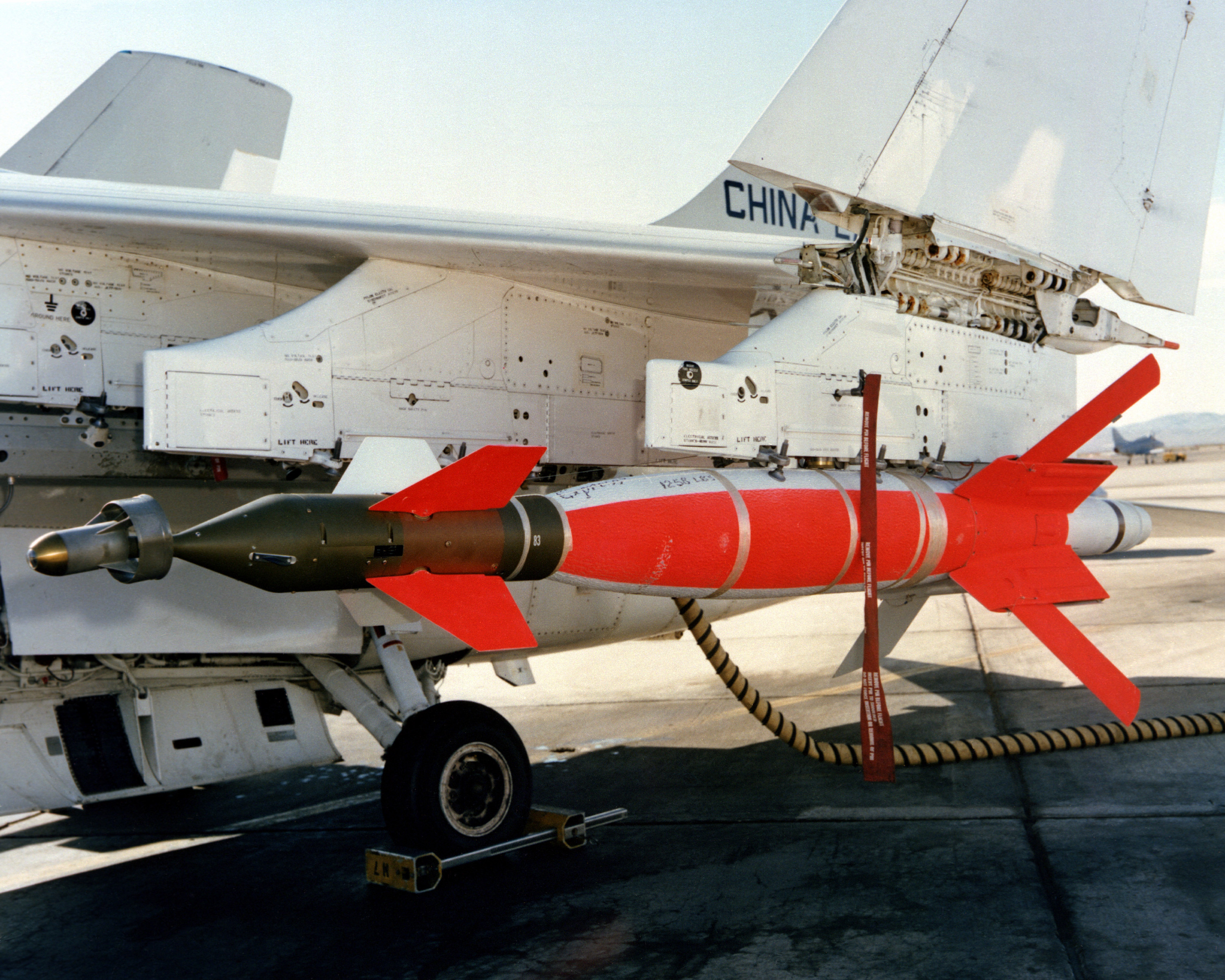
An AGM-123A Skipper II low-level laser-guided missile mounted on the wing pylon of a Vought A-7

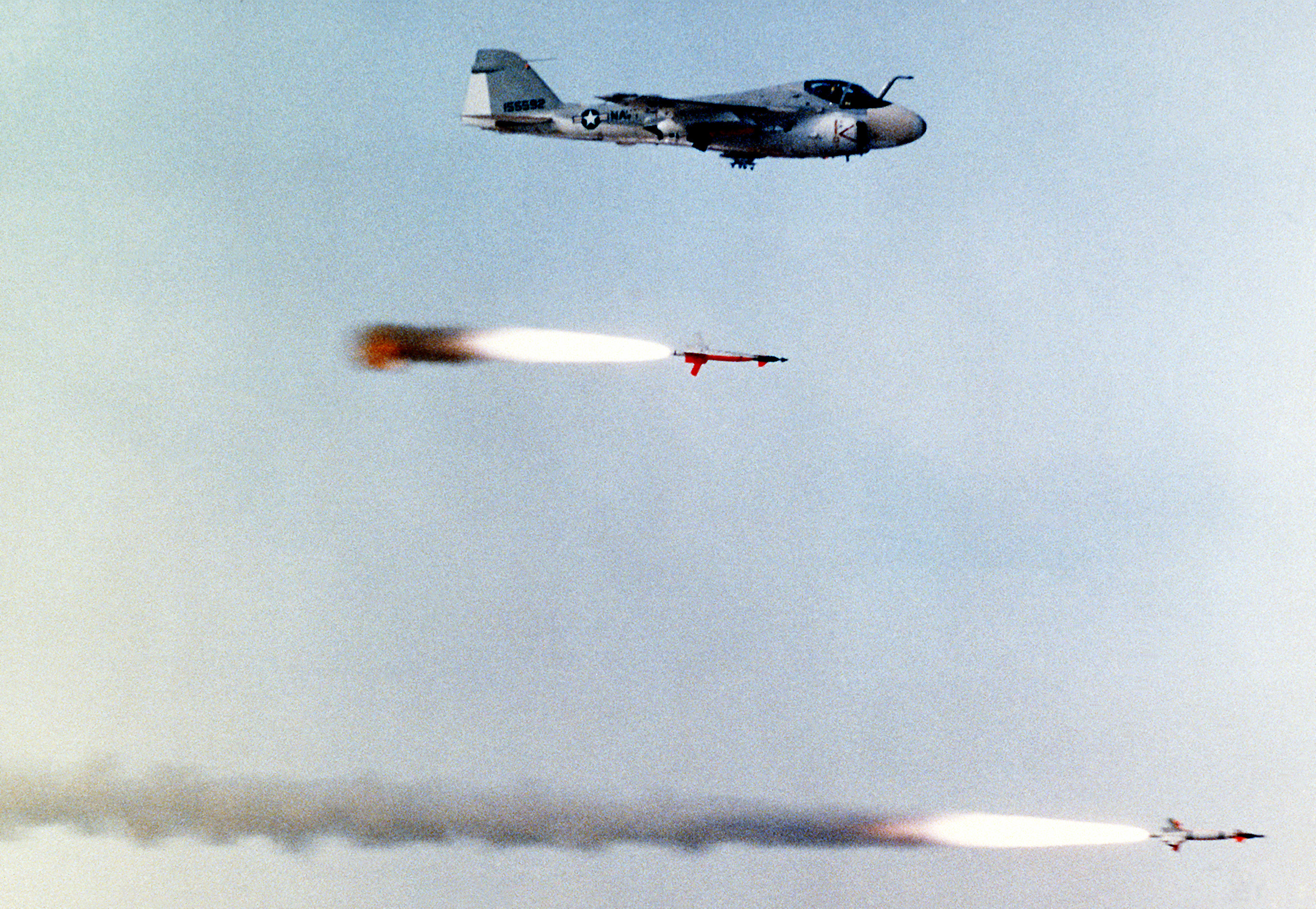
A U.S. Navy Grumman A-6E Intruder as its crew monitors the flight of two AGM-123A low-level, laser-guided missiles

== See also ==
- Armement Air-Sol Modulaire
