= USS Merrill (DD-976) =

Spruance-class destroyer

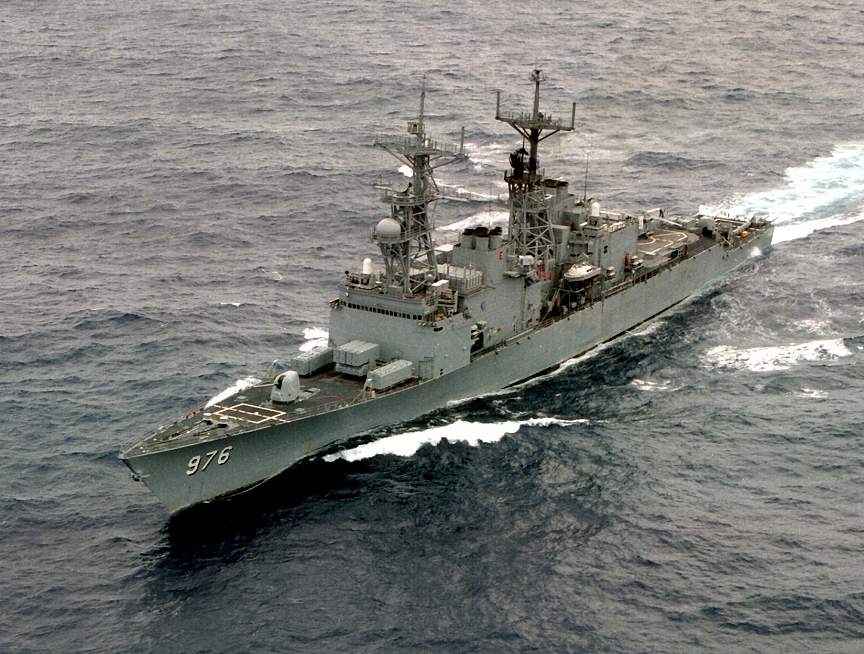
- USS Merrill underway on 1 June 1991

History

United States
- Name: Merrill
- Namesake: Aaron S. Merrill
- Ordered: 26 January 1972
- Builder: Ingalls Shipbuilding
- Laid down: 16 June 1975
- Launched: 1 September 1976
- Acquired: 30 January 1978
- Commissioned: 11 March 1978
- Decommissioned: 26 March 1998
- Stricken: 26 March 1998
- Identification: Callsign: NHKX; Hull number: DD-976
- Motto: Spirit of '76
- Fate: Sunk as target, 1 August 2003
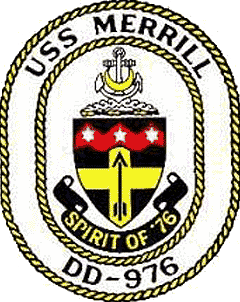
- Badge

General characteristics
- Class & type: Spruance-class destroyer
- Displacement: 8,040 long tons (8,170 t) full load
- Length: 529 ft (161 m) waterline; 563 ft (172 m) overall
- Beam: 55 ft (17 m)
- Draft: 29 ft (8.8 m)
- Installed power: 3 × 501-K17 generator sets (2,000 kW (2,700 hp) each)
- Propulsion: 4 × General Electric LM2500 gas turbines, 2 shafts, 80,000 shp (60 MW)
- Speed: 32.5 knots (60.2 km/h; 37.4 mph)
- Range: 6,000 nmi (11,000 km; 6,900 mi) at 20 knots (37 km/h; 23 mph)
- Complement: 19 officers, 315 enlisted
- Sensors & processing systems: AN/SPS-40 air search radar; AN/SPG-60 fire control radar; AN/SPS-55 surface search radar; AN/SPQ-9 gun fire control radar; Mark 23 TAS automatic detection and tracking radar; AN/SPS-65 missile fire control radar; AN/SQS-53 bow-mounted active sonar; AN/SQR-19 TACTAS towed array passive sonar; Naval Tactical Data System
- Electronic warfare & decoys: AN/SLQ-32 electronic warfare system; AN/SLQ-25 Nixie torpedo countermeasures; Mark 36 SRBOC decoy launching system; AN/SLQ-49 inflatable decoys
- Armament: 2 × 5 in (127 mm) 54 caliber Mark 45 dual purpose guns; 2 × 20 mm Phalanx CIWS Mark 15 guns; 1 × 8 cell ASROC launcher (removed); 1 × 8 cell NATO Sea Sparrow Mark 29 missile launcher; 2 × quadruple Harpoon missile canisters; 2 × Mark 32 triple 12.75 in (324 mm) torpedo tubes (Mk 46 torpedoes); 1 × 61 cell Mk 41 VLS launcher for Tomahawk missiles
- Aircraft carried: 2 × Sikorsky SH-60 Seahawk LAMPS III helicopters
- Aviation facilities: Flight deck and enclosed hangar for up to two medium-lift helicopters

USS Merrill (DD-976), named for Rear Admiral Aaron Stanton Merrill USN (1890–1961), was a Spruance-class destroyer that entered service with the United States Navy in 1978. Merrill served as the US Navy's test platform for the Tomahawk cruise missile. In the 1980s, the destroyer took part in Operation Earnest Will in the Persian Gulf during heightened tensions with Iran. The destroyer was decommissioned in 1998. The vessel was used as a target ship in 2003 and sunk off Hawaii in 2003.

== Service history ==
Merill was laid down on 16 June 1975 by the Ingalls Shipbuilding Division of Litton Industries at Pascagoula, Mississippi. She was launched on 1 September 1976 and commissioned on 11 March 1978.

On 21 August 1980, while on a Western Pacific Ocean deployment, Merrill rescued 62 Vietnamese refugees, over 200 miles (320 km) southeast of Saigon. During the next years, Merrill served as the Navy's test platform for the Tomahawk Cruise Missile Program, earning the Navy Meritorious Unit Commendation. In this function, the ship did not participate in the Pacific Fleet's deployment rotation.

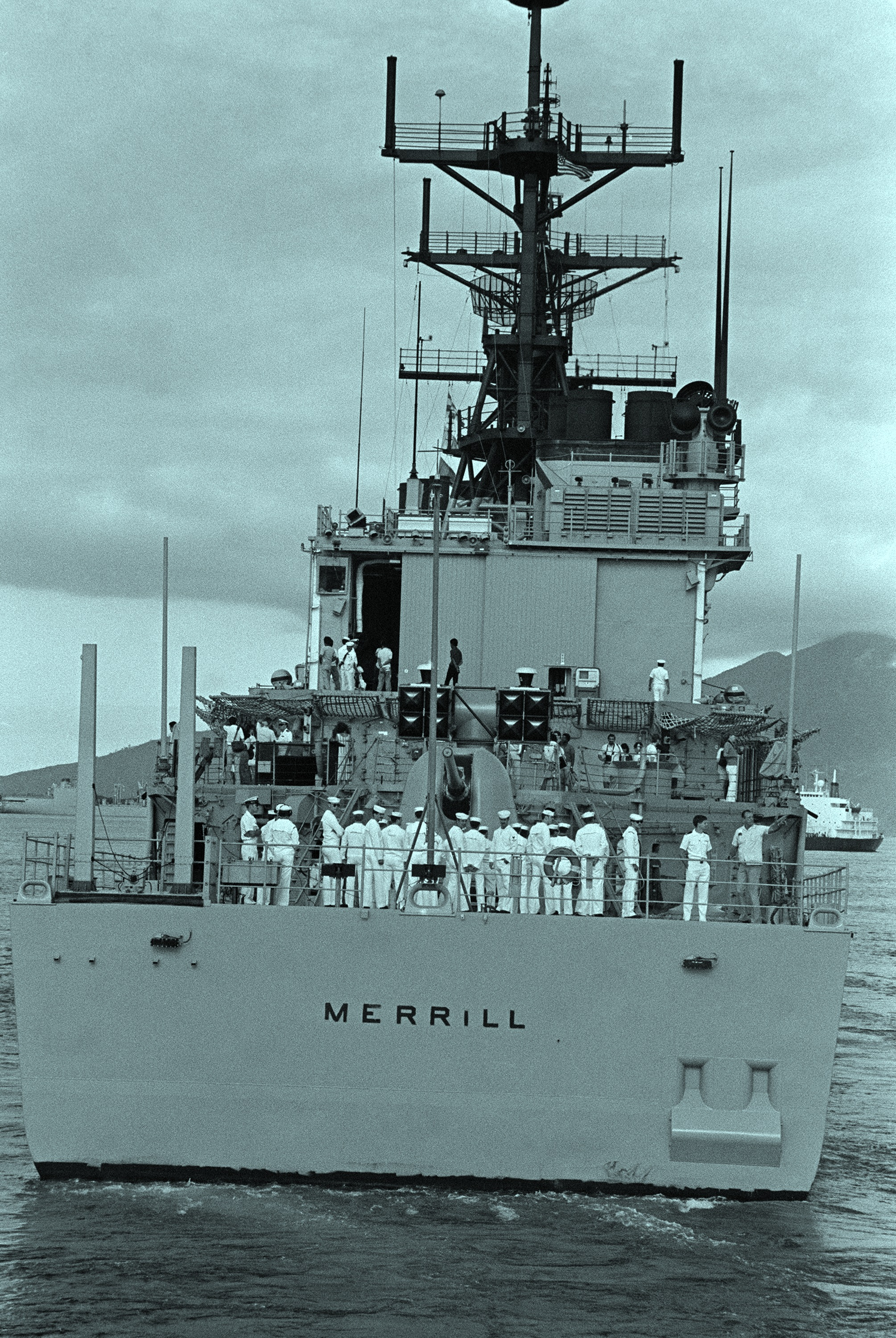
USS Merrill on 1 October 1986

In 1986, while serving as flagship for Destroyer Squadron 21 (COMDESRON 21), Merrill was deployed to the Western Pacific as part of Battle Group Romeo, which featured as its centerpiece the battleship New Jersey, and as such became the first Battleship Battle Group to sail since aircraft carriers assumed that role during World War II.

In 1989, Merrill stood out on a deployment to the Middle East. Serving as a unit of Joint Task Force Middle East, the ship conducted operations in support of Operation Earnest Will and was back in San Diego in May 1990. In August 1990 Merrill was host to the Soviet Navy in San Diego.

Assigned to the USS Abraham Lincoln carrier battle group, Merrill again deployed to the Middle East in 1991. On the way to Persian Gulf Merrill took part in Operation Fiery Vigil in June 1991. Arriving in the region after the ceasefire of the Gulf War, Merrill became the flagship for the coalition minesweeping forces in the Persian Gulf and was the second warship to visit the liberated port of Kuwait City after the Iraqi invasion. 1992 found Merrill underway on a counter-narcotics deployment in the Central America area of operations. In September 1992 Merrill was sent to Long Beach Naval Shipyard for an extensive overhaul which lasted into late 1993. This overhaul consisted of upgrades to the control panels of the radar systems, an entire level added to the ship to contain previously installed CIWS control computers, and most importantly, RAM (Radar Absorbent Material) was added to the entire ship, a first for a destroyer. Upon receiving notice of the planned closure of Long Beach, The USS Merrill relocated to San Diego Naval Base in 1994 and spent the next few months as a test platform in deployment for the RAM material, which was designed to make the ship appear as small as a tug boat on radars.

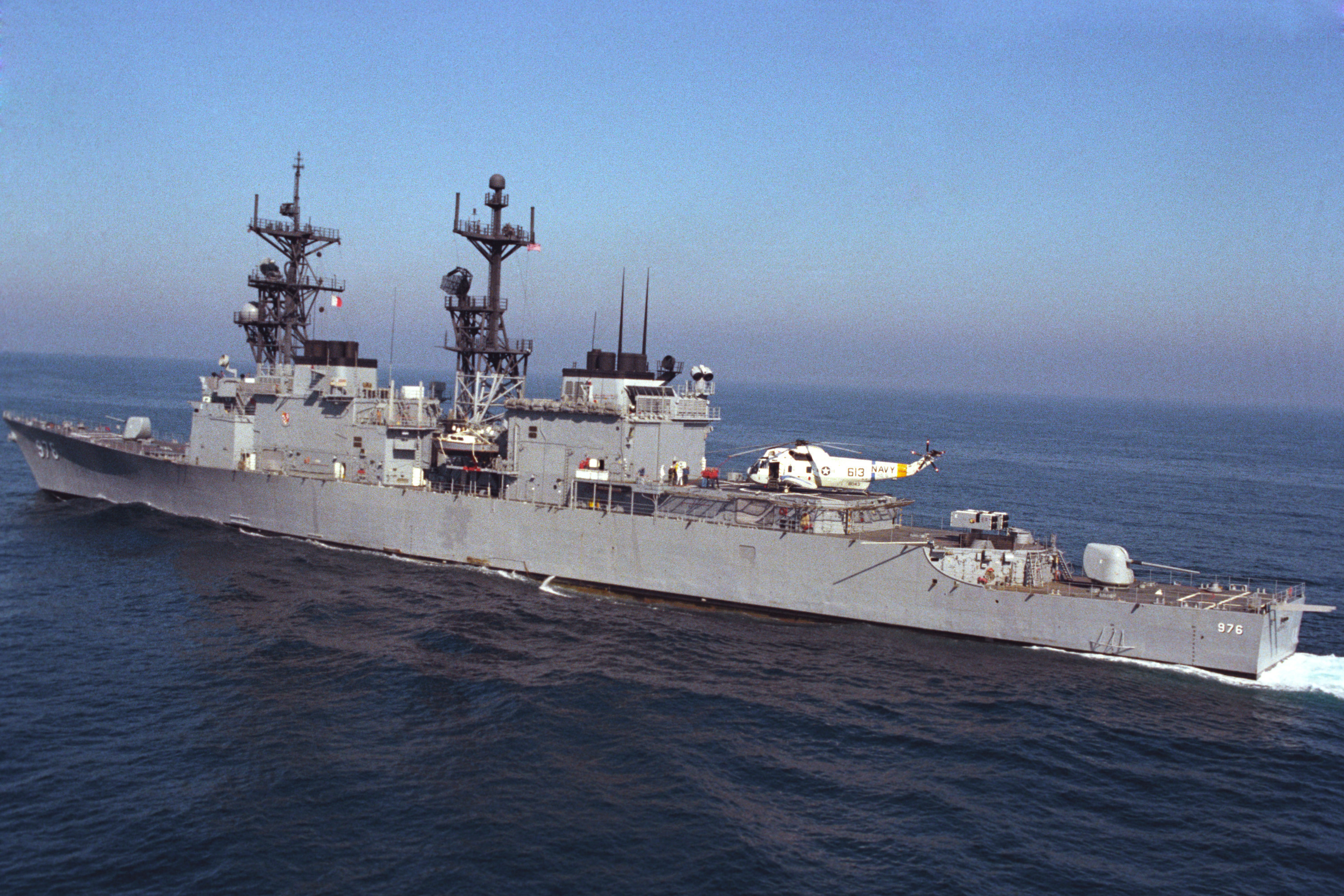
USS Merrill with her SH-3 Sea King on deck, 24 January 1995

Merrill deployed in 1995 as part of the Abraham Lincoln battle group. During the first half of the deployment, the battle group conducted a variety of multinational operations and exercises designed to support U.S. interests and relationships in the Pacific and Indian Oceans, and the Persian Gulf. The battle group maintained a continuous watch on all merchant shipping going to and from Iraq. Numerous ships were queried and boarded to verify their cargo manifests.

In July 1995, as part of a reorganization of the Pacific Fleet's surface ships into six core battle groups and eight destroyer squadrons, Merrill was reassigned to Destroyer Squadron 7. The reorganization was scheduled to be completed by 1 October, with homeport changes to be completed within the following year.

From 10 February through 21 February 1997, Merrill took part in Pacific Joint Task Force Exercise (PACJTFEX) 97–1, off the Southern California coast. The U.S. 3rd Fleet exercise involved 20 ships, fixed-wing aircraft and helicopters from the USS Constellation carrier battle group and USS Boxer Amphibious Ready Group with the 15th Marine Expeditionary Unit embarked. Army, Air Force, National Guard and Coast Guard units also participated. The exercise included various air strike and support missions, maritime interdiction operations, humanitarian operations, operational testing of weapons systems, logistics support, search and rescue, and command and control. Amphibious operations supporting the exercise culminated with an amphibious landing at Camp Pendleton, California, involving surface and helicopter assault forces. PAC JTFEX 97-1 was part of a series of exercises previously named "FLEETEX". The change in name reflected the increasing focus on preparing naval forces for joint operations with other U.S. military services. During the previous several years this exercise placed increasing emphasis on incorporating joint procedures, planning, and command and control structures into task group training.

Merrill then deployed with the Constellation battle group, as part of a routine six-month deployment in the waters of the Indian and Pacific Oceans. The Constellation battle group departed Fifth Fleet's Area of Responsibility (AOR) on 17 August 1997. The battle group had entered the Arabian Sea on 16 May, and conducted high tempo operations there that included more than 4,400 sorties during more than 10 weeks in the Persian Gulf. Operations included exercises with friendly forces in the region. After departing the Persian Gulf, the Constellation battle group concluded its tour in the 5th Fleet with a joint-combined exercise with the Pakistani Armed Forces. Dubbed Inspired Siren 97-2 and Inspired Alert 97–2, the exercises incorporated both surface combatants and air components, respectively. The purpose of this four-day training mission was to exercise the joint-combined naval and air capabilities of both countries, improve their respective levels of readiness and interoperability, and enhance military relations between the two nations.

=== Fate ===
Merrill was decommissioned and stricken 26 March 1998 awaiting disposal at Pearl Harbor Naval Intermediate Ship Maintenance Facility. On 1 August 2003 she was sunk as a target northwest of Hawaii. The wreckage is located at 22°43′53″N 160°29′23″W.

== Gallery ==
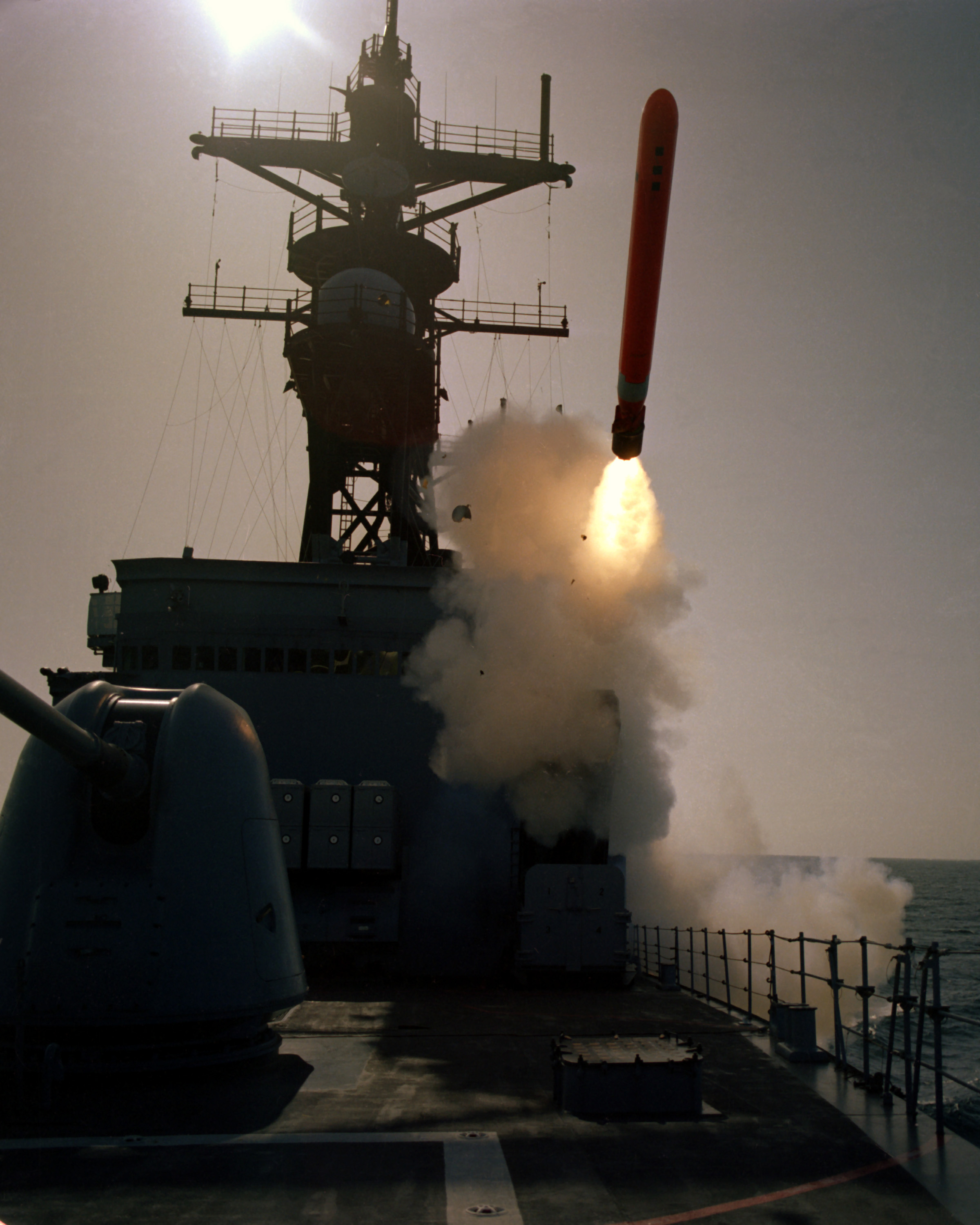
USS Merrill fires her Tomahawk missile on 6 March 1983

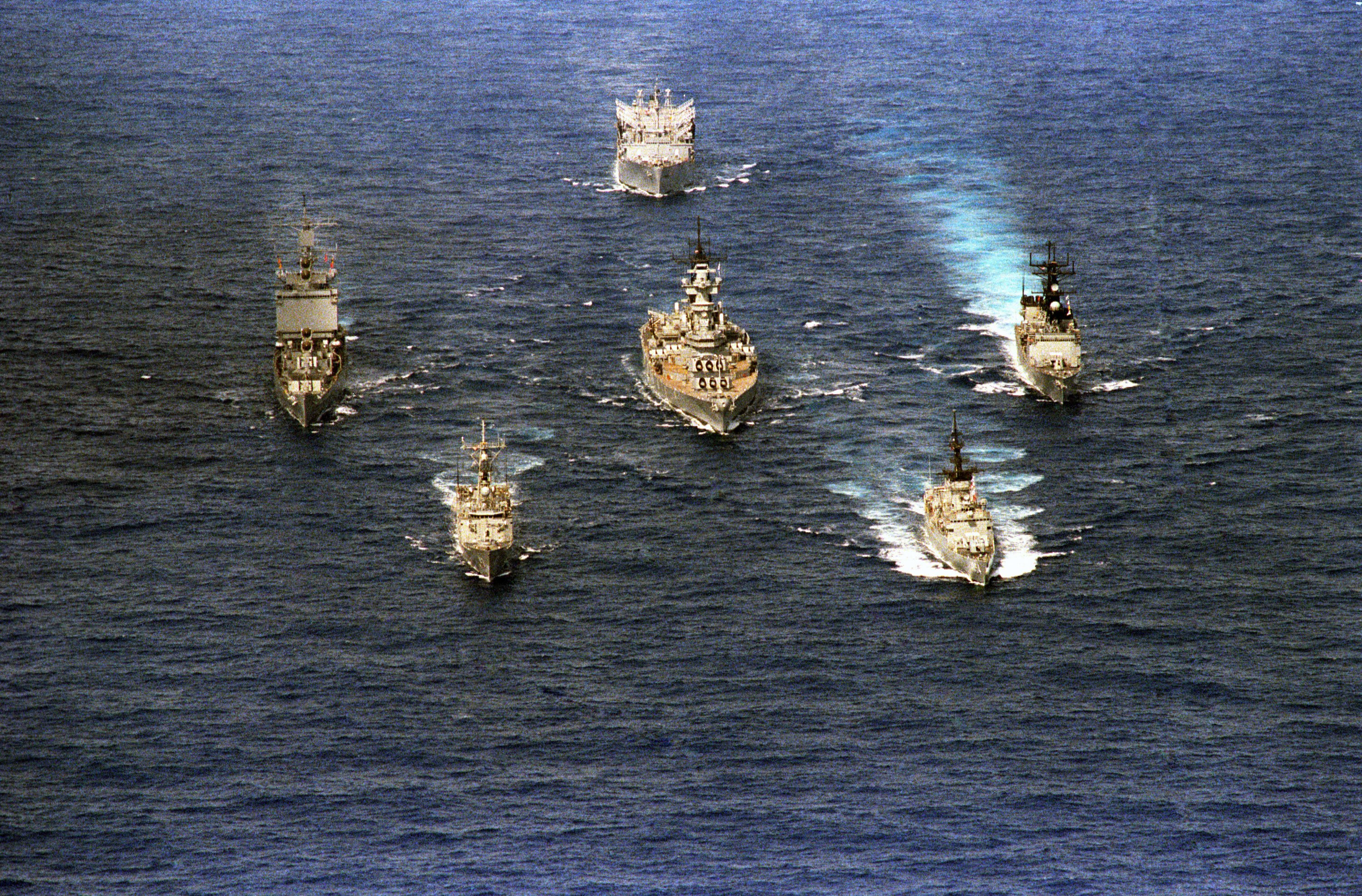
USS Merrill in 1986

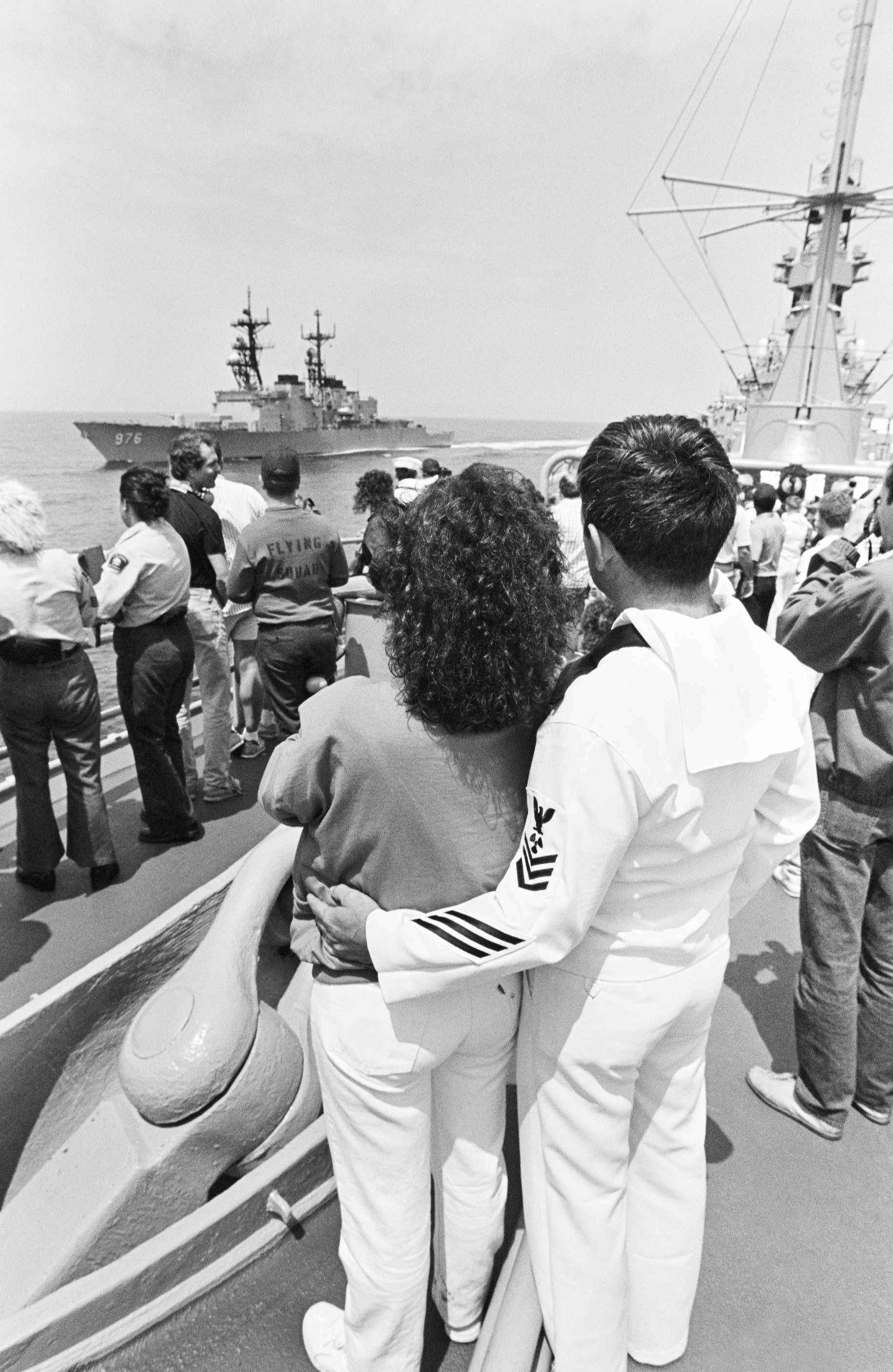
USS Merrill alongside USS Missouri on 24 August 1988

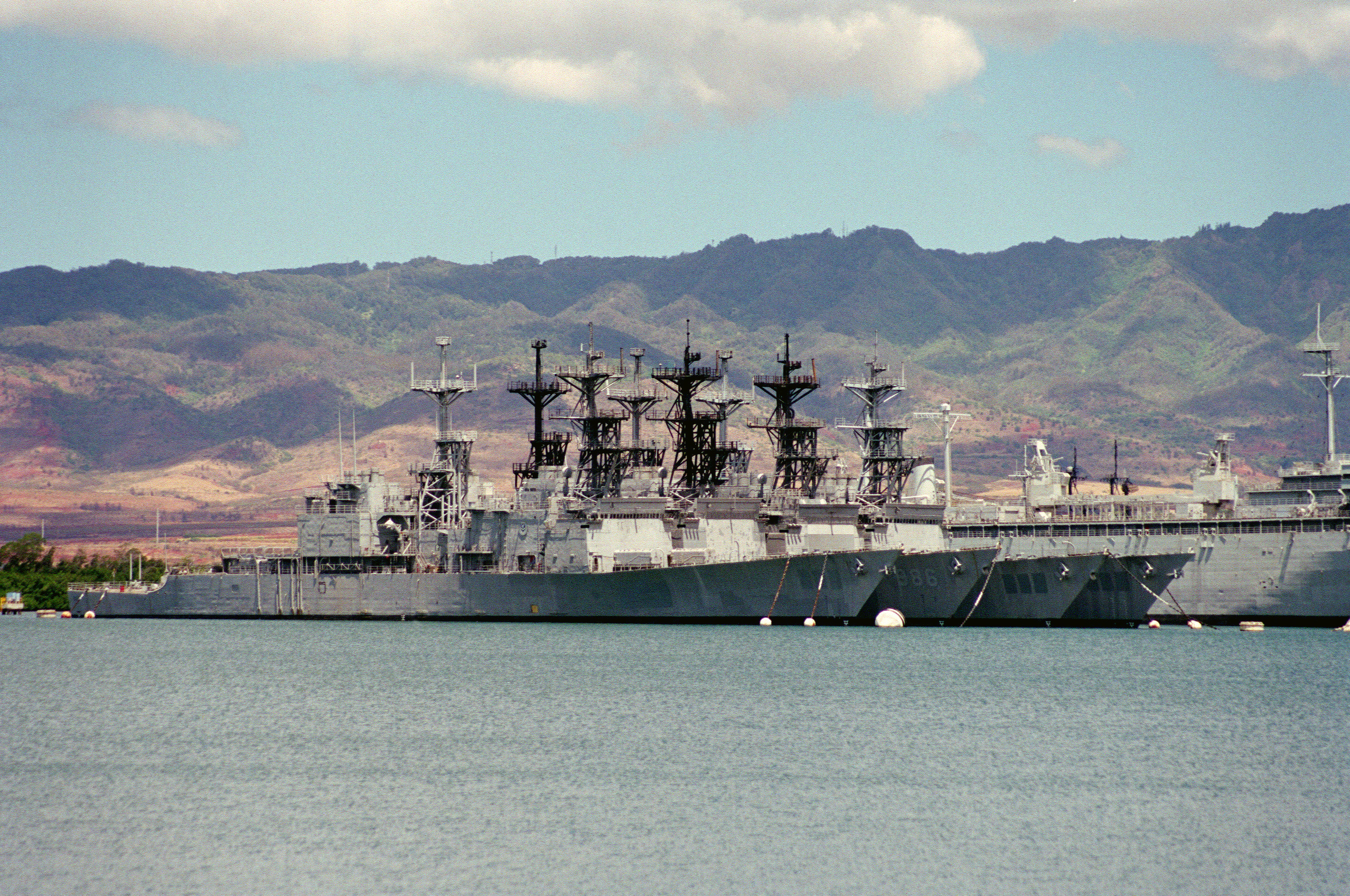
USS Merrill, USS Ingersoll, USS Harry W. Hill and USS Leftwich in June 2000
