= IRIS Sabalan =

Islamic Republic of Iran Navy ship

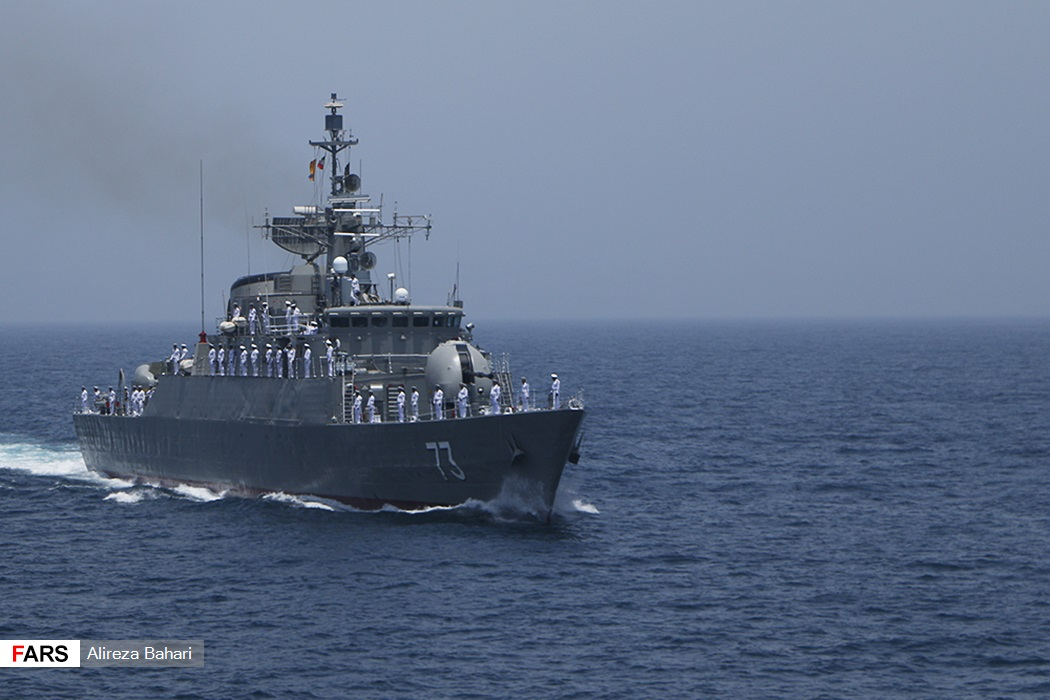
- IRIS Sabalan.

History

Iran
- Name: IIS Rostam
- Namesake: Rostam
- Ordered: 1960
- Builder: Vickers, High Walker (hull only); Vickers, Barrow
- Yard number: 190 (High Walker); 1079 (Barrow)
- Launched: 4 March 1969; 57 years ago.
- Commissioned: 26 May 1972
- Renamed: Sabalan, 1985
- Namesake: Sabalan mountain
- Recommissioned: 1991
- In service: 1972–1988; 1991–2026
- Refit: 1988–1991
- Home port: Bandar-Abbas
- Identification: Pennant number: 73; Code letters: EQAC
- Fate: Sunk during 2026 Iran War

General characteristics
- Class & type: Alvand-class frigate
- Displacement: 1,100 tons (1,540 tons full load)
- Length: 94.5 m (310 ft)
- Beam: 11.07 m (36.3 ft)
- Draught: 3.25 m (10.7 ft)
- Propulsion: 2 shafts, 2 Paxman Ventura cruising diesels, 3,800 bhp (2,830 kW), 17 knots (31 km/h); 2 Rolls-Royce Olympus TM2 boost gas turbines, 46,000 shp (34,300 kW), 39 knots (72 km/h)
- Speed: 39 knots (72 km/h) max
- Range: 5,000 nmi (9,000 km) at 15 knots (28 km/h)
- Complement: 125-146
- Armament: 4 (reportedly now 12) × C-802 anti-ship missiles; 1 × 4.5 inch (114 mm) Mark 8 gun; 1 × twin 35 mm AAA, 2 x single 20 mm AAA; 2 × 81 mm mortars; 2 × 0.50 cal (12.7 mm) machine guns; 1 x Limbo ASW mortar; 2 x triple 12.75 in torpedo tubes

IRIS Sabalan (Persian: سبلان) was an Alvand-class frigate of the Islamic Republic of Iran Navy. She was launched in 1969.

Commissioned in June 1972 as part of a four-ship order, the Sabalan was originally named IIS Rostam, after Rostam, a legendary hero in the Shahnameh. It was renamed after the Islamic revolution after Sabalan, the Iranian mountain.

== Service history ==
During the Iran–Iraq War, the warship became infamous for attacks against the crews of unarmed and often neutral tankers and other merchant ships. Before these attacks, Sabalan's captain would often board the ships and pretend to carry out a friendly inspection, sometimes even dining with the ship's master. Then he would open fire on the ship, sometimes aiming at the ship's bridge and living spaces. Often, the captain would radio his victims "Have a nice day" as Sabalan departed. These actions earned the captain the nickname "Captain Nasty".

Following the spillover of the conflict onto the Persian Gulf, the United States deployed warships in 1987 and 1988 to protect reflagged Kuwaiti shipping in the Persian Gulf. During the convoy operations, dubbed Operation Earnest Will, an Iranian mine severely damaged a U.S. frigate. U.S. forces mounted a one-day retaliation called Operation Praying Mantis. The operation's objectives were to destroy two Iranian oil platforms used for drilling and attack coordination and one unspecified Iranian warship.

On the morning of April 18, 1988, the oil platforms were knocked out. The U.S. forces then turned to look for Iranian frigates in the Strait of Hormuz, which joins the Gulf of Oman and the Persian Gulf. Sabalan's sister frigate Sahand was identified by aircraft from the aircraft carrier USS Enterprise and drawn into a fatal engagement. Another group of A-6 Intruders was sent to the reported location of Sabalan in the strait, where the Sabalan fired at the A-6s at 6.17 p.m. (Gulf time).

At 6.18 p.m., an A-6 dropped a Mk-82 500 pound laser-guided bomb, which left Sabalan paralyzed and on fire. At the Pentagon, Defense Secretary Frank Carlucci, Chairman of the Joint Chiefs Adm. William J. Crowe Jr., and U.S. Central Command head Gen. George B. Crist monitored the situation. After discussion, the men decided to spare the moribund Sabalan, perhaps to prevent further escalation.

Iranian forces towed the damaged ship to the port of Bandar Abbas, and it was eventually repaired and returned to service.

In January 2014 Sabalan and Kharg, a supply ship capable of carrying helicopters, set off from Bandar Abbas, on a reported three-month mission to the United States maritime borders. The mission was described by an Iranian admiral as a response to the ongoing presence of the United States Fifth Fleet, which is based in Bahrain, across the Persian Gulf. However, the trip to the Atlantic Ocean never happened and was called off in April 2014.

It was reported by the Iranian Navy commander in October 2023 that Sabalan has been equipped with 12 anti-ship missiles.

As of 3 March 2026, The Telegraph newspaper wrote that Sabalan was "Suspected sunk" during 2026 Iran war. CENTCOM later released photographs showing her and Alvand sunk following strikes on Bandar Abbas.

== See also ==
- List of Imperial Iranian Navy vessels in 1979
- List of current ships of the Islamic Republic of Iran Navy
