= Maritime Security Belt =

Trilateral naval exercise

Maritime Security Belt, (Note: Russian: Пояс морской безопасности; Chinese: 海上安全带 ; Persian: کمربند امنیت دریایی) also known with the portmanteau CHIRU, is a trilateral naval exercise involving China, Iran and Russia as partners. First held in 2019, it is set to be taken place annually.

== History ==
=== 2019 ===
The first edition of the exercise (Note: According to Dzirhan Mahadzir (14 March 2024), Russia, China and Iran Finish Drills in Gulf of Oman, USNI News, the first edition was held in 2018.) began on 27 December 2019 and took four days. The area of operation was the northern part of the Indian Ocean.

The units participating in the exercise included:

- Iran
  - Alborz (frigate)
  - Sahand (frigate)
  - Bayandor (corvette)
  - Tondar (hovercraft)
  - Shahid Naserinejad (auxiliary ship)
  - Shahid Nazeri (HARTH)
- China
  - Xining (destroyer)
- Russia
  - Yaroslav Mudry (frigate)
  - Elnya (tanker)
  - Viktor Konetsky (tugboat)

2020

The 2020 edition was canceled due to the pandemic of the COVID-19 virus

=== 2021 ===
China was absent in the second version of the exercise when it was started by Russia and Iran on 16 February 2021. It was later announced that the Indian and Chinese navies will also join, but eventually neither took part. On 18 February 2021, the official website of the Indian Navy issued a statement denying participation in the drill. Turkish state-run Anadolu Agency reported that the Indian Navy had cancelled the plan at the last minute, because Tehran said China could join the exercise too and Indians did not want to be together with the Chinese due to recent border skirmishes.

The units participating in the exercise included:

- Iran
  - Jamaran (frigate)
  - Naghdi (corvette)
  - Falakhon (fast attack craft)
  - Shahid Nazeri (HARTH)
- Russia
  - Stoikiy (corvette)
  - Kola (replenishment ship)
  - Yakov Grebelsky (tugboat)

=== 2022 ===
The third version of the exercise was held from 18 January 2022, with a sea phase starting on Friday the 21st over an area of 17,000 square kilometres (6,560 square miles) in the northern Indian Ocean. It included a range of tactical exercises like putting out fires on burning vessels, releasing a hijacked vessel, and shooting at air targets at night.

The units participating in the exercise included:

- Iran
  - Dena (frigate)
  - Jamaran (frigate)
  - Naghdi (corvette)
  - Tabarzin (fast attack craft)
  - Zereh (fast attack craft)
  - Bahregan (auxiliary ship)
  - Ganaveh (auxiliary ship)
  - Shahid Nazeri (HARTH)
- China
  - Ürümqi (118) destroyer)
  - Taihu (889) (replenishment ship)
- Russia
  - Varyag (cruiser)
  - Admiral Tributs (destroyer)
  - Boris Butoma (replenishment ship)

=== 2023 ===
The fourth edition of the exercise was held from March 15 for 4 days in the northern Indian Ocean.

The units participating in the exercise included:

- Iran
  - Jamaran (frigate)
  - Sahand (frigate)
  - Bayandor (corvette)
  - Zereh (fast attack craft)
  - Sirjan (auxiliary ship)
  - Delvar (auxiliary ship)
  - Nayband (auxiliary ship)
  - Bahregan (auxiliary ship)
  - Shahid Mahmoudi (auxiliary ship)
  - Shahid Nazeri (HARTH)
- China
  - Nanning (destroyer)
- Russia
  - Admiral Gorshkov (frigate)
  - Kama (tanker)

=== 2024 ===
The 2024 edition of the exercise was held from 11 March 2024, with a sea phase between 12–14 March in the Gulf of Oman, and then a shore phase. For the first time there were observers from other countries present (Pakistan, Kazakhstan, Azerbaijan, Oman, India and South Africa).

The units participating in the exercise included:

- Iran
  - Jamaran (76) (frigate)
  - Dena (frigate)
  - Alvand (71) (frigate)
  - Shahid Soleimani (FS313-01) (IRGCN corvetete)
  - Shahid Abu Mahdi al-Muhandis (PC313-01) (IRGCN patrol ship)
  - Shahid Mahmoudi (auxiliary ship)
  - other craft
- China
  - Ürümqi (118) (destroyer)
  - Linyi (547) (frigate)
  - Dongpinghu (902) (fleet oiler)
- Russia
  - Varyag (cruiser)
  - Marshal Shaposhnikov (543) (destroyer)

=== 2025 ===
The 2025 edition of the exercise was held in March 2025, with a sea phase from Monday the 10th March in the Gulf of Oman. Azerbaijan, South Africa, Oman, Kazakhstan, Pakistan, Qatar, Iraq, the UAE, and Sri Lanka have sent observers to the drills.

The units participating in the exercise included:

- Iran
  - Jamaran (76) (frigate)
  - Alvand (71) (frigate)
  - Shahid Sayyad Shirazi (FS313-03) (IRGCN corvette)
  - Shahid Nazeri (IRGCN patrol craft)
  - 10 ships in total
- China
  - Baotou (133) (destroyer)
  - Gaoyouhu (904) (fleet oiler)
- Russia
  - Hero of the Russian Federation Aldar Tsydenzhapov (339) (corvette)
  - Rezkiy (343) (corvette)
  - Pechenga (fleet oiler)

=== 2026 ===
The 2026 edition took place in second part of February 2026, in a view of an international tension and US deployment in the Gulf, prior to Israeli-US aggression against Iran.

The units participating in the exercise included:

- Iran
  - ?
- China
  - Tangshan (122) ) (destroyer Type 052DL)
  - Daqing (576) (frigate Type 054A)
  - Taihu (889) (replenishment ship Type 903A)
- Russia
  - Marshal Shaposhnikov (543) (destroyer)
  - Boris Butoma (replenishment ship)

== See also ==
- CRINK
