= List of ship commissionings in 1964 =

The list of ship commissionings in 1964 includes a chronological list of all ships commissioned in 1964.

	Operator	Ship	Flag	Class and type	Pennant	Other notes
January	Rederi Ab Vikinglinjen	Drotten	Finland	Passenger ship		Bought from Rederi AB Gotland
22 February	United States Navy	La Salle		Raleigh-class amphibious transport dock	AGF-3	
7 March	United States Navy	Annapolis		Commencement Bay-class escort carrier modified into communications relay ship	AGMR-1	Former USS Gilbert Islands
21 March	United States Navy	Cochrane		Charles F. Adams-class destroyer	DDG-21	
9 May	Rederi AB Slite	Apollo	Sweden	Ferry		For Ålandspilen traffic
15 May	Imperial Iranian Navy	Bayandor		Bayandor-class corvette	PF-103	
13 June	United States Navy	Richmond K. Turner		Leahy-class cruiser	CG-20	
16 June	German Navy	Braunschweig		Köln-class frigate	F225	
30 June	French Navy	Jeanne d'Arc		Helicopter carrier and cruiser hybrid	R97	
22 July	Imperial Iranian Navy	Naghdi		Bayandor-class corvette	PF-104	
14 November	Black Sea Shipping Company	Ivan Franko	Soviet Union	Ivan Franko-class passenger ship		First in class
21 December	United States Navy	Garcia		Garcia-class ocean escort	DE-1040	
28 December	Soviet Navy	Admiral Fokin		Project 58 Groznyy-class cruiser		
30 December	Soviet Navy	Admiral Golovko		Project 58 Groznyy-class cruiser		
Unknown date	U.S. Fish and Wildlife Service	Pribilof	United States	Cargo liner		Transferred from United States Army
