= IRIS Kharg =

Modified Ol-class fleet replenishment oiler of the Islamic Republic of Iran Navy

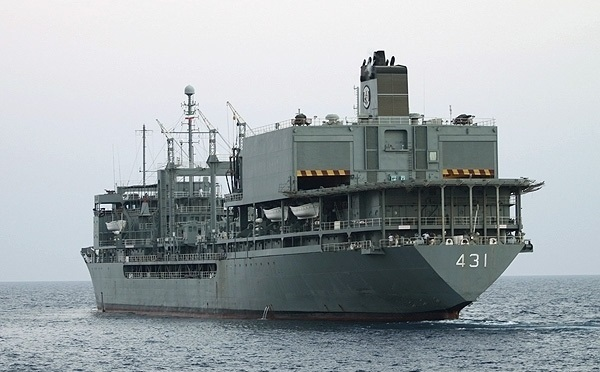

History

Iran
- Name: Kharg
- Namesake: Kharg Island
- Operator: Islamic Republic of Iran Navy
- Ordered: October 1974
- Builder: Swan Hunter, Wallsend-on-Tyne
- Cost: £40 million
- Yard number: 98
- Laid down: 27 January 1976
- Launched: 3 February 1977
- Sponsored by: Gholam Reza Pahlavi
- Completed: 25 April 1980
- Maiden voyage: 5 October 1984
- Out of service: 2 June 2021
- Refit: 1984; 1994; 2014–2016
- Home port: Bandar Abbas
- Identification: Pennant number: 431; IMO number: 7500633; Code letters: EQCA
- Fate: Sank on 2 June 2021 after catching fire

General characteristics
- Class & type: Ol-class replenishment ship
- Tonnage: 18,880 gross tonnage (GT); 9,517 tons deadweight (DWT)
- Displacement: 11,242 t (11,064 long tons) standard; 33,544 t (33,014 long tons) full load
- Length: 207.15 m (679 ft 8 in)
- Beam: 25.5 m (83 ft 8 in)
- Draft: 9.14 m (30 ft 0 in)
- Installed power: 2 × boilers
- Propulsion: 2 × geared turbines, 20,040 kW (26,870 shp); 1 × shaft
- Speed: 21.5 knots (39.8 km/h; 24.7 mph)
- Complement: 248
- Armament: 1 × OTO Melara 76 mm/62 gun; 4 × USSR 23 mm/80 guns; 2 × 12.7 mm machine guns
- Aircraft carried: 3 helicopters
- Aviation facilities: 2 hangars, 1 helipad

Service record
- Part of: Southern Fleet; • 1st Naval Region
- Commanders: Capt. Faramarz Khoshmanesh (1980s); Capt. Ehsan Nasir (current)
- Operations: Iran–Iraq War (1984–1988); Numbered naval groups (since 2009): 3rd; 7th; 9th; 12th; 18th; 22nd; 24th; 27th; 29th; 54th; 55th; 59th; 63rd; 66th

IRIS Kharg (Persian: خارگ) was a modified Ol-class fleet replenishment oiler of the Islamic Republic of Iran Navy, named after Kharg Island.

Built by Swan Hunter in the United Kingdom and launched in 1977, Kharg was delivered to Iran in 1984. She was its largest naval vessel based on tonnage until the commissioning of IRIS Makran in early 2021.

On 2 June 2021, Kharg caught fire and sank in the Gulf of Oman near the Iranian town of Jask, some 140 kilometres (87 mi) from the Strait of Hormuz.

== Design ==
According to the Combat Fleets of the World, the ship was "greatly modified" in comparison to its Ol-class sister ships in service of the British Royal Fleet Auxiliary. The ship's design was described by Jane's Fighting Ships as "incorporating some of the features" of the class, and fitted to carry dry stores and ammunition in addition to fuel.

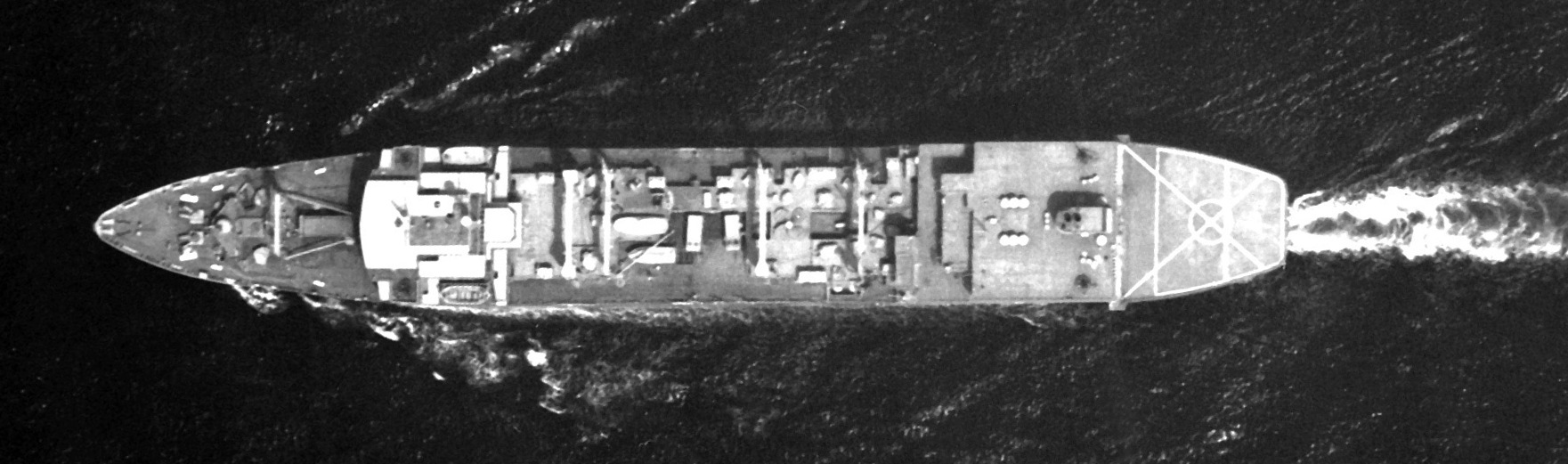
Aerial view of Kharg

A silhouette of Kharg with a helicopter on her deck

Kharg displaced 11,242 tonnes (11,064 long tons) of standard load and up to 33,544 tonnes (33,014 long tons) at full load. It had a gross tonnage of 18,880 and a deadweight tonnage of 9,517 tonnes (9,367 long tons). According to Jane's the vessel was 207.2 m (679 ft 9 in) long, had a beam of 26.5 m (86 ft 11 in) and a draft of 9.2 m (30 ft 2 in). The Combat Fleets of the World records the dimensions slightly differently, with 207.15 m (679 ft 8 in), 25.50 m (83 ft 8 in) and 9.14 m (30 ft 0 in) for length, beam and draft respectively.

Its originally installed machinery included a pair of two-drum boilers built by Babcock & Wilcox, that rotated two Westinghouse geared turbine sets. The system was designed to generate 7,000 kW of electricity, and to provide 20.04 megawatts (26,870 hp) for her single shaft coupled with the propeller. The ship was capable of reaching a nominal top speed of 21.5 knots (39.8 km/h; 24.7 mph).

Its original navigation radar was manufactured by Decca Radar, a Decca 1229 model working on I-band, while the installed tactical air navigation system was a U.S.-made URN 20. It was also fitted with Inmarsat.

It was armed with an OTO Melara 76-millimetre (3.0 in)/62 compact gun on its forecastle, as it was designed. The planned armament included two Bofors 40 mm (1.6 in) AA guns, one on the helicopter deck and the other on the forecastle pedestal, that were never installed. It was equipped with four Soviet 23 mm (0.91 in)/80 anti-aircraft autocannons arranged in two twin mounts, as well as two 12.7 mm (0.50 in) heavy machine guns.

Its crew consisted of 248 officers and men. Kharg had a helipad with twin hangars, giving it sufficient capacity to embark three helicopters.

== Operational capabilities ==
The International Institute of Strategic Studies (IISS) classified Kharg as an AORH, i.e., fleet replenishment oiler with replenishment at sea (RAS) capability and hangar. Only two other Iranian vessels are capable of conducting RAS operations, the Bushehr and the 230-metre (755 ft) long Makran, which was commissioned in 2021.

An assessment published by Stratfor in 2014, mentions that Kharg was an essential long-distance blue-water asset for the IRIN because of its ability to extend the range of Iranian warships, adding that "without this vessel, the small number of Iranian frigates would be unable to embark on extended deployments without consistent and frequent port visits along the way".

Eric H. Arnett, a project leader at Stockholm International Peace Research Institute (SIPRI), commented that Kharg could provide extra operational flexibility for the Iranian fleet and its capacity to carry large and heavy helicopters like the Sikorsky SH-3 Sea King could improve the anti-submarine warfare abilities of the naval group it belonged to.

Christopher Harmer of the Institute for the Study of War found the ship's ability to lift heavy cargo of particular interest. He argued that in view of the sanctions against Iran, Kharg was potentially ideal for safe transfer of valuable or politically sensitive assets, such as imported military equipment, gold, or currency. In such a scenario, Kharg would have been the vessel supported by the warship it accompanied (an escort), rather than vice versa. According to Harmer, the fact that it was a naval vessel would deter foreign navies from attempting to prevent its operations. After Kharg's 2011 visit to Syria via the Suez Canal, U.S. Navy officer Joshua C. Himes opined that "the Kharg will raise suspicion simply due to its logistics capacity and potential to transport weapons/materiel to Iranian surrogates in the region".

== Construction and commissioning ==
Iran ordered the ship from the English shipyard Swan Hunter in October 1974 in a contract worth £40 million (equivalent to $54 million). Kharg was laid down on 27 January 1976, launched on 3 February 1977 by Gholam Reza Pahlavi and named by Manijeh Pahlavi, a member of the royal family. R. J. Daniel, a Royal Corps of Naval Constructors officer, wrote in his memoirs that the ceremonial ship launching was attended by the wife of the Shah's brother, and a cleric wearing a black turban blessed the battle honors but got the name of the ship wrong in his first attempt. It ran some trials in November 1978, but delays in fitting-out postponed its commissioning by the Imperial Iranian Navy and shortly afterward the Iranian Revolution took place. In August 1979, it was reported that the Interim Government of Iran intended to cancel the contract, and as a result Swan Hunter was looking for a new purchaser.

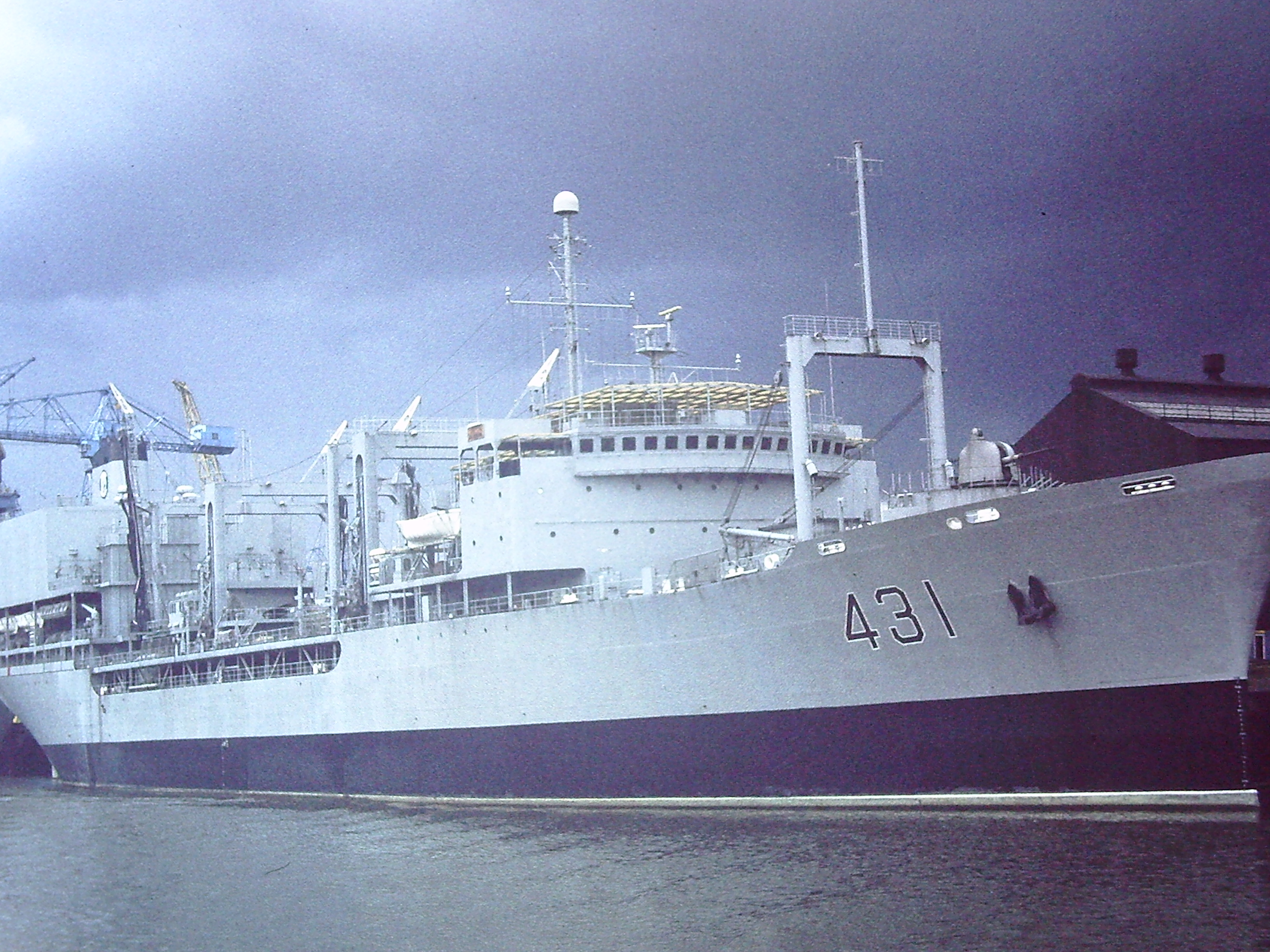
Kharg moored at Walker Naval Yard in 1982

It was painted in battleship grey and between September 1979 and February 1980, the Kharg undertook sea trials in secrecy. Though it was delivered to the Iranian government on 25 April 1980, the British government refused to issue an export license for the ship. This resulted in Kharg's some 200 crew members being unable to leave the United Kingdom. Swan Hunter declared that it was uninvolved in any political implications and considered building Kharg a "straightforward commercial contract". The Guardian noted similarities between the complications over the delivery of the Kharg and the seizure of the battleship Reşad V, which was ordered by the Ottoman Navy from Vickers before the First World War; upon the outbreak of war, the British government seized the battleship and incorporated it into the Royal Navy.

The Iranian government initiated negotiations to secure the export license, with the British government informing the Iranians that as long as the Iranian government refused to release their American hostages, Kharg would not be issued with an export license. After the hostages were returned to the United States, the export license remained unissued and in August 1981 the Foreign Office declared that the ship would not be issued an export license for the foreseeable future, citing the detention of a British national in Iran, Andrew Pyke, as the reason. Pyke was released in February 1982 and in July the Iranian government sent three high-ranking officers to inspect the Kharg. On 10 July 1984, Kharg arrived at Tyne Shiprepairers for overhaul and it started sea trials on 4 September. Kharg left the dock for Iran on 5 October 1984, after the British government approved its export without any armaments on the grounds that it was "not suitable for use in the war against Iraq".

== Service history ==
Known port calls made by Kharg

=== 1980–1999 ===
Though completed in 1980, Kharg was not present for more than half of the Iran–Iraq War. It was added to the order of battle in 1984 and served almost three years in the war, supporting Iranian warships by refuelling, and carrying ammunition and supplies. In August 1987, Kharg led a fleet of six vessels, including IRIS Riazi and aided by two Sikorsky CH-53 Sea Stallion helicopters, to conduct a minesweeping operation in the Sea of Oman. The area of operation extended 10 nautical miles (19 km; 12 mi) east of the Fujairah to the Khor Fakkan. Reports indicated that during the operation, American and French warships were nearby and exchanged radio communications with Iranians for identification without any further contact. When US forces carried out Operation Praying Mantis in April 1988, the ship was stationed at its home port of Bandar Abbas Naval Base.

Kharg was refitted in 1994.

It visited Jeddah on 7 March 1998, marking the first port call of an Iranian naval ship to Saudi Arabia since 1979.

=== 2000–2021 ===
On 31 August 2009, Kharg, along with the frigate IRIS Sabalan, formed the 3rd naval group and left home for an anti-piracy mission in the Arabian Sea and the Gulf of Aden that lasted 73 days until 17 November 2009. During its next, similar mission it sailed about 1,900 nmi (3,500 km; 2,200 mi) to support the same warship as part of the 7th naval group for 92 days, from 17 March to 17 June 2010. Later that year, Kharg supported IRIS Alvand in another Aden anti-piracy mission from 28 August to 15 November 2010.

Kharg entered the Suez Canal on 22 February 2011, with the frigate Alvand, on a deployment reported to be a training mission to Latakia, Syria. While docked at Latakia, a new cooperation agreement between Iran and Syria was signed aboard Kharg. The two ships, which comprised the 12th naval group, were on a mission from 27 January until they returned home on 21 March 2011, and in the Red Sea they saved a Hong Kong merchant vessel from Somali pirates.

It entered the Suez Canal again on 18 February 2012, after briefly docking at Jeddah, Saudi Arabia. It was sent along with the corvette IRIS Naghdi of the 18th naval group on a combined mission involving anti-piracy, training and intelligence collecting activities, lasting for 64 days from 22 January to 26 March 2012. During this mission, it sailed some 12,000 nmi (22,000 km; 14,000 mi) as far as the Mediterranean Sea and the personnel performed the Hajj. The two ships were together as the 22nd naval group, deployed for anti-piracy measures in the Red Sea between 1 September and 14 November 2012. They docked briefly at Port Sudan, which was described as an "unprecedented visit". The two also engaged Somali pirates during the mission and released two hijacked merchant vessels in April, including the Bolivian-flagged bulk carrier Eglantine (whose deck was cleared by commandos), as well as the Panamanian-flagged cargo ship Xiang Hua Men. The mission was reportedly "closely monitored by Western and Israeli militaries".

As the very first IRIN vessels to enter the Pacific Ocean, Kharg and the frigate Sabalan were named the 24th naval group and made a 13,500 nmi (25,000 km; 15,500 mi) journey to Jinjiang, China. The two ships made a port call at Colombo, Sri Lanka, en route. The voyage started on 22 January and lasted 72 days, ending on 4 April 2013. The mission was described as the "longest range deployment in Iranian naval history".

On 19 August 2013, it along with Sabalan comprised the 27th naval group and undertook another anti-piracy and intelligence operation near Bab-el-Mandeb. It was replaced by the landing ship IRIS Larak in the middle of that mission.

It was teamed up again with Sabalan as the 29th naval group, departing for a scheduled three-month cruise to the Atlantic Ocean, starting on 21 January 2014. In mid-April, the plan was called off and the two were ordered to return.

Bellingcat reported that satellite imagery showed Kharg being moved to a floating drydock in August 2015, having been berthed at the ISOICO shipyard, Bostanu, since November 2014. It left the floating drydock in January 2016. During its time in drydock, it underwent a major refit that included an overhaul of its boiler, the replacement of its steam turbines, and replacing and upgrading its navigation systems. Iranian officials said that the new systems were built domestically.

Its first post-refit deployment was to the Bab-el-Mandeb in June 2018, supporting Sabalan and Naghdi of the 54th and 55th naval groups, respectively. It returned home on 21 August 2018.

On 8 December 2018, Kharg teamed up again with the frigate Alvand as the 59th naval group and departed for an intelligence collection and escort operation in the Gulf of Aden. The two navigated a total of 5,988 nmi (11,090 km; 6,891 mi), and their mission concluded on 20 January 2019.

Kharg was tasked to support the newly-commissioned IRIS Sahand in its first oceangoing mission, including tanker escort and maritime patrol in the Gulf of Aden and the Red Sea. The voyage of the 63rd naval group lasted 100 days from 26 August to 29 October 2019.

It departed home on 30 January 2020, as the ship supporting the corvette IRIS Bayandor in a voyage to cross the Strait of Malacca. The 66th naval group anchored at the Port of Tanjung Priok, Jakarta, between 25 and 28 February to commemorate the 70th anniversary of Indonesia–Iran relations. The mission was partly for training purposes, and Kharg carried hundreds of cadets from the naval academy.

=== Sinking ===
As of 2:25 a.m. on 2 June 2021, Kharg was on fire and sank near Jask in the Gulf of Oman at approximately 8:30 a.m. All 400 crew were rescued, with 33 reported injured. The ship was reported to have been several days into a training mission. The ship sank in a region of sensitive waterways around the Strait of Hormuz through which about 20% of the world oil trade passes, and where there have been accusations of attacks on ships of enemies Iran and Israel, with Israel attacking a dozen Iranian oil tankers bound for Syria in violation of an oil embargo, since late 2019, and Iran reported to have attacked ships with limpet mines. Iran did not immediately give the cause of the sinking, but a fire was reported to have started in the ship's engine room at approximately 11:00 a.m. on 1 June. Satellite footage shows its wreck, having sunk in shallow waters, lying on its starboard side, with the bottom of the hull above water, and with much of the hull, port bridge wing, helo hangar, and flight deck visible from above.

== See also ==
- List of former Iranian naval vessels
