= Bayandur (disambiguation) =

The Bayandur is a Turkic tribe.

Bayandur may also refer to:

- Bayandur, Armenia
- Vaghatur, Armenia
- Bayandur, Azerbaijan

== See also ==
- Bayandor (disambiguation)
- Bayannur
- Bayandun
