= Bayandor =

Bayandor (Persian: بايندر) may refer to:

- Bayandor-e Olya, a village in Kermanshah Province, Iran
- Bayandor-e Sofla, a village in Kermanshah Province, Iran
- Bayendar, a village in Zanjan Province, Iran
- Darioush Bayandor, Iranian diplomat
- Gholamali Bayandor (1898-1941), Iranian admiral
- Bayandor-class corvette, ships in the Iranian Navy
