= List of Imperial Iranian Navy vessels in 1979 =

The following vessels were in commission, planned or under construction for Imperial Iranian Navy in 1979.

== Overview ==
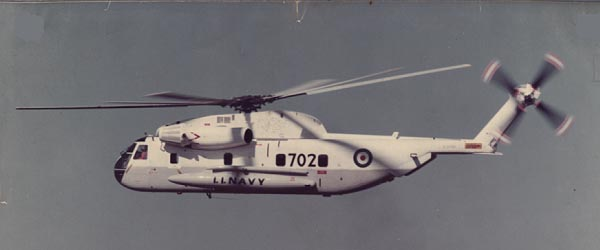
Sikorsky CH-53 Sea Stallion

As of 1978–1979, Iranian Navy had the following equipment according to The Statesman's Yearbook:

Personnel
Total forces	~22,000
Vessels
Destroyer	3
Fast frigate	4
Corvette	4
Coastal minesweeper	3
Inshore minesweeper	2
Patrol boat	17
Hovercraft	14
Landing ship	2
Landing craft	1
Fleet supply ship	2
Repair ship	1
Imperial Yacht	2
Oiler	2
Survey vessel	3
Water carrier	1
Tug	3
Coastguard Cutter	30
Custome craft	2
Naval aviation
Aircraft	12
Maritime helicopter	36
Source: The Statesman's Year-Book

== Commissioned vessels ==
Ships	Pennant number	Origin	Picture	Class	Displacement	Note
Destroyer (3)
IIS Artemiz (ex-HMS Sluys)	51	United Kingdom		Battle-class destroyer	3,410 tons full load	
IIS Babr (ex-USS Zellars) IIS Palang (ex-USS Stormes)	61 62	United States		Allen M. Sumner-class destroyer	2,200 tons full load	
Frigate (4)
IIS Saam IIS Zaal IIS Rostam IIS Faramarz	71 72 73 74	United Kingdom		Saam-class frigate	1,540 tons full load	
Corvette (4)
IIS Bayandor IIS Naghdi IIS Milanian IIS Kahnamoie	81 82 83 84	United States		Bayandor-class corvette	1,135 tons full load	

== Planned vessels ==
Ships	Pennant number	Origin	Picture	Class	Displacement	Note
Submarine (9)
IIS Kousseh (ex-USS Trout) IIS Nahang (ex-USS Wahoo) IIS Dolfin (ex-USS Tang)	101 102 103	United States		Tang-class submarine	2,100 tons surfaced 2,700 tons submerged	First submarine delivered on 19 December 1978, at New London, Connecticut but the transfer was cancelled on 3 February 1979. Whole project cancelled on 31 March 1979.
—	—	West Germany		Type 209 submarine	1,810 tons submerged	Six units were ordered to Howaldtswerke-Deutsche Werft in March 1978, with the first planned to be launched in April 1981 and all delivered by the end of 1983. Order cancelled in early 1979.
Destroyer (4)
IIS Kourosh IIS Dariush IIS Nader IIS Anoshirvan	11 12 13 14	United States		Kidd-class destroyer	9,783 tons full load	Six were ordered in 1974, IIS Shapour and IIS Ardeshir were canceled in June 1976, IIS Anoshirvan and IIS Nader in February 1979. The remaining two cancelled on 31 March 1979.
Frigate (12)
—	—	West Germany / Netherlands		NATO Standard Frigate	3,000 tons standard 3,800 tons full load	Twelve ordered in 1978, four to be built by Bremer Vulkan and the remaining at Holland, Rhine-Schelde-Verolme. Contract cancelled after the revolution.
