= IRIS Bayandor =

Corvette of the Islamic Republic of Iran Navy

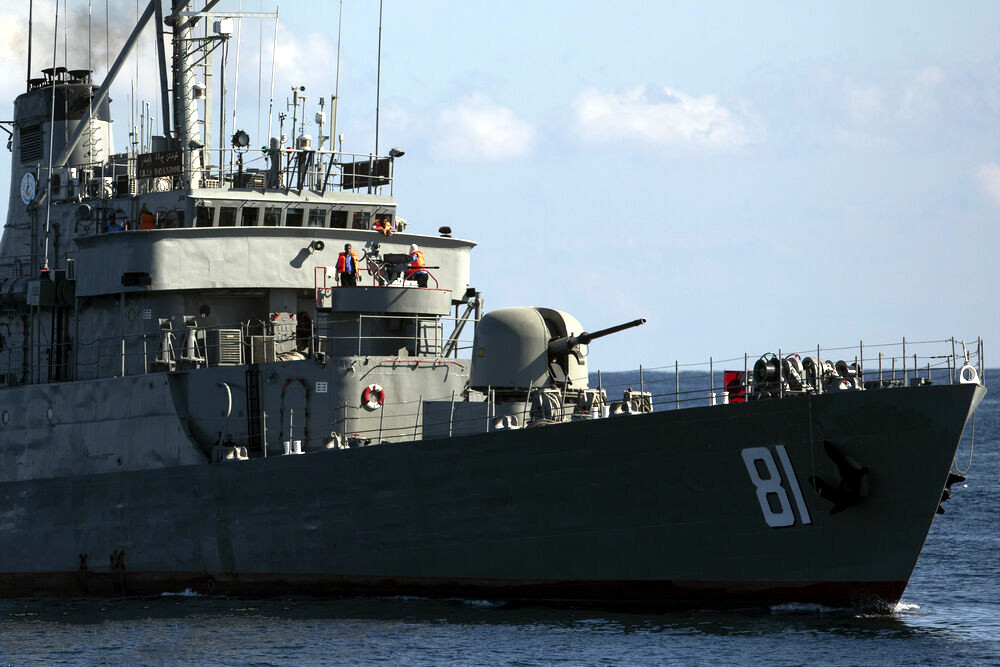
- Bayandor during a naval drill in 2019

History

Iran
- Name: Bayandor
- Namesake: Gholamali Bayandor
- Operator: Imperial Iranian Navy; Islamic Republic of Iran Navy
- Builder: Levingston Shipbuilding Company
- Laid down: 20 August 1962
- Launched: 7 July 1963
- Completed: 15 May 1964
- Commissioned: 18 May 1964
- Refit: 1970; 1978; 2011–2013
- Identification: Pennant number: 81; IMO number: 6125504; Code letters: EQAM
- Fate: Sunk during the 2026 Iran war

General characteristics (as built)
- Class & type: Bayandor-class corvette
- Displacement: 914 tons standard; 1,153 tons full load
- Length: 84 m (275 ft 7 in)
- Beam: 10.1 m (33 ft 2 in)
- Draft: 3.1 m (10 ft 2 in)
- Speed: 20 knots (37 km/h)
- Range: 2,400 nmi (4,000 km) at 18 knots (33 km/h); 4,800 nmi (9,000 km) at 12 knots (22 km/h)
- Complement: 140

IRIS Bayandor (Persian: بایندر) was a corvette of the Islamic Republic of Iran Navy named after Gholamali Bayandor, and the lead ship of her class. Launched in 1963 and commissioned into the Southern Fleet in 1964, Bayandor was transferred to Iran by the United States under the Mutual Assistance Program. She remained in Iranian service until her destruction by the United States during the 2026 Iran war.

== Construction and commissioning ==
Bayandor was built by the American shipyard Levingston Shipbuilding Company at Orange, Texas. She was laid down on 20 August 1962 and launched on 7 July 1963 on the Sabine River, being completed on 15 May 1964. Her commissioning took place three days later on 18 May 1964.

== Service history ==
Known port calls made by Bayandor during her service

In September 1964, Bayandor docked at Brooklyn Navy Yard for a three-day visit to New York City.

On 12 January 1968, Bayandor was dispatched to Greater Tunb, in response to British-encouraged flying of the Ras Al Khaimah flag at the island. While she was anchored about one mile east of the Tunbs, a Shackleton of the Royal Air Force spotted her. The British aircraft approached close to Bayandor, and subsequently was aimed by the ships' guns. Following the event, the British mission at Trucial States became prepared to deploy the Trucial Oman Scouts, however Bayandor was not in the area by 13 January.

Bayandor and her sister ship Naghdi arrived at Naval Base Guam on 10 April 1970 for an overhaul. On the way home, the two ships made port calls to Subie Bay, Singapore, Colombo, Sri Lanka and Cochin, India. An alleged dump of 50,000 gallons of fuel in the sea by the ships prior to the repair stirred a local controversy. The two undergone another major repair in the same base in 1978.

During Iran–Iraq War, Bayandor's home port was at Bushehr Naval Base, along with her three sister ships.

On 13 October 1996, American cruiser USS Gettysburg bumped into Bayandor in north of Persian Gulf, however neither of the ships suffered from a serious damage.

In the 11th deployment of Iran since 2009, Bayandor left home on 29 December 2010 for the Gulf of Aden, returning on 29 January 2011 after 31 days.

Starting in 2011, she underwent a major refit that was completed on 11 June 2013, during which a new 76mm Fajr-27 gun and Noor AShM launchers were installed. She was also fitted with a new fire control system, while its engines, heat exchangers, and fuel and oil systems had been overhauled. According to Anthony H. Cordesman, "weapons control, search/track radars, and sonars have not been fully modernized since the mid-1960s, although some aspects of the electronic warfare capabilities, communications, and battle management systems in the Bayandor seem to have been upgraded".

After the refit and trials, she was teamed up with the replenishment ship IRIS Bandar Abbas as the 31st naval group, for an anti-piracy operation also as far afield as Bab-el-Mandeb. The deployment took 120 days, lasting from 16 July to 13 November 2014. The two ships saved six merchant vessels from Somali pirates, including a Chinese container ship on 14 September 2014.

On 20 January 2016, the 38th naval group comprising Bayandor, the replenishment ship IRIS Bushehr and the landing ship IRIS Lavan, left home for a multi-purpose anti-piracy, flag, intelligence collection and training mission that included crossing the Bab-el-Mandeb for a voyage to the Red Sea, as well as crossing equator for a port call to Dar es Salaam, Tanzania on 1 March 2016. The ships navigated 7,600 nmi (14,100 km) in total and returned on 2 April 2016 after 73 days of sailing.

Along with her sister Naghdi and the amphibious ship IRIS Tonb of the 50th naval group, she docked at Colombo, Sri Lanka and Mumbai, India during another multi-purpose anti-piracy, flag and training mission. The deployment started on 30 January 2018 and ended on 17 March 2018.

As part of the 60th naval group with Lavan and Bushehr, between 20 January and 16 March 2019 she sailed 5,600 nmi (10,400 km) in the Arabian Sea for anti-piracy operations and then made another visit to Colombo. The three vessels also anchored at Muscat, Oman during the mission. In late February 2019, she participated in Velayat 97 wargame as an intelligence collector vessel. Bayandor made security patrols in the Arabian Sea and Gulf of Aden and between May and July 2019, navigating some 2,350 nmi (4,350 km) in the same formation of vessels, this time as the 62nd group.

Supported by the fleet replenishment oiler Kharg, she departed home on 30 January 2020 in a voyage to cross the Strait of Malacca. The two ships of the 66th naval group anchored at Port of Tanjung Priok between 25 and 28 February to commemorate the 70th anniversary of the Indonesia–Iran relations.

=== Sinking ===
Bayandor sank at her mooring at Konarak, Iran, on 28 February 2026, after strikes by United States forces. She was destroyed alongside her sister ship, Naghdi. Bayandor and Naghdi were targeted on the first day of the 2026 Iran war.

== See also ==
- List of Imperial Iranian Navy vessels in 1979
- List of current ships of the Islamic Republic of Iran Navy
