= USS Gettysburg (CG-64) =

Ticonderoga-class cruiser

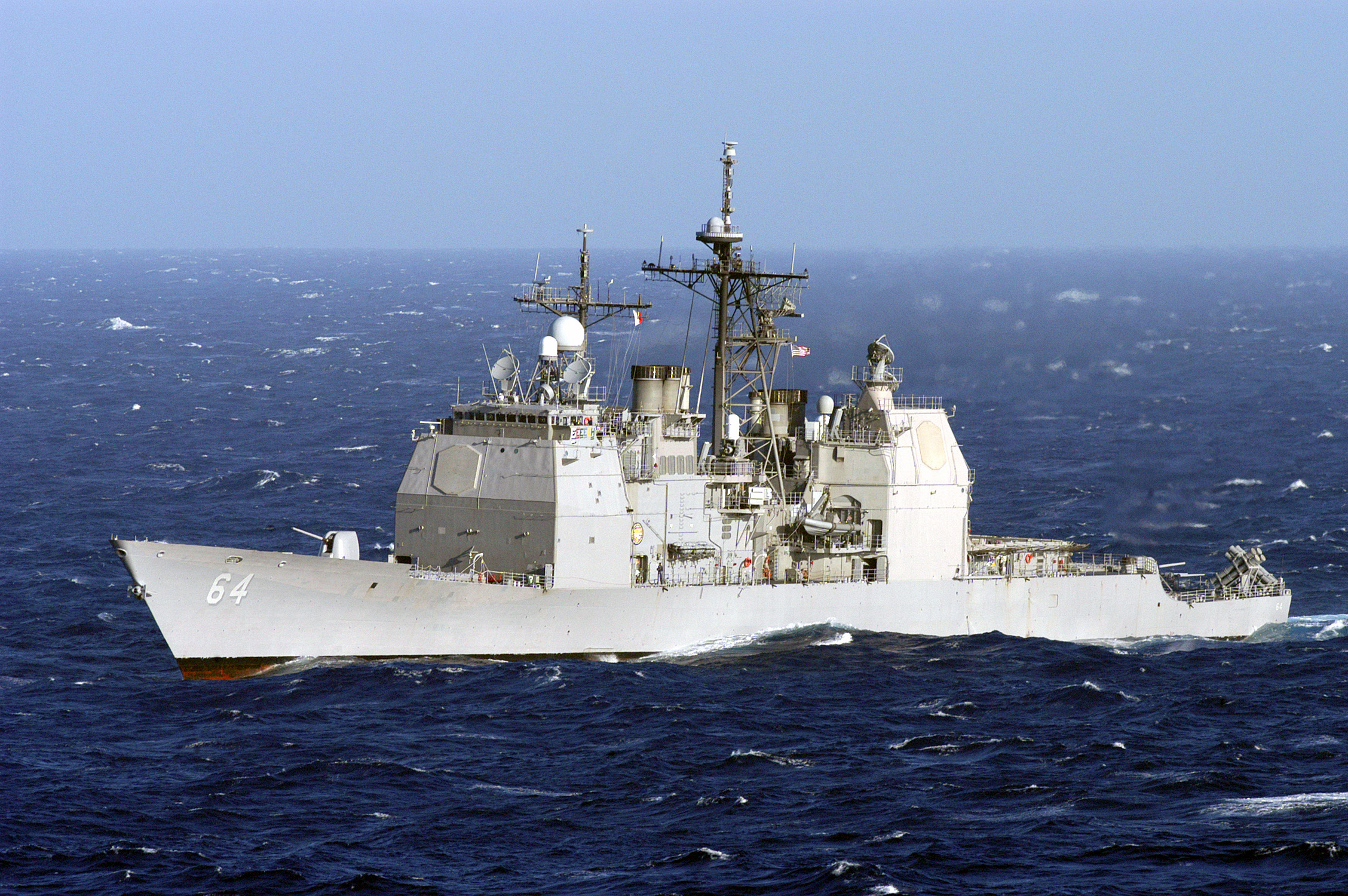
- USS Gettysburg (CG-64)

History

United States
- Name: Gettysburg
- Namesake: Battle of Gettysburg
- Ordered: 8 January 1986
- Builder: Bath Iron Works
- Laid down: 17 August 1988
- Launched: 22 July 1989
- Sponsored by: Julie Nixon Eisenhower
- Commissioned: 22 June 1991
- Home port: Norfolk
- Identification: MMSI number: 368879000; Call sign: NGTB; Hull number: CG-64
- Motto: Deeds Not Words
- Status: In Service
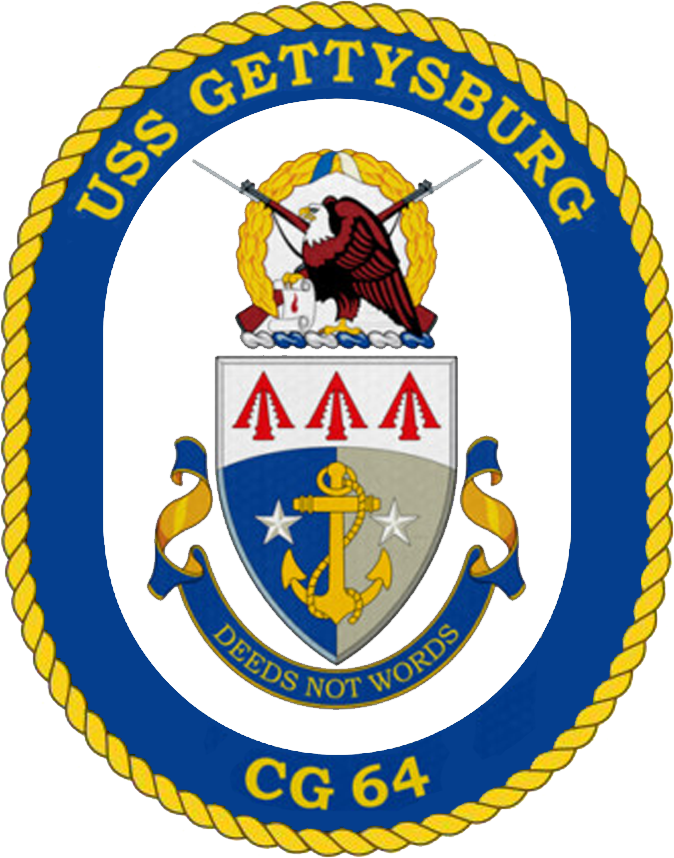
- Badge

General characteristics
- Class & type: Ticonderoga-class cruiser
- Displacement: Approx. 9,600 long tons (9,800 t) full load
- Length: 567 feet (173 m)
- Beam: 55 feet (16.8 meters)
- Draft: 34 feet (10.2 meters)
- Propulsion: 4 × General Electric LM2500 gas turbine engines; 2 × controllable-reversible pitch propellers; 2 × rudders
- Speed: 32.5 knots (60 km/h; 37.4 mph)
- Complement: 30 officers and 300 enlisted
- Sensors & processing systems: AN/SPY-1A/B multi-function radar; AN/SPS-49 air search radar (Removed on some ships); AN/SPG-62 fire control radar; AN/SPS-73 surface search radar; AN/SPQ-9 gun fire control radar; AN/SQQ-89(V)1/3 - A(V)15 Sonar suite, consisting of: AN/SQS-53B/C/D active sonar; AN/SQR-19 TACTAS, AN/SQR-19B ITASS, & MFTA passive sonar; AN/SQQ-28 light airborne multi-purpose system
- Armament: 2 × 61 cell Mk 41 vertical launch systems containing; 122 × mix of: RIM-66M-5 Standard SM-2MR Block IIIB; RIM-156A SM-2ER Block IV; RIM-161 SM-3; RIM-162A ESSM; RIM-174A Standard ERAM; BGM-109 Tomahawk; RUM-139A VL-ASROC; 8 × RGM-84 Harpoon missiles; 2 × 5 in (127 mm)/62 caliber Mark 45 Mod 4 lightweight gun; 2 × Mk 38 25 mm Machine Gun Systems; 2–4 × .50 in (12.7 mm) cal. machine gun; 2 × Phalanx CIWS Block 1B; 2 × Mk 32 12.75 in (324 mm) triple torpedo tubes
- Aircraft carried: 2 × MH-60R helicopters

USS Gettysburg (CG-64) is a Ticonderoga-class guided-missile cruiser in the United States Navy. She is named for the Battle of Gettysburg during the American Civil War.

== Construction ==
The third Gettysburg (CG-64) was laid down on 17 August 1988, at Bath, Maine, by Bath Iron Works; launched on 22 July 1989; sponsored by Julie Nixon Eisenhower, wife of Dwight D. Eisenhower II, grandson of former President Dwight D. Eisenhower and son-in-law of former President Richard M. Nixon; and commissioned on 22 June 1991.

== Operation history ==
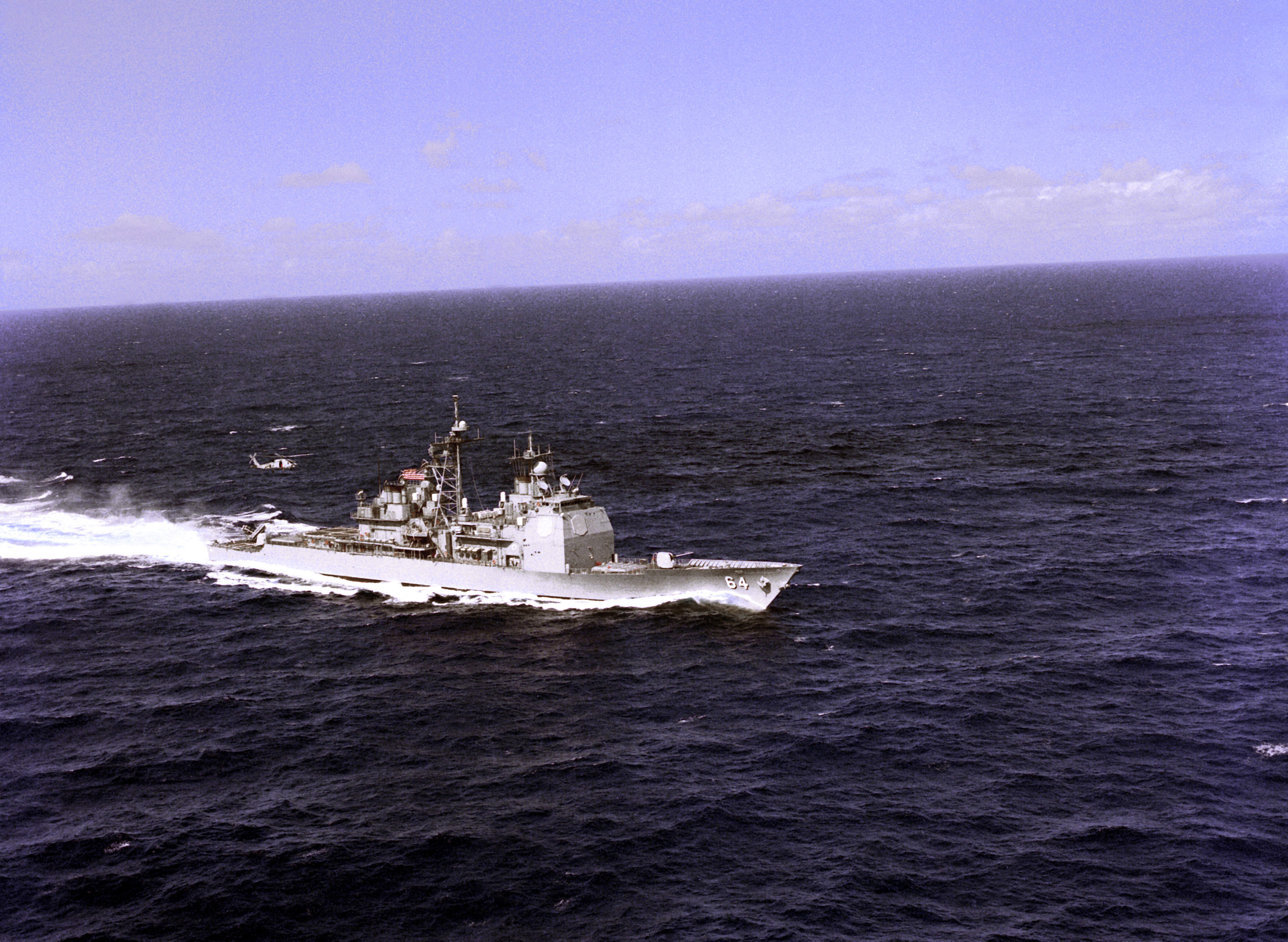
USS Gettysburg on her maiden voyage, 16 October 1992

October 1992 – April 1993, maiden deployment to the Mediterranean Sea in support of the USS John F. Kennedy (CV-67) carrier battle group; along with sister ship Leyte Gulf. On 30 November 1994, Gettysburg and guided missile frigate Halyburton were dispatched to assist the cruise ship Achille Lauro, which was on fire in the Indian Ocean off the coast of Somalia. Achille Lauro eventually sank but the passengers were rescued and transported to Djibouti, Djibouti.

On 13 October 1996, she bumped into Iranian corvette IRIS Bayandor (81) in the northern Persian Gulf; however, neither of the ships suffered serious damage.

Gettysburg took part in Operation Desert Fox, 16–20 December 1998.

In March 2003, the ship was assigned to Cruiser-Destroyer Group Twelve.

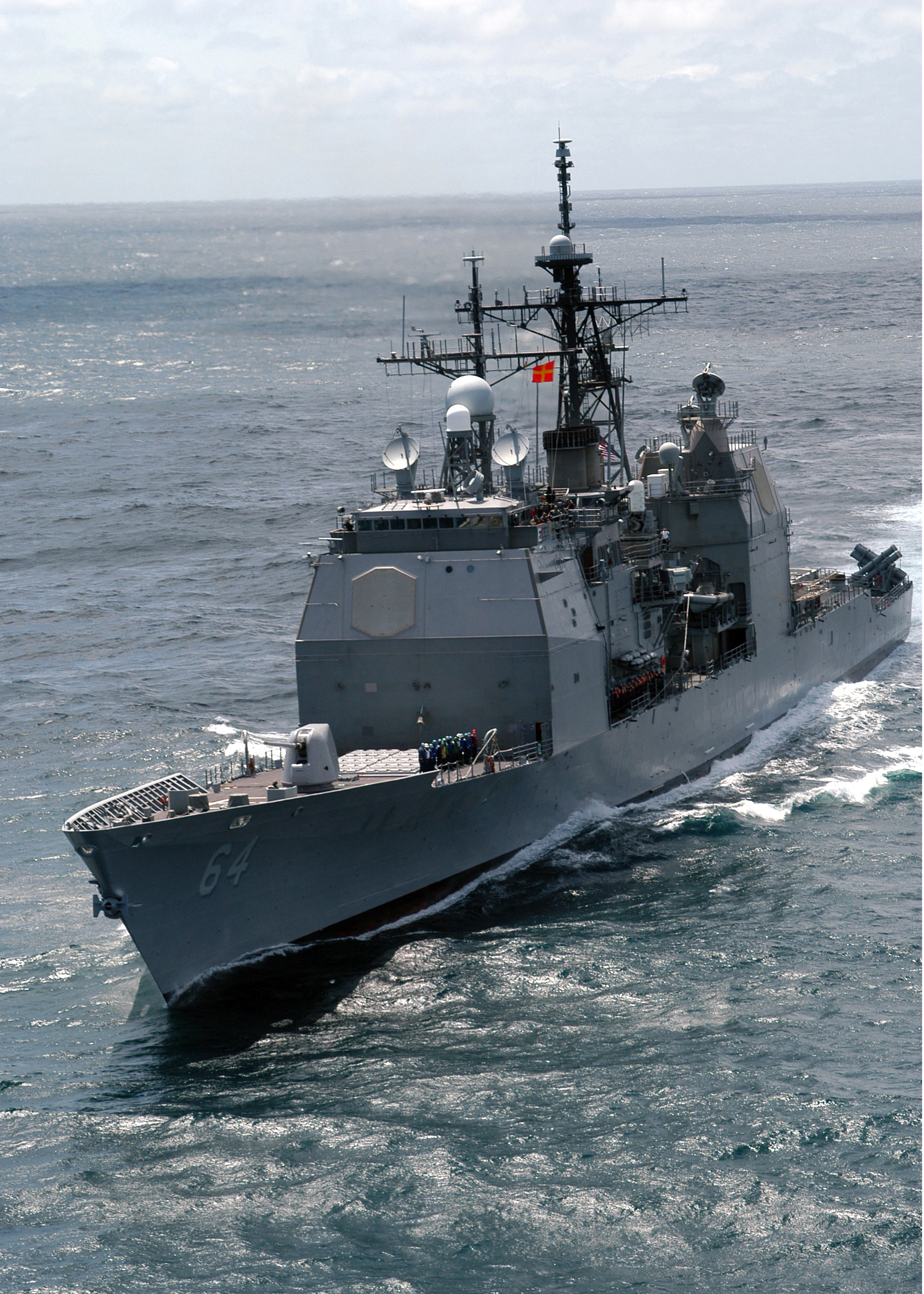
USS Gettysburg (CG 64) in 2004

Gettysburg with a Sikorsky SH-60B Seahawk of Helicopter Antisubmarine Squadron Light (HSL) 46 Detachment 5 and a Coast Guard law enforcement detachment (LEDET) embarked, sailed from Naval Station Mayport, on a two-part counter narcotics deployment to the Western Caribbean and Eastern Pacific, 11 October–23 December 2005 and 1 January–4 April 2006. She visited Curaçao, Netherlands Antilles, 21–25 October, passed through the Panama Canal, 3–4 November, and provided air surveillance and evacuation support for a visit by President George W. Bush to Panama. In addition, the ship visited Vasco Nunez de Balboa, Panama, 18–22 November and 5–6 and 16–18 December. Gettysburg intercepted three narcotics smuggling vessels, 14 metric tons (13.8 long tons; 15.4 short tons) of cocaine, and 17 smugglers before the New Year. She came about on 17 December, and intercepted her third suspect, a vessel carrying more than 11 metric tons (10.8 long tons; 12.1 short tons) of cocaine in the Eastern Pacific, on 22 December.

The ship, with HSL-46 Detachment 5 and Coast Guard LEDET 409 embarked, intercepted MV Perseus V on 12 January 2006. The boarding team discovered a hidden compartment containing 1.6 metric tons (1.6 long tons; 1.8 short tons) of cocaine and detained 11 suspected smugglers. The boarders then placed a custody crew on board, which delivered the boat to host nation authorities more than 500 miles (800 km) away four days later.

On 7 February Gettysburg, with LEDET 404 embarked, carried out a covert, nighttime surveillance and pre-dawn interception of fishing boat Divi, which analysts suspected of smuggling up to 15 metric tons (14.8 long tons; 16.5 short tons) of cocaine. The suspects sighted Gettysburg, set fire to their vessel, and abandoned ship in a skiff. The cruiser deployed 15 rounds of MK-86 into the “Divi” from a mile away and the ship sank. The boarders observed more than 150 bales of cocaine on the smuggler’s deck, but only retrieved less than 150 kilograms (330 lb). The Americans took the eight crewmen into custody.

Gettysburg patrolled an area about 1,750 nautical miles (3,240 km; 2,010 mi) west of the Galapagos Islands when a Lockheed P-3C Orion directed her to query fishing boat William, on 24 February 2006. The Orion aggressively monitored the suspected vessel, preventing her from rendezvousing with a go-fast. Gettysburg meanwhile launched Cutlass 467, her Seahawk, which guided the ship toward William, but the suspects attempted to scuttle their boat. Gettysburg's rescue and assistance teams and LEDET 404 saved William, enabling her boarding team to recover 4.9 metric tons (4.8 long tons; 5.4 short tons) of cocaine and apprehend the eight smugglers.

An Orion located a stealthy go-fast steaming westerly courses through a known drug-trafficking area on 11 March. Gettysburg closed and under cover of darkness, deployed LEDET 404 and a security team on board a RHIB, which boarded the suspected vessel, seizing 3.75 metric tons (3.7 long tons; 4.1 short tons) of cocaine, 8 kilograms (18 lb) of heroin, and detaining five smugglers. In addition, she sailed through the Panama Canal twice, 30–31 January and 15–16 March, and visited Cartagena, Colombia, 20–21 January, Vasco Nunez de Balboa, 16–19 February and 4-5 and 15–16 March, Curaçao, 23–26 March, and Port Everglades, Florida, 29 March-1 April. During this second voyage she seized or interdicted four suspected smuggling vessels and more than 25 metric tons (24.6 long tons; 27.6 short tons) of cocaine with a street value of $1.7 billion, detaining 34 suspected smugglers. Additionally, she issued return-to-port orders to two Colombian-flagged vessels capable of providing logistics support to narcotics traffickers. Working with other agencies and Orions during the two deployments, Gettysburg proved instrumental in the seizure of seven vessels, 45 smugglers, and 750 bales totaling more than 28 metric tons (27.6 long tons; 30.9 short tons) of cocaine and heroin valued at $1.95 billion.

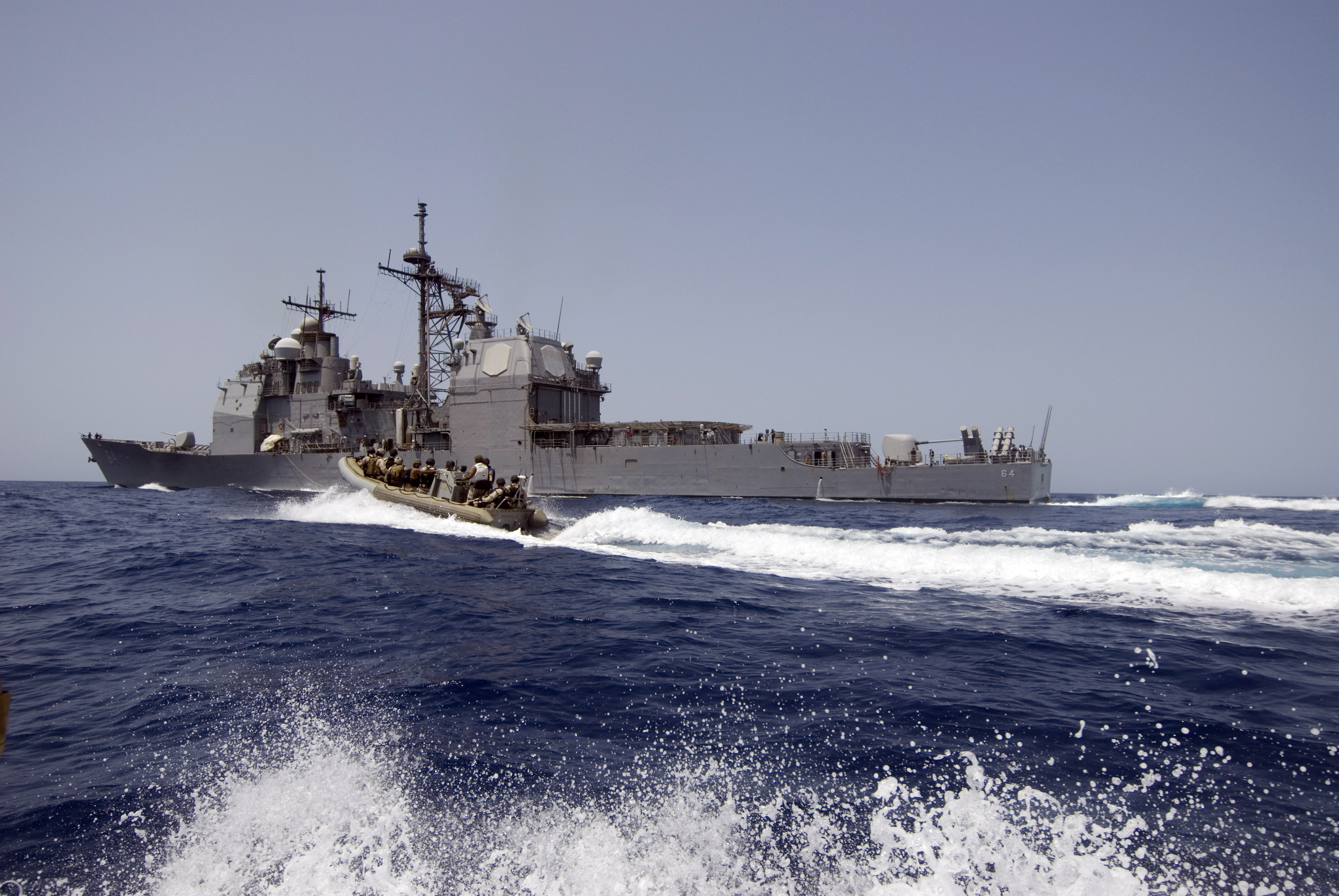
Visit, board, search and seizure team from USS Gettysburg, 2 June 2009.

Amphibious assault ship Boxer, which operated as the afloat staging base for Combined Task Force (CTF) 151, coordinated the apprehension of six pirates in the Gulf of Aden on 20 March 2009. A skiff containing the suspects pursued Philippine-flagged MV Bison Express, which sent a distress call. Gettysburg's embarked SH-60B from HSL-46 spotted the pirates throwing objects overboard, and a visit, board, search, and seizure team from the cruiser seized the suspects, who were then transferred to Boxer for questioning.

CTF-151, Turkish Rear Admiral Caner Bener, in command, defeated a pirate attack in the Gulf of Aden on 13 May 2009. Gettysburg and South Korean helicopter destroyer ROKS Munmu the Great (DDH-976) responded to a distress call from Egyptian-flagged MV Amira when pirates attacked her 75 nautical miles (139 km; 86 mi) south of Al Mukalla, Yemen. A Seahawk from HSL-46 Detachment 9, embarked on board Gettysburg, located a dhow suspected of serving as a "mother ship" for pirates. A visit, board, search, and seizure team and Coast Guard LEDET 409 from the cruiser discovered a variety of weapons on board the dhow and detained her 17 crewmembers. Gettysburg rescued another ship during her busy deployment when a Seahawk from the cruiser responded to Yemeni MV Alaseb and her 11 passengers, adrift in the Gulf of Aden on 26 May. The helo guided Gettysburg to the area, which towed Alaseb to a rendezvous with the Yemen Coast Guard for repairs.

The 13 May 2009, incident with MV Amira was filmed and featured on the Spike TV network special U.S. Navy: Pirate Hunters.

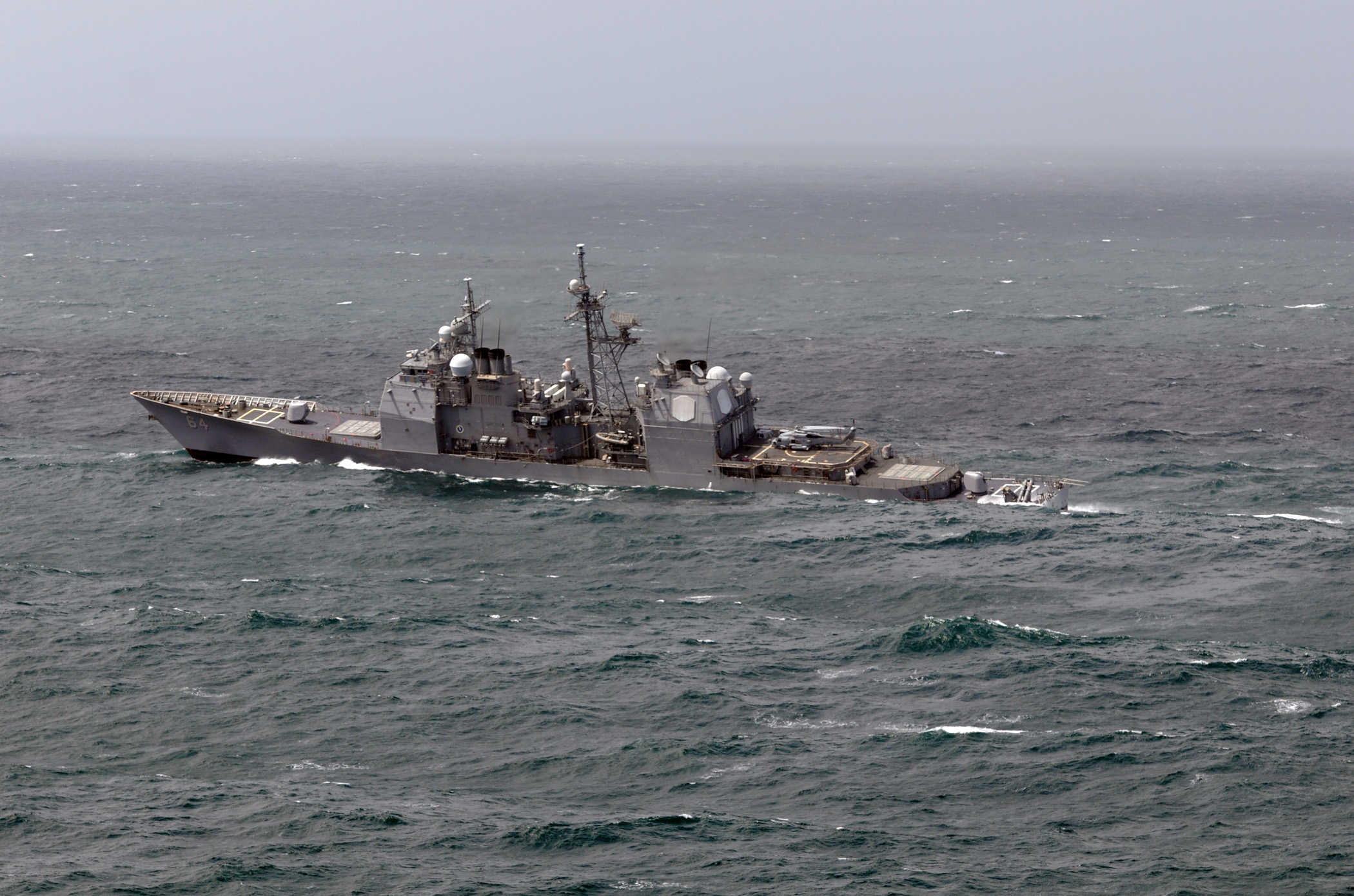
USS Gettysburg underway in high seas, 22 May 2011

Gettysburg completed her Composite Unit Training Exercise as part of Carrier Strike Group Two on 10 February 2011. Gettysburg deployed with an embarked Helicopter Maritime Strike Squadron 70 (HSM-70) detachment as part of Carrier Strike Group Two, departing Naval Station Mayport on 10 May 2011. Gettysburg subsequently participated in NATO naval exercise Exercise Saxon Warrior off the coast of England, under the operational control of Flag Officer Sea Training (FOST). During this exercise, Gettysburg operated with the new British guided-missile destroyer HMS Dauntless (D33).

In May 2015, Gettysburg's homeport was changed from NAVSTA Mayport to Naval Station Norfolk, Virginia.

Gettysburg entered into the Service Life Extension Program (SLEP) on 30 September 2015. She was drydocked and underwent extensive modernization and material repairs including an upgrade of her radar and AEGIS weapon system. She went underway again for the first time in nearly nine years on 28 February 2023.

Gettysburg was the first Ticonderoga-class cruiser to successfully navigate the SLEP program at an estimated cost of over $200 million.

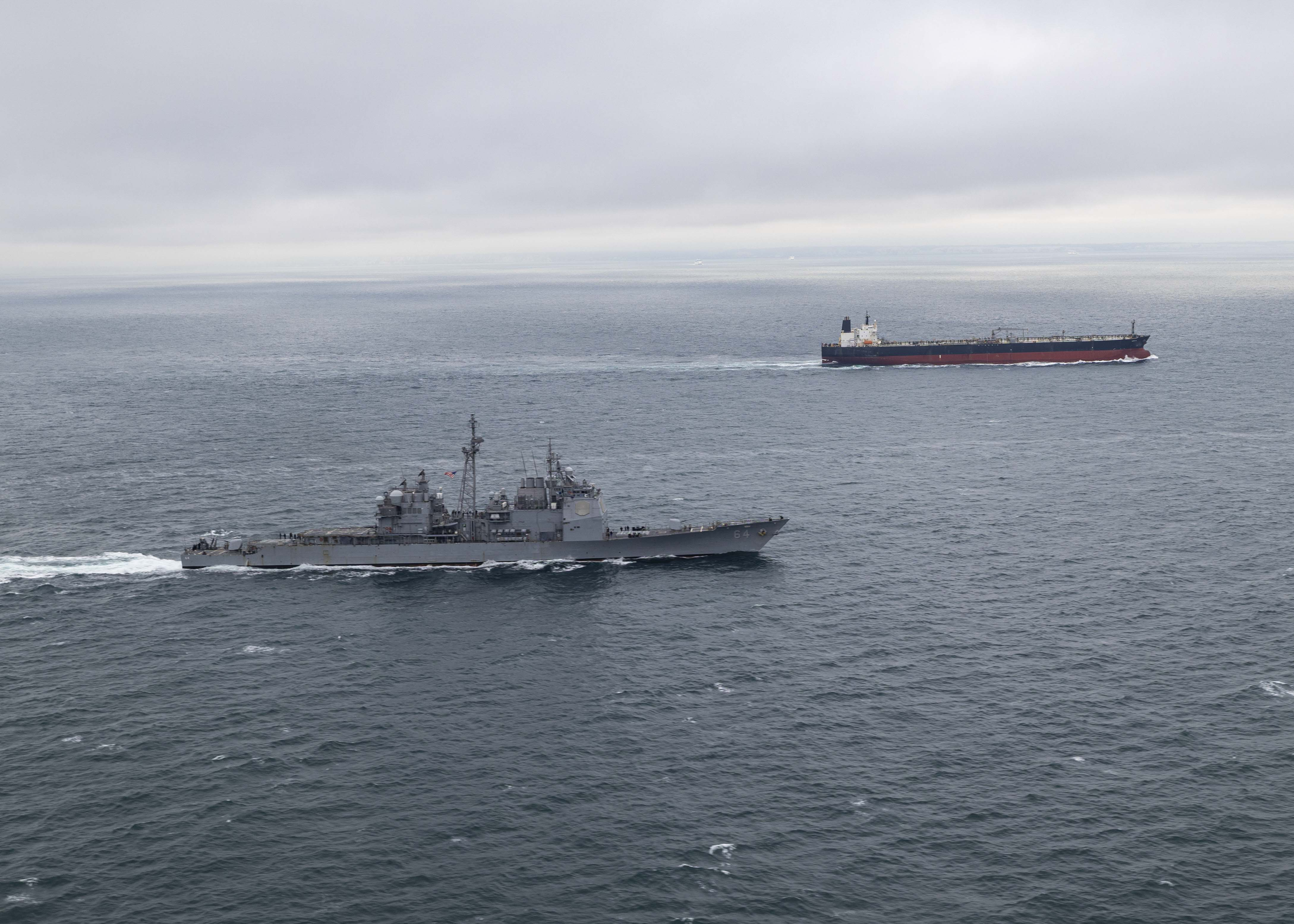
USS Gettysburg underway, 14 October 2024

On 23 September, 2024, Gettysburg departed Norfolk, VA in support of the deployment of Carrier Strike Group 8.

On 22 December 2024, Gettysburg shot down an F/A-18F Super Hornet belonging to Strike Fighter Squadron 11 (VFA-11) and flying off the USS Harry S. Truman (CVN-75) during the Red Sea crisis. USCENTCOM stated that both the pilot and weapon systems officer ejected and were recovered safely shortly after, with only one receiving minor injuries after an initial assessment. The Gettysburg also fired on a second F/A-18 and missed by ~100 feet. The missile missed thanks to the pilot performing evasive maneuvers.

== Awards ==
- Combat Action Ribbon (December 2023 – May 2025)
- Navy Unit Commendation
- Navy Meritorious Unit Commendation
- Battle "E" - (2013, 2014, 2023)
- Battenberg Cup – (2013)
- Kinsley Award from the Gettysburg Foundation - (2022)

== In popular culture ==
In Tom Clancy's novel The Bear and the Dragon, Gettysburg, with President Jack Ryan onboard, successfully defended Washington, D.C. against an incoming ICBM launched by the People's Republic of China using the Aegis missile system she carries.
