= IRIS Alborz =

Iranian Alvand-class frigate

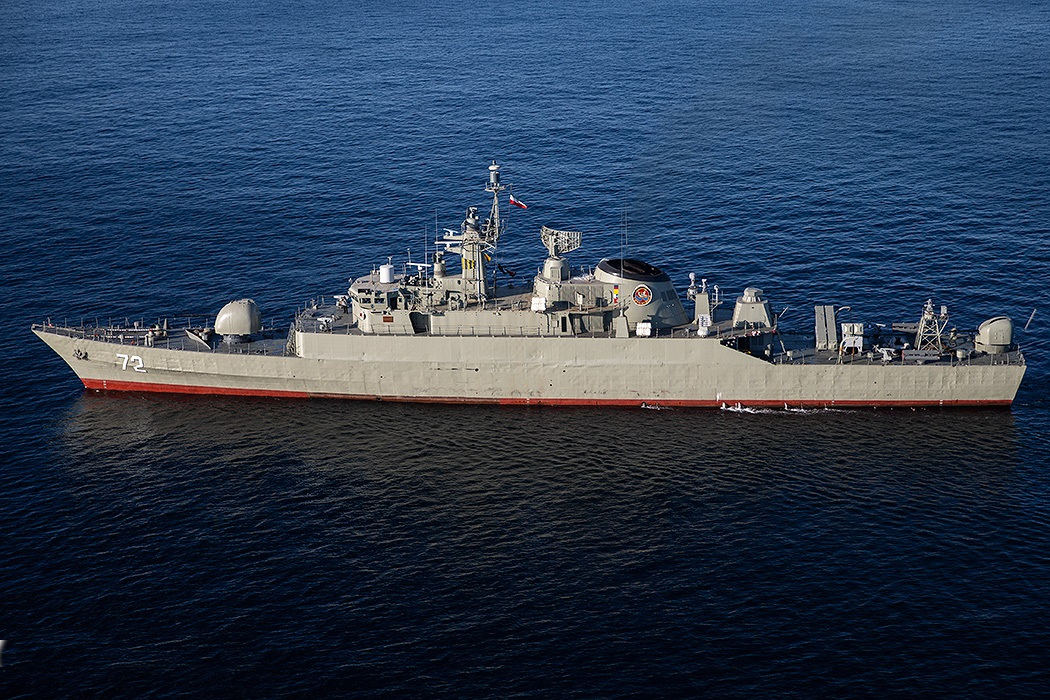
- Alborz in 2019

History

Iran
- Name: Zaal
- Namesake: Zaal
- Ordered: 1960
- Builder: Vickers, Barrow
- Yard number: 1080
- Laid down: 3 March 1968
- Launched: 4 March 1969; 57 years ago.
- Sponsored by: Abbas Aram
- Commissioned: 1 March 1971
- Renamed: Alborz, 1985
- Namesake: Alborz mountain range
- Home port: Bandar-Abbas
- Identification: Pennant number: 72; Code letters: EQAB
- Fate: Sunk on 12 May 2026
- Status: Sunk

General characteristics
- Class & type: Alvand-class frigate
- Displacement: 1,100 tons (1,540 tons full load)
- Length: 94.5 m (310 ft 0 in)
- Beam: 11.07 m (36 ft 4 in)
- Draught: 3.25 m (10 ft 8 in)
- Propulsion: 2 shafts, 2 Paxman Ventura cruising diesels, 3,800 bhp (2,800 kW); 2 Rolls-Royce Olympus TM2 boost gas turbines, 46,000 shp (34,000 kW)
- Speed: 39 knots (72 km/h) max
- Range: 5,000 nmi (9,000 km) at 15 knots (28 km/h)
- Complement: 125-146
- Armament: 8 × Noor anti-ship missiles; 1 × 4.5 inch (114 mm) Mark 8 gun; 1 × 30 mm Kamand CIWS; 1 x dual 35mm Oerlikon GDF; 2 x single 20 mm AAA; 2 × 81 mm mortars; 2 × 0.50 cal (12.7 mm) machine guns; 2 × triple 12.75 in torpedo tubes

IRIS Alborz (Persian: البرز) was an Alvand-class frigate, Vosper Mark V, of the Islamic Republic of Iran Navy. It was supplied to pre-revolutionary Iran's Imperial Iranian Navy by Great Britain. Launched in 1969, the frigate dates back to the Pahlavi era.

== History ==
=== 1968–1999 ===
Alborz is an Alvand-class frigate (based on the Vosper Mark 5 design) of the Islamic Republic of Iran Navy. It was supplied to pre-revolutionary Iran's Imperial Iranian Navy by the United Kingdom during the time of the Shah of Iran.

The ship was originally called Zaal, named after Zaal, a mythical warrior of ancient Iran and an important character in Ferdowsi's epic poem Shahnameh. After the 1979 Islamic Revolution it was renamed Alborz, after the Iranian Alborz mountain range.

Alborz was laid down on 3 March 1968, launched on 4 March 1969, and commissioned on 1 March 1971.

She completed her refit on 15 May 1977 at Portsmouth, England.

On 1 June 1987 Alborz stopped a Cypriot large bulk carrier Vevey, and searched it for possible war material for Iraq. Although this was within the Iranian captain's right to do so under international law, this became known as the first search-and-seizure of the Iran–Iraq War.

In 1988, during Operation Praying Mantis, an attack by the United States Armed Forces within Iranian territorial waters in retaliation for the Iranian naval mining of international waters in the Persian Gulf during the Iran–Iraq War and the subsequent damage to an American guided missile frigate, it saw little use as the Iranian Navy proved no match for the US Navy.

=== 2000–present ===
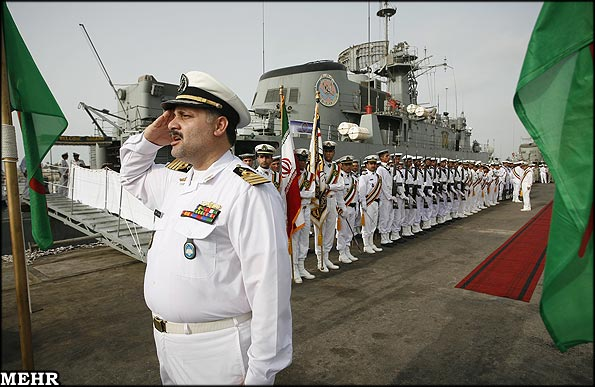
Alborz (2009)

In January 2010 the ship was sent to the Gulf of Aden, to protect Iranian maritime interests.

In April 2015, Alborz was deployed along with the supply vessel Bushehr (together, the Iranian Navy's 34th Fleet) to deliver arms shipments from Iran to the Houthis in Yemen, challenging a Saudi Arabian-Emirati blockade of Yemini ports from the delivery of such shipments. The US responded by sending the aircraft carrier USS Theodore Roosevelt to the Gulf of Aden, challenging the Iranian ships, which responded in turn by turning around and heading back to Iran.

Judging by photographs, it underwent another modernization during which the Iranian six-barrel 30 mm (1.2 in) Kamand anti-aircraft artillery system was installed on it with an opto-electronic system for detecting and tracking targets.

On 1 January 2024, Alborz—at this point 51 years old—deployed to the Red Sea after passing through the Bab-el-Mandeb strait. This happened against a backdrop of Yemen’s Iran-backed Houthis targeting vessels in the Red Sea for weeks, and a day after US Navy helicopters sank three Houthi-operated boats that had attacked a container ship in the Red Sea. Iran Defence Minister Mohammad-Reza Gharaei Ashtiani said "nobody can make a move in a region where we have predominance".

As of 12 May 2026, she was confirmed destroyed in a dry dock by the US Navy. She was the last active frigate in the Iranian Navy.

== See also ==
- List of Imperial Iranian Navy vessels in 1979
