= IRIS Alvand =

Frigate of the Islamic Republic of Iran Navy

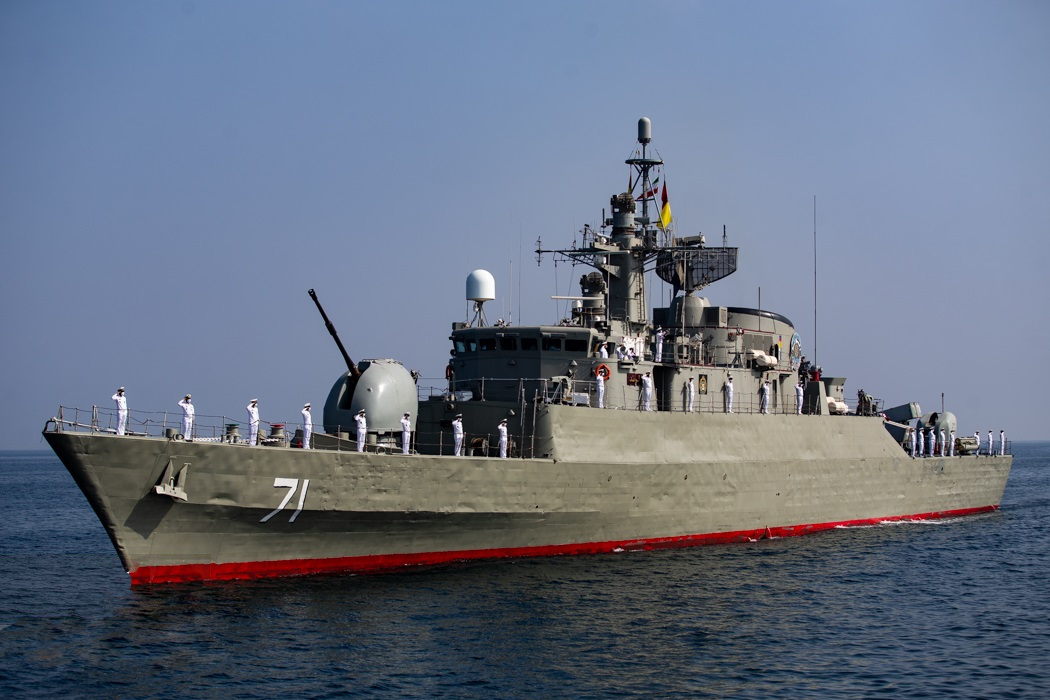
- IRIS Alvand during Zolfaghar 1400 exercise in 2021

History

Iran
- Name: Saam
- Namesake: Sām
- Operator: Imperial Iranian Navy; Islamic Republic of Iran Navy
- Ordered: 1960
- Builder: Vosper Thornycroft, Woolston
- Yard number: 1080
- Laid down: 3 March 1968
- Launched: 25 July 1968; 58 years ago.
- Sponsored by: Shahnaz Pahlavi
- Commissioned: May 1971
- Renamed: Alvand, 1985
- Namesake: Alvand mountain range
- Home port: Bandar-Abbas
- Identification: Pennant number: 71; Code letters: EQAA
- Fate: Sunk during 2026 Iran War

General characteristics
- Class & type: Alvand-class frigate
- Displacement: 1,100 tons (1,540 tons full load)
- Length: 94.5 m (310 ft 0 in)
- Beam: 11.07 m (36 ft 4 in)
- Draught: 3.25 m (10.7 ft)
- Propulsion: 2 shafts, 2 Paxman Ventura cruising diesels, 2,800 kW (3,800 bhp); 2 Rolls-Royce Olympus TM2 boost gas turbines, 34,000 kW (46,000 shp)
- Speed: 39 knots (72 km/h; 45 mph) max
- Range: 5,000 nautical miles (9,300 km; 5,800 mi) at 15 knots (28 km/h; 17 mph)
- Complement: 125-146
- Armament: 8 × C-802 anti-ship missiles; 1 × 4.5 inch (114 mm) Mark 8 gun; 1 × twin 35 mm AAA, 3 x single 20 mm AAA; 2 × 81 mm mortars; 2 × 0.50 cal (12.7 mm) machine guns; 1 × Limbo ASW mortar; 2 × triple 12.75 in torpedo tubes

Iranian frigate Alvand (Persian: الوند) was a frigate of the Islamic Republic of Iran Navy and the lead ship of her class. She was launched in 1968.

The ship was originally called Saam, lead ship of the Saam class (which is named after Sām, a mythical hero of ancient Persia, and an important character in the Shahnameh). After the Islamic Revolution the class was renamed to Alvand class, after the Alvand mountain-chain and so this ship, being the lead ship was renamed Alvand.

== History ==
Her delivery was delayed because the weapon control system was not prepared on time.

She completed her refit on 15 May 1977 at Portsmouth.

It joined the Indian Navy's 'Bridges of Friendship', held in Bombay on 17 February 2001 to celebrate India's 50th anniversary as republic where in 60 Indian vessels and 24 foreign vessels (including Alvand) participated. Alvand appeared to be in good state despite being thirty years old. In 2010 it participated in the 60th anniversary of the Sri Lanka Navy.

Alvand entered the Suez Canal on 22 February 2011, with the supply vessel Kharg, on a deployment reported to be a training mission to Latakia, Syria. In October 2016, Alvand and Buseshr were deployed to the Gulf of Aden, off Yemen. The ship was modernized in 2021.

During the 2026 Iran War, she was sunk by US airstrikes in Bandar Abbas.

== See also ==
- List of Imperial Iranian Navy vessels in 1979
- List of current ships of the Islamic Republic of Iran Navy
