= IRIS Naghdi =

1963 Bayandor-class corvette of the Islamic Republic of Iran Navy

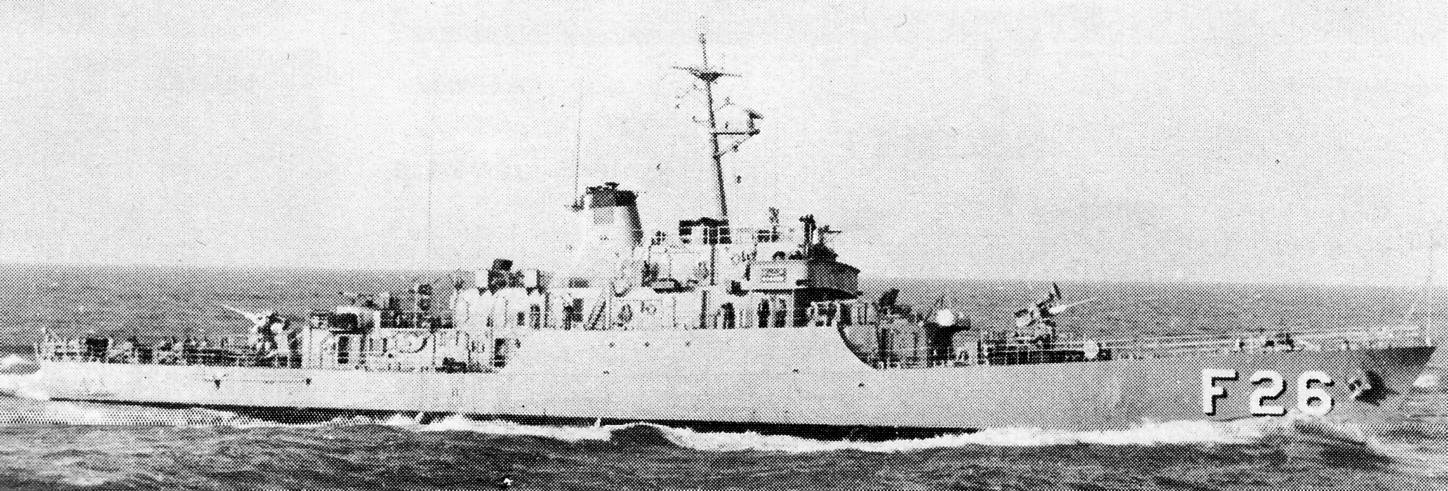
- Naghdi c. 1969

History

Iran
- Name: Naghdi
- Namesake: LtCdr. Nasrollah Naghdi
- Operator: Imperial Iranian Navy; Islamic Republic of Iran Navy
- Builder: Levingston Shipbuilding Company
- Laid down: 12 September 1962
- Launched: 10 October 1963
- Commissioned: 22 July 1964
- Refit: 1970, 1978, 1988, 2009
- Identification: Pennant number: 82; IMO number: 6125569; Code letters: EQAN
- Fate: Sunk during the 2026 Iran war

General characteristics (as built)
- Class & type: Bayandor-class corvette
- Displacement: 914 tons standard; 1,153 tons full load
- Length: 84 m (276 ft)
- Beam: 10.1 m (33 ft)
- Draft: 3.1 m (10 ft)
- Speed: 20 knots (37 km/h)
- Range: 2,400 nmi (4,000 km) at 18 knots (33 km/h); 4,800 nmi (9,000 km) at 12 knots (22 km/h)
- Complement: 140

Naghdi (Persian: نقدی) was a Bayandor-class corvette of the Islamic Republic of Iran Navy, serving in the Southern Fleet. Launched in 1963 and commissioned into the fleet in 1964, Naghdi was transferred to Iran by the United States under the Mutual Assistance Program. She was destroyed alongside her sister ship, IRIS Bayandor, during the 2026 Iran war.

== Service history ==
Naghdi and her sister ship Bayandor arrived at Naval Base Guam on 10 April 1970 for an overhaul. On the way home, the two ships made port calls to Subic Bay, Singapore, Colombo, Sri Lanka and Cochin, India. An alleged dump of 50,000 gallons of fuel in the sea by the ships prior to the repair stirred local controversy. The two underwent another major repair at the same base in 1978.

During the Iran–Iraq War, Naghdi's home port was in Bushehr Naval Base, along with her three sister ships.

Naghdi, her sister Bayandor and the amphibious ship Tonb decked at Colombo, Sri Lanka and Mumbai, India during a multi-purpose anti-piracy, flag and training mission that started on 30 January 2018 and ended on 17 March 2018.

In January 2026, Nagdhi took part in the BRICS "Will for Peace" joint naval exercise at Simon's Town, South Africa, apparently violating an instruction from South African President Cyril Ramaphosa that Iran should not participate in the exercise.

== Sinking ==
Naghdi was sunk in strikes by United States forces on 28 February 2026, the opening day of hostilities in the 2026 Iran War. She was destroyed at her mooring at Konarak, Iran, alongside her sister ship, Bayandor.

== See also ==
- List of Imperial Iranian Navy vessels in 1979
- List of current ships of the Islamic Republic of Iran Navy
