= Gholamali Bayandor =

Iranian admiral (1898–1941)

Timsar Gholamali Bayandor
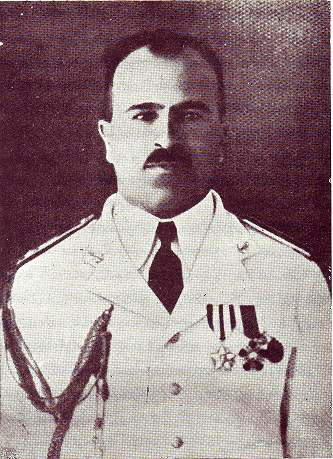
- Born: 13 December 1898; Tehran, Sublime State of Iran
- Died: 25 August 1941 (aged 42); Khorramshahr, Imperial State of Iran
- Burial place: Khorramshahr Naval Base
- Education: Accademia Navale; École Militaire; École d'artillerie de Poitiers; Fontainebleau
- Relatives: Darioush Bayandor
- Military career
- Allegiance: Qajar Iran (1920–1925); Pahlavi Iran (1925–1941)
- Branch: Imperial Iranian Navy
- Service years: 1920–1941
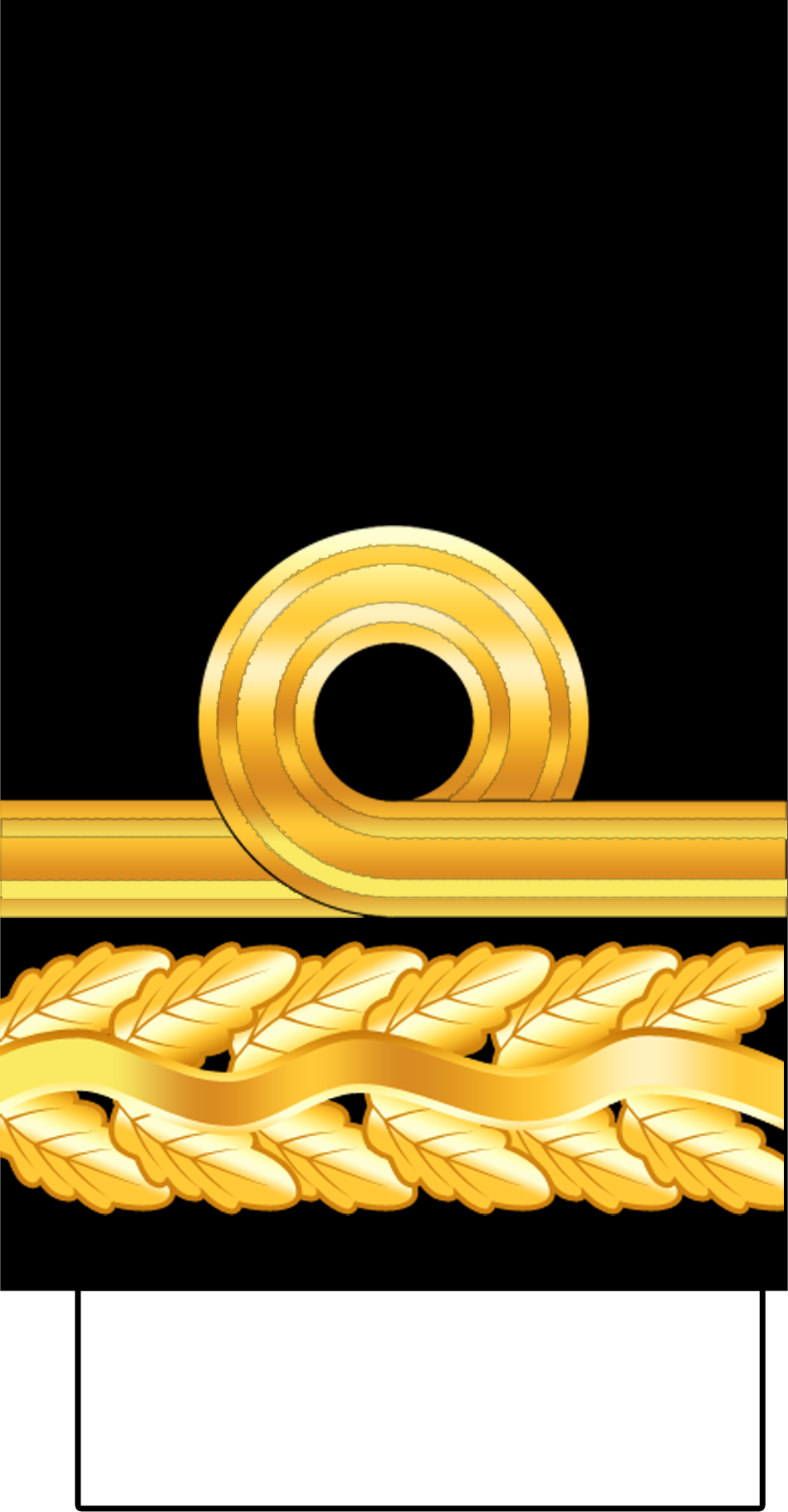
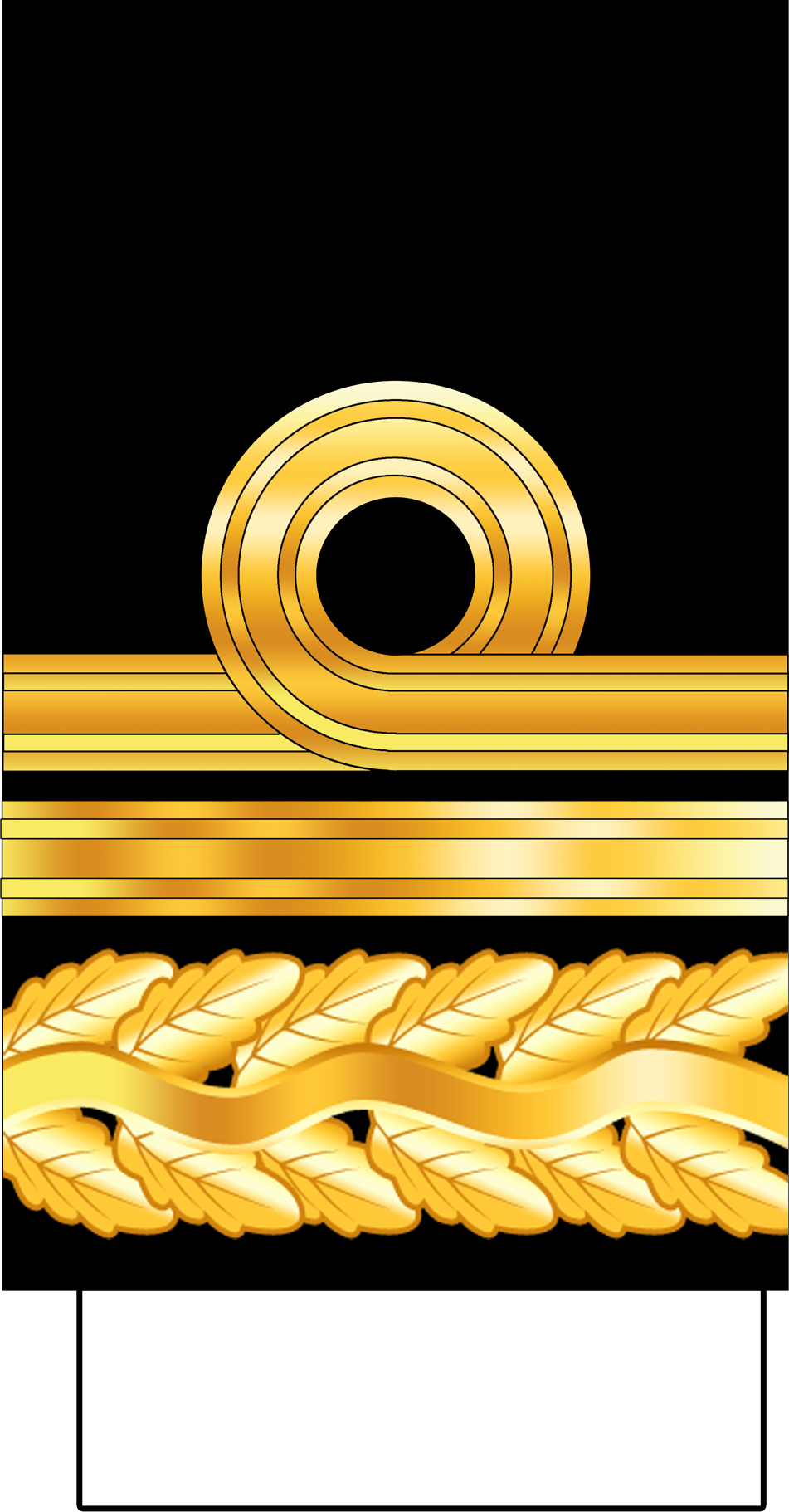
- Rank: Commodore; Rear Admiral (posthumously)
- Commands: Imperial Iranian Navy (1932–1941)
- Conflicts: Simko Shikak revolt; Battle of Shekar Yazi; World War II; Anglo-Soviet invasion of Iran †
- Awards: Order of Zolfaghar

Gholamali Bayandor (Persian: غلامعلی بایندر; 13 December 1898 – 25 August 1941) was an Iranian naval officer and the Commander of the Imperial Iranian Navy from 5 November 1932 to 25 August 1941. He was killed in action during the Anglo-Soviet invasion of Iran.

Born in Tehran to ancestors from the Bayandur tribe, he personally led his men in defending Iranian coasts at Khorramshahr and was killed in action fighting against Allied forces, dying a "gallant death". Commodore Cosmo Graham, who served as the Royal Navy's Senior Naval Officer, Persian Gulf, wrote that Bayandor's "death was regretted by all who knew him. He was intelligent, able, and faithful to Persia".

== Life ==
Gholam-Ali Bayandor was the second son of Ali-Akbar Bayandor and was born on 13 December 1898 in Tehran. His father, known by the title Dabir-e Darbar ("Court Secretary"), was one of the leaders of the Bayandor tribe of Gurus (Bijar).

Bayandor's grandfather, Lotf-Ali Khan, had four sons: Ali-Ashraf Khan, also known as Amir Mo'azzaz-e Gurusi; Ali-Akbar Khan; Qasem Sultan; and Fath-Ali Khan. Ali-Akbar Bayandor, in turn, had four sons: Gholam-Ali, Gholam-Hossein, Nasrollah, and Yadollah Bayandor.

== Education ==
Gholam-Ali Bayandor completed his secondary education at Dar al-Fonun in Tehran. In 1920, he graduated from the Moshir al-Dowleh Military School with the rank of Second Lieutenant.

Bayandor subsequently completed military studies at the Moshir al-Dowleh Military School, the Poitiers Military School, the Fontainebleau Military School, the Saint-Cyr Military School (Paris War College), and with the Italian Navy.

== Career ==
In 1922, Bayandor participated in military operations against Simko Shikak. In 1925, for his bravery and sacrifices during the Battle of Shekar Yazi, he was awarded the Order of Zolfaghar, at the time the highest military decoration in Iran.

In 1926, he was awarded the 3rd Class Order of Sepah, and in 1931 he received the Order of the Crown of Italy from the Italian government.

In 1936, Bayandor became commander of the Imperial Iranian Navy.

== Statements regarding Greater Tunb Island ==
Following the failure of negotiations between Iran and Britain concerning the recovery of the three Iranian islands, Iranian government and military officials visited the Tunb Islands in 1933 and 1934.

During these visits, Rear Admiral Bayandor, then commander of the Iranian Navy, spoke with residents of the islands and stated to British military officials that Greater Tunb, Lesser Tunb, and Abu Musa were part of Iranian territory.

== September 1941 crisis ==
On 25 August 1941, Rear Admiral Gholam-Ali Bayandor, commander of the Southern Naval Force, encountered gunfire from a British naval vessel while returning from Abadan. Several Iranian gunboats were caught by surprise and sunk, while a number of officers and sailors were killed.

Bayandor, accompanied by Captain Vali Mokri-Nejad, set out toward Khorramshahr to reach the headquarters of the Southern Naval Force and organize a response and prepare the forces for action. Before they could reach Khorramshahr, however, they were killed by sudden fire from British machine guns.

== Legacy ==
The Iranian corvette Bayandor, commissioned into service in 1964, was named after him.

== Books ==
Bayandor authored several works, including The Persian Gulf, published in 1938, and Geography of the Persian Gulf, published in 1940.

== Television series ==
Bayandor was portrayed as a character in the television series In the Eye of the Wind (Dar Cheshm-e Bad), directed by Masoud Jafari Jozani and produced by Sima Film. The series was produced beginning in 2003, with Akbar Ghadami portraying Bayandor.
