= Bayandur, Armenia =

Village in Shirak, Armenia

Bayandur Բայանդուր
- Location within Armenia Location within Shirak
- Coordinates: 40°42′03″N 43°46′23″E
- Country: Armenia
- Province: Shirak
- Municipality: Akhuryan
- Elevation: 1,480 m (4,860 ft)

Population (2011)
  - Total: 634
- Time zone: UTC+4

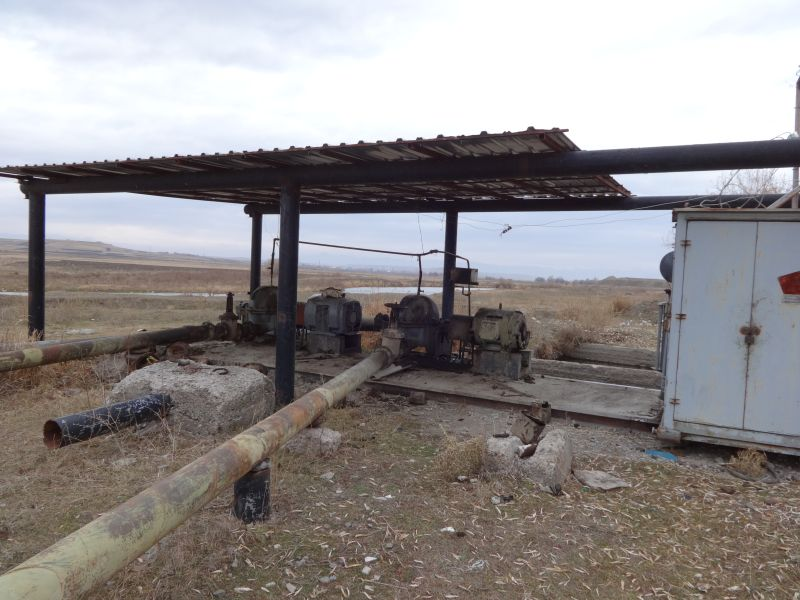
Bayandur 2 Pumping station.

Bayandur (Armenian: Բայանդուր) is a village in the Akhuryan Municipality of the Shirak Province of Armenia. The Statistical Committee of Armenia reported its population was 690 in 2010, down from 711 at the 2001 census.

== Demographics ==
Historical population
Year	Pop.	±% p.a.
1831	176	—
1897	966	+2.61%
1926	626	−1.48%
1939	659	+0.40%
1959	567	−0.75%
1970	589	+0.35%
1979	586	−0.06%
1989	732	+2.25%
2001	711	−0.24%
2011	634	−1.14%
