= Bayandor-class corvette =

Iranian patrol frigate

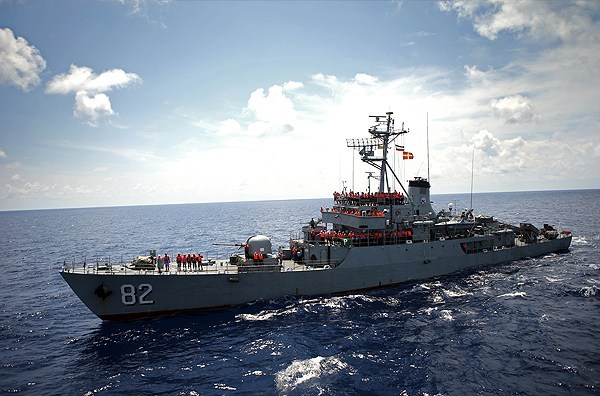
- IRIS Naghdi

Class overview
- Name: Bayandor class
- Builders: Levingston Shipbuilding, Texas
- Operators: Islamic Republic of Iran Navy
- Built: 1962–1964; 1967–1969
- In service: 1964–2026
- Completed: 4
- Lost: 4

General characteristics
- Type: Corvette
- Displacement: 900 tons (1135 tons full load)
- Length: 84 m (276 ft)
- Beam: 10.1 m (33 ft)
- Draught: 3.1 m (10 ft)
- Propulsion: 2 Fairbanks-Morse 38TD8 diesels on 2 shafts
- Speed: 20 knots (37 km/h) on diesels
- Range: 2,500 nmi (5,000 km)
- Complement: 140
- Armament: 4 × C-802 anti-ship cruise missiles; 1 × 76/62 mm Fajr-27 dual purpose naval gun; 1 × twin 40/56 mm AAA; 2 × single 20 mm AAA; 2 × 0.50cal machine guns; 2 x triple light torpedo launchers

The Bayandor class comprised four Iranian patrol frigates originally built for the US Navy as the PF-103 class. The class was named after Gholamali Bayandor. Two ships of the class were sunk during the Iran-Iraq War in 1980, while the remaining two ships were destroyed in the 2026 Iran war.

These corvettes were built in Texas under the MAP (Mutual Assistance Program), wherein ships were built from US Navy funding and transferred immediately upon completion to allied navies. Two half-sisters serve in the Royal Thai navy.

As delivered, they were equipped with depth charge racks and Mk6 K-Guns aft; and a Mk10 Hedgehog forward. These were removed during the Iran-Iraq War. A ZU-23 anti-aircraft gun was added in 1982; this in turn was replaced by an Oerlikon 20 mm gun in 1990.

On 11 June 2013, after a 20-month refit and overhaul Iran's navy launched the corvette Bayandor, the program included repairing of the main engines, overhaul of the heat converters and fuel systems, modernizing of the monitoring systems and installation of new FCS and radar, and adding a Fajr-27 76 mm dual purpose Oto Melara type rapid fire cannon, and a dual 40 mm anti-aircraft cannon, in addition to two double canister Noor anti-ship missile launchers.

== Ships in the class ==
Ship	Pennant number	Laid down	Launched	Completed	Status
Bayandor	81 (ex-F-25, ex-PF 103)	20 August 1962	7 July 1963	15 May 1964	War loss
Naghdi	82 (ex-F 26, ex-PF 104)	12 September 1962	10 October 1963	22 July 1964	War loss
Milanian	83 (ex-F 27, ex-PF 105)	1 May 1967	4 January 1968	13 February 1969	War loss
Kahnamoie	84 (ex-F 28, ex-PF 106)	12 June 1967	4 April 1968	13 February 1969	War loss

== See also ==
- Tapi-class corvette, sister vessels in service of Royal Thai Navy
- Pattimura-class corvette, similar vessels in service of Indonesian Navy
