= Mutual Assistance Program =

Mutual Assistance Program is a generic term denoting any form of international—and, in the United States, between states—cooperation projects, treaties, or joint ventures related to a specific issue, both civilian or military on, for example, health, culture, global or local security, or emergency services. It can also achieve the form of a community/professional fund or mutual-aid association at the local level.

== Civilian mutual assistance programs ==
- California Mutual Assistance Program:

Established as a global state-level emergency response for fighting huge forest/bush wildfires as a result of the Santa Monica Mountains in the early 1990s

- EU Schengen Agreement:

== Military mutual assistance programs ==
- Mutual Defense Assistance Act and the U.S. MAPs
- New Zealand MAP :

The program was originally created to provide training assistance to Tonga, Singapore, and Malaysia. It has since been expanded and now also includes assistance to the Philippines, Thailand, Brunei, Papua New Guinea, Western Samoa, Timor-Leste, Cook Islands, Solomon Islands, Vanuatu and Niue. One-off MAP activities may also be undertaken in other South Pacific countries as required.

- U.S.- Japan Mutual Defense Assistance Agreement (signed March 8, 1954):

On September 8, 1951, the United States and Japan already signed the Mutual Security Treaty, which stationed U.S. troops on Japanese soil for the defense of Japan following the eruption of the Korean War. On March 8, 1954, both countries signed the Mutual Defense Assistance Agreement (activated on May 1, 1954), focusing on defense assistance. It allowed for the presence of U.S. armed forces in Japan for the purpose of peace and security while encouraging Japan to take on more responsibility for its own defense, rearming in a manner suited for defensive purposes

== See also ==
- Mutual aid
