= Indonesia–Iran relations =

- Indonesia: Iran

Diplomatic mission
- Indonesian Embassy, Tehran: Iranian Embassy, Jakarta

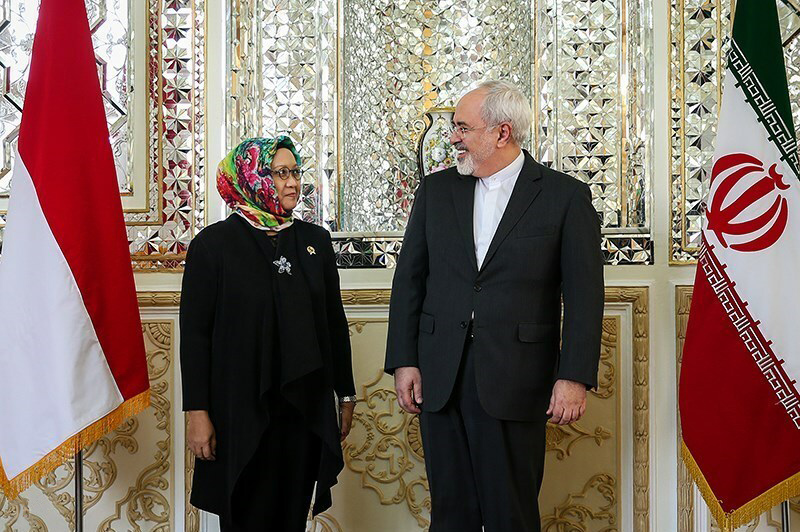
Iranian Foreign Minister Mohammad Javad Zarif and his Indonesian counterpart Retno Marsudi held a meeting in the Iranian capital of Tehran, 2016.

Indonesia and Iran established diplomatic relations in July 1950 when the highest Iranian authority welcomed an Indonesian envoy to begin diplomatic duties in Tehran. Indonesia has an embassy in Tehran, and Iran has an embassy in Jakarta. Both countries are full members of the World Trade Organization (WTO), The Non-Aligned Movement, Organisation of Islamic Cooperation (OIC), BRICS and Developing 8 Countries.

Relations between Indonesia and Iran are particularly important because both nations, as Muslim majority countries, are responsible for representing the Islamic world globally. Indonesia has the largest Sunni population in the world, while Iran is one of the few Shiite majority nations in the world. Relations between the two countries can also represent the harmonization and reconciliation between Sunnis and Shiites. As of 2025, the Indonesian Ambassador to Iran is Roy Soemirat, and the Iranian Ambassador to Indonesia is Mohammad Boroujerdi.

== History ==
=== Before Indonesian Independence ===
Numerous Arabic sources noted the existence of a people called Sayabiga, which are already settled on the shores of the Persian Gulf before the rise of Islam. This tribe or group appears to have been derived from a colony of Sumatran or Javanese people, originally settled in Sindh, but who were eventually made prisoners during a Persian invasion and forcibly enrolled in the Persian military forces. Sayabiga were mercenaries of high soldierly qualities, disciplined, used to the sea, faithful servants; and in consequence, they were considered eminently suitable to serve as guards and soldiers, gaolers, and wardens of the treasury. During the reign of Caliph Abu Bakr (r. 632–634) they formed a garrison at At-Khatt, in Al-Bahrain, and in 656 they are recorded as having been entrusted with the guarding of the treasury at Al-Basra. Ferrand (1926) shows that the name Sayabiga is derived directly from Sabag, which is a variation of Zabag.

Persian traders have been active in Indonesia since the Srivijaya period in the 8th century. It can be assumed that the contact between traders, mostly from Persia and the people of the Indonesia archipelago since the 7th century, resulted in a process of mutual influence in terms of the economic, social, cultural, religious, and especially language aspects between two society.

There is also an inscription of Persian poetry on the tomb of Fatimah bint Maimun in the village of Leran which dates from the 11th century during the era of Sultan Malik Saleh, the first Muslim ruler of Sumatra.

In the 13th century, many clerics from Persia who visited the kingdoms in the Indonesian archipelago brought Persian Islamic traditions and culture to Indonesia. One example is the art of calligraphy carved on Islamic tombstones in the Indonesia archipelago. There is also the Tabut (Tabot) culture in Bengkulu and Tabuik in West Sumatra which is similar to the Persian Ashura celebrations.

During the 16th and 17th centuries, Persians operated in the Aceh Sultanate. The Spanish exploler Melchor Davalos reported on the presence of Persians in Borneo and elsewhere in the late 1500s.

=== After Indonesian Independence and the Pahlavi Dynasty Period ===
During Pahlavi Iran, the Iranian envoy was present and participated in the 1955 Asia Africa Conference. President Suharto was the first Indonesian President to visit Iran and attend the 2,500-year celebration of the Persian Empire. The Shah of Iran became the first Iranian head of state to visit Indonesia on 1 October 1974. In June 1975, President Suharto returned to Iran to strengthen economic and political relations.

=== After the Islamic Revolution in Iran and in the New Order era in Indonesia until now ===
According to Riza Shibudi, a lecturer in international relations at the University of Indonesia, as quoted by the Republika daily, relations between Indonesia and Iran can be divided into three phases.

In the first phase (1979–1988), Indonesia attempted to "distance" itself from Iran. This was due to at least two factors. First, there was concern about the influence of the Iranian Islamic Revolution in Indonesia. It is undeniable that the Iranian revolution aroused admiration among some young Indonesians. At that time, for example, many Indonesian Muslim students' dormitories were decorated with posters of Ayatollah Khomeini. There was also strict "surveillance" of the Iranian embassy in Jakarta. Second, there was Indonesia's stance on the Iran–Iraq War and the Iran–Saudi Arabia conflict. As a neutral country in the Iran–Iraq war (1980–1988), Indonesia appeared to be trying to maintain its distance from both Iran and Iraq.

The Second Phase (1989–1991) was a transitional period in the political and economic relations between the two countries, during which positive changes began. Jakarta's shift in attitude toward Teheran during this phase was inextricably linked to political changes in Iran itself. The end of the Iran–Iraq War, the death of Ayatollah Khomeini, and the rise of "moderate" under Rafsanjani to the political stage, along with the gradual disappearance of the slogan "export the revolution," were factors influencing the trend of "moderate" in both domestic and foreign politics.

The improvement in Jakarta-Teheran relations was also marked by the increasing number of Indonesian officials and businessmen visiting Iran, and vice versa. In June 1990, at the invitation of Iranian Trade Minister Abolhossein Vahaji, the then Indonesian Trade Minister Arifin Siregar visited Iran. That same month, Iran's Presidential Advisor for International Affairs, Alireza Moayeri, also came to Jakarta to convey Rafsanjani's message to Suharto regarding the situation in the Persian Gulf, while also discussing improving bilateral relations. Moayeri also conveyed Rafsanjani's invitation to Suharto to visit Iran. The Head of State welcomed the invitation and promised to fulfill it at the appropriate time. Two months later (November 1990), Iranian Trade Minister Vahaji visited Jakarta, reciprocating the Indonesian Minister of Trade's visit to Iran. On that occasion, the two Trade Ministers agreed to extend the Memorandum of Understanding (MOU) on counter-trade. Meanwhile, in 1991, several Indonesian ministers visited Iran, including Foreign Minister Ali Alatas, Information Minister Harmoko, and Minister of Mutual Cooperation and Trade Sudrajat Djiwandono. Among the Iranian delegates to Jakarta were a parliamentary delegation (Majelis Syura Islami) who held talks with the leadership of the Indonesian House of Representatives (DPR RI). This culminated in Iran's support for Indonesia's candidacy for Chair of the Non-Aligned Movement (NAM).

The third phase, which began in (1992– present) marked a "new era" in Indonesia-Iran relations. This phase was marked by President Rafsanjani's visit to the 10th Non-Aligned Movement (NAM) Summit in Jakarta in September 1992. Rafsanjani also held a special meeting with President Suharto. Since then, visits by high-ranking Iranian officials to Indonesia, and vice versa, have become routine. President Suharto's visit to Iran, in addition to fulfilling President Rafsanjani's invitation and reciprocating the Iranian President's visit to Jakarta the previous year, also had significant significance for both Indonesia and Iran. First, for Indonesia, this visit could "neutralize" the controversy arising from Israeli Prime Minister Yitzhak Rabin's secret visit to Jakarta in 1993. As is well known, Iran is one of the countries that rejects any form of compromise with Israel.

The Iranian President also paid his second state visit to Indonesia in 1994. President Rafsanjani was scheduled to hold talks with President Suharto on bilateral, regional, and international issues of mutual interest. President Rafsanjani was also scheduled to visit the Indonesian aircraft manufacturing company, IPTN, in Bandung, the capital of West Java province, about 250 km southeast of Jakarta. This demonstrated Iran's interest in the development of the Indonesian aviation industry.

== Economic relations ==
In 2015, the trade value between Iran and Indonesia was only US$300 million, down from the trade value in 2011 which was US$1.8 billion. Therefore, the two heads of state agreed to take steps to increase trade figures.

The governments of the two countries also see promising potential in cooperation in the energy sector. In 2016, Pertamina and the National Iranian Oil Company (NIOC) have cooperated in supplying LPG amounting to 88,000 tons and the amount will continue to increase next years. This cooperation can be expanded to other sectors such as crude oil, refineries, petrochemical products and others in the future.

== Political relation ==
According to a 2013 BBC World Service Poll, Indonesians' perception of Iran is overwhelmingly positive, with 98% of Indonesians expressing a positive view. It is among the most favourable perception of Iran in Asia, and second-most favourable in the world.

During the 2019–2021 Persian Gulf crisis, Indonesia had seized Iranian and Panamanian tanker in Borneo. The two ships were suspected of illegally transferring oil in the waters.

== Science and technology cooperation ==
According to the official report of the Ministry of Research and Technology of the Republic of Indonesia, in the field of science and technology cooperation, Indonesia and Iran have signed an MoU in 2006 and formed a Joint Science and Technology Committee since 2008. In October 2017 the two met and produced several activity plans, namely:

- Formation of the Indonesian Iranian University Network for the Implementation of a Symposium with Indonesia and Iran, back to back
- The 6th meeting of the Committee on Indonesian Iran Science and Technology Working Group in Indonesia semester 1 of 2019.
- The implementation of the Mobility Program includes the participation of Indonesian researchers and stakeholders in the International Seminar forum.
- Regarding Indonesian promotional activities, the Indonesian Embassy actively participates in various exhibitions that showcase economic potential while synergistically introducing Indonesian culture.

== Cultural relations ==
In a cultural meeting called "Traces of the Persians in Southeast Asia" held at the Faculty of Languages and Cultures, University of Indonesia, topics such as similarities in Iranian and Indonesian languages and cultures were explored. Attended by Iran's cultural attaché in Indonesia, Hojatollah Ebrahimian, and Dean of the Faculty of Languages and Cultural Sciences Adrianus Lavranous, the meeting also aimed to increase cultural ties and understanding between the two Muslim countries.

Linguistic

Iran and Indonesia share a linguistic heritage, in fact the language spoken in Indonesia language has 350 Persian words as part of its lexicon. For example, the word Anggur in Indonesian comes from the Persian word انگور (angur) which means grapes. The word Kismis in Indonesian comes from the Persian word کشمش (kešmeš) which means raisins. The word Syahbandar in Indonesian means port ruler. Consisting of the word Bandar in Indonesian comes from the Persian word بندر (bandar) with the same meaning. And the word shah comes from the word شاه (šâh) which means King.
