= Darioush Bayandor =

Iranian writer and diplomat

Darioush Bayandor (Persian: داریوش بایندر) is a former Iranian diplomat and official who worked for the government of Shah Mohammad Reza Pahlavi. Following the Iranian Revolution, he left Iran to work for the United Nations in the 1980s and 1990s before retiring to Switzerland where he writes and consults.

== Diplomatic career ==
Born in Iran, Bayandor served as a senior diplomat of the Iranian government in New York City and Tehran in the 1960s and 1970s. During final years of the 1970s he served as Foreign-Affairs Adviser to prime ministers Amir Abbas Hoveyda, Jamshid Amouzegar and Jafar Sharif-Emami. In an interview with Norman Forer in 1977, Bayandor defended status of human rights in Pahlavi Iran and expressed his indignation with Amnesty International, calling its activities attempts to "vilify" and "interfere in internal affairs" of Iran. He added that all political prisoners in Iran had either committed or conspired to conduct violent acts, and argued that "when you have 40% illiteracy, you can't have democracy like in the United States".

After the Revolution in 1979, Bayandor briefly served as director of the regional bureau for the Americas in the foreign ministry before joining the United Nations High Commission for Refugees (UNHCR) in 1980 where he led several offices in Asia, Europe and Africa over a twenty-year period. His last assignment before retirement in 2000 was the Regional Representative for Central Africa and the UN Humanitarian Coordinator based in Democratic Republic of Congo during the wartime in late 1990s.

== Works published ==
As a UN delegate to France, Bayandor wrote an article in 1996 about the humanitarian crisis of war refugees. In 1999 he submitted an editorial opinion piece to the International Herald Tribune about war refugees in Africa.

Shifting to historic Persian poetry, In 2006 he published an essay about Iran's iconic fourteenth century poet Hafez, under the title, "Hafez: A Face-Off with Virtue". He contested the perennial orthodox narratives which accord a gnostic sense to the language of love and worldly pleasures by the poet, and project a theosophical interpretation to his outlook.

In 2010 Bayandor published his study on the fall of Iran's prime minister, Mohammad Mosaddegh, a fall which is widely attributed to the CIA. Titled, Iran and The CIA: The Fall of Mosaddeq Revisited, Palgrave-Macmillan, (ISBN 978-0-230-57927-9), the book argued that the failure of the Anglo-American coup plot, codenamed TP-Ajax, that brought at its wake the flight of the Shah Mohammad Reza Pahlavi to Baghdad, unleashed internal dynamics that culminated in a clergy-inspired uprising on 19 August. The event led to the downfall of Mosaddeq's government after the pro-shah army units joined the fray in the afternoon of that day. Bayandor dismissed as prevarication the claim by the CIA operative in Tehran Kermit Roosevelt to the effect that he had planned events of August 19 two nights earlier in a "Council of War" held at the American Embassy in Tehran.

Bayandor's narrative stirred controversy in academic circles, reflected in a special edition of Iranian Studies in September 2012. The brunt of criticism was on Bayandor's affirmation of the role played by the supreme quiescent Shia leader, Grand Ayatollah Seyyed Hossein Boroujerdi, deemed by others to be above the political fray. Homa Katouzian, a historian and political scientist, dismissed Bayandor's book as "political". Academics Fouad Ajami, Yann Richards, Shahram Chubin and Michael Axworthy praised the book as a valuable contribution to the literature. The book received mixed reviews in the media. The Economist, while pointing to the polemical character of the new narrative, considered the author's skepticism, "A useful antidote to Roosevelt's self-aggrandizing, which some later writers have mimicked uncritically". The Washington Times criticized the book stating that "a careful reading of Mr. Bayandor's book, along with the CIA history and Mr. Roosevelt's memoir, shows that there is a very thin element of truth in his revisionist theory". However, when in 2017 the CIA secret files of the episode were released by the US Department of State, several documents bore out Bayandor's contentions, notably regarding Boroujerdi's active role. Among these documents was a dispatch by Roosevelt to the CIA headquarters on the very morning of Mosaddeq's overthrow on 19 August which revealed that the CIA Station in Tehran had no knowledge of the events that were about to end Mosaddeq's rule.

In December 2018, Bayandor published a comprehensive history of the 1979 Revolution titled, The Shah, the Islamic Revolution and the United States, (Palgrave-Macmillan) (ISBN 978-3-319-96118-7). Portrayed as a multifaceted historical paradox, Bayandor delved into the roots of the revolution, highlighting cultural, demographic and historical factors that along with systemic flaws in the Shah authoritarian rule allowed incongruous socio-political forces to coalesce with the radical clergy to end the millennia-old monarchy in Iran. The role played by Carter administration has been examined in several chapters based on Department of State archives including new batches released by Wikileaks in 2017. Brookings Institution described the book. "A very worthy addition to an already copious literature on Iran". Similarly, the International Institute of Strategic Studies (IISS) praised it as, "An important and honest appraisal that adds to our understanding of how a formidable monarchy came crumbling down in 1979".

- Bayandor, Darioush (2019). The Shah, the Islamic Revolution and the United States. Oliver Arts & Open Press. p. 160. ISBN 978-3-319-96118-7.
- 1999 - Look Away From Kosovo to See the Crisis in Central Africa, International Herald Tribune

== Personal life ==
Bayandor was born in Iran to Mahmoud Bayandor, a General in the Imperial Iranian Army.

Bayandor has analyzed and adapted Iranian poetry into French and English. In 2006, for the Journal of Middle Eastern and African Intellectual and Cultural Studies, he wrote "Hafez: A Face-Off With Virtue" about the 14th century Iranian lyric poet, Hafez.
