= Naval history of Iran =

The Iranian Navy traditionally located in the shallow waters of the Persian Gulf, has always been the smallest of the country's military forces. An Iranian navy in one form or another has existed since Achaemenid times in 500 BC. The Phoenician navy played an important role in the military efforts of the Persians in late antiquity in protecting and expanding trade routes along the Persian Gulf and Indian Ocean. With the Pahlavi dynasty in the 20th century that Iran began to consider building a strong navy to project its strength into the Persian Gulf and Indian Ocean. In more recent years, the country has engaged in domestic ship building industries in response to the western-backed Iraqi invasion of Iran, which left it without suppliers during an invasion.

== Qajar dynasty (1885–1925) ==
The modern navy of Iran was born in 1885, when steamers Persepolis and Susa were commissioned into service in the Persian Gulf.

== Pahlavi dynasty (1925–1979) ==
Imperial Iranian Navy
- نیروی دریایی شاهنشاهی ایران (Persian)
- The seal of the Imperial Iranian Navy
- Founded: 5 November 1932
- Disbanded: 11 February 1979
- Country: Pahlavi Iran
- Type: Navy
- Role: Naval warfare
- Size: 22,000 (1979)
- Fleet: 3 destroyers; 4 frigates; 4 corvettes; 9 fast attack crafts
- Engagements: World War II; Anglo-Soviet invasion of Iran; Joint Operation Arvand; Seizure of Abu Musa and Tunbs; Dhofar rebellion; Second Iraqi–Kurdish War; 1974–1975 Shatt al-Arab conflict

Commanders
- Commander: See list

Insignia
- Ensign

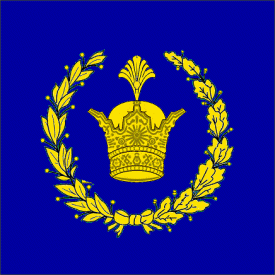
- Jack: 1926–1974 1974–1979

- Roundel

The Imperial Iranian Navy (IIN) was the navy of Pahlavi Iran, being founded on 5 November 1932 and disbanded on 11 February 1979 after the Iranian Revolution. By 1941, the IIN consisted of several sloops and patrol boats. During the Anglo-Soviet invasion of Iran in World War II, the IIN was attacked and quickly overwhelmed by Allied forces, with the IIN's commander Timsar Gholamali Bayandor being killed in action. As a result of offensive actions by the Royal Navy and the Royal Australian Navy, two sloops and two patrol boats of the IIN were destroyed, some of which were still moored at their home ports. Following World War II, the IIN began increasing its fleet strength by acquiring destroyers, frigates and numerous smaller vessels, including motorboats and hovercraft; many of these were made in either the United States or the United Kingdom. In the 1970s, the IIN planned to extend its naval reach into the Indian Ocean; but this goal was curtailed by the Iranian Revolution, and the ensuing Iran–Iraq War further weakened the IIN's capability to extend its reach.

IIN ships seized Abu Musa and the Greater and Lesser Tunbs on 30 November 1971 after British forces withdrew from the region. During this period, IIN established an aviation branch, acquiring aircraft from foreign sources, most of which were American. Just prior to the Iranian Revolution, the IIN also had purchase orders for more equipment from British and American manufacturers. In the 1970s, a Ol-class tanker was ordered from Swan Hunter. Named Kharg, she was constructed in 1977 but not delivered until 1984. Four modified Spruance-class destroyers were ordered from the United States, while eight modified Kortenaer-class frigates were ordered from Royal Schelde. The Iranian Revolution happened before any of the ships could be delivered, so, both orders were cancelled. The Kidd-class destroyers then went into service with the United States Navy and were later transferred to the Republic of China Navy, where they are still in service. By 1979, the IIN had three battalions of marines.

Acquisition of vessels by the Imperial Iranian Navy in Napoli, 1932.

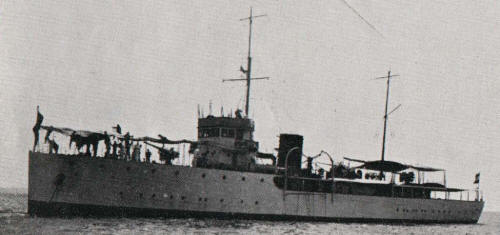
The Iranian warship Babr (Tiger) circa 1936.

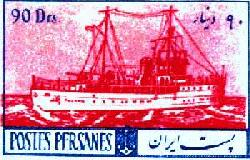
1950s era Iranian postage stamp illustrating the Iranian warship Palang (Leopard) sunk while moored at an Abadan pier, by the Royal Navy during a surprise attack on Iran, August 1941.

== Islamic Republic of Iran (1979–present) ==
With the fall of the Shah in the revolution of 1979, the Imperial Iranian Navy was renamed as the Islamic Republic of Iran Navy (IRIN). From then on, the United States imposed economic sanctions and an arms embargo, severely hampering Iran's ability to maintain and equip its navy. In fact, the navy was more severely affected than Iran's army or air force. Several of Iran's ships had to be laid up. Since 1979, the number of marines in the Islamic Republic of Iran Navy has expanded to, 2600 personnel, in two marine brigades, each composed of three battalions. These two brigades have also been reported as three battalions in the IRIN (which may be part of the Islamic Republic of Iran Army).

=== Iran–Iraq War ===
The Iran–Iraq War lasted from 1980 to 1988. The IRI Navy played a role in it. During this time, battles fought with Iraq and the United States, also degraded Iran's conventional naval assets.

Operation Morvarid was an operation launched by the Islamic Republic of Iran Navy and Air Force against the Iraqi Navy and Air Force on 28 November 1980 in response to Iraq positioning radar and monitoring equipment on the Al-Bakr and Khor-al-Amaya oil rigs to counter Iranian air operations. The operation resulted in a victory for Iran, which managed to destroy both oil rigs as well as much of the Iraqi Navy and inflicted significant damage to Iraqi ports and airfields.

On 18 April 1988, U.S. Marines, naval ships and aircraft operating within Iranian territorial waters destroyed Iranian naval and intelligence facilities on two inoperable oil platforms in the Persian Gulf, and sank at least three armed Iranian speedboats, one Iranian frigate, and one fast attack gunboat, and damaged one frigate in retaliation for the Iranian mining of the Persian Gulf and the subsequent damage to an American warship. The operation, dubbed Operation Praying Mantis, helped pressure Iran to agree to a ceasefire with Iraq later that summer, ending the eight-year conflict between the Persian Gulf neighbors.

=== Post-Iran–Iraq War ===
In place of western armaments, Iran has purchased equipment and weaponry from Russia, China, and North Korea, as well as engaging in naval exercises with Pakistan and India. The 1990s saw Iran focusing on building up its fleets of patrol boats and submarines, as well as surface-to-surface, anti-ship missiles.

Iran's goal has always been to provide escort for Iranian shipping in the Persian Gulf, as well as being able to disrupt enemy shipping, as was witnessed in the Iran–Iraq War.

On 22 February 2011, two Islamic Republic of Iran Navy ships entered the Suez Canal, on a deployment reported to be a training mission to Latakia, Syria. These were the tanker Kharg, and the frigate Alvand. This was the first time that Iranian naval ships had passed through the Suez Canal, since the 1979 Iranian Revolution.

On 18 February 2012, Kharg entered the Suez Canal again, with one other Iranian warship, after briefly docking at Jeddah in Saudi Arabia.

On 11 May 2020, Iranian frigate Jamaran fired a missile at Iranian support vessel Konarak. Official Iranian TV reported one fatality in the incident, while unofficial reports stated the Konarak had sunk and that there were dozens of fatalities.

On 11 June 2021, IRIS Sahand, accompanied by IRIS Makran (a naval-converted oil tanker), were the first Iranian naval ships to reach the Atlantic without docking in an international port, according to official Iranian sources. The ships are bound for Venezuela, reported to be carrying oil.
