= Port of Latakia =

Seaport in Latakia, Syria

Port of Latakia ميناء اللاذقية
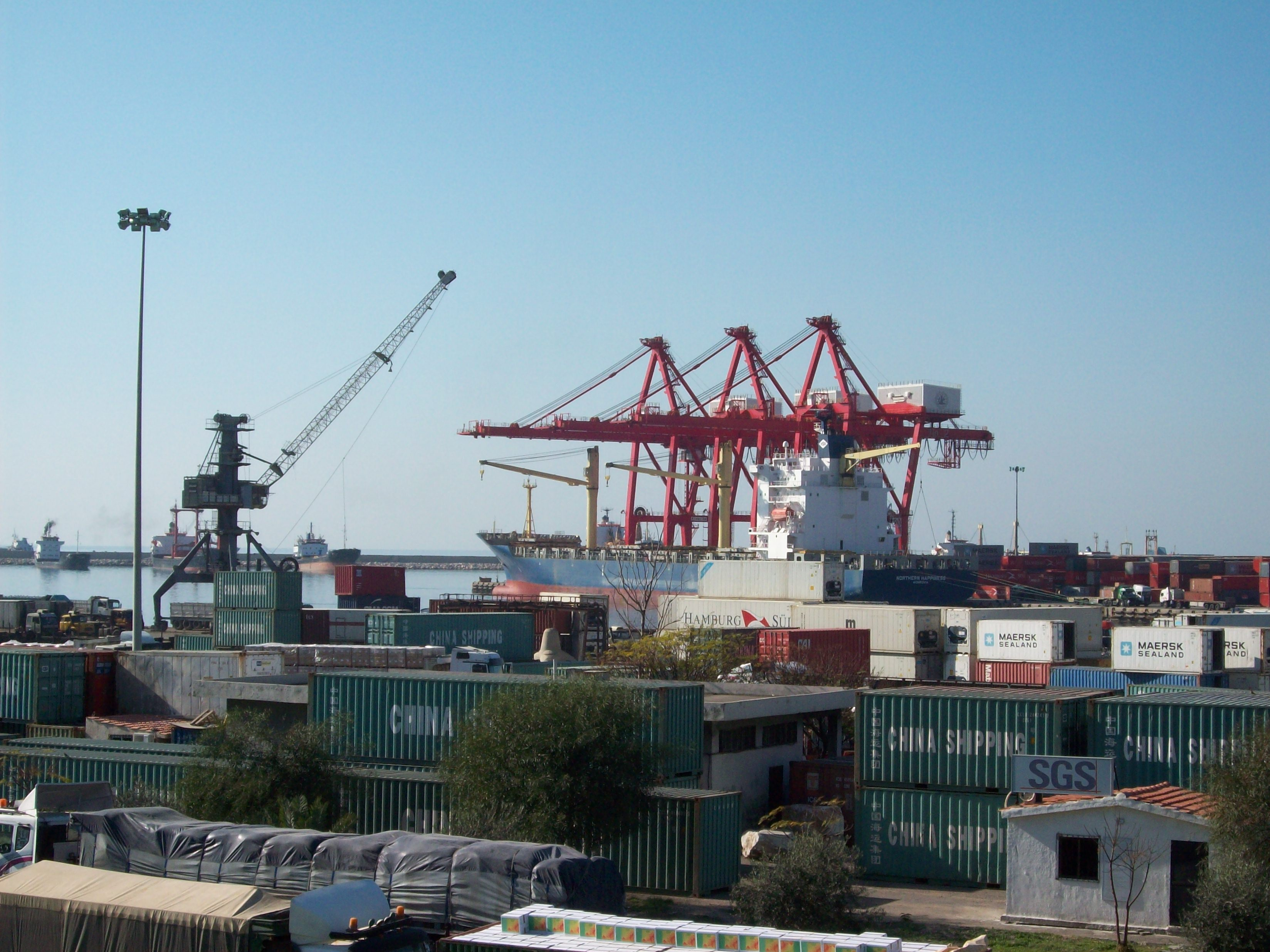
- Interactive map of Port of Latakia ميناء اللاذقية

Location
- Country: Syria
- Location: Latakia; Latakia Governorate
- Coordinates: 35°30′48″N 35°46′14″E
- UN/LOCODE: SYLTK

Details
- Opened: Ancient harbor: 2000 BC; Modern harbor: 1950
- Operated by: CMA CGM
- Owned by: State-owned
- Type of harbour: Natural
- Size of harbour: 135 hectares (0.52 mi^{2})
- Land area: 15 hectares (0.058 mi^{2})
- Size: 150 hectares (0.58 mi^{2})
- No. of wharfs: 32
- General Manager: Suleiman Asaad Baloush
- Cranes: 18
- Channel depth: 14.5 metres (48 ft)
- Warehouse space: 62.8 hectares (0.242 mi^{2})

Statistics
- Vessel arrivals: 1805
- Annual cargo tonnage: 8,093,000

The Port of Latakia (Arabic: ميناء اللاذقية, romanized: Mīnāʾ al-Lāḏiqīyah) is a seaport located on the Mediterranean Sea in the city of Latakia. Established on 12 February 1950, it has since served as Syria's main seaport.

Its imported cargo include clothing, construction materials, vehicles, furniture, minerals, tobacco, cotton, and food supplies such as lentils, onions, wheat, barley, dates, grains and figs, and in 2008 the port handled about 8 million tons of cargo.

The port is also a link in six organized cruises between Alexandria, İzmir and Beirut. In addition, there are irregular ferry services to Cyprus. In 2005, approximately 27,939 passengers used the port.

== History ==
A port has been present in Latakia since the early Roman Empire. Latakia was the only seaport in Syria at its independence in 1945 and exported cotton. In 1971, it handled 1.6 million tons of cargo. The port was expanded between 1980 and 1983. Today, the port's primary exports include crude oil and agricultural products like tobacco ("Latakia tobacco"), carobs, and cotton.

In 2019, Iran leased parts of the port of Latakia. This came after Russia opened military bases in Khmeimim and Tartus, both nearby. Joshua Landis described the Latakia deal as part of an Iranian plan to expand its influence to the Mediterranean and eventually sell energy products to Europe.

On 28 December 2021, shortly before dawn, the Israeli Air Force struck the port, causing heavy damage to a number of shipping containers. The site was also targeted by Israel a few weeks earlier on 7 December. An anonymous source claimed the containers were carrying weapons from Iran. According to SANA, the missile attack also wrecked the facades of a hospital, some residential buildings, and shops. The blaze was brought under control and no casualties were reported by Syrian authorities.

On the night of December 9, 2024, as part of a larger plan to neutralize Syrian military assets, the Israeli Navy launched a strike on warships in Latakia, sinking them. Photographs from the port of Latakia revealed sunken Osa-class (Project 205) missile boats, with P-15M Termit (SS-N-2C Styx) launchers visibly protruding above the water’s surface.

In May 2025, Syrian authorities signed a 30-year deal with the French shipping group CMA CGM involving the building of a new berth and the investment of €230 million in the port.

== General statistics ==
General statistics between 2002 and 2008
| Year | 2002 | 2003 | 2004 | 2005 | 2006 | 2007 | 2008 |
|---|---|---|---|---|---|---|---|
| Imports * | 3.644 | 3.871 | 5.083 | 6.239 | 6.931 | 6.349 | 6.800 |
| Exports * | 0.905 | 0.996 | 1.019 | 1.083 | 1.162 | 1.471 | 1.262 |

* figures in millions of tonnes

== Bibliography ==
- Ring, Trudy; Salkin, Robert M.; La Boda, Sharon (1994), International Dictionary of Historic Places, Taylor & Francis, ISBN 978-1-884964-03-9.
- Ball, Warwick (2000), Rome in the East: The Transformation of an Empire, Routledge, ISBN 978-0-415-11376-2.
- Maʻoz, Moshe; Yaniv, Avner; Gustav Heinemann Institute of Middle Eastern Studies (1986), Syria Under Assad: Domestic Constraints and Regional Risks, Taylor & Francis, ISBN 0-7099-2910-2.
