= Nader Mahdavi =

- Born: Hossein Basria; June 4, 1963; Dashti County, Bushehr Province, Iran
- Died: October 8, 1987 (aged 24); Farsi island, Persian Gulf, Iran
- Military career
- Allegiance: Iran
- Branch: Revolutionary Guards
- Service years: 1981–1987
- Commands: Zolfaghar Naval Squadron
- Conflicts: Iran–Iraq War; Operation Badr; Operation Karbala-3; Operation Earnest Will
- Website: Nader Mahdavi Website

Nader Mahdavi (Persian: نادر مهدوی) or Hossein Basria (Persian: حسین بسریا) was an Islamic Revolutionary Guard Corps naval commander who fought against United States naval forces and cruisers on 24 July 1987.

== Short biography ==
Hossein Basria was born on 4 June 1963 in Nokar village, Dashti County, Bushehr Province. When he was in high school, economic issues and his political activities made him leave school and he started working in his father's store. After the Iranian revolution, he joined the Basij group. When Iran-Iraq war started, he wanted to go to battlefields but he was underage and was prevented from entering the war. On 20 April 1981, he was employed in the Islamic Revolutionary Guard Corps (IRGC). He married Sakineh Jokar in 1982.

== First battle with United States ==
At the end of the Iran–Iraq War, the Persian Gulf was an unsafe place for Iranians, because Iraqi forces could easily bomb Iranian ships and oil platforms. Also, American naval forces protected Kuwaiti ships in the Persian Gulf and the Strait of Hormuz. Commanders of the Islamic Revolutionary Guard Corps informed Ruhollah Khomeini, leader of Iran, about American cruisers in the Persian Gulf. Khomeini said, "If it was me, i would attack them". For this reason, Nader Mahdavi prepared his forces for operations against American cruisers.

Nader Mahdavi's mission was preventing Bridgeton's movement.

On 24 July 1987, three U.S. warships escorted the Kuwaiti oil tanker al-Rekkah into the Persian Gulf. By mutual agreement, Al-Rekkah had been renamed Bridgeton and sailed under U.S. flag. USS Crommelin, USS Fox, and USS Kidd. Thirteen miles west of Iran's Farsi Island in the Persian Gulf, the tanker hit an underwater mine, denting its hull but leaving it seaworthy. For the rest of the journey, the warships sailed in the tanker's wake.

== Death ==
On 8 October 1987, Mahdavi and his soldiers went to Persian Gulf for patrolling and they took one Stinger missile. Near Farsi, an American helicopter attacked them in the night and the Stinger automatic system activated and shot it down. After a 20-minute battle, Mahdavi was arrested by American forces. Six days after his death, his body was sent to Iran from Oman. Iranian state media outlets said his hands and feet were tied very tightly and his chest was pierced with long iron nails, suggesting he was tortured aboard the USS Chandler; no independent sources have confirmed this.

== In popular culture ==
=== Films ===
- Encounter With Devil (Persian: رو در رو با شیطان) is documentary film that narrates the war between Iran and United States in Persian Gulf. There are some episodes in the film that show Nader Mahdavi's interview of that time.

=== Books ===
- Nader, My Brother Hossein (Persian: نادر، برادرم حسین) are Nader Mahdavi's brother's memories about him as recorded by Seyyid Ghasim Yahosseini. The book, published by Fatehan Publication Company, is first book about Mahdavi.
- A second was Behind the Wave Stronghold (Persian: پشت سنگر موج). The narrators Hassan Sharifi and Seyyid Ghasim Yahosseini recorded their memories about Nader. In 2009, the book was published by Fatehan Publication Company in 3,000 copies.
- Once Again, Nader (Persian: بار دیگر، نادر) is a biography of Nader Mahdavi by Seyyid Ghasim Yahosseini. The book was published by Fatehan Publication Company in 2015.

=== Postage stamp ===
- On 8 April 2015, Nader Mahdavi's postage stamp was released in Bushehr Province.

== See also ==
- Bridgton incident
- Mohammad Ebrahim Hemmat
