= Operation Prime Chance =

1987–89 US operation of the Iran–Iraq War

- Part of the Iran–Iraq War and the Tanker War
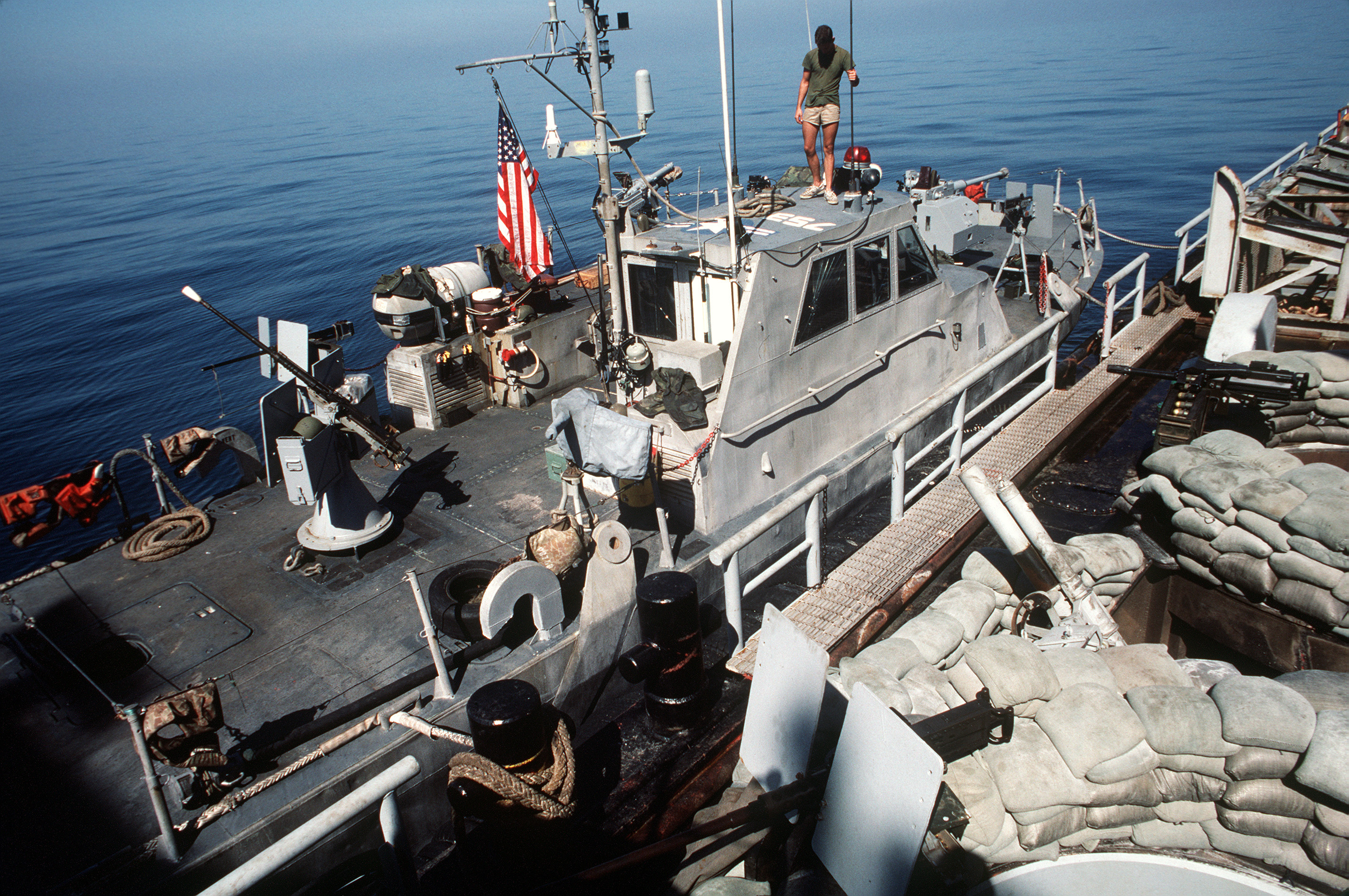
- A U.S. Navy crewman stands atop the cabin of a PB Mark III patrol boat tied up to the oil rig service barge Wimbrown VII in the northern Persian Gulf. From lower to upper right, the barge is armed with a .50-caliber M2 machine gun, an 81 mm Mark 2 mortar, and a 40 mm Mk 19 grenade launcher.
- Location: Persian Gulf
- Planned by: United States Special Operations Command
- Date: August 1987 – June 1989
- Outcome: Operational success
- Casualties: 5 Iranian killed, 26 Iranian captured (during raid on Iran Ajr only); Other parts of the operation are not included in this number

Operation Prime Chance (August 1987 – June 1989) was a United States Special Operations Command operation intended to protect U.S.-flagged oil tankers from Iranian attack during the Iran–Iraq War. The operation took place roughly at the same time as Operation Earnest Will (July 1987 – September 1988), the largely naval effort to escort the tankers through the Persian Gulf. The operation was begun after the mining of the U.S.-flagged Kuwaiti oil tanker Bridgeton.

== Overview ==
The two operations were intertwined—United States Army helicopters flew nighttime search-and-destroy missions from Navy frigates and destroyers and from two leased barges in the northern Persian Gulf. Navy SEALs and explosive ordnance disposal operated from the barges as well. But while Earnest Will was the widely publicized reaction to Kuwaiti pleas for help, Prime Chance was secret.

The army helicopters flew at night, flying between navy flight decks under cover of darkness. The helicopter pilots often flew some 30 feet (9.1 m) above the water, and were among the first American helicopter pilots to use night vision goggles and forward looking infrared devices in combat. Tactics included using MH-6 Little Birds as spotters for the more heavily armed AH-6s for barge-launched missions, and using the warship's radar and that of their SH-60 Seahawk helicopters for the same purpose on ship-launched efforts.

== Planning ==
Planning and preparation for Prime Chance was launched soon after a tanker on the very first Earnest Will convoy struck a mine, which made it clear that more forces would be necessary to assure the safety of the civilian vessels. The Joint Chiefs of Staff launched a search for helicopter pilots who could fly at night from navy ships, then set out to train them for the special requirements of the job. Helicopters from the army's 160th Special Operations Aviation Regiment (Airborne) reached the navy's command ship La Salle in the Persian Gulf on 5 August 1987.

The detachment was divided into two teams, with call sign SEABAT and one MH-6 Little Bird, two AH-6s, aircrew, and maintainers. On 8 August, one detachment participated in a convoy escort mission aboard La Salle. The other flew onto the frigate Klakring to protect minesweepers operating in the narrow shipping channel west of Farsi Island. The following day, the La Salle detachment transferred to the frigate Jarrett and escorted the convoy to the Gulf of Oman.

== Execution ==
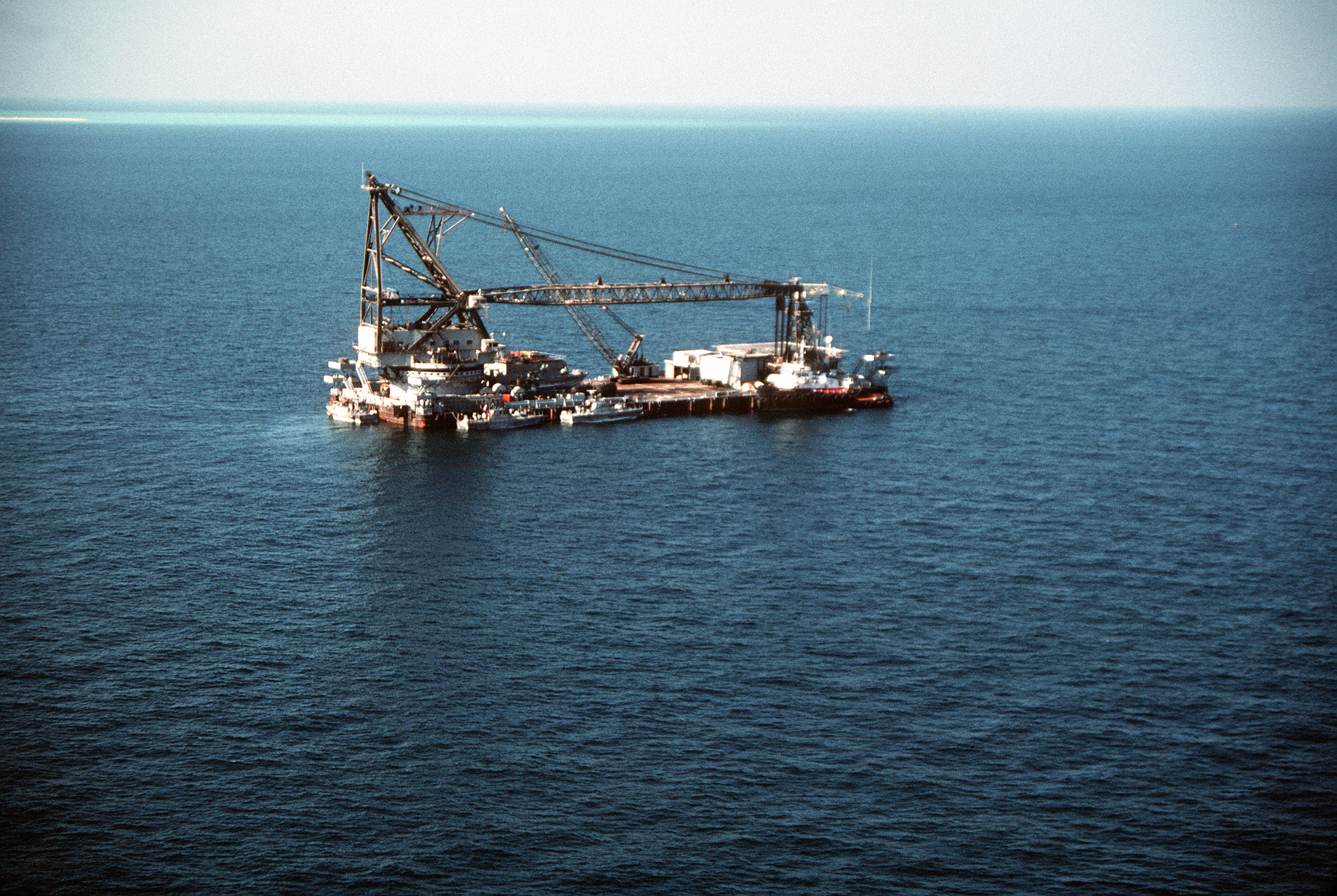
An aerial view of the leased barge Hercules with three Mark III patrol boats and the tugboat Mister John H tied up alongside in the northern Persian Gulf.

Soon afterward, operations began from the barges, dubbed Mobile Sea Bases (MSBs). They were set up as naval special warfare task units (NSWTU) run by a SEAL commander and answering to the regional naval special warfare task group. Their mission was to stop Iranian forces from mining the Persian Gulf or otherwise attacking shipping. Each mobile sea base had two detachments of Mark III patrol boats, a SEAL platoon, an EOD detachment, 3d Low Altitude Air Defense Battalion to provide FIM-92 Stinger Air defense supplementing barge security, army MH-6 and AH-6 Little Bird helicopter gunships and Black Hawk rescue helicopters, and air force combat controllers.

Mobile Sea Base Hercules was crewed by East Coast naval special warfare units, including Patrol Boats 777 and 758 from Special Boat Unit 20 and Special Boat Unit 24. Mobile Sea Base Wimbrown 7 was crewed by West Coast units, including Patrol Boats 753 and 757 from Special Boat Unit 13 and Patrol Boats 775 and 776 from Special Boat Unit 12.

On 21 September 1987, Iran Ajr, an Iranian ship converted for use as a minelayer, was attacked. Using night-vision devices, Army gunship crews watched the Iranian vessel lay several mines, then swooped in firing miniguns and rockets. A SEAL team boarded the vessel and quickly seized it. During the attack, five Iranians were killed and 26 were captured. Several Iranian sailors were rescued from the waters of the Persian Gulf after jumping overboard during the attack. After collecting intelligence data the SEALs and EOD scuttled the vessel the following day.

In January 1988, Task Force 118 arrived with OH-58D Kiowa Warrior helicopters.

Earnest Will ended about five months after the Iran-Iraq ceasefire began in July 1988. Wimbrown 7 soon returned to port, but Prime Chance patrols continued from Hercules until June 1989.

== Units ==
Ships involved in Prime Chance included:

- Mobile Sea Bases Hercules and Wimbrown 7, barges leased from an oil company for use by SEALs, EOD, Marines 3rd LAAD (Stinger_Air Defense), Navy small-boat crews, and Army helicopters
- USS Jarrett (FFG-33)
- USS John A. Moore (FFG-19)
- USS Klakring (FFG-42)
- USS Samuel B. Roberts (FFG-58)
- USS Thach (FFG-43)
- USS La Salle (AGF-3)
- USS Reuben James (FFG-57)
- USS Guadalcanal (LPH-7)
- USS Copeland (FFG-25)
- USS Dewert (FFG-45)
- USS Elrod (FFG-55)
- USS Fahrion (FFG-22)
- USS Ford (FFG-54)
- USS Gallery (FFG-26)
- USS Gary (FFG-51)
- USS Hawes (FFG-53)
- USS Callaghan (DDG-994)
- USS Conolly (DD-979)
- USS McClusky (FFG-41)
- USS Taylor (FFG-50)
- USS Raleigh (LPD-1)
- USS Okinawa (LPH-3)
- USS Deyo (DD-989)
- USS William H. Standley (CG-32)
- USS Reid (FFG-30)
- USS Puget Sound (AD-38)

Units involved in Prime Chance included:

- 160th Special Operations Aviation Regiment (Airborne), nicknamed the "Night Stalkers": the army's elite special-operations aviation regiment
- Task Force 118, a regular army aviation unit flying AH-58D Warrior helicopters whose mast-mounted IR sights helped spot small boats. On 15 January 1991, the unit became 4th Squadron, 17th Cavalry Regiment, and then in 1994, 4th Squadron, 2d Cavalry Regiment.
- SEAL Team 1
- SEAL Team 2
- EOD Mobile Unit Five
- EOD Mobile Unit Six
- Special Boat Unit 11
- Special Boat Unit 12
- Special Boat Unit 13
- Special Boat Unit 20
- Special Boat Unit 24
- 3rd Battalion 325th Airborne Battalion Combat Team SETAF
- Detachment from 1st Battalion 5th Marines
- 3d Low Altitude Air Defense Battalion
- 3/4 ADAR, 82nd Airborne Division. Vulcan crews provided surface defense.
- 174th Military Intelligence Company, 513th Military Intelligence Brigade, provided intelligence to Wimbrown 7
- Detachment from 1st Battalion 2nd Marines.
