= Bridgeton incident =

1987 Iran–Iraq War event in the Persian Gulf

- Part of the Tanker War
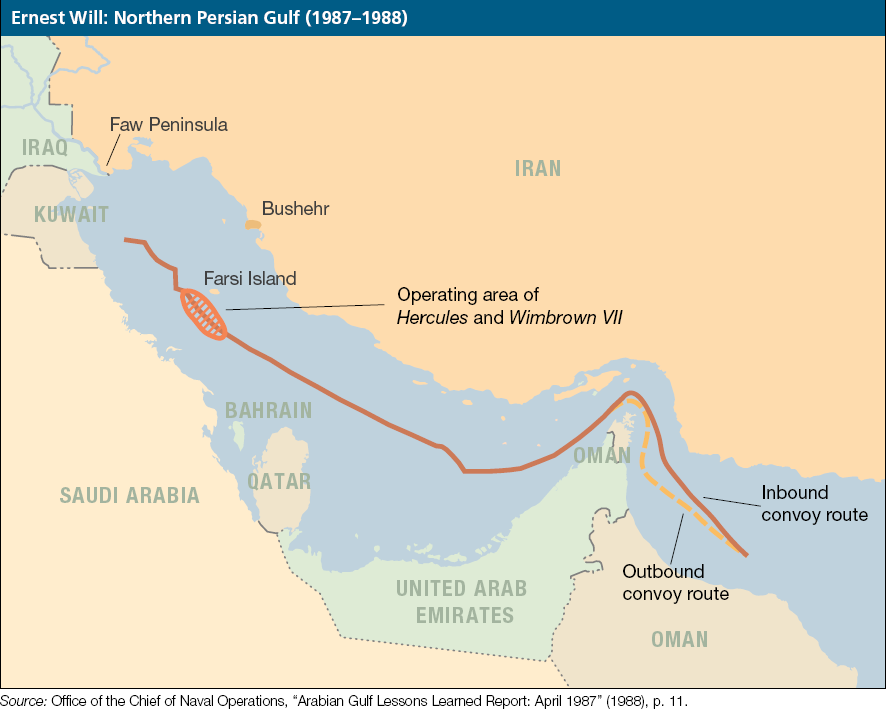
- The convoy's route
- Type: Naval mining
- Location: 13 miles west of Farsi Island, Persian Gulf; 27°58′N 49°50′E
- Target: the US-escorted convoy
- Date: 24 July 1987
- Executed by: IRGC Navy base in Farsi Island
- Outcome: A mine successfully hit the escorted tanker

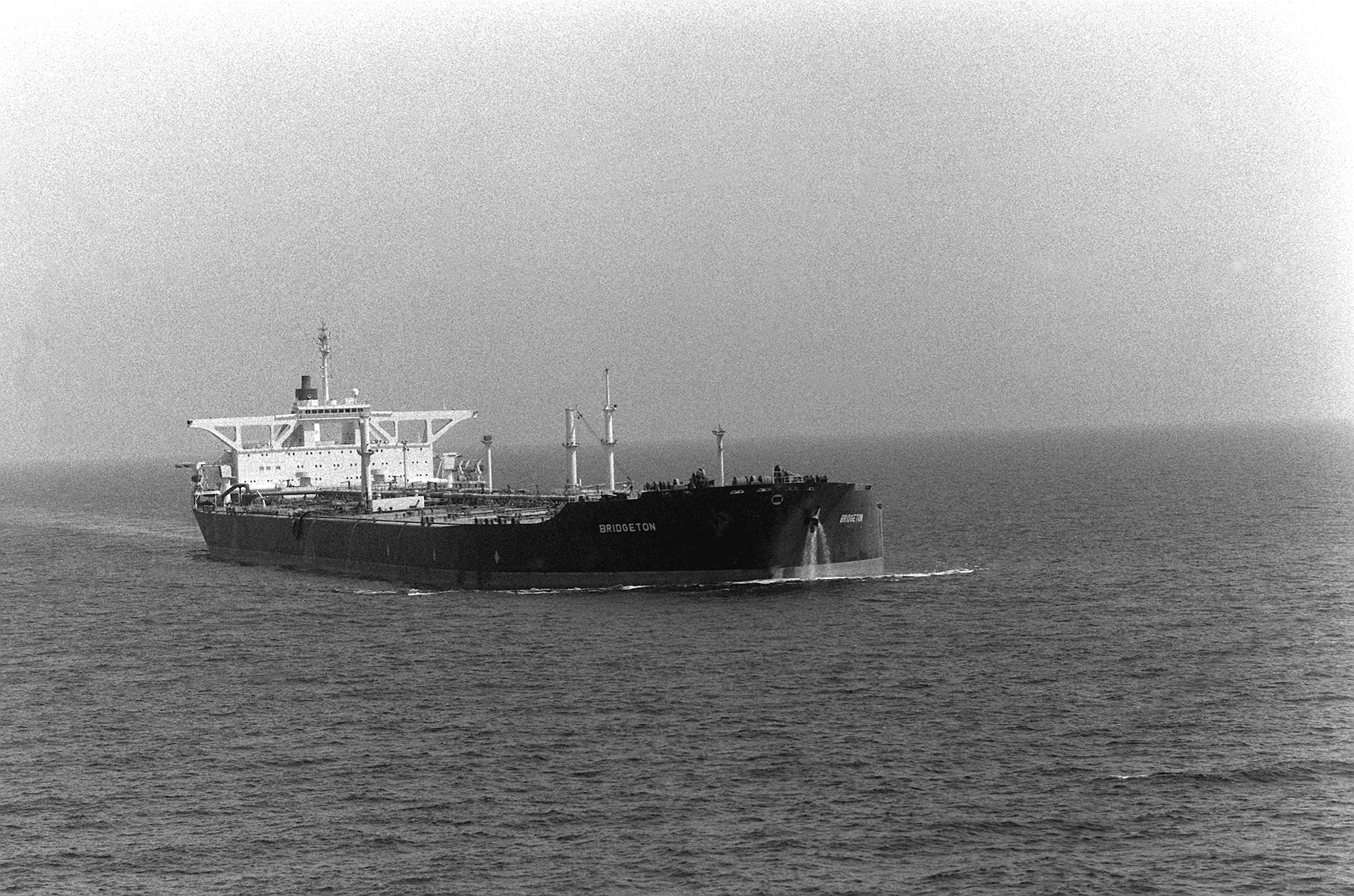
Bridgeton during Operation Earnest Will

The Bridgeton incident was the mining of the supertanker SS Bridgeton by the Iranian IRGC navy near Farsi Island in the Persian Gulf on July 24, 1987. The ship was sailing in the first convoy of Operation Earnest Will, the U.S. response to Kuwaiti requests to protect its tankers from attack amid the Iran–Iraq War.

The explosion of an Iranian mine in the Gulf's shipping channel damaged Bridgeton's outer hull but did not prevent her from completing her voyage. Nevertheless, the incident was a propaganda victory for Iran. The captain of the ship complained about the information given to the press, by United States politicians following a meeting with President Reagan, and the fact that four warships and a carrier group could not prevent Iran from placing a small minefield in the supposedly secret, but compromised, route of the tanker.

== Background ==
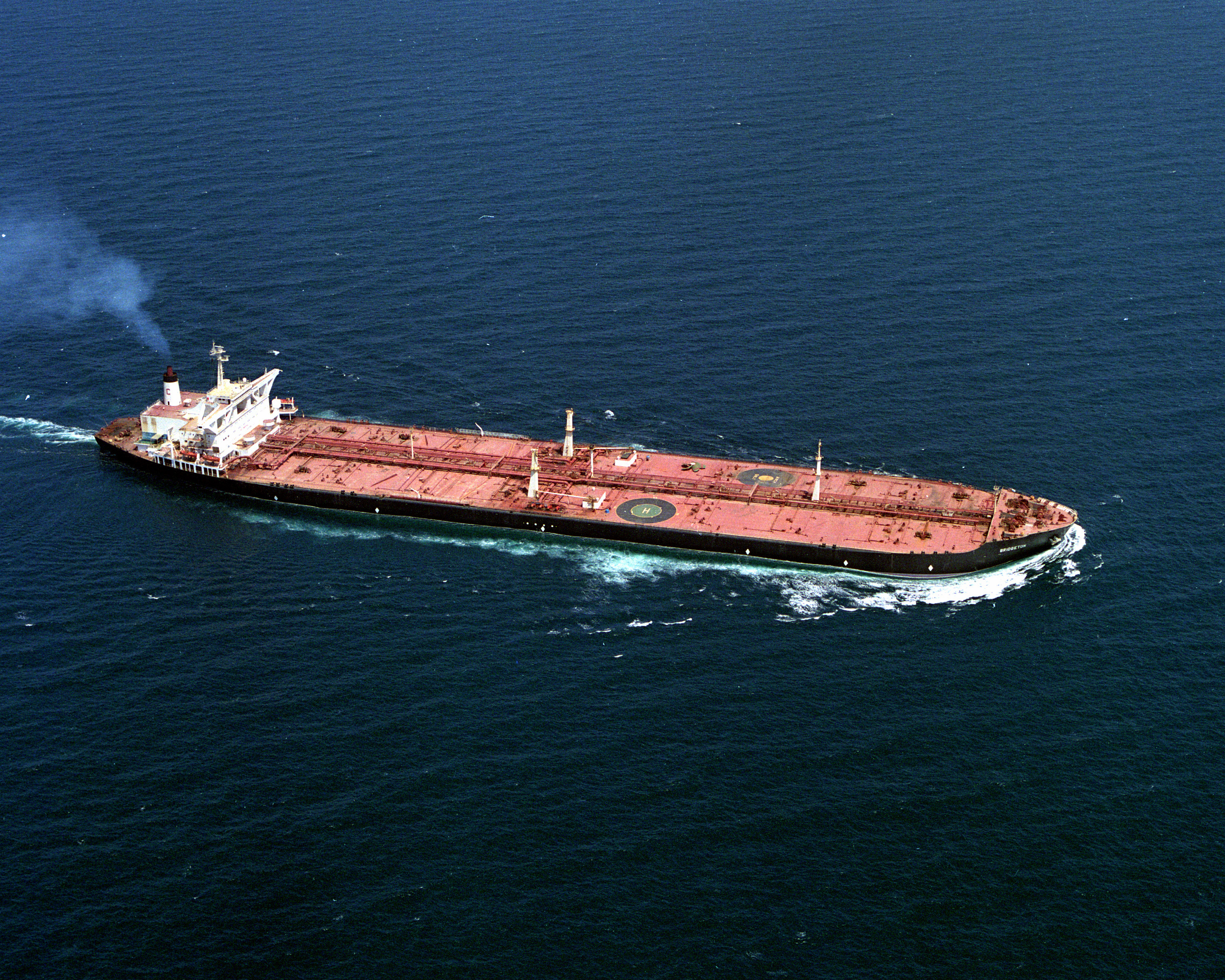
The tanker Bridgeton

Within a year of launching the Iran–Iraq War in 1980, Iraq began attacking ships carrying oil from Iranian ports, seeking to intimidate Tehran's allies and trading partners and deprive Iran of oil revenues. In 1984, Iran began to follow suit, attacking the tankers of countries that supported Iraq. In 1987, Kuwait, whose ships carried Iraqi oil, asked both the Soviet Union and the United States for military help.

Initially, Moscow offered to loan Kuwait three Soviet-flagged oil tankers and to protect them with Soviet Navy warships. In response, and in light of United Nations Security Council Resolution 598, the United States suggested that Kuwaiti tankers fly American flags and travel in convoys protected by the U.S. Navy. This convoy effort was dubbed Operation Earnest Will.

== Incident ==
Assembled to protect Kuwait's tankers were four frigates, three cruisers, and a destroyer in or around the Persian Gulf and the Strait of Hormuz. As well, the U.S. aircraft carrier Constellation and her task force were nearby in the Indian Ocean, while the battleship Missouri, two more cruisers, and a helicopter carrier were patrolling the area. The operation's plan called for convoys protected by three or four U.S. warships and carrier-based aircraft, including A-6 attack aircraft, F/A-18 strike fighters, EA-6B jamming aircraft, and F-14 fighters.

On July 21, 1987, the 414,266-ton Bridgeton and the 48,233-ton gas tanker Gas Prince sailed from the Gulf of Oman under the protection of three U.S. warships in the first convoy of Earnest Will. It transited the Strait of Hormuz without incident, although the group was approached by four Iranian F-4 fighters.

When the convoy arrived at the midpoint of its voyage, Iran proclaimed that the convoy carried "prohibited goods". Pasdaran commander Mohsen Rezaee initially ordered an attack by Pasdaran speedboats from Farsi Island, but later, based on advice from the Iranian Supreme Leader, Ayatollah Khomeini, it was agreed to that a mining operation was preferable to direct confrontation. A special Pasdaran unit which had spent several weeks practicing for this mission laid a string of nine mines 500 yards (460 m) apart, and then hastened back to Farsi.

American intelligence had discovered Rezai's aborted unauthorized attack but missed the mining operation. On July 24, Bridgeton collided with a mine at a position of 27°58' north and 49°50' east, 13 miles west of Farsi Island. The explosion caused a 43-square-meter (460 sq ft) dent in the body of the oil tanker. Bridgeton slowed, but did not stop. Meanwhile, the U.S. warships took station in the tanker's wake, allowing the big double-hulled ship to break trail.

== Aftermath ==
One day before the incident, Rear Admiral Harold J. Bernsen, commander of the Middle East Force, said, "The Iranian Air Force and Navy are not strong. It would not be in their best interest to utilize their forces in a direct confrontation". After the incident, Bernsen said there had been indications that Iran had laid mines, but no one thought they would affect the convoy.

Following the incident, the Pentagon announced it would deploy more warships to the area, and Defense Secretary Caspar Weinberger announced that the U.S. would retaliate against any country that laid mines in the way of Kuwait-bound ships. Although there was no authenticated evidence of Iran culpability, American officials were all convinced that the Pasdaran force had laid mines on the night before the incident. Weinberger said minesweeping would be given the highest priority.

The Bridgeton incident was a propaganda victory for Iran. Prime Minister Mir-Hossein Mousavi called it "an irreparable blow on America's political and military prestige". Akbar Hashemi Rafsanjani said, "From now on, if our wells, installations, and centers are hit, we will make the installations and centers of Iraq's partners the targets of our attacks".

== See also ==
- Iran Air Flight 655
- Nader Mahdavi
- Operation Nimble Archer
- Operation Praying Mantis
- Operation Prime Chance
- USS Stark incident
