= SS Bridgeton =

Kuwaiti oil tanker; struck an Iranian mine in 1987 during Operation Earnest Will

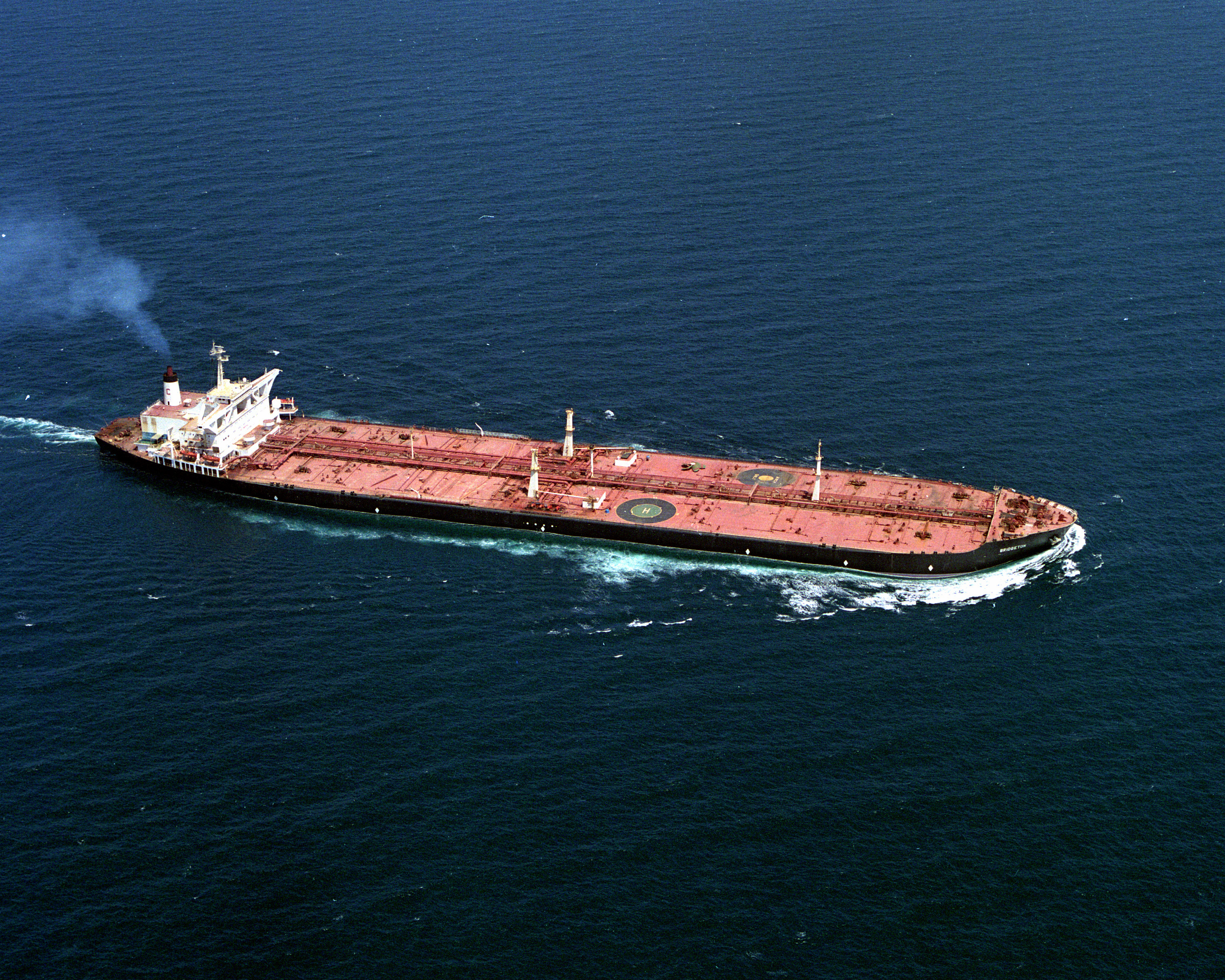
- Bridgeton, 1993

History
- Name: 1976: al-Rekkah; 1987: Bridgeton; 1997: Pacific Blue
- Owner: 1976: Kuwait Oil Tanker Company; 1987: Chesapeake Shipping, Inc.; before 1997: Keystone Shipping Company; 1997: Kafa Navigation Corporation
- Port of registry: 1977: Kuwait; 1987: (United States) Philadelphia; 1997: Panama
- Builder: Mitsubishi Heavy Industries, Nagasaki
- Yard number: 1744
- Launched: August 14, 1976
- In service: 1977
- Out of service: 2002
- Identification: Call sign 3FSK6; IMO number: 7376915
- Fate: Scrapped by Haryana Ship Demolition, Alang, 2002

General characteristics
- Class & type: Tank Ship, ULCC
- Tonnage: 413,842 DWT; 199,430 GT ITC; 161,685 NET
- Length: 1,158.5 ft (353.1 m)
- Beam: 229.9 ft (70.1 m)
- Draft: 96.2 ft (29.3 m)
- Propulsion: Kawasaki Steam
- Speed: 16 knots (30 km/h)
- Notes: References

MV Bridgeton, ex-al-Rekkah, was a Kuwait Oil Company oil tanker that was reflagged to a U.S flag and renamed during Operation Earnest Will. The ship was built by Mitsubishi Heavy Industries in its Nagasaki shipyard and launched August 14, 1976. Bridgeton was part of the first Earnest Will convoy when it struck an Iranian mine near Farsi Island resulting in a major propaganda victory for the Iranians. In the late 1990s, Bridgeton transferred to Panamanian registry and was renamed Pacific Blue. It was scrapped in 2002 at Haryana Ship Demolition in Alang, India.

== Ship history ==
Ordered and built as al-Rekkah, the ship was built by Mitsubishi Heavy Industries in its Nagasaki shipyard and launched August 14, 1976.

In 1987, the United States agreed to Kuwaiti requests to provide naval escorts for its tankers on the condition that the civilian ships be reflagged under U.S. flag and al-Rekkah was perforce renamed Bridgeton. On July 24, 1987, Bridgeton was part of the first Earnest Will convoy when it struck an Iranian mine near Farsi Island. The explosion breached the outer hull and the forward cargo tanks, spilling oily residue. The ship sailed to Dubai Drydock Shipyard for repairs. The mining prompted Operation Prime Chance, a secret effort to stop more minelaying. In September 1987, Iran Ajr was discovered laying mines, captured and scuttled by U.S. forces.

Some of the reflagged tankers returned to Kuwaiti flags in January 1989, but Bridgeton and several others remained U.S.-flagged.

In the late 1990s, Bridgeton transferred to Panamanian registry and was renamed Pacific Blue. It was scrapped in 2002 at Haryana Ship Demolition in Alang, India.
