= Tanker war =

1981–88 naval attacks of the Iran–Iraq War

- Part of the Iran–Iraq War
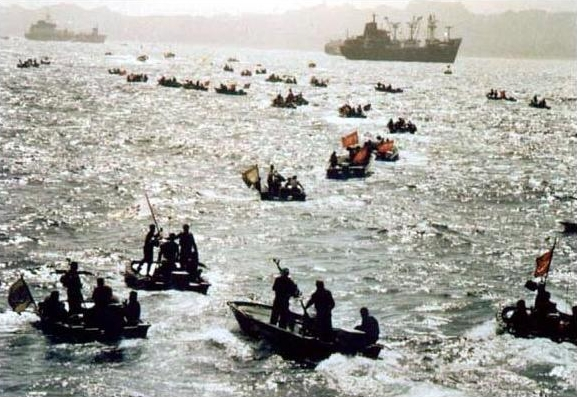
- IRGC Navy speedboats in the Tanker War, 1987
Date	1981 – 4 August 1988
Location	Persian Gulf, Strait of Hormuz, Sea of Oman
Result	Iraqi coalition victory

Belligerents
Iran	Ba'athist Iraq United States; Saudi Arabia; Kuwait

Units involved
(Iran) Iranian Navy (Iran) IRGC Navy (Iran) Iranian Air Force	Iraqi Navy; Iraqi Air Force; United States Navy; Royal Saudi Air Force

The tanker war, part of the larger Iran–Iraq War, was a series of military attacks by Iran and Iraq against merchant vessels in the Persian Gulf and Strait of Hormuz from 1981 to 1988. Iraq was responsible for 283 attacks. Iran accounted for 168.

== History ==
The Iran–Iraq war began in September 1980. In December 1980, UN Secretary General Kurt Waldheim appealed to Iran and Iraq to ensure the security of peaceful shipping in the Persian Gulf. At that time, Iran assured other countries that it would keep the Strait of Hormuz open.

In 1981, Iraq began attacking commercial shipping to undermine Iran's war effort. First, Iraqi forces targeted vessels transporting military supplies to the Iranian ground forces. Later, they expanded their campaign and attacked ships carrying Iranian exports. Iran retaliated by attacking vessels of Iraq's trading partners and countries that provided financial support to Iraq. The first phase of the Tanker War began in May 1981, when Iraq declared that they will attack all ships traveling to or from Iranian ports in the northern Persian Gulf. To enforce this threat, Iraq relied primarily on air power, using its Super Frelon helicopters and F-1 Mirage and MiG-23 fighter aircraft armed with Exocet anti-ship cruise missiles. Between 1981 and 1983, however, Iranian forces generally refrained from retaliation.

In 1984, Iraq broadened the tanker war by attacking the oil terminal and oil tankers at Kharg Island. Iraq's aim in attacking Iranian shipping was to provoke the Iranians to retaliate with extreme measures, such as closing the Strait of Hormuz to all maritime traffic, thereby bringing about foreign intervention against Iran.

In response, Iran began attacking tankers traveling to and from Kuwait and other Gulf Arab states that supported Iraq's war effort. As Iranian attacks intensified, Kuwait sought external protection for its shipping and began negotiating with the Soviet Union to provide naval escorts for its tankers.

The United States had threatened several times to intervene if the Strait of Hormuz were closed. Kuwait and Saudi Arabia supported Iraq against Iran. The United States intervened in the conflict in 1986 to protect Kuwaiti tankers, and engaged in a confrontation with Iran.

Both sides had declared an "exclusion zone", meaning areas in which they had warned ships from entering. Iraq declared the area around Iran's Kharg Island to be an exclusion zone. Kharg Island hosted Iran's principal oil shipment port. Iraq gave precise definition, in coordinates, of this exclusion zone and gave advance notification to all countries. However, Iraq did not designate any safe passage routes in this zone.

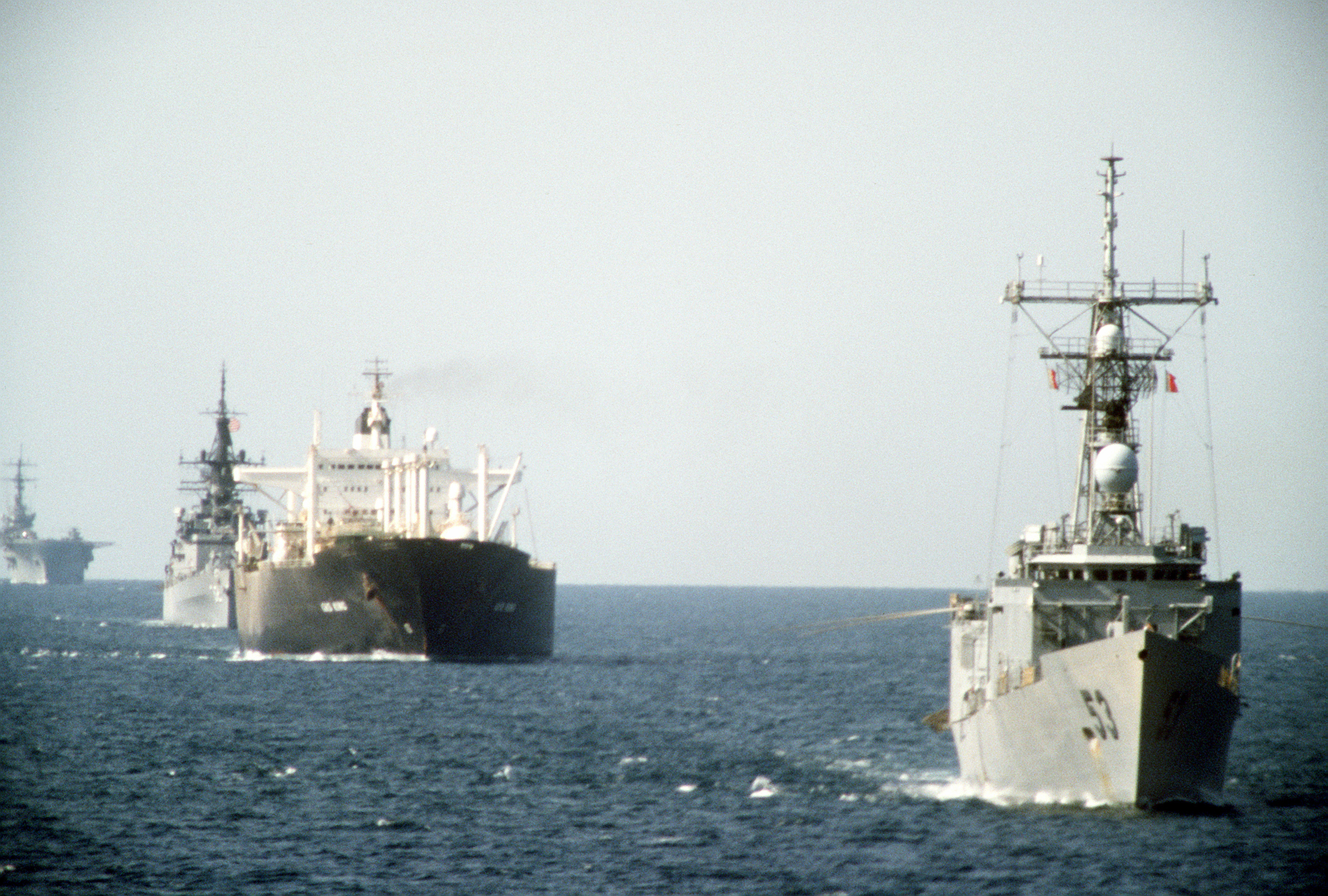
USS Hawes, USS William H. Standley and USS Guadalcanal escort tanker Gas King in the Persian Gullf on 21 October 1987

Iran declared all waters within 40 miles of its coast to be its exclusion zone. It instructed ships headed for non-Iranian ports to sail west of this line. While Iran also did not designate any safe passages in its exclusion zone, this was unnecessary. Iran's exclusion zone allowed for ships to enter and exit the Gulf, and essentially only kept such foreign ships out of its own waters. Iran's exclusion zone made it easier for Iraq to target Iranian ships. It allowed Iraq to assume that any ship in Iran's territorial waters must be going to (or coming from) an Iranian port.

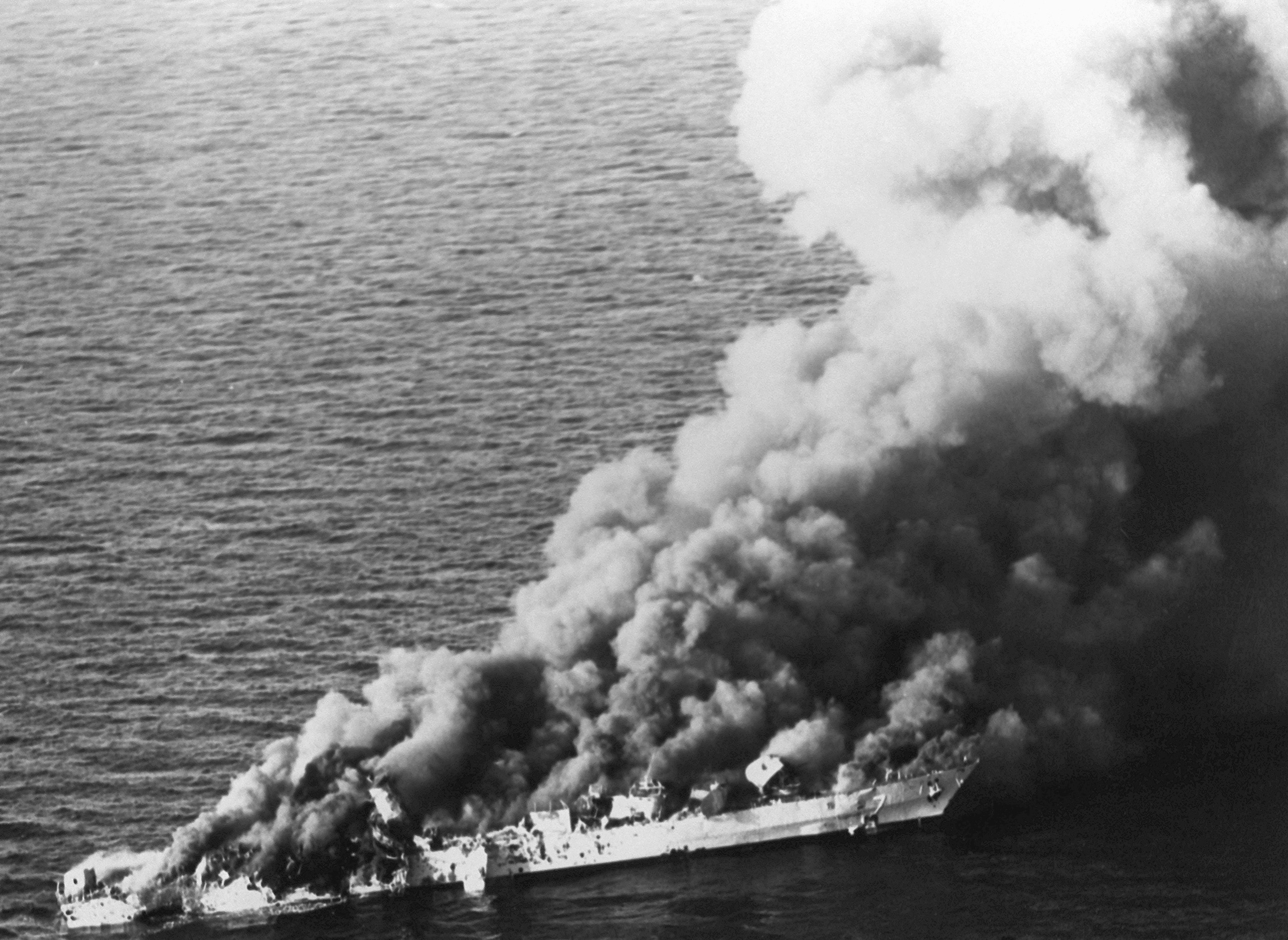
The Iranian frigate IRIS Sahand burning from bow to stern on 18 April 1988 after being attacked by the US Navy during Operation Praying Mantis

War studies scholar Stephen Phillips writes that "In January 1987, the Kuwaiti government proposed a clever scheme to deter Iranian attacks against their shipping. They asked the United States if they could reflag Kuwaiti tankers as American and receive the protection of the U.S. Navy. The administration of President Ronald Reagan debated this idea but finally agreed to it on March 7, 1987." These are known to O'Rourke as "reflagged Kuwaiti ships". On 17 May 1987, 37 US sailors were killed in an Iraqi aircraft attack on the USS Stark. Iraqi president Saddam Hussein apologized, saying that the pilot had mistaken the US vessel for an Iranian tanker.

United Nations Security Council Resolution 598, was adopted unanimously on 20 July 1987, which engendered Operation Earnest Will (24 July 1987 – 26 September 1988), a successful US effort to protect Kuwaiti merchant shipping, because as noted by O'Rourke: "Aside from Iranian shipping, the most frequent victims have been ships steaming under the world's predominant flags of convenience." Western-led convoy tactics with armed guard vessels were used for protection in the latter stages of the Tanker War. In 1987, the use of towed, radar-deflecting decoys and other passive countermeasures was successfully initiated.

In total, well over 100 sailors were killed and a similar number wounded. More than 30 million tons of cargo was damaged from 1981 to 1987. In 1987, during the conflict, Iran perfected the art of speedboat attacks, and concentrated "their fire on the crew compartments of their target ships." Iran also used Chinese-made shore-based Silkworm missiles to good effect.

Flag	Attacks sustained
Liberia	61
Iran	46
Panama	41
Cyprus	39
Greece	26
Malta	9
Kuwait	8
Saudi Arabia	8
Turkey	7
Norway	7
Singapore	6
UK	6
Japan	6
South Korea	5
West Germany	5

== List of attacks ==
=== 1984 ===
Date	Vessel attacked			Agent	Result	Ref
Date	Name	Flag	GRT/Date	Agent	Result	Ref
1984-03-01	Charming	United Kingdom	Unknown	Iraqi missile	aground	
1984-03-01(?)	Sema-G	Turkey	Unknown	Iraqi missile	set afire	
1984-03-04	APJ Ambika	India	16000	Iraqi missile	sunk	
1984-03-29	Iran Dahr	Iran	12257/71	Iraqi missile	damaged	
1984-05-27	Savoy Dean	Liberia	19291/68	Iraqi missile	minor damage	
1984-06-03	Büyük Hun	Turkey	80683/77	Iraqi missiles	severe damage	
1984-06-03	Giant Kirn	Panama	32107/71	Unidentified missile	set afire	
1984-06-06	Dashaki	Liberia	19291/68	Iraqi missile	severe damage	
1984-06-10	Kazimah	Kuwait	160010/82	Unidentified a/c	severe damage	
1984-06-24	Alexander the Great	Greece	152372/73	Iraqi Exocet missile	severe damage	
1984-06-27	Tiburón	Liberia	125389/73	Iraqi missile	severe damage	
1984-07-01	Al Kabeer	Panama	16575/65	Iraqi a/c	aground	
1984-07-01	Sitia Venture	Panama	15991/66	Iraqi a/c	aground	
1984-07-01	Alexandra Dyo	Cyprus	13316/69	Iraqi a/c	attacked	
1984-07-02	Won Jin	South Korea	6164/74	Iraqi missiles	severe damage	
1984-07-05	Primrose	Liberia	122203/76	Unidentified missiles	slight damage	
1984-07-10	British Renown	United Kingdom	122203/76	Iranian a/c	slight damage	
1984-08-18	Endeavour	Panama	47310/76	Unidentified missile	set afire	
1984-08-24	Amethyst	Cyprus	31280/63	Unidentified missile	set afire	
1984-08-27	Cleo 1	Panama	20880/59	Unidentified missile	set afire	
1984-09-11	St. Tobias	Liberia	115025/71	Unidentified missile	minor damage	
1984-09-12	Good Wind	Panama	11525/70	Iraqi missile	set afire	
1984-09-16	Med Heron	Liberia	60655/77	Unidentified missile	Unknown	
1984-09-16	Royal Colombo	South Korea	74474/75	Unidentified missile	Unknown	
1984-10-08	World Knight	Liberia	114573/75	Iraqi missile	severe damage (Note: constructive loss)	
1984-10-11	Jag Pari	India	20991/82	Iranian (?) bomb	minor damage	
1984-10-12	Gaz Fountain	Panama	23796/69	Unidentified missile	set afire	
1984-10-15	Sivand	Iran	108721/71	Iraqi a/c	set afire	

=== 1985 ===
Date	Vessel attacked			Agent	Result	Ref
Date	Name	Flag	GRT/Date	Agent	Result	Ref
1985-11-05	Canaria	Greece	151225	Iraqi Exocet missile	severe damage (Note: Sold off and renamed Canari, exploded while scrapping on 1986-08-11. See:zh-tw:大仁宮廢船爆炸事件)	

=== 1987 ===
Date	Vessel attacked			Agent	Result	Ref
Date	Name	Flag	GRT/Date	Agent	Result	Ref
1987-07-24	SS Bridgeton	United States		Iranian mine	damaged	
1987-08-10	Texaco Caribbean	Panama		Iranian mine	damaged	
1987-08-15	Anita			Iranian mine	sunk	
1987-08-30	Sanandaj	Iran	129770/73	Iraqi a/c	damaged	
1987-09-01	Astro Pegasus	South Korea	42510/75	Iranian w/s g/f	damaged	
1987-09-01	Bigorange XIV	Panama	197/56	Iraqi a/c	sunk	
1987-09-01	Munguia	Spain	140277/77	Iranian PG	set afire	
1987-09-01	Star Ray	Cyprus	99011/70	Iraqi missile	damaged	
1987-09-02	Nisshin Maru	Japan	103099/80	Iranian PG	damaged	
1987-09-02	Dafni	Greece	48473/57	Iranian boats	set afire	
1987-09-02	Diamond Marine	Liberia	101416/74	Iranian boats	holed	
1987-09-02	Jolly Rubino	Italy	19418/78	Iranian boats	minor damage	
1987-09-02	Leonidas Glory	Cyprus	3717/73	Iranian boats	minor damage	
1987-09-09	Haven	Cyprus	109700/73	Iranian PG	damaged	
1987-09-20	Khark 2	Iran	137895/70	Iraqi a/c	damaged	
1987-09-20	Petroship B	Saudi Arabia	25614/75	Iranian PG	minor damage	
1987-09-20	Shirvan	Iran	41439/79	Iraqi a/c	damaged	
1987-09-21	Gentle Breeze	British Hong Kong	57462/70	Iranian PG	severe damage	
1987-09-21	Marissa I	Panama	181/69	Iranian mine	sunk	
1987-09-27	Coral Cape	Cyprus	112825/74	Iraqi missile (2)	damaged	
1987-09-27	Iran Sepah	Iran	19702/76	Iraqi a/c	damaged	
1987-09-27	Merlin	Cyprus	110037/71	Iraqi missile (2)	damaged	
1987-09-27	Shirvan	Iran	41439/79	Iraqi missile	damaged	
1987-09-29	Khark	Iran	127453/73	Iraqi a/c	damaged	
1987-09-29	Koriana	Greece	38629/85	Iranian w/s	slight damage	
1987-09-30	Western City	Liberia	105803/75	Iranian PGs	minor damage	
1987-10-01	Nichiharu Maru	Japan	120694/73	Iranian PGs	minor damage	
1987-10-01	Johar	Pakistan	49635/76	Iranian PGs	minor damage	
1987-10-01	Shenton Bluff	Australia	150/79	Iraqi missile	severe damage	
1987-10-02	Felicity	Cyprus	53226/68	Iraqi missile	set afire	
1987-10-02	Spic Emerald	India	11712/83	Iranian PG	set afire	
1987-10-05	Brazil Star	Panama	77294/72	Iraqi a/c	minor damage	
1987-10-05	Seawise Giant	Liberia	238558/76	Iraqi a/c	minor damage	
1987-10-05	Shining Star	Cyprus	128929/71	Iraqi missile	severe damage	
1987-10-05	World Admiral	Liberia	106673/74	Iraqi missile	minor damage	
1987-10-08	Tomoe 8	Panama	5267/86	Iranian PG	set afire	
1987-10-10	Rova	Liberia	105286/75	Iraqi missiles	severe damage	
1987-10-12	Marianthi M.	Panama	13006/65	Iraqi missile	damaged	
1987-10-13	Atlantic Peace	Liberia	43943/83	Iranian PG g/f	minor damage	
1987-10-14	Pegasus I	Liberia	104918/73	Iraqi a/c	damaged	
1987-10-15	Sungari	Liberia	124085/75	Iranian missile	set afire	
1987-10-16	Sea Isle City	United States	55454/81	Iranian missile	moderate damage	
1987-10-23	Prosperventure L.	Panama	27333/87	Iranian PG	set afire	
1987-11-04	Taftan	Iran	141883/73	Iraqi a/c	damaged	
1987-11-06	Grand Wisdom	Panama	51121/76	Iranian w/s	minor damage	
1987-11-11	Fortuneship L.	Greece	118216/75	Iraqi GM (3)	damaged	
1987-11-11	Liquid Bulk Explorer	Panama	7060/72	Iranian PG	slight damage	
1987-11-12	Yousef (Note: tug)	Iran	584/84	Iraqi a/c	hit	
1987-11-13	Salvital (Note: salvage tug)	Singapore	742/76	Iraqi GM	severe damage	
1987-11-15	Lucy	Liberia	36512/86	Iranian PG	damaged	
1987-11-16	Esso Freeport	Bahamas	122967/74	Iranian PGs	minor damage	
1987-11-16	Filikon L.	Greece	41330/76	Iranian PGs	moderate damage	
1987-11-19	Salvenus	Singapore	699/78	Iraqi GMs	severe damage	
1987-11-20	Tabriz	Iran	41440/80	Iraqi a/c	damaged	
1987-11-22	Andromeda	Greece	38627/84	Iranian PG	damaged	
1987-11-23	Fundulea	Romania	6253/80	Iranian PGs	damaged	
1987-11-23	Uni-Master	Panama	11648/77	Iranian w/s	slight damage	
1987-11-26	Umm al Jathathel	Kuwait	47169/83	Iranian w/s	Unknown	
1987-11-29	Khark 4	Iran	127450/73	Iraqi a/c	moderate damage	
1987-12-02	Anax	Cyprus	122936/72	Iraqi a/c	slight damage	
1987-12-04	Actinia	Cyprus	109567/75	Iraqi a/c	severe damage	
1987-12-06	Estelle Mærsk	Denmark	28010/87	Iranian PGs	minor damage	
1987-12-06	Norman Atlantic	Singapore	42093/73	Iranian PGs	sunk	
1987-12-08	Alamoot	Iran	163173/77	Iraqi a/c	severe damage	
1987-12-09	Susangird	Iran	111287/73	Iraqi a/c	severe damage	
1987-12-11	Tharaleos	Greece	51372/69	Iranian FF	minor damage	
1987-12-12	Pivot	Cyprus	109700/75	Iranian FF	damaged	
1987-12-15	Mimi M.	Cyprus	16246/74	Iraqi a/c	severe damage	
1987-12-16	Taftan	Iran	141883/73	Iraqi a/c	minor damage	
1987-12-16	World Produce	Greece	17277/84	Iranian PG	moderate damage	
1987-12-17	Island Transporter	Maldives	9714/68	Iranian PGs	damaged	
1987-12-18	Free Enterprise	Malta	113780/72	Iraqi a/c	went aground	
1987-12-18	Happy Kari	Norway	140227/74	Iranian PGs	set afire	
1987-12-18	Saudi Splendour	Liberia	125394/75	Iranian PG	moderate damage	
1987-12-19	Karama Mærsk	Denmark	167728/77	Iranian PGs	slight damage	
1987-12-22	British Respect	Gibraltar	136601/74	Iraqi a/c	set afire	
1987-12-22	Burmah Enterprise	Bermuda	231629/78	Iraqi a/c	severe damage	
1987-12-22	Seawise Giant	Liberia	238558/76	Iraqi a/c	set afire	
1987-12-22	World Petrobras	Liberia	193778/77	Iraqi a/c	damaged	
1987-12-22	Stena Concordia	Liberia	122199/73	Iranian FF	damaged	
1987-12-23	Berge Big	Norway	136364/75	Iranian PGs	set afire	
1987-12-25	Hyundai No. 7	South Korea	11686/78	Iranian PGs	set afire	
1987-12-25	Nejmat el Petrol	Saudi Arabia	12964/64	Iranian PGs	set afire	
1987-12-27	Stilikon	Panama	96747/64	Iraqi GM	set afire	
1987-12-31	Iran Sedaghat	Iran	4474/71	Iraqi a/c	decoy	

=== 1988 ===
1988-01-01 to 1988-03-27
Date	Vessel attacked			Agent	Result	Ref
Date	Name	Flag	GRT/Date	Agent	Result	Ref
1988-01-01	Alga	Malta	16134/72	Iraqi GM	slight damage	
1988-01-10	Khark 3	Iran	137895/71	Iraqi a/c	minor damage	
1988-01-12	United Venture	Cyprus	13161/69	Iranian GM	severe damage	
1988-01-14	Petrobulk Pioneer	Liberia	20446/80	Iranian w/s	damaged aft	
1988-01-15	Atlantic Charisma	Liberia	23127/87	Iranian w/s	damaged	
1988-01-15	Igloo Espoo	Norway	10105/85	Iranian PGs	damaged	
1988-01-16	Rainbow	Liberia	7589/82	Iranian PGs	severe damage	
1988-01-22	Havpil (Note: hit in error)	Singapore	10977/69	Iranian PG	minor damage	
1988-01-22	Topaz	Panama	85690/76	Iranian PGs	minor damage	
1988-01-22	Torm Rottina	Denmark	20036/76	Iranian PGs	attacked	
1988-01-27	Coral Cape	Cyprus	112825/74	Iraqi imissile	damaged	
1988-01-29	Khark	Iran	116404/75	Iraqi a/c	minor damage	
1988-01-29	Khark 5	Iran	138394/75	Iraqi a/c	minor damage	
1988-01-30	Mare	Panama	9111/72	Iranian PGs	sunk	
1988-02-03	Makran	Iran	16000/74	Iraqi missile	set afire	
1988-02-03	Petrobulk Ruler	Norway	20505/75	Iranian PG	damaged	
1988-02-05	Tavistock	Panama	87464/71	Iranian PGs	damaged	
1988-02-07	Khark 5	Iran	138394/75	Iraqi a/c	set afire	
1988-02-07	Diane	Liberia	38241/87	Iranian FF	set afire	
1988-02-09	Shir Kooh	Iran	140465/73	Iraqi a/c	damaged	
1988-02-09	Veronique	Liberia	38795/76	Iranian FF	damaged aft	
1988-02-11	Happy Kari	Norway	38795/76	Iranian PGs	set afire	
1988-02-12	Kate Mærsk	Denmark	167207/76	Iraqi a/c	set afire	
1988-02-15	Soleiman	Iran	1019/84	Iraqi a/c	severe damage	
1988-03-08	Tenacity	Malta	41195/65	Iraqi a/c	minor damage	
1988-03-15	Trade Fortitude	Liberia	113950/72	Iraqi a/c	damaged	
1988-03-18	Berge Lord	Norway	138008/73	Iranian PGs	minor damage	
1988-03-18	Kyrnicos	Cyprus	41922/67	Iraqi a/c	moderate damage	
1988-03-18	Maria 2	Panama	22845/80	Iranian PGs	set afire	
1988-03-18	Neptune Subaru	Singapore	22845/80	Iranian PGs	minor damage	
1988-03-19	Avaj	Iran	162028/75	Iraqi a/c	severe damage	
1988-03-19	Sanandaj	Iran	129770/73	Iraqi a/c	severe damage	
1988-03-20	Atlantic Peace	Liberia	43943/83	Iranian PGs	minor damage	
1988-03-21	Fumi	Liberia	36674/84	Iranian PGs	set afire	
1988-03-21	Iberian Reefer	Spain	7949/85	Iranian PGs	minor damage	
1988-03-22	Havglimt	Singapore	28941/78	Iranian w/s	minor damage	
1988-03-22	Stavros G.L.	Greece	163810/76	Iranian PGs	set afire	
1988-03-23	Odysseas H.	Cyprus	18876/72	Iranian PGs	severe damage	
1988-03-27	Jainarayan Vyas	India	15035/75	Iranian PGs	moderate damage	

1988-03-28 to 1988-08-04
Date	Vessel attacked			Agent	Result	Ref
Date	Name	Flag	GRT/Date	Agent	Result	Ref
1988-03-28	Karama Mærsk	Denmark	167728/77	Iranian PGs	minor damage	
1988-03-28	Golar Kansai	Liberia	98905/72	Iranian PGs	minor damage	
1988-03-30	Anax	Cyprus	122936/72	Iraqi a/c	disabled	
1988-03-31	Haven	Cyprus	109700/73	Iraqi FF	aground	
1988-04-12	Sagheera	Saudi Arabia	20817/81	Iranian PGs	set afire	
1988-04-18	Omnium Pride	Cyprus	13858/71	Iranian PGs	set afire	
1988-04-18	Willi Tide	United States	283/79	Iran	attacked	
1988-04-18	York Marine	British Hong Kong	60814/75	Iranian w/s	set afire	
1988-04-19	Fal V	United Arab Emirates	7214/72	Iranian PGs	damaged	
1988-04-24	Sea Trader	Liberia	19482/76	Iranian PGs	minor damage	
1988-05-11	Khark	Iran	116404/75	Iraqi a/c	damaged	
1988-05-11	Iran Nahad	Iran	11205/70	Iraqi a/c	severe damage	
1988-05-12	Sea Sapphire (Note: tug towing Iran Nahad)	Panama	11205/70	Iraqi a/c	severe damage	
1988-05-14	Argosy	Cyprus	71080/70	Iraqi a/c	severe damage	
1988-05-14	Barcelona	Spain	122770/72	Iraqi a/c	severe damage	
1988-05-14	Beaufort (Note: tugs damaged by explosion of Barcelona)	Belgium	475/78	Iraqi a/c	severe damage	
1988-05-14	Safir	Belgium	475/78	Iraqi a/c	severe damage	
1988-05-14	Scan Partner	Panama	499/79	Iraqi a/c	sunk	
1988-05-14	Seawise Giant	Liberia	238558/79	Iraqi a/c	severe damage	
1988-05-14	Burmah Endeavour	Bahamas	231269/77	Iraqi a/c	minor damage	
1988-05-16	Bisoton	Iran	112445/72	Iraqi a/c	minor damage	
1988-05-18	Ace Chemi	Panama	112445/72	Iranian PGs	set afire	
1988-05-19	Barge Strand	Norway	43849/82	Iranian PGs	minor damage	
1988-05-26	Mundogas Rio	Liberia	12251/67	Iranian PGs	damaged	
1988-05-26	Don Miguel	Malta	10526/76	Iranian PGs	damaged	
1988-06-04	Shoush	Iran	113788/72	Iraqi a/c	Unknown	
1988-06-09	Salverve	Singapore	742/76	Iraqi a/c	damaged	
1988-06-11	Dhaulagiri	West Germany	7895/82	Iranian PGs	minor damage	
1988-06-11	Esso Demetia	United Kingdom	125293/73	Iranian PGs	minor damage	
1988-06-11	Iran Fallahi	Iran	17716/72	Iraq a/c	Unknown	
1988-06-14	Neptune Subaru	Singapore	51894/86	Iranian PGs	moderate damage	
1988-07-01	Khark 4	Iran	127450/73	Iraqi a/c	damaged	
1988-07-01	Fortuneship L	Greece	118216/75	Iraqi a/c	damaged	
1988-07-03	Berge Strand	Norway	43849/82	Iranian PGs	minor damage	
1988-07-07	Fellowship L	Greece	118215/74	Iraqi a/c	set afire	
1988-07-08	Star Ray	Cyprus	107432/70	Iraqi a/c	set afire	
1988-07-12	Universal Monarch	Panama	40840/81	Iranian PGs	damaged	
1988-07-15	Sea Victory	Liberia	43456/69	Iranian PGs	minor damage	
1988-08-04	Berge Lord	Norway	138008/73	Iranian PGs	minor damage	

== See also ==
- East-West Crude Oil Pipeline
