= Operation Nimble Archer =

1987 US attack on Iranian oil platforms in the Iran-Iraq War

- Part of Iran–Iraq War, Operation Earnest Will
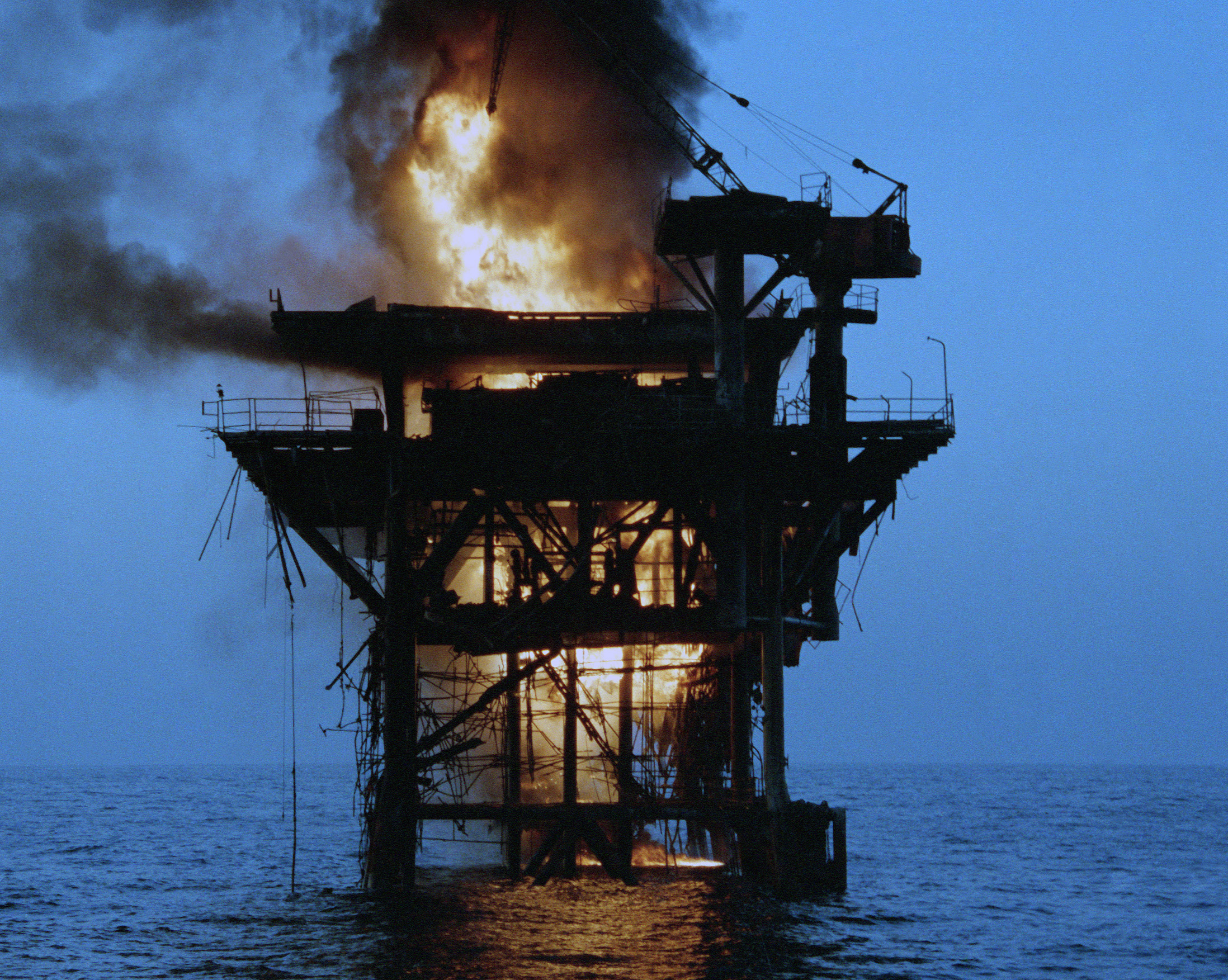
- An Iranian oil platform set ablaze after shelling by American destroyers
- Location: Persian Gulf
- Commanded by: United States
- Target: Two Iranian oil platforms (Resalat and Reshadat)
- Date: 19 October 1987
- Executed by: United States Navy: 6 warships, 3 aircraft
- Outcome: American victory: Oil platforms destroyed
- Casualties: None

Operation Nimble Archer was the 19 October 1987 attack on two Iranian oil platforms in the Persian Gulf by United States Navy forces. The attack was a response to Iran's missile attack on MV Sea Isle City, a reflagged Kuwaiti oil tanker at anchor off Kuwait, which had occurred three days earlier. The action occurred during Operation Earnest Will, the effort to protect Kuwaiti shipping amid the Iran–Iraq War.

Iran subsequently filed a lawsuit against the United States for reparations at the International Court of Justice. The Court ruled, by 14 votes to two, that the retaliatory attacks by the U.S. Navy against certain Iranian oil platforms in the Persian Gulf in 1987 and 1988 constituted an unlawful use of force but did not violate 1955 Treaty of Amity.

== Operation ==
On 16 October, Sea Isle City was in Kuwaiti waters, waiting to be loaded. It had been escorted there by U.S. warships, but was not under their protection at the time. An Iranian Silkworm missile launched from the Iranian-occupied Al-Faw Peninsula hit the ship's wheel house and crew quarters, blinding its master, a U.S. citizen, and wounding 18 crew members. The damage to the ship would take four months to repair.

In retaliation, U.S. officials decided to attack two platforms in the Rashadat oil field, named Rostam oil field before 1979. Having been damaged by Iraq a year earlier, the platforms were not producing oil but had been used by the Iranian Revolutionary Guard Corps for military purposes.

Twenty minutes before the surface action group opened fire, USS Thach radioed the platforms, telling the crews to abandon them. At 2 pm, four U.S. destroyers opened fire: USS Hoel, USS Leftwich, USS Kidd, and USS John Young. One platform was boarded by U.S. special forces, who recovered teletype messages and other documents, then planted explosives to destroy the platform. Air cover was provided by the cruisers USS Long Beach, USS Gridley and USS William H. Standley, two F-14 Tomcat fighters and an E-2 Hawkeye from USS Ranger. The high-explosive shells did negligible blast damage to the steel-lattice platforms, but eventually set them ablaze.

The approximate location of the platforms and the operation

U.S. officials said the platforms were being used by Iranian forces as command-and-control posts with radars to track shipping in the area and communications gear to relay messages between the mainland and Iranian forces operating near the platforms. U.S. Defense Secretary Caspar W. Weinberger said Iran used the facility to "launch small boat attacks against nonbelligerent shipping." U.S. President Ronald Reagan called the operation "an appropriate and proportionate response" to the Silkworm strike. When asked by reporters if the situation constituted a state of war, Reagan replied: "No, we're not going to have a war with Iran: they're not that stupid."

== International Court of Justice case ==
On 2 November 1992 Iran filed a suit with the International Court of Justice, a legal salvo that began a decade of claims and counter-claims by the United States and Iran. On 6 November 2003 the International Court of Justice ruled that the use of force against Iranian oil platforms was not justifiable as self-defense under international law: "the actions of the United States of America against Iranian oil platforms on 19 October 1987 (Operation Nimble Archer) and 18 April 1988 (Operation Praying Mantis) cannot be justified as measures necessary to protect the essential security interests of the United States of America."

The Court also ruled that it "cannot however uphold the submission of the Islamic Republic of Iran that those actions constitute a breach of the obligations of the United States of America under Article X, paragraph 1, of the Treaty of Amity, Economic Relations, and Consular Rights Between the United States of America and Iran, regarding freedom of commerce between the territories of the parties, and that, accordingly, the claim of the Islamic Republic of Iran for reparation also cannot be upheld".

== See also ==
- Bridgeton incident
- Iran–Iraq War
- Operation Prime Chance
- Operation Praying Mantis
