= USS Hawes =

Perry-class frigate of the US Navy

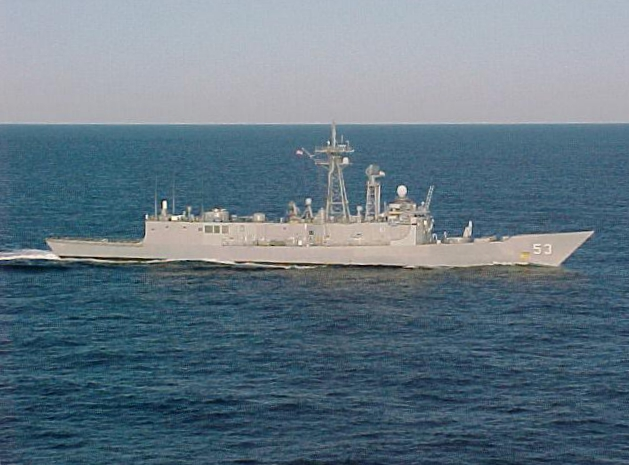
- USS Hawes (FFG-53)

History

United States
- Name: Hawes
- Namesake: Rear admiral Richard E. Hawes
- Awarded: 22 May 1981
- Builder: Bath Iron Works, Bath, Maine
- Laid down: 26 August 1983
- Launched: 18 February 1984
- Sponsored by: Mrs. Ruth Hawes Watson
- Commissioned: 9 February 1985
- Decommissioned: 10 December 2010
- Home port: Norfolk, Virginia
- Identification: Hull symbol:FFG-53; Code letters:NREH
- Motto: "Ever Ready, Ever Fearless"
- Fate: Scrapped in Brownsville 2021

General characteristics
- Class & type: Oliver Hazard Perry-class frigate
- Displacement: 4,100 long tons (4,200 t), full load
- Length: 453 feet (138 m), overall
- Beam: 45 feet (14 m)
- Draught: 22 feet (6.7 m)
- Propulsion: 2 × General Electric LM2500-30 gas turbines generating 41,000 shp (31 MW) through a single shaft and variable pitch propeller; 2 × Auxiliary Propulsion Units, 350 hp (260 kW) retractable electric azimuth thrusters for maneuvering and docking.
- Speed: over 29 knots (54 km/h)
- Range: 5,000 nautical miles at 18 knots (9,300 km at 33 km/h)
- Complement: 15 officers and 190 enlisted, plus SH-60 LAMPS detachment of roughly six officer pilots and 15 enlisted maintainers
- Sensors & processing systems: AN/SPS-49 air-search radar; AN/SPS-55 surface-search radar; CAS and STIR fire-control radar; AN/SQS-56 sonar.
- Electronic warfare & decoys: AN/SLQ-32
- Armament: As built: 1 × OTO Melara Mk 75 76 mm/62 caliber naval gun; 2 × Mk 32 triple-tube (324 mm) launchers for Mark 46 torpedoes; 1 × Vulcan Phalanx CIWS; 4 × .50-cal (12.7 mm) machine guns.; 1 × Mk 13 Mod 4 single-arm launcher for Harpoon anti-ship missiles and SM-1MR Standard anti-ship/air missiles (40 round magazine); Note: As of 2004, Mk 13 systems removed from all active US vessels of this class.Mark 13 launcher was removed from Hawes in 2004.
- Aircraft carried: 2 × SH-60 LAMPS III helicopters
- Aviation facilities: 2 × hangars; RAST helicopter hauldown system

USS Hawes (FFG-53) was a later model Oliver Hazard Perry-class guided missile frigate. She was named for Rear admiral Richard E. Hawes (1894–1968) who was twice decorated with the Navy Cross for submarine salvage operations.

== Construction ==
The contract to build Hawes was awarded to Bath Iron Works, Bath, Maine, 22 May 1981, and her keel was laid 26 August 1983. She was launched 18 February 1984; sponsored by Mrs. Ruth H. Watson, daughter of the late Rear Adm. Hawes; delivered 1 February 1985, and commissioned 9 February 1985.

== Service history ==
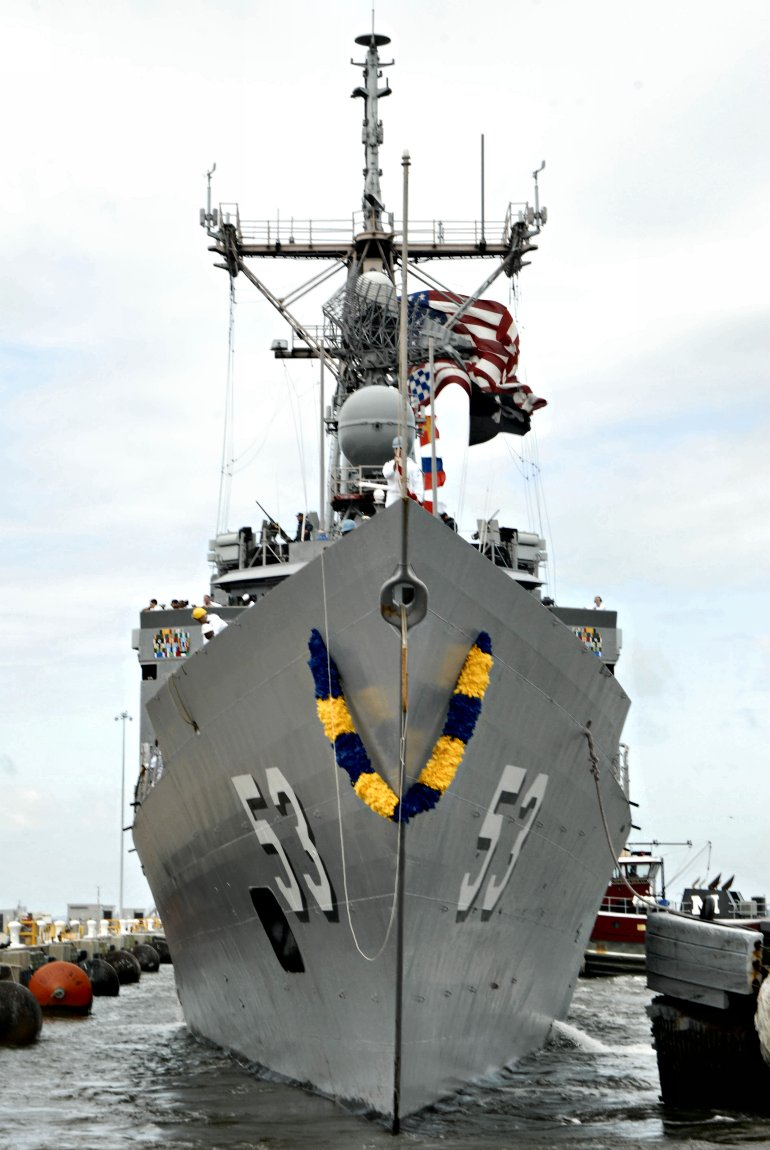
USS Hawes (FFG 53) arrives at Naval Station Norfolk, 7 October 2009, after a six-month deployment in the Caribbean and western Atlantic Ocean supporting Operation Carib Venture. The jolly roger, that RADM Hawes designed can be seen

In the summer of 1987, Hawes deployed from a regular Sixth Fleet assignment in the Mediterranean to the Fifth Fleet in Persian Gulf to support Operation Earnest Will. Operation Earnest Will escorted reflagged Kuwaiti oil and natural gas tankers through the Persian Gulf during the Iran-Iraq War. Hawes led or participated in numerous convoy escort operations between September and November, 1987. In addition to its regular complement of crew, officers and an air detachment of 2 SH-60B Seahawk helicopters, Hawes also embarked a detachment of 3 Task Force 160 (Delta Force) MH-6 helicopters, referred to as Sea Bats, as well as Stinger Missile crews for additional anti-air defense in the wake of the Iraqi attack on the USS Stark in May 1987.

In late September 1987 a small Iranian Revolutionary Guard ship, the Iran Ajr, was discovered sowing mines in shipping lanes northeast of Bahrain and was subsequently attacked by elements of Task Force 160 embarked on the USS Jarrett and captured by a US Navy SEAL team. Subsequently, the Hawes took the Ajr under tow to an undisclosed location where US Navy EOD sailors scuttled the ship.

Hawes also participated as an anti-air picket in support of Operation Nimble Archer, where US Navy destroyers and cruisers destroyed several Iranian natural gas platforms in response to a missile attack on the reflagged tanker Sea Isle City as she awaited the unloading of cargo at the Kuwait City terminal.

On 12 October 2000, Hawes was involved, along with Donald Cook, in providing repair and logistics support to Cole, shortly after she was attacked in Aden, Yemen. Two al-Qaeda terrorists brought an inflatable Zodiac-type speedboat that carried a bomb alongside guided missile destroyer Cole, while the ship refueled, and detonated their lethal cargo, killing 17 sailors and wounding 42 more. The crewmember's heroic damage control efforts saved Cole. Hawes, Cmdr. J. Scott Jones in command, joined (13 October – October) other ships that took part in Operation Determined Response to assist Cole including: amphibious assault ship Tarawa; dock landing ship Anchorage; amphibious transport dock Duluth; guided missile destroyer Donald Cook; and the Military Sealift Command-operated tug Catawba; along with British frigates Cumberland and Marlborough. The Navy subsequently enhanced global force protection training during crucial transits, and sailors qualified to fire M60 and Browning .50 caliber M2 machine guns to defend against assaults by low-slow flying aircraft and small boats.

Hawes, with Helicopter Antisubmarine Squadron (Light) HSL-48 Detachment 10 embarked, returned from a counter-narcotics deployment to the Caribbean and Western Atlantic to Naval Station Norfolk, Virginia, on 7 October 2009. The ship's operations resulted in the seizure of 200 barrels of cocaine.

In July 2010, Hawes docked for five days at Pier 4 of the Charlestown Navy Yard, participating in a Navy Week coordinated alongside Boston's Harborfest.

Hawes, operating with Destroyer Squadron 26 out of Norfolk, was decommissioned on 10 December 2010

Fate

In late 2020, Hawes was announced to be recycled by 2021, alongside USS Charles F. Adams, USS Stephen Groves, USS Barry, and USS Ticonderoga.
