= Richard E. Hawes =

Officer in the United States Navy (1894–1968)

Richard Ellington Hawes
- Born: February 12, 1894; Thomson, Georgia
- Died: December 30, 1968 (aged 74); Thomson, Georgia
- Military career
- Allegiance: United States
- Branch: United States Navy
- Service years: 1917–1952
- Rank: WWII - Captain upon retirement - Rear Admiral
- Commands: USS Pigeon (ASR-6)
- Conflicts: World War II; *Battle of the Philippines
- Awards: Navy Cross; Bronze Star; Presidential Unit Citation

Richard Ellington Hawes (February 12, 1894 – December 30, 1968) was an officer in the United States Navy who served in World War I and World War II.

== Early life, through World War I ==
Hawes was born in Thomson, Georgia, on February 12, 1894. He attended the University of Georgia on a baseball scholarship before transferring to Mercer University. There he won recognition in both baseball and American football. He earned a law degree along the way, but passed up the bar exam to coach and play professional baseball.

When America entered World War I in 1917, Hawes enlisted in the navy as a fireman second class. Fifteen months later he accepted a temporary appointment as an ensign, but reverted to Boatswain (Warrant Officer) in 1920.

== Interwar service ==
In March 1926 Hawes joined Falcon as Executive Officer. While aboard Falcon he played a key role in the salvage of S-51 off Block Island, R.I. in September 1925. For his part in that difficult and dangerous operation Boatswain Hawes received his first Navy Cross. He also assisted in the salvaging of the submarine S-4, which sank off Provincetown, Massachusetts in December 1927.

On February 18, 1929, Hawes was commissioned an Ensign by a special act of the U.S. Congress in recognition of his services in salvaging the S-51 and S-4.

In January 1940 Lieutenant Hawes assumed command of USS Pigeon and was serving in that role when the United States entered World War II.

== World War II ==
=== Japanese attack on Cavite Navy Yard, the Philippines, December 10, 1941 ===
On December 10, 1941 the Pigeon was docked at the Cavite Navy Yard on Manila Bay for repairs to her steering gear when Japanese warplanes attacked. Since Pearl Harbor three days before, Hawes had main steam pressure up and the full crew aboard, ready to get underway at an instant. Lashed to the minesweeper Quail, which provided steering for both, Pigeon cleared the docks and headed for the relative safety of the bay to dodge the enemy bombs.

By this time Cavite had become a hellish inferno. After separating from Quail Hawes could see that the submarine Seadragon was about to be engulfed by bombs and fire in her berth. Through heavy bombing and strafing, Lieutenant Hawes maneuvered the 187-foot Pigeon back to the flaming dock to haul the helpless submarine stern first from her berth. Another submarine and a minesweeper had just been sunk there by direct hits. The heat and flames were so intense that they blistered the ship's paint, singed off body hair, and melted the brim of Hawes' cap. But Pigeon's crew managed to rig a line on the Seadragon and tow her to safety.

For this heroic action, Hawes received his second Navy Cross and Pigeon was awarded the Presidential Unit Citation, the first warship to receive the award in World War II. Seadragon went on to distinguished service, earning eleven battle stars before the war ended.

Immediately after the attack Hawes found and mounted on his ship two 3-inch guns and twelve .50 caliber machine guns from the wrecked Navy Yard. By the end of December the new "gunboat" had received her second Presidential Unit Citation for shooting down several enemy planes and bombarding enemy troops. She was the only surface warship to win two Presidential Unit Citations in World War II.

=== Later service ===
Hawes was reassigned to command the submarine tender USS Holland (AS-3) in 3 February 1942. Later in the war he would command the submarine rescue ship Chanticleer from 20 November 1942 and the submarine tender Anthedon from 15 September 1944 until January 1945.

Except for the brief periods when he was in transit or putting the submarine rescue ship Chanticleer and the submarine tender Anthedon into commission, Hawes spent virtually all of World War II at sea in the Pacific in command of his three ships. Like Hawes himself, his ships always had a reputation for efficiency and readiness. When he put Chanticleer into commission, he had depth-charge racks installed so he could prosecute Japanese submarines. When he put Anthedon into commission, 92% of his crew were inductees and had never been to sea, but he sailed directly from commissioning to the Pacific war and within two hours of his arrival was servicing submarines. He received the Bronze Star Medal for "undaunted courage and professional skill" for his command of that ship.

As he left the Western Pacific theater in January 1945, the Commander, Submarines, Philippine Sea Frontier sent Anthedon a message of thanks and good wishes, describing Commander Hawes and his men as "ever ready, ever fearless."

Hawes was promoted to captain on March 25, 1945.

== Retirement and later years ==
On December 1, 1952 he was transferred to the retired list and promoted to rear admiral.

Rear Admiral Hawes died at his home in Thomson, Georgia, on December 30, 1968.

== Awards ==
- Navy Cross with gold star
- Bronze Star Medal
- Presidential Unit Citation
- World War I Victory Medal
- American Defense Service Medal
- Asiatic-Pacific Campaign Medal with battle star
- World War II Victory Medal
- National Defense Service Medal
- Philippine Defense Medal with star

== Namesake ==
In 1984, the guided missile frigate USS Hawes was named in honor of RADM Hawes.
