= Farsi Island =

Iranian island in the Persian Gulf

Jazireh-ye Farsi Lighthouse
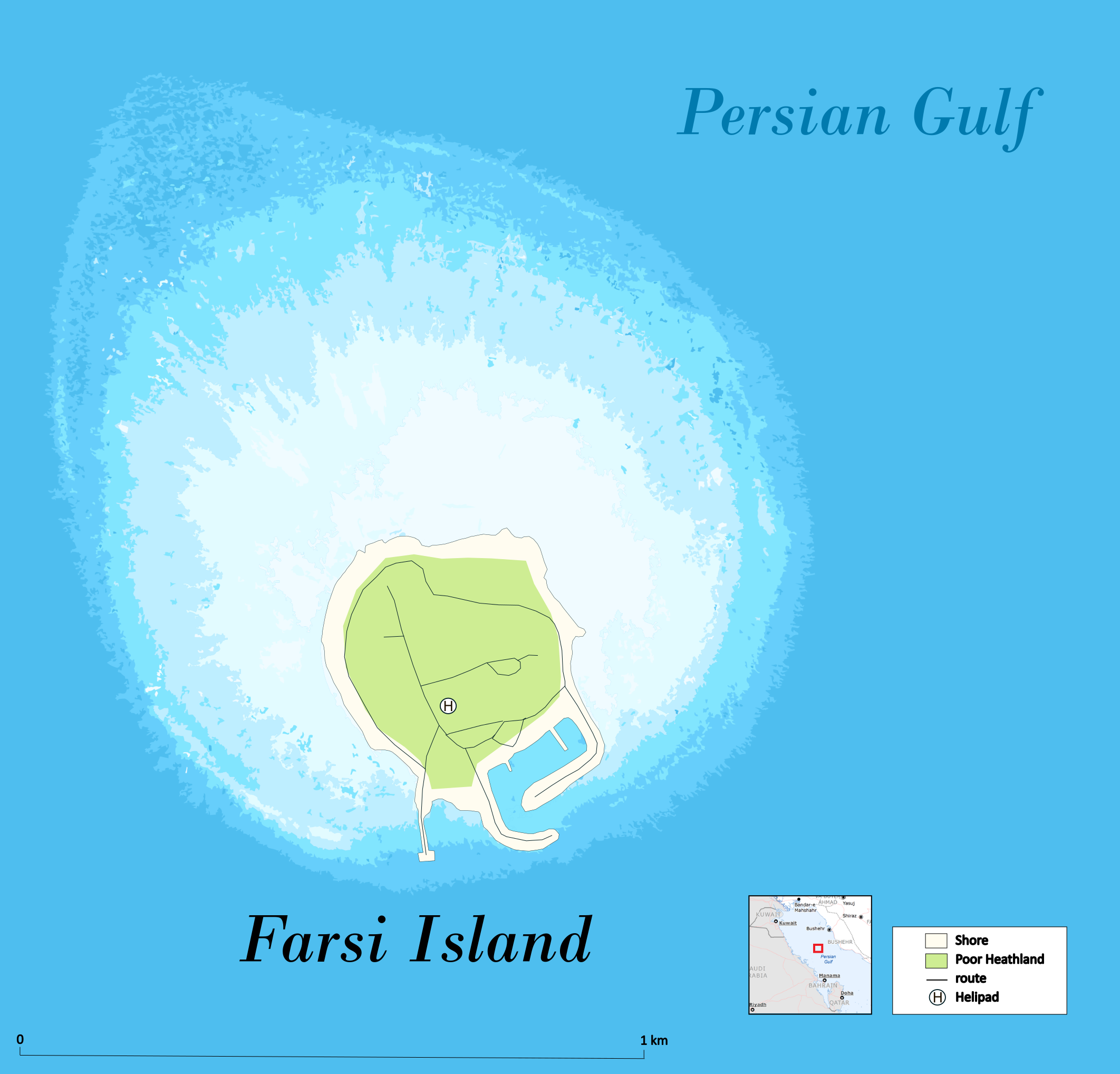
- Farsi island
- Location: Farsi Island, Bushehr Province, Iran
- Coordinates: 27°59′35″N 50°10′21″E

Tower
- Foundation: concrete base
- Construction: metal skeletal tower
- Height: 23 m (75 ft)
- Shape: square pyramidal tower
- Markings: white and black horizontal band tower

Light
- Focal height: 28 m (92 ft)
- Range: 16 nmi (30 km; 18 mi)
- Characteristic: Fl W 15s

Farsi Island (Persian: جزیره فارسی, romanized: jazīre-ye fârsī) is a tiny, barren Iranian island (Bushehr province) in the Persian Gulf. There is an IRGC Navy base on this island. The island has an area of about 0.25 km^{2} (0.10 sq mi) and is restricted from the public. The center of Farsi Island is located at latitude 27° 59' 36" N and longitude 50° 10' 22" E. Its maximum elevation is 4 metres (13 ft). The word Farsi means "Persian".

In the late 1980s, during the "Tanker War" phase of the Iran–Iraq War, the IRGC used speedboats to launch attacks from Farsi Island on vessels of Iraq and its allies, including Kuwait. The United States entered the Persian gulf to protect Kuwaiti oil shipments. Iran planted naval mines near Farsi Island on the route of the first convoy, consisting of US navy vessels escorting the Kuwaiti oil tanker Bridgeton, which hit one of the mines.

On 12 January 2016, Iranian Revolutionary Guards forces stationed on the island apprehended two small vessels and their 10 U.S. Navy sailors after the latter entered Iranian waters. The incident prompted talks between the Iranian Foreign Ministry and the U.S. State Department regarding their release. All 10 sailors and their vessels were released the following morning.

== History ==
=== Iran-Iraq war ===
Farsi Island became an outpost of the Iranian military during the Iran-Iraq war. By 1986 the Iranian Revolutionary Guards established a headquarters on Farsi island, to monitor and harass merchant shipping. In July 1987 a Kuwaiti oil tanker, the Bridgeton, flagged as American, struck a naval mine 22 miles off the coast of Farsi island. At the time of the Bridgeton striking a mine, the Office of Naval Intelligence reported a heightened presence of Iranian small boat activity. Two months later, the US Navy caught the Iran Ajr in the act of laying mines around Farsi island and was promptly boarded and scuttled by US forces.

== See also ==
- List of lighthouses in Iran
- Nader Mahdavi
- 2016 U.S.–Iran naval incident
