= USS Thach =

1982 Oliver Hazard Perry-class frigate

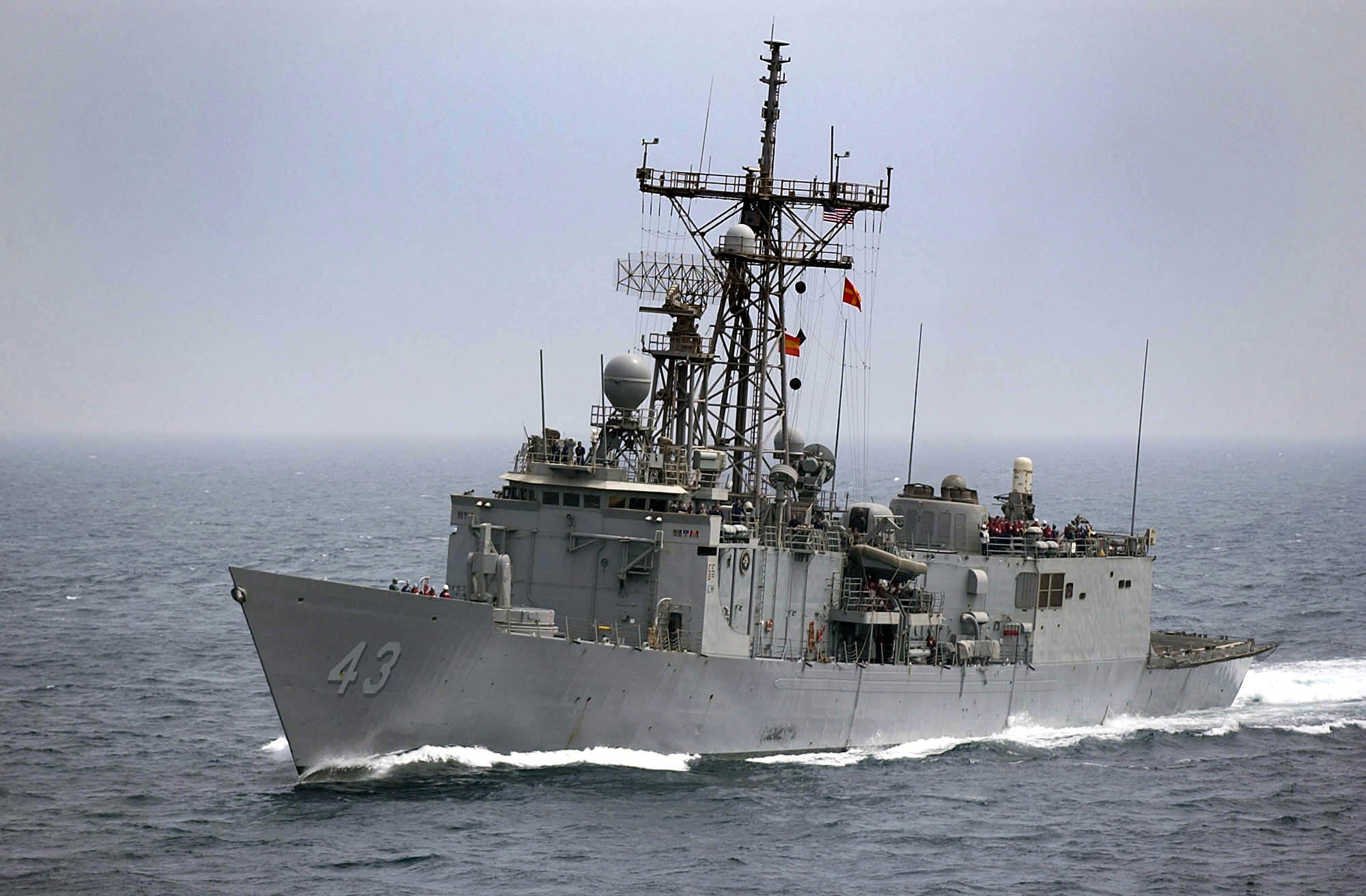
- USS Thach in the Persian Gulf, 2003

History

United States
- Name: Thach
- Namesake: Admiral John Thach
- Awarded: 27 April 1979
- Builder: Todd Pacific Shipyards, Los Angeles Division, San Pedro, California
- Laid down: 6 March 1981
- Launched: 18 December 1982
- Sponsored by: Mrs. Madalyn J. Thach
- Commissioned: 17 March 1984
- Decommissioned: 1 November 2013
- Stricken: 15 November 2013
- Identification: Hull symbol: FFG-43; Code letters: NJST
- Motto: "Ready and Able"
- Fate: Sunk as part of a sinking exercise on 14 July 2016 during RIMPAC 2016.
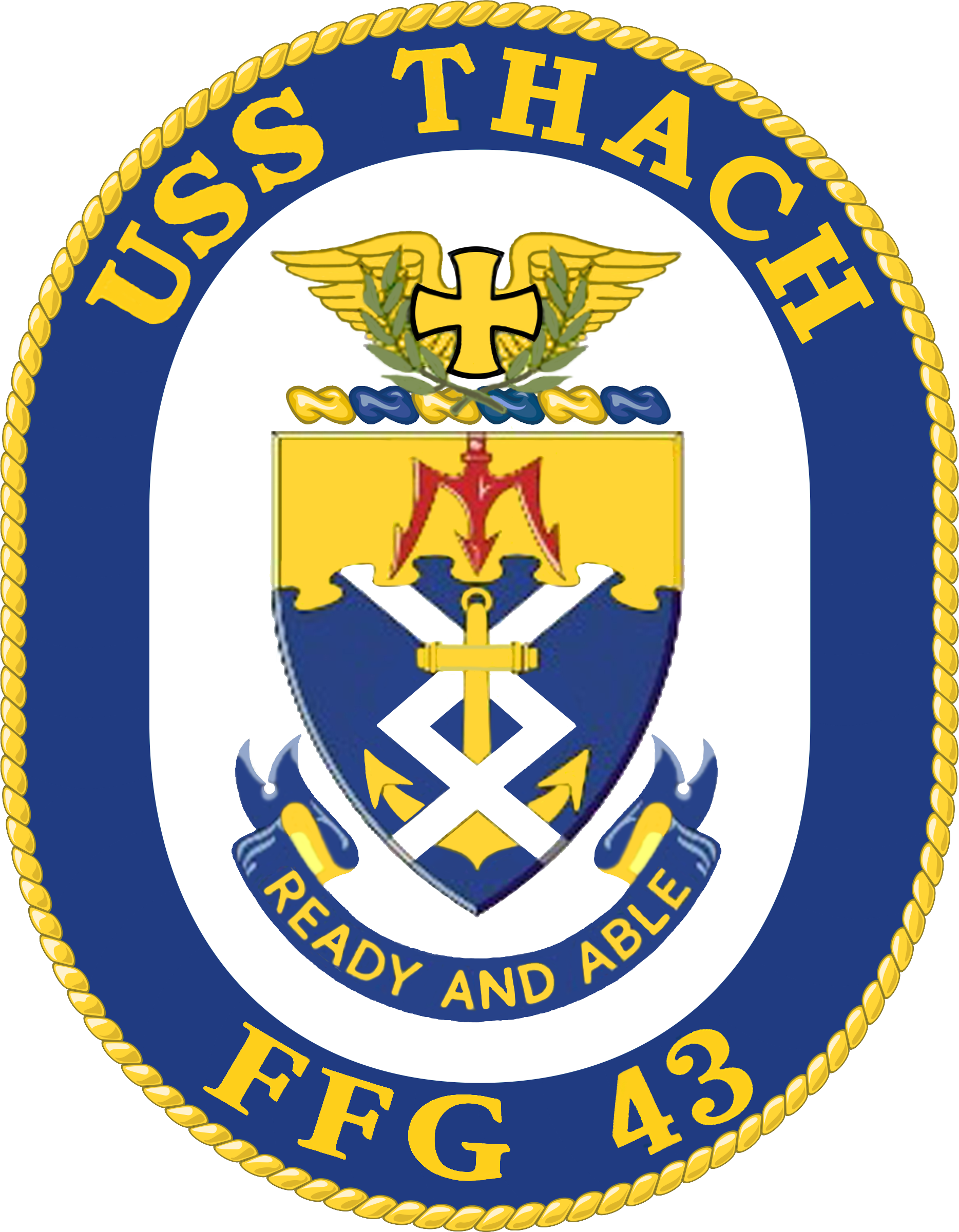
- Badge

General characteristics
- Class & type: Oliver Hazard Perry-class frigate
- Displacement: 4,100 long tons (4,200 t), full load
- Length: 453 feet (138 m), overall
- Beam: 45 feet (14 m)
- Draft: 22 feet (6.7 m)
- Propulsion: 2 × General Electric LM2500-30 gas turbines generating 41,000 shp (31 MW) through a single shaft and variable pitch propeller; 2 × Auxiliary Propulsion Units, 350 hp (260 kW) retractable electric azimuth thrusters for maneuvering and docking.
- Speed: 35 knots
- Range: 5,000 nautical miles at 18 knots (9,300 km at 33 km/h)
- Complement: 15 officers and 190 enlisted, plus SH-60 LAMPS detachment of roughly six officer pilots and 15 enlisted maintainers
- Sensors & processing systems: AN/SPS-49 air-search radar; AN/SPS-55 surface-search radar; CAS and STIR fire-control radar; AN/SQS-56 sonar.; AN/SQR-19 Towed Array Sonar System; AN/SQQ-89 ASW Integration System
- Electronic warfare & decoys: AN/SLQ-32; Mk36 SRBOC Decoy System
- Armament: As built: 1 × OTO Melara Mk 75 76 mm/62 caliber naval gun; 2 × Mk 32 triple-tube (324 mm) launchers for Mark 46 torpedoes; 1 × Vulcan Phalanx CIWS; 4 × .50-cal (12.7 mm) machine guns.; 1 × Mk 13 Mod 4 single-arm launcher for Harpoon anti-ship missiles and SM-1MR Standard anti-ship/air missiles (40 round magazine); Note: As of 2004, Mk 13 systems removed from all active US vessels of this class.
- Aircraft carried: 2 × SH-60 LAMPS III helicopters
- Aviation facilities: 2 × hangars; RAST helicopter hauldown system

USS Thach (FFG-43), an Oliver Hazard Perry-class frigate, was the only ship of the United States Navy named for Admiral John Thach, a Naval Aviator during World War II, who invented the Thach Weave dogfighting tactic.

== Construction and design ==
Thach was laid down on 6 March 1981 by the Todd Pacific Shipyards, Los Angeles Division, San Pedro, California; launched on 18 December 1982; sponsored by Mrs. Madalyn J. Thach, widow of the namesake; and commissioned on 17 March 1984 at Long Beach.

Thach's mission was to provide anti-air, anti-surface, and anti-submarine protection for carrier battle groups, naval expeditionary forces, replenishment groups, convoys, and other military and merchant shipping. The new direction for the naval service remained focused on the ability to project power from the sea in the critical littoral regions for the world.

Success in the warfare environment of the 1990s and beyond required thorough evaluation, rapid decision-making and almost instantaneous response to any postulated threat. The systems aboard Thach were designed to meet these demanding and dynamic prerequisites, and to do so with minimum human interface. The Sikorsky SH-60 Seahawk's video data link system brought state-of-the-art computer technology to the warfare arena, as well as integrating sensors and weapons to provide a total offensive and defensive weapons system.

In addition, computers controlled and monitored the gas turbine engines (the same engines installed on DC-10 aircraft) and electrical generators. Digital electronic logic circuits and remotely operated valves were monitored in Central Control Station which initiated engine start and resulted in a "ready to go" status in less than ten minutes.

== Service history ==
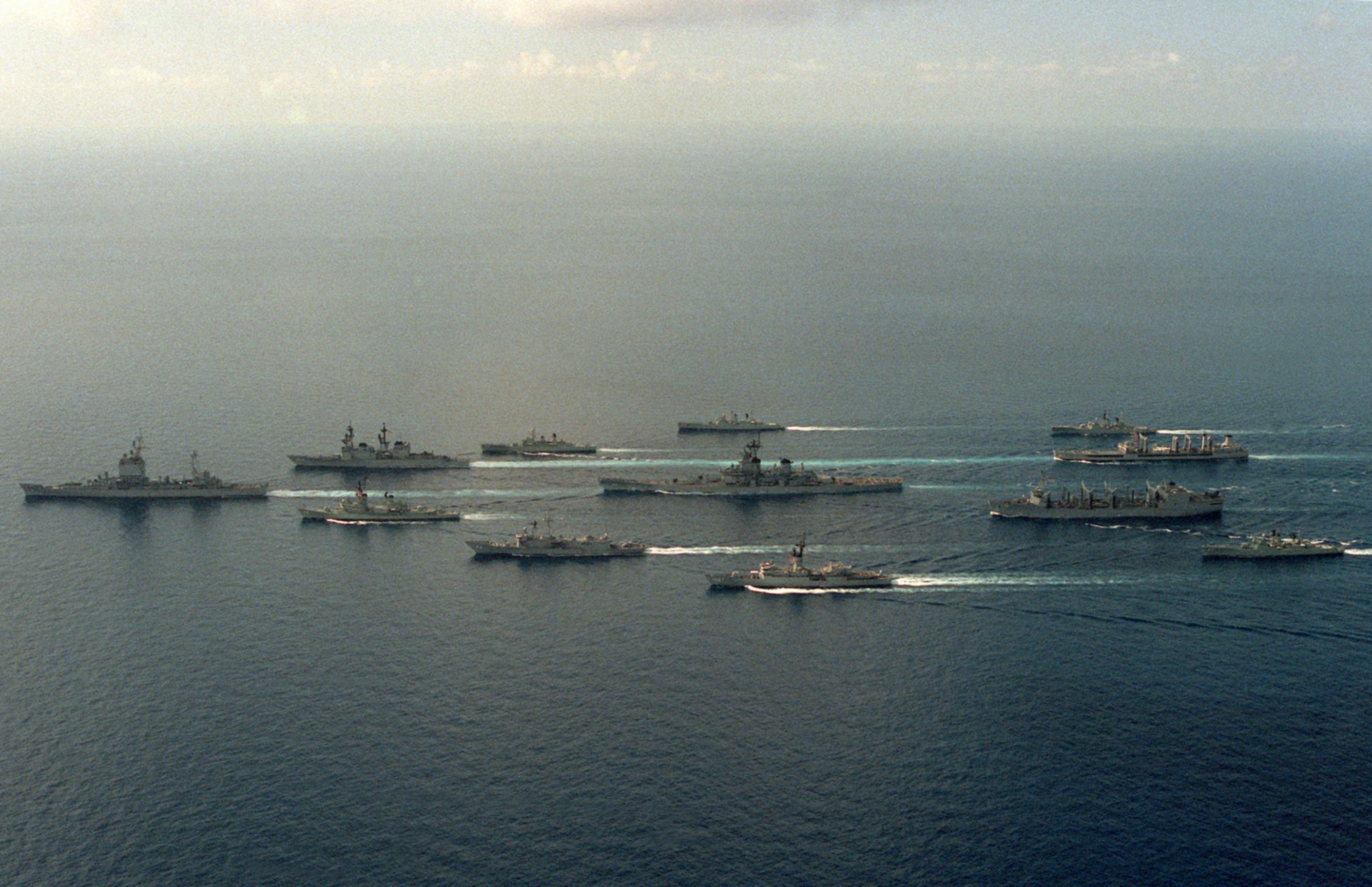
In the New Jersey battle group, the ships accompanying this battle ship are clockwise from left, are USS Long Beach, USS Merrill, HMAS Swan, HMAS Stuart, HMAS Parramatta, USNS Passumpsic, USS Wabash, HMAS Derwent, USS Kirk, USS Thach, and HMAS Hobart, 1 July 1986

In 1986, the ship, part of Destroyer Squadron 21, deployed to the Western Pacific as part of a battleship battle group led by New Jersey.

Thach was the command ship of Operation Nimble Archer, the 19 October 1987 attack on two Iranian oil platforms in the Persian Gulf by United States Navy forces. The attack was a response to Iran's missile attack three days earlier on MV Sea Isle City, a reflagged Kuwaiti oil tanker at anchor off Kuwait. The action occurred during Operation Earnest Will, the effort to protect Kuwaiti shipping amid the Iran–Iraq War.

In late 2006 while deployed to the Southern Pacific, Thach caught fire as she attempted to put out a fire on a drug smuggling ship.

== Fate ==
Thach was decommissioned at Naval Base San Diego on 1 November 2013. The ship was homeported in San Diego and was part of Destroyer Squadron 23. She was sunk on July 14, 2016, during the major naval exercise RIMPAC 2016.

== Crest ==
Like all heraldic Navy insignias, Thach's crest has special meaning. The blue and gold colors are traditionally associated with the Navy; blue for the sea and gold for excellence. The pair of wings in the upper crest refers to Admiral Thach's contributions to naval aviation as a pilot and leader. One of the contributions to naval aviation as a pilot and leader was his invention of the "Thach Weave," symbolized by the interlaced silver chevrons. This two-plane fighter tactic, used to cover each other from enemy fighters, is still used by fighter aircraft today.

The three-pronged trident is shown pointing down from the sky, symbolizing naval aviation's role of projecting power from the sky and the sea. The three tines of the trident also represent Fighting Squadron Three, the unit Admiral Thach commanded during early Pacific carrier battles in World War II. The cross within its outlined border and the wreath refer to Admiral Thach's first and second awards of the Navy Cross and the Navy Distinguished Service Medal.

The anchor in the center of the insignia focused attention on the nautical nature of both Admiral Thach's service to his country. The ship's motto, "Ready and Able", was representative of Admiral Thach's preparation and success.
