= Operation Earnest Will =

1987–88 US operation of the Iran-Iraq War

- Part of the Iran–Iraq War
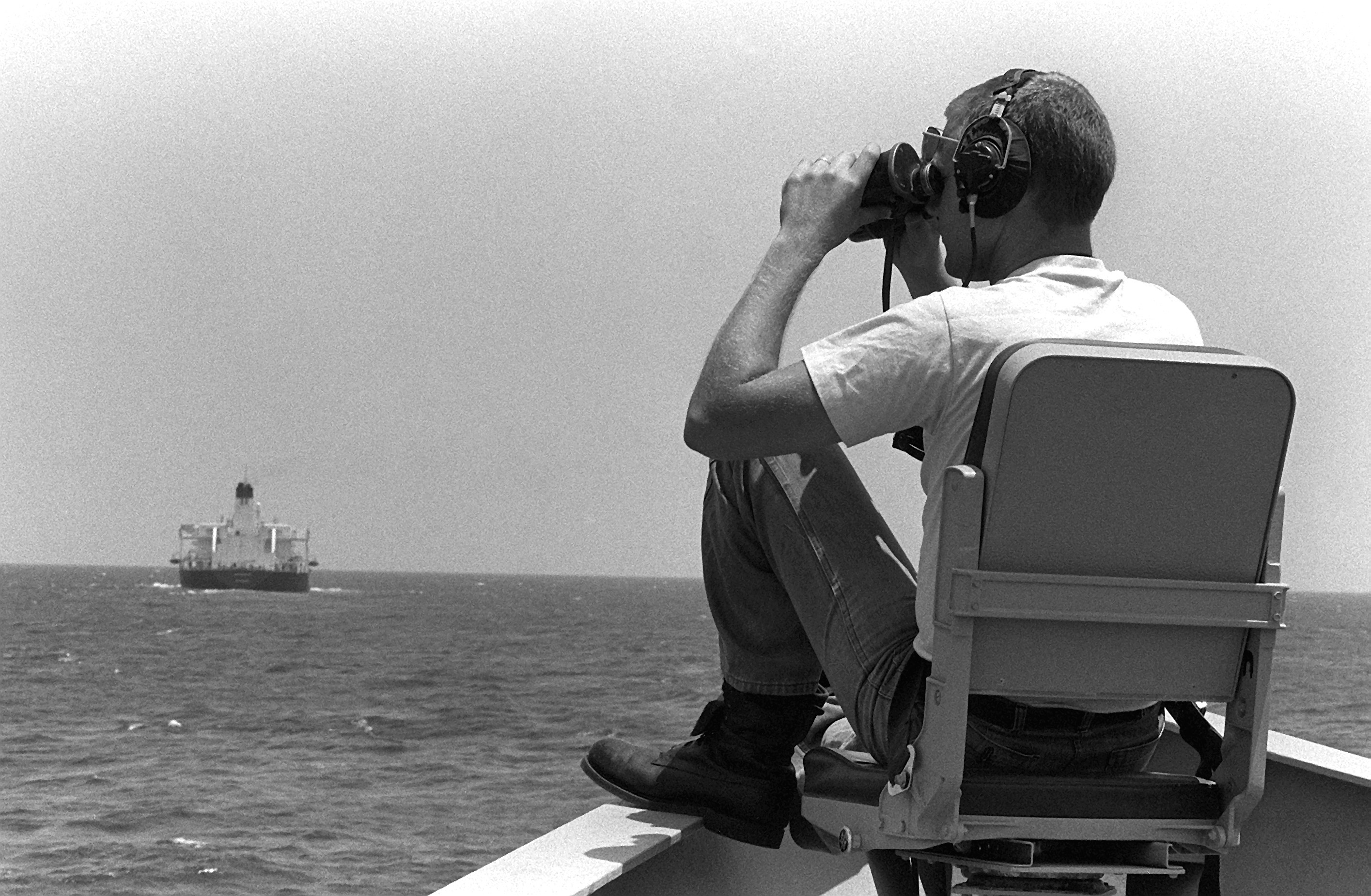
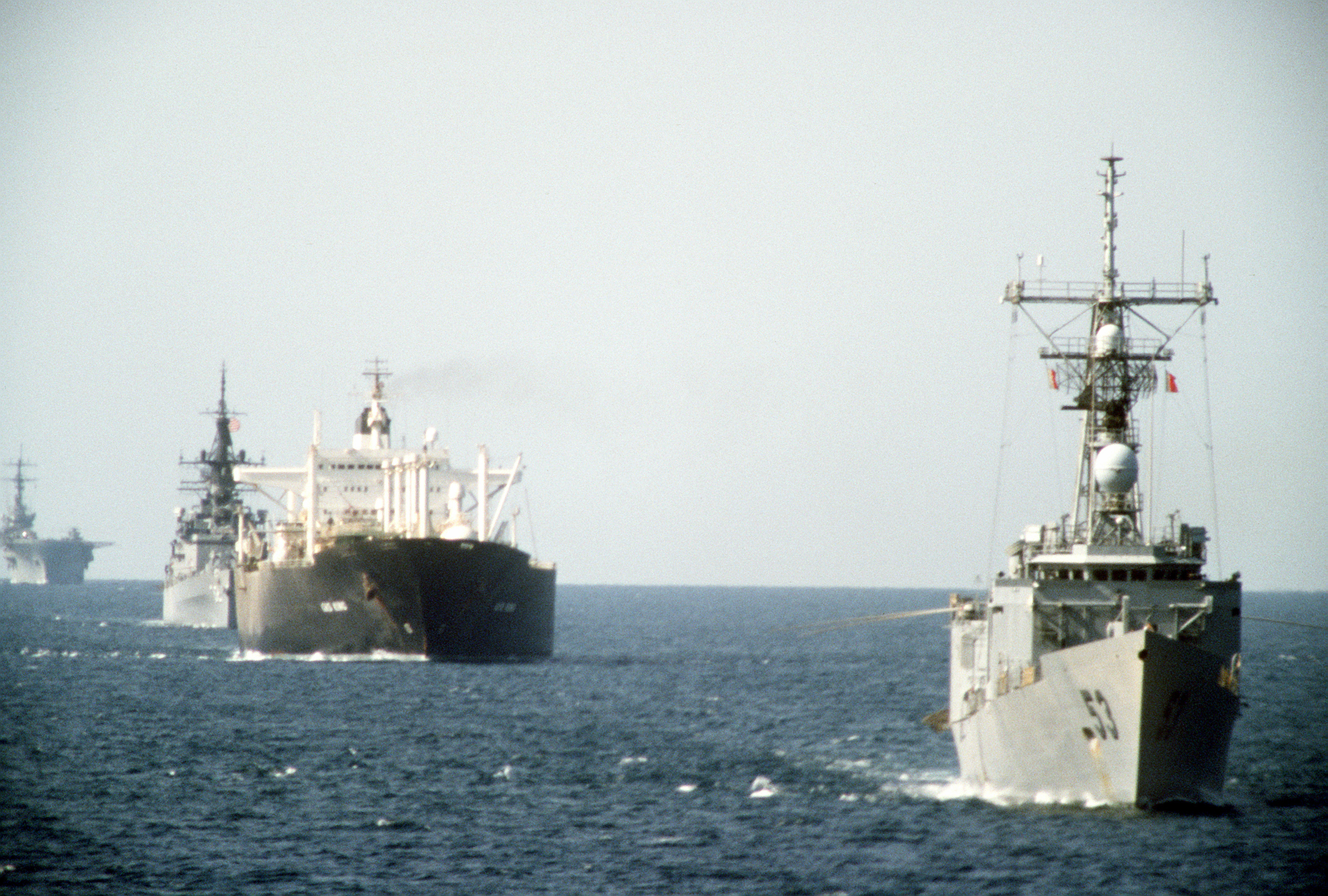
- A US Navy sailor scans for mines from the bow of the guided missile frigate USS Nicholas during an Operation Earnest Will convoy mission, June 1988; Tanker convoy No. 12 under US Navy escort in October 1987
Date	24 July 1987 – 26 September 1988
Location	Persian Gulf

Belligerents
United States; Kuwait; Supported by: France; United Kingdom	Iran

Commanders and leaders
Rear Adm. Harold Bernsen	Mohammad-Hossein Malekzadegan
- U.S. officials decided to attack two platforms in the Rashadat oil field

Operation Earnest Will (24 July 1987 – 26 September 1988) was an American military protection of Kuwaiti-owned tankers from Iranian attacks in 1987 and 1988, three years into the Tanker War phase of the Iran–Iraq War. It was the largest naval convoy operation since World War II, and flowed from Resolution 598 which had been adopted three days earlier.

The U.S. Navy warships that escorted the tankers, part of U.S. Naval Forces Central Command, were the operations' most visible part. U.S. Air Force AWACS radar planes provided surveillance and U.S. Army special-operations helicopters hunted for possible attackers.

Other U.S. Navy vessels participated in Operation Earnest Will. They were then under the command of the U.S. Navy's Seventh Fleet which had primary responsibility for combat operations in the Persian Gulf. The numerous ships used in Operation Earnest Will mostly consisted of Carrier Battle Groups, Surface Action Groups and ships from the Pacific's Third and Seventh Fleets and the Mediterranean-based Sixth Fleet. They generally operated in and near the Persian Gulf for parts of their normal six-month deployments.

It was the first tactical operation of the United States Special Operations Command (USSOCOM) that involved Navy SEALs, Special Boat Units, and 160th Special Operations Aviation Regiment (Airborne) ("Nightstalkers") aviators all working together.

The French Navy also supported Resolution 598, as did the British Navy.

== Background ==
The so-called "Tanker War" phase of the Iran–Iraq War started when Iraq attacked the oil terminal and oil tankers at Iran's Kharg Island in early 1984. Iraq had expanded its air force with new, Exocet-equipped French and Soviet aircraft. Saddam's aim in attacking Iranian shipping was, among other things, to provoke the Iranians to retaliate with extreme measures, such as closing the Strait of Hormuz to all maritime traffic, thereby bringing American intervention. Iran limited the retaliatory attacks to Iraqi shipping, leaving the strait open.

Becoming landlocked after the Battle of al-Faw, and due to the blockade of Iraqi oil pipelines to the Mediterranean Sea by Iran's ally Syria, Iraq had to rely on its ally, Kuwait and other Gulf Arab allies to a lesser extent to transport its oil. After increasing attacks on Iran's main oil export facility at Kharg Island by Iraq, Iran started to attack Kuwaiti tankers carrying Iraqi oil from 13 May 1984, and later attacking tankers from any Gulf state supporting Iraq. Attacks on ships of non-combatant nations in the Persian Gulf sharply increased thereafter, with both nations attacking oil tankers and merchant ships of neutral nations in an effort to deprive their opponent of trade.

Besides concerns about the intensified Tanker War, the superpowers feared that the possible fall of Basra, which was now under threat, might lead to a pro-Iranian Islamic republic in largely Shia-populated southern Iraq. During the first four months of 1987, Kuwait turned to the superpowers, partly to protect oil exports but largely to seek an end to the war through superpower intervention. In December 1986, Kuwait's government asked the Reagan administration to send the U.S. Navy to protect Kuwaiti tankers against Iranian attacks. Although members of both the U.S. House and Senate opposed the reflagging policy, the executive debated this idea and finally agreed to it on 7 March 1987.

While U.S. law [War Powers Resolution] does generally restrict the President's unilateral use or deployment of military forces, the administration and cabinet determined they would be in compliance with the Resolution's requirements while enacting this plan. To justify the significant military utilization, the Kuwaiti ships were re-registered under the U.S. flag for military escort purposes in the region.

The office of Abraham Sofaer, Legal Advisor to the U.S. State Department, ensured that the administration took all steps necessary to satisfiy the international law requirement that reflagging be based on a genuine link between the flag and the vessel at issue. Before Earnest Will formally began, it became clear how dangerous Persian Gulf operations would be. On 17 May 1987, an Iraqi jet fired two Exocet missiles at the guided missile frigate USS Stark, killing 37 sailors and injuring 21. Iraqi officials said that the targeting of the U.S. warship was accidental.

== Operations ==
After the passage of UNSCR 598 on 20 July 1987, the U.S. Navy began Operation Earnest Will at 2:00 a.m. (EDT) on 23 July 1987. USS Crommelin, USS Fox, USS Worden, USS Kidd, and USS Klakring were the first U.S. Navy ships assigned to escort the Kuwaiti oil tankers, under the command of Rear Admiral Harold Bernsen.

=== Bridgeton incident ===
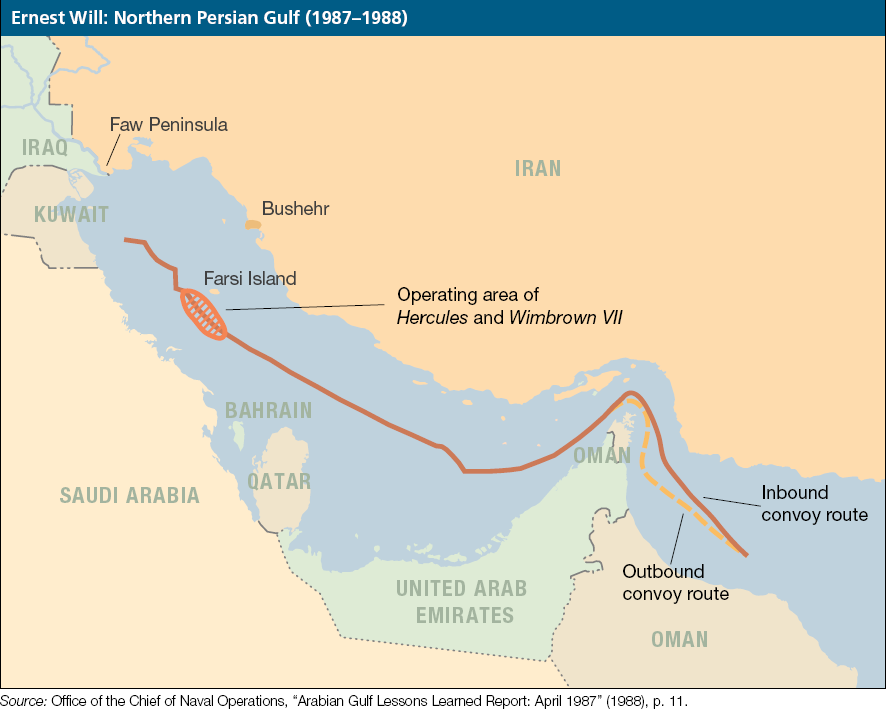
Bridgeton's convoy route and the place it was hit

On the very first escort mission, on 24 July 1987, the Kuwaiti oil tanker al-Rekkah, re-flagged as the U.S. tanker MV Bridgeton and accompanied by US navy warships, struck an Iranian underwater mine planted some 20 miles (32 km) west of Farsi Island the night earlier by a Pasdaran special unit, damaging the ship, but causing no injuries. Bridgeton proceeded under her own power to Kuwait, with the U.S. Navy escorts following behind to avoid mines.

The operation was widely publicized, and American reporters aboard another ship in the convoy immediately issued reports about the incident, claiming it had "played into Iran's plan". Iran's Prime Minister Mir Hossein Mousavi called it an "irreparable blow to America's political and military prestige", and said that it was the "invisible hands [of God]" that hit the US-flagged ship, and expressed hope that the U.S. Congress would put an immediate end to the Administration's plan. The Congress was critical of the re-flagging policy, but still did not have a united position on the issue.

It was an unforeseen development. The commander of the task force admitted that in spite of intelligence warnings, no one had thought it necessary to check the route for naval mines, and it was soon brought out that not only did the U.S. not have any minesweepers in the Persian Gulf, it did not have any easily accessible minesweepers at all, so the escort operation was placed on hold until minesweepers would be available. The Pentagon deployed Helicopter Mine Countermeasures Squadron 14 (HM-14) with eight minesweeping SeaStallion helicopters, five oceangoing minesweepers, and six small coastal minesweepers—dramatically increasing U.S. presence in the Persian Gulf, and increasing the probability of an Iran–U.S. confrontation. U.S. Secretary of Defense Caspar Weinberger indirectly provoked Iran to retaliate.

=== Subsequent operations ===
In the following 14 months, many U.S. warships took up escort duties. At one point, more than 30 warships were in the region to support the operation.

=== Operation Prime Chance ===
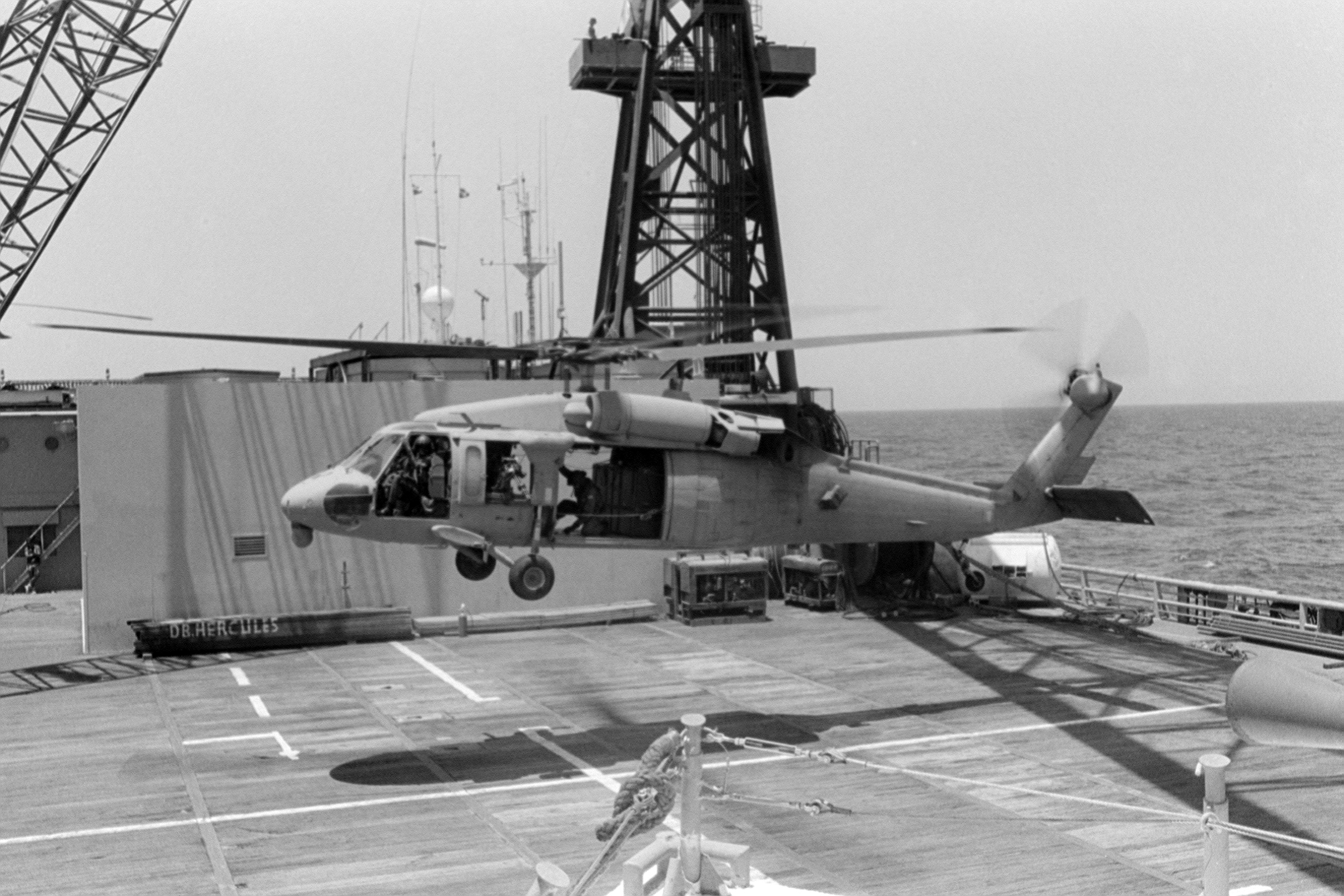
A MH-60 landing on Hercules

Earnest Will overlapped with Operation Prime Chance, a largely secret effort to stop Iranian forces from attacking Persian Gulf shipping. Despite the protection offered by U.S. Navy vessels, Iran used mines and small boats to harass the convoys steaming to and from Kuwait, at the time a principal ally of Iraq. In late July 1987, Rear Admiral Harold J. Bernsen, Commander, Middle East Force, requested Naval Special Warfare assets. Special Boat Teams deployed with six Mark III Patrol Boats and two Navy SEAL platoons in August. The Middle East Force decided to convert two oil service barges, Hercules and Wimbrown VII, into mobile sea bases. These were moored in the northern Persian Gulf, allowing special operations forces to thwart clandestine Iranian mining and small boat attacks.

On 21 September, MH-6 and AH-6 "Little Birds" of the 160th Special Operations Aviation Regiment took off from the frigates USS Jarrett and USS Klakring to track an Iranian ship, Iran Ajr. The Nightstalkers watched Iran Ajr turn off its lights and begin laying mines. After receiving permission to attack, the helicopters fired guns and rockets, stopping the ship. Iran Ajr's crew continued to push mines over the side, and the aircraft resumed firing until the crew abandoned ship.

At first light, a SEAL team, assisted by Special Boat Teams, boarded the vessel and discovered nine mines on the vessel's deck, as well as a logbook revealing areas where previous mines had been laid. USS Hawes towed the mine layer (a converted tank landing craft) to the Iran-Iraq war zone. Explosive Ordnance Disposal (EOD) technicians from EOD Mobile Unit 5 scuttled the vessel the following day. The logbook implicated Iran in mining international waters.

Within a few days, the special operations forces had determined the Iranian pattern of activity: hide during the day near oil and gas platforms in Iranian waters and at night, head toward the Middle Shoals Buoy, a navigation aid for tankers. With this knowledge, the special operations forces launched three Little Bird aircraft and two patrol craft to the buoy. The aircraft arrived first and were fired upon by three Iranian boats anchored near the buoy. In a short but intense firefight, the aircraft sank all three boats. The captured and wounded Iranians were later taken aboard the USS Guadalcanal for treatment. The injured Iranian detainees were returned through cooperation between the U.S. Red Cross and the Red Crescent.

Lessons from Earnest Will later led USSOCOM to acquire the patrol coastal ships and the Mark V Special Operations Craft.

=== Operation Nimble Archer ===
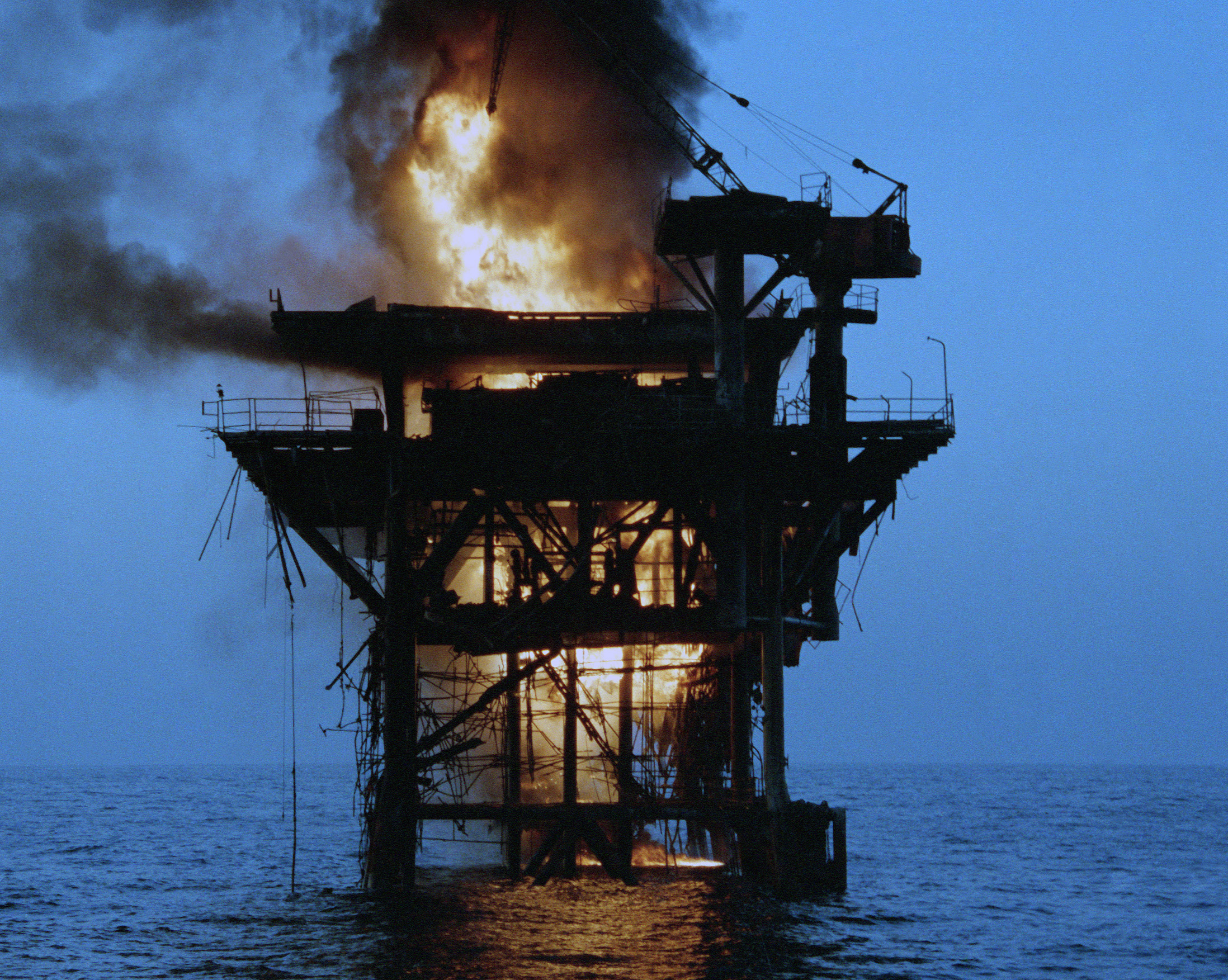
Rostam, one of two Iranian oil platforms set ablaze after shelling by American destroyers.

On 15 October, the reflagged U.S. tanker Sea Isle City was struck by an Iranian Silkworm missile while at anchor near the oil terminal outside Kuwait City. Seventeen crewmen and the American captain were injured in the attack. On 18 October, the U.S. Navy responded with Operation Nimble Archer. Four destroyers shelled two Revolutionary Guard bases in the Rostam oil field, located on oil platforms, that had been used to stage attacks on shipping. After the shelling, the USS Thach landed a SEAL platoon and a demolition unit that planted explosives on one of the platforms to destroy it. The SEALs then boarded and searched a third platform two miles away (3.2 km). Documents and radios were taken for intelligence.

=== Operation Praying Mantis ===
On 14 April 1988, 65 miles (105 km) east of Bahrain, the frigate USS Samuel B. Roberts hit a mine, blowing an immense hole in its hull. 10 sailors were injured. The U.S. retaliated fiercely. On 18 April, U.S. forces launched Operation Praying Mantis, attacking the Iranian fast-attack craft Joshan, the frigates Sabalan and Sahand and Revolutionary Guard bases in the Sirri and Sassan oil fields. After U.S. warships bombarded the Sirri base, located on an oil platform, and set it ablaze, a UH-60 helicopter with a SEAL platoon flew toward the platform but was unable to get close enough because of the roaring fire. Secondary explosions soon wrecked the platform.

=== Endgame ===
Thereafter, Iranian attacks on neutral ships dropped drastically. On 3 July 1988, USS Vincennes, mistook Iran Air Flight 655 for an Iranian F-14 and shot it down over the Strait of Hormuz. All 290 passengers and aircrew aboard the Airbus A300B2 died, including 65 children or infants.

The two effects of Earnest Will – Praying Mantis and the airliner's downing – helped convince Iran to agree to a ceasefire on 18 July 1988 and a permanent end to hostilities on 20 August 1988, ending its eight-year war with Iraq.

On 26 September 1988, USS Vandegrift escorted the operation's last tanker to Kuwait. The remaining SEALs, patrol boats, and helicopters then returned to the U.S.

== See also ==
- Iran Air Flight 655
