= Iran Ajr =

1978 Japanese-built landing craft used by Iran

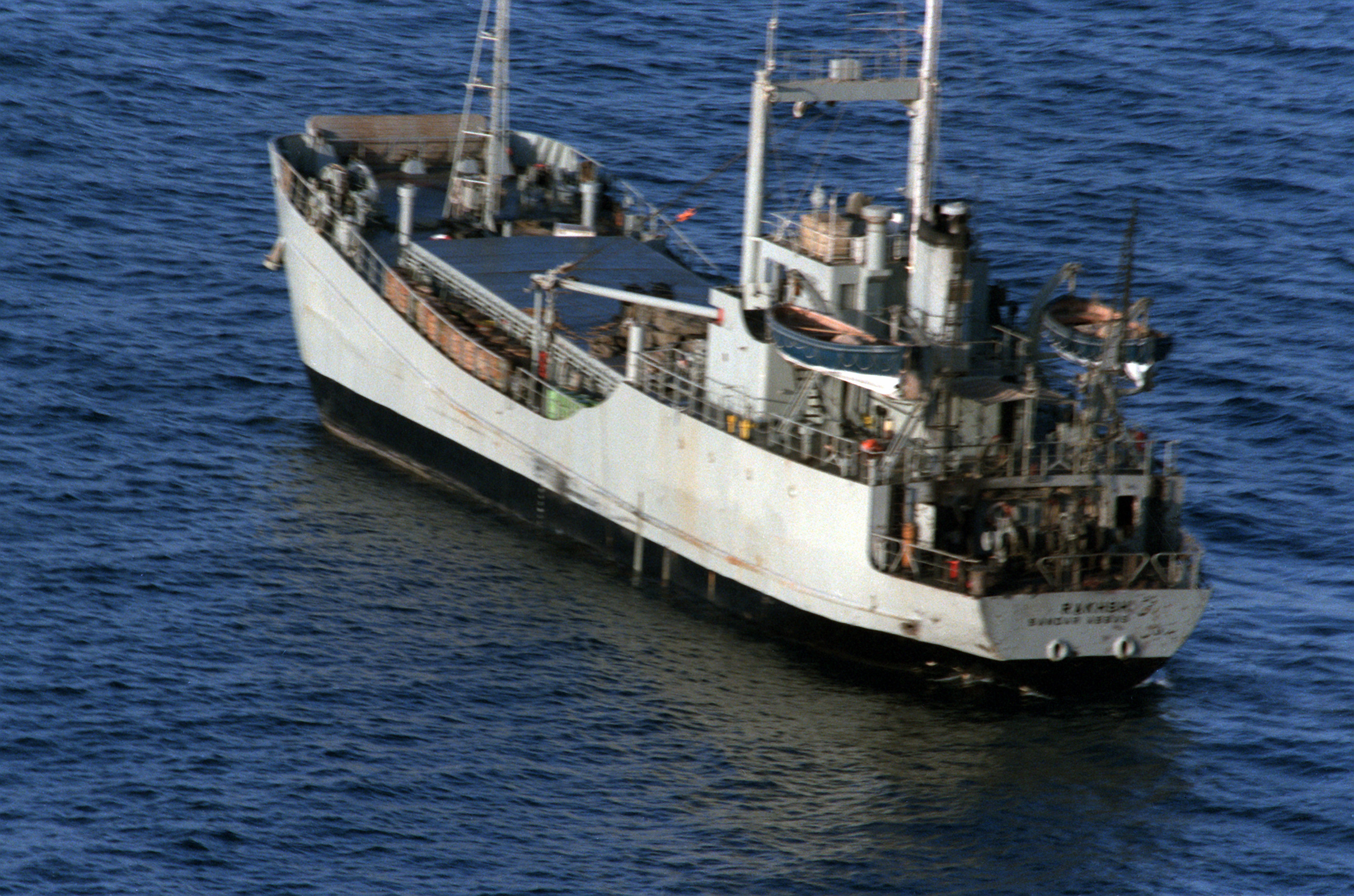
- Iran Ajr, 1986

History

Iran
- Name: Iran Ajr
- Builder: Teraoka Shipyard - Minamiawaji, Japan
- Christened: Arya Rakhsh
- Acquired: by purchase, 1978
- Renamed: Iran Ajr (1980)
- Identification: IMO number: 7807196
- Fate: Seized and scuttled by U.S. Navy, 26 September 1987
- Notes: Originally acquired by Imperial Iranian Navy as part of pre-1979 Revolution defense build-up. Was intended to be the first of a class of four.

General characteristics
- Type: Landing ship/Minelayer
- Displacement: 614 t (604 long tons) empty; 2,274 t (2,238 long tons) full load
- Length: 53.85 m (176 ft 8 in)
- Beam: 10.81 m (35 ft 6 in)
- Draught: 3 m (9 ft 10 in)
- Propulsion: 2 × diesel engines, 2 screws
- Speed: 11 knots (20 km/h; 13 mph)
- Complement: 30
- Armament: 2 × 12.7 mm (0.50 in) machine guns; Variable number of mines of various types

Iran Ajr (Persian: ایران اجر, lit. 'Iran Gift'), formerly known as the Arya Rakhsh, was a Japanese-built landing craft used by Iran to lay naval mines during the Iran–Iraq War. Built in 1978, the 614-ton, 54-meter ship was powered by two diesel engines and featured a bow ramp for unloading cargo. She was scuttled in 1987.

== Iran–Iraq War ==
On 21 September 1987, U.S. forces involved in Operation Prime Chance – the covert part of Operation Earnest Will, the mission to protect U.S.-flagged petroleum-carrying ships in the Persian Gulf – tracked Iran Ajr and dispatched United States Army helicopters from the United States Navy guided-missile frigate USS Jarrett (FFG-33) to shadow her. When the aviators reported that people aboard Iran Ajr were laying mines, the U.S. commander in the Persian Gulf ordered the pilots to "stop the mining." The helicopters fired on the ship, killing some of the crewmen and chasing others into the water. A team of United States Navy SEAL commandos later boarded the ship, confirmed the presence of mines, and detained the 26 surviving Iranians.

Rear Admiral Harold Bernsen said later that the detainees "were given the opportunity to seek political asylum. I think that was stated in Washington." Bernsen was "not actually present" when the offers were made by "an officer on my staff," whom he refused to identify. There were no State Department personnel present at the time, he said, but it was within his authority to make the offer in conformity with the policies of the US Department of State. "I think it was done very simply, and very generously."

On 26 September, EOD MU5 Detachment 5 scuttled the ship in international waters.

When the U.S. Navy guided-missile frigate USS Samuel B. Roberts (FFG-58) struck a mine in the Persian Gulf in April 1988, U.S. Navy explosive ordnance specialists matched the serial numbers of nearby unexploded mines to the ones aboard Iran Ajr. This evidence of Iranian involvement in the mining of Samuel B. Roberts led to the biggest surface-warfare naval battle since World War II, the retribution campaign of 18 April 1988 called Operation Praying Mantis.

The captured colors of Iran Ajr are in the U.S. Navy Museum.
