= Iranian genocide =

Iranian genocide may refer to:

== Pre-modern History ==
- Muslim conquest of Persia, over 40,000 defenders died
- Mongol conquest of Persia and Mesopotamia, Estimated about 15 million died

== Modern History ==
- Persian famine of 1917–1919, widespread mass starvation and disease under rule of Qajar dynasty which cause 2-10m deaths
- Iranian famine of 1942–1943, widespread mass starvation after Anglo-Soviet occupation

=== Massacres in Iran caused by the Islamic Republic ===
- 1981–1982 Iran massacres — 3,500+ executed
- 1988 executions of Iranian political prisoners — 5,000+ executed
- 2026 Iran massacres — 36,500+ killed; many more injured, blinded, and/or raped by IRGC forces, It has been described as a "Genocide under digital blackout"

== Other uses ==
- During the 2026 Iran war, US president Donald Trump has been accused of threatening genocide against Iran.
