= Persian famine of 1917–1919 =

Iranian famine under the Qajar dynasty

Iranian famine of 1917–1919
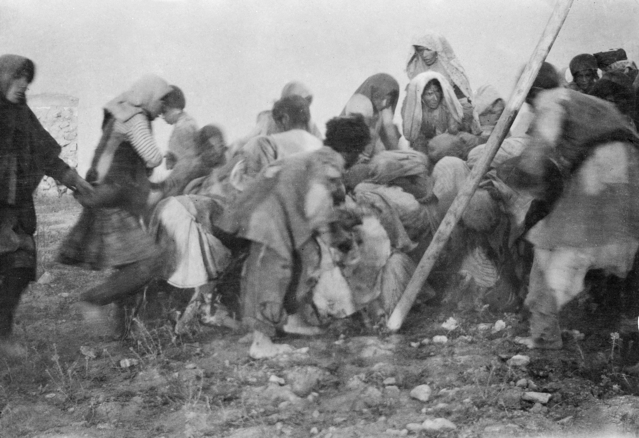
- People in Bijar rushing for the entrails of a sheep. (Australian War Memorial collection)
- Country: Iran
- Period: 1917–1919
- Total deaths: Disputed: ~2 million (mainstream sources); 8–10 million (Mohammad Gholi Majd)
- Preceded by: 1870–1872 famine
- Succeeded by: 1942–1943 famine

The Persian famine of 1917–1919 or the Iranian famine of 1917–1919 was a period of widespread mass starvation and disease in Iran under the rule of the Qajar dynasty during World War I. The famine took place in the territory of Iran, which, despite declaring neutrality, was occupied by the forces of the British, Russian, and Ottoman empires whose occupation contributed to the famine.

According to mainstream scholarship, approximately 2 million people died between 1917 and 1919. By contrast, Mohammad Gholi Majd has cited much higher estimates of 8–10 million excess deaths, although Majd's figures have not gained widespread acceptance among academic historians or awareness among the general public. The death toll was caused by hunger and from diseases, which included cholera, plague and typhus, as well as influenza stemming from the 1918 flu pandemic. A variety of factors are believed to have caused and contributed to the famine, including successive seasonal droughts, requisitioning and confiscation of foodstuffs by occupying armies, speculation, hoarding, war profiteering, and poor harvests.

== Background ==
In November 1915, the price of one kharvar (100 kilos) of wheat increased to twenty tomans, "if there [was] any to be found", after the total granary of the south-eastern province of Sistan was sold off to the British troops. Russian troops blockaded all the roads in the north-eastern province of Khorasan, prohibiting any transfers of grain, except those destined for the Russian army. The requisitioning of pack animals, mules and camels for the oil industry in Khuzestan, and for the British and Russian armed forces, left the country's transport network in serious disarray, and disrupted the distribution of foodstuffs and other goods throughout the country – with disastrous consequences. During the war, it often cost more to transport grain than to grow it, in many parts of Iran. All this made the living conditions of the poor even more dreadful.

Capacity of modern hospitals operating in Iran as of 1920
Affiliation	City	Total beds	Notes
(Iran); Persian	Tehran	372	+Pharmacy +Dispensary
(Iran); Persian	Enzeli	15	+Pharmacy +Dispensary
(Iran); Persian	Tabriz	30	
(Iran); Persian	Hamadan	12	Outpatient only
(Iran); Persian	Mashhad	90	
(Iran); Persian	Qazvin	25–30	+Dispensary
(Iran); Persian	Mohammerah	20	
(Iran); Persian	Malayer	10	
(Iran); Persian	Sabzevar	Unknown	
Church; Missionary; Society	Isfahan	180	
Church; Missionary; Society	Kerman	80	
Church; Missionary; Society	Yazd	80	
Church; Missionary; Society	Shiraz	50	
Presbyterian; Mission	Tehran	45	+Apothecary
Presbyterian; Mission	Mashhad	50	+Apothecary
Presbyterian; Mission	Rasht	5	+Apothecary
Presbyterian; Mission	Hamadan	25	+Apothecary
Presbyterian; Mission	Kermanshah	25	+Apothecary
Presbyterian; Mission	Tabriz	100	+Apothecary
Presbyterian; Mission	Urmieh	40	+Apothecary
Filles de la charité	Khosrova	8	
(Germany); German (until 1915)
(Germany); German (until 1915)	Tehran	Unknown	Legation
(Germany); German (until 1915)	Tabriz	—N/a	Apothecary only
(Germany); German (until 1915)	Barfrouch	—N/a	Apothecary only
(Germany); German (until 1915)	Rasht	—N/a	Apothecary only
(Germany); German (until 1915)	Hamadan	—N/a	Apothecary only
(Germany); German (until 1915)	Sanandaj	—N/a	Apothecary only
(Germany); German (until 1915)	Kermanshah	—N/a	Apothecary only
Russian; Red; Cross (until 1918)	Tehran	Unknown (Small hospitals)	
Russian; Red; Cross (until 1918)	Torbat-e Heydarieh	Unknown (Small hospitals)	
Russian; Red; Cross (until 1918)	Mashhad	Unknown (Small hospitals)	
Russian; Red; Cross (until 1918)	Tabriz	Unknown (Small hospitals)	
Russian; Red; Cross (until 1918)	Urmieh	Unknown (Small hospitals)	
(United Kingdom); British	Tehran	Unknown (Small hospitals)	+Dispensary
(United Kingdom); British	Mashhad	Unknown (Small hospitals)	
(United Kingdom); British	Torbat-e Heydarieh	Unknown (Small hospitals)	
(United Kingdom); British	Naserabad	Unknown (Small hospitals)	+Dispensary
(United Kingdom); British	Bushehr	Unknown (Small hospitals)	
(United Kingdom); British	Kermanshah	Unknown (Small hospitals)	
(United Kingdom); British	Lengeh	Unknown (Small hospitals)	+Dispensary
(United Kingdom); British	Mohammerah	Unknown (Small hospitals)	+Dispensary
(United Kingdom); British	Ahvaz	Unknown (Small hospitals)	
Anglo-Persian; Oil Company	Abadan	>200	+Dispensary
Anglo-Persian; Oil Company	Masjed Soleiman	>200	+Dispensary
Anglo-Persian; Oil Company	Ahvaz	>200	+Dispensary
Anglo-Persian; Oil Company	Mohammerah	>200	+Dispensary

== Spread ==
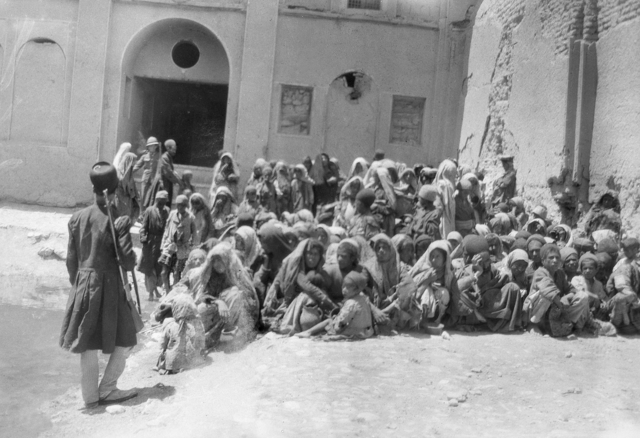
People awaiting to be fed with stew. Photo taken by 1st Australian Wireless Signal Squadron in Bijar

A series of severe droughts from 1916 on further depleted agricultural supplies. By early February 1918, the famine spread throughout the country, and panicked crowds in major cities began to loot bakeries and food stores. In the western city of Kermanshah, confrontations between the hungry poor and the police ended in casualties. In Tehran, the situation was "aggravated by hoarding and short-selling to the customers by bakers".

Adulteration of bread, as well as the exorbitant prices charged by some bakers, outraged Tehran's working poor. Printing-house workers who had recently formed a union staged a demonstration in Tehran in 1919, during which crowds attacked the bakeries and granaries. They called on the government to increase food rations, to standardize the price of bread, and to regulate the quality, supply and sales of foodstuffs. Nevertheless, in the turbulent post-war era neither the national government nor foreign powers were in a position to do much to alleviate the human crises. The devastation caused by famine and contagious diseases continued for many years.

Cases of cannibalism were also reported.

== Outbreak of diseases ==
Beyond deaths from starvation, epidemics also killed large numbers of people.

The colossal food crisis, plus large numbers of soldiers, refugees and destitute people constantly on the move in search of work and survival, facilitated a deadly combination of pandemics and contagious diseases. Cholera, the plague and typhus spread with terrifying speed across the country.

=== Influenza ===
Morbidity and Mortality during the 1918–1919 Influenza Pandemic in Urban Iran (Compiled by Afkhami)
City	Population Est.	Morbidity	Mortality		Mortality/ Morbidity (%)
City	Population Est.	Morbidity	No.	%	Mortality/ Morbidity (%)
Mashhad	100,000	66,667	3,500	3.5	5.2
Birjand	Unknown	12,000	100	Unknown	0.8
Nosratabad	Unknown	7,000	120	Unknown	1.7
Anzali	10,000	Unknown			2.0
Mashhadsar	Unknown				10.0
Tabriz	200,000	100,000	Unknown		
Hamedan	30,000	Unknown	1,000	3.3	10.0
Tehran	250,000	Unknown	1,000	0.8	Unknown
Isfahan	80,000	Unknown	300	0.4	Unknown
Yazd	40,000	Unknown	250	0.6	Unknown
Bushehr	30,000	15,000	1,500	5.0	10.0
Mohammareh	Unknown	6,000	250	Unknown	4.2
Shiraz	50,000	Unknown	2,000	4.0	Unknown
Kerman	40,000	Unknown	4,000	10.0	10.0
Bam	13,000	Unknown	6,000	46.2	Unknown

The 1918 flu pandemic spread to the entire country via three main entry routes: Transcaucasia to Tabriz, Baghdad to Kermanshah and India to southern Iran (the latter significantly vected by the British Indian Army soldiers stationed in Bushehr). The rural areas were more affected than urban regions, in which as many as 20% of people were reported to have died. Azizi et al comment that the figure is exaggerated, adding that the mortality rate in Kermanshah and Tehran was about 1%. Afkhami states that the flu impact was enormous and estimates that between 902,400 and 2,431,000 or 8.0% and 21.7% of the total population died, making Iran one of the most devastated countries worldwide. Floor assessed the figure estimated by Afkhami as much higher than the real casualties.

=== Cholera ===
In 1916, cholera that hit Azerbaijan in 1915, was widespread not only in all northern provinces, it also reached the south. In 1917, it appeared in Mazandaran and Khorasan, killing 188 and 308 people in the two regions respectively, according to a 1924 government report. Ahmad Seyf states that the origin of cholera outbreak was Russia, and it was not severe.

=== Typhoid and Typhus ===
Typhoid spread in many parts of the country, and caused enough deaths that, according to an eyewitness, "the high mortality in Tehran was not due to famine, but rather because of typhoid and typhus".

== Causes and contributing factors ==
According to Touraj Atabaki, "successive seasonal droughts caused widespread famine during 1917/1918. Requisition and confiscation of foodstuffs by occupying armies to feed their soldiers, which added to the famine". In The Cambridge History of Iran, it is stated that speculation and hoarding made the situation worse. Michael Axworthy believes that the famine was "partly as a result of the dislocation of trade and agricultural production caused by the war". Tammy M. Proctor comments that the cause for food shortage was a combination of army requisitioning, war profiteering, hoarding and poor harvests.

Nikki Keddie and Yann Richard related the famine to almost all of the factors mentioned above.

Charles P. Melville maintains that the main reason of the famine were the conditions caused by the War.

Mohammad Gholi Majd, holds the British occupation and its custom and finance regulations accountable for worsening the famine, and Willem Floor suggests James L. Barton's account (occupation by armies, exceptionally light snowfall and disease), joint with hoarding by landowners and lack of purchasing power as other crucial causes of famine. According to him, two major grain producing areas, namely Kermanshah–Hamadan and Azarbaijan were the battlefield between the Ottomans and the Russians.

Rob Johnson blames bad governance and wartime shortages for the famine.

== Death toll ==
Scholars such as Ervand Abrahamian, Homa Katouzian and Barry Rubin maintain that the total death toll due to starvation and disease was around 2 million. Central Intelligence Agency analysts Steven R. Ward and Kenneth M. Pollack state a similar number. Nikki Keddie and Yann Richard state that about one-quarter of the population of northern Iran were killed.

Mohammad Gholi Majd's book, The Great Famine and Genocide in Persia, 1917–1919, identifies a number of allied sources that detail the proportion and scale of the deaths, and alleges that as many as 8–10 million died, across the whole nation, based on an alternate pre-famine Persian population estimate of 19 million. Timothy C. Winegard and Pordeli et al. acknowledge the figures suggested by Majd. A 2023 article in Third World Quarterly also favorably cited Majd's work.

Abrahamian comments that Majd's book includes an "exaggerated discussion" of losses during the famine, a view he shares with Mahmood Messkoub, Abbas Milani and Rudi Matthee. Abrahamian describes calling the famine a genocide as "wild accusation" and attributes the vast majority of the 2 million deaths he estimates to cholera and typhus epidemics, as well as mostly worldwide influenza pandemic. While accepting that the total death toll could be several millions, Hormoz Ebrahimnejad says Majd's figure is an overestimation.

Cormac Ó Gráda, discussing the difficulty of verifying the death toll of historical famines, describes the claim of genocide as "not possible to take literally": "Such claims are usually rhetorical, and sure signs of major disasters, but poor guides to actual mortality." A similar view is expressed by Alidad Mafinezam and Aria Mehrabi, who state that Majd's work suffers from methodological defects, including lack of triangulation.

== Reaction ==
During the famine years, several politicians served as Prime Minister and all adopted interventionist policies. In order to control the situation of food supply, the Iranian government appointed Abdollah Mostowfi as chief of the alimentation service (raʾīs-e arzāq) in October 1916, before his later boss Mokhber al-Saltaneh took office as the minister for alimentation (vazīr-e arzāq) in October 1917. Siham al-Dawlah became chief of the bakery bureau (raʾīs-e nānvāʾī) in 1918 and an alimentation committee (komīté-ye arzāq) was also formed out of seven or eight influential merchants. The committee met daily and assisted the government with advice, including a proposal to introduce government incentive for bread.

In 1918, the United States rejected the request of the Iranian government for a $2 million loan dedicated to famine relief.

Members of the Jungle movement sheltered refugees who came to Gilan from other parts of the country and founded a charity to help them. They also sent several tons of rice to the capital. In Tabriz, the Democrats who were armed suppressed hoarders and speculators while organizing the relief.

Congregational prayers for rain were observed during the famine, including those of Mashhad in 1917, where babies and animals were also brought.

In Tabriz, medical missionary William Summerill Vanneman was appointed by the U.S. consul to be chairman of the Tabriz relief committee. In this role, he communicated with Secretary of State Robert Lansing and U.S. Ambassador Henry Morgenthau to manage funds sent by the American Committee for Armenian and Syrian Relief, now known as the Near East Foundation.

== Contemporary perceptions ==
BBC Persian's documentary Iran 1918: A Forgotten War for Oil

In recent years, the famine has been subject to conspiracy theories, polarization and historical revisionism in Iran. Much of the controversy is about the death toll and root causes, and lack of sufficient data on this period has been described as the "principal driver" for it. The official website of Ali Khamenei, then Iran's supreme leader, published an article in 2015 asserting the view that the famine was a deliberate act of genocide committed by the British, whose documents have been intentionally wiped out in a cover-up attempt. The British Broadcasting Corporation (BBC) produced and aired a documentary on the famine, which was condemned by conservatives in Iran as a ploy to minimise British role and underline the feebleness of Iran.

=== Depictions ===
- The Orphanage of Iran (2016)
