= Anglo-Soviet invasion of Iran =

1941 conflict of World War II

- Part of the Mediterranean and Middle East theatre of World War II
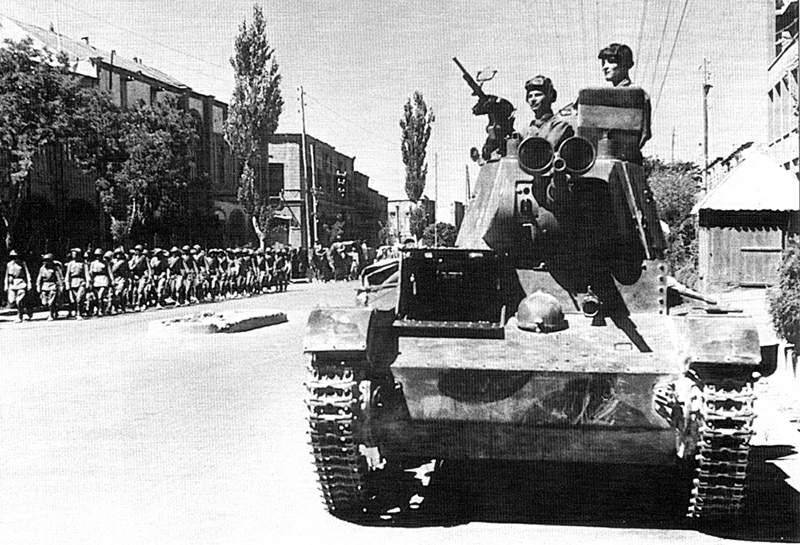
- Soviet tankmen of the 6th Tank Division driving through Tabriz on their T-26, 28 August 1941
Date	25–31 August 1941 (6 days)
Location	Iran 32°N 53°E
Result	Anglo-Soviet victory: Abdication of Iranian monarch Reza Shah on 16 September 1941; Rise to power of Iranian crown prince Mohammad Reza Pahlavi; Opening of the Persian Corridor by the Allies to support the Soviets against the German invasion; The invasion resulted in the Iranian famine of 1942–1943
Territorial changes	Military occupation of Iran for the remainder of World War II: Soviet occupation of northern Iran; British occupation of southern Iran

Belligerents
Soviet Union: British Empire; United Kingdom; India; Australia (naval only)	Iran

Commanders and leaders
(Soviet Union) Joseph Stalin (Soviet Union) Dmitry Kozlov (Soviet Union) Sergei Trofimenko (United Kingdom) Edward Quinan (United Kingdom) William Slim	(Pahlavi Iran) Reza Shah (Pahlavi Iran) Ali Mansur (Pahlavi Iran) Mohammad Ali Foroughi (Pahlavi Iran) Ahmad Nakhjavan (Pahlavi Iran) Mahmud Mir-Djalali (Pahlavi Iran) Mohammad Shahbakhti (Pahlavi Iran) Ahmad Mirza-Khosravani (Pahlavi Iran) Gholamali Bayandor †

Strength
Soviet Union: 3 armies; British Empire: 2 divisions, 3 brigades; 4 sloops; 1 gunboat; 1 corvette; 1 armed merchant cruiser; 1 armed yacht; ? auxiliary vessels	9 divisions; 60 aircraft; 2 sloops; 4 patrol boats

Casualties and losses
Soviet Union: 40 killed; 3 aircraft destroyed; British Empire: 22 killed; 50 wounded; 1 tank destroyed	~850 killed; 7 aircraft destroyed; 3 sloops destroyed; 3 patrol boats captured
- Civilian casualties: ~450 Iranian civilians killed

The Anglo-Soviet invasion of Iran, also known as the Anglo-Soviet invasion of Persia or the Allied invasion of Iran, was the joint invasion of the officially neutral Imperial State of Iran by the United Kingdom and the Soviet Union in August 1941, during World War II. Iran would remain under British and Soviet occupation until 1946, months after the war's end. Britain began to withdraw on 2 March 1946, while the Soviets did not leave until May, having sparked an international crisis through their refusal to do so.

The invasion, code named Operation Countenance, was largely unopposed by the numerically and technologically outmatched Iranian forces. The multi-pronged coordinated invasion took place along Iran's borders with the Kingdom of Iraq, Azerbaijan SSR, and Turkmen SSR, with fighting beginning on 25 August and ending on 31 August when the Iranian government, under the rule of Reza Shah Pahlavi, formally agreed to surrender, having already agreed to a ceasefire on 30 August.

The invasion took place two months after the Axis invasion of the Soviet Union and the Soviet Union's subsequent alliance with the United Kingdom. The attack also took place less than two months after Allied victories over pro-Axis forces in neighboring Iraq, French Syria and Lebanon. The invasion's strategic purpose was to ensure the safety of Allied supply lines to the USSR (see the Persian Corridor), secure Iranian oil fields, limit German influence in Iran (due to the presence of Germans in Iran, mainly for industrial purpose) and preempt a possible Axis advance from Turkey through Iran toward the Baku oil fields or British India. Following the invasion, on 16 September 1941 Reza Shah was forced to abdicate and went into exile, being replaced by his young son Mohammad Reza Pahlavi.

== Background ==
In 1921, Reza Khan Pahlavi performed a coup d'état against the Qajar dynasty (1789–1925). He later overthrew the ruling dynasty in 1925 and crowned himself as Reza Shah that same year. He commenced an ambitious program of economic, cultural, and military modernization. Reza Shah's regime established schools, built infrastructure, modernized cities, and expanded transportation networks. The Shah pursued a foreign policy of neutrality, but depended on Western financing in order to finance his ambitious modernization projects.

In early 1940, as Britain was involved in war with Germany in North Africa, it grew concerned about German access to the Persian Gulf, especially in light of Germany's non-aggression pact with the Soviet Union. The British began to accuse Iran of supporting Nazism and of being pro-German. Indeed, Reza Shah had developed great sympathy for the Nazi cause. Although Reza Shah declared neutrality at an early stage of World War II, he clearly tilted towards Germany, and allowed hundreds of German agents to operate inside Iran. Iran assumed great strategic importance to the British government, which feared that the Abadan Refinery (of the UK-owned Anglo-Iranian Oil Company) might fall into German hands. Refining eight million tons of oil in 1940, the refinery made a crucial contribution to the Allied war effort. Relations between Britain and Iran had been strained since 1931 when the Shah unilaterally cancelled the D'Arcy Concession – a 1901 agreement that had given the Anglo-Iranian Oil Company the exclusive right to prospect for Iranian oil for 60 years, with Iran receiving 16 percent of the net profit. Led by the Shah, the Iranian imperial government accused the Company of undercutting its share of the profit by clandestinely reinvesting new capital into subsidiary companies, and thus excluding a significant sum from the annual capital gain calculation. Though the Shah promptly renegotiated a second concession with the Anglo-Iranian Company – with terms that better protected the Iranians' stake – the diplomatic conflict created an impression that the Shah was hostile to British oil interests.

Following Operation Barbarossa, the Axis invasion of the Soviet Union in June 1941, Britain and the Soviet Union became formal allies, providing further impetus for an Allied invasion. In a major strategic analysis in the New York Times on a Sunday following Barbarossa, the famous international correspondent C. L. Sulzberger stated, in reference to the Operation Orient, "It is considered virtually a certainty by military experts that if the Reich succeeds...an attack on Egypt will be launched. Should the Germans...occupy the Caucasus and then push on to Iran and the Persian Gulf they will then outflank the British Middle Eastern positions by a wide sweep and perhaps by Autumn begin to make trouble in Iraq." With the Wehrmacht steadily advancing through the Soviet Union, the Persian Corridor formed by the Trans-Iranian Railway offered one of the easiest ways to supply the Soviets with Lend-Lease goods sent by sea from the then technically neutral United States. British and Soviet planners recognized the importance of that railway and sought to control it. As increasing U-boat attacks and winter ice made convoys to Arkhangelsk (which commenced in August 1941) dangerous, the railway seemed an increasingly attractive strategic route.

The two Allied nations applied pressure on Iran and on the Shah, which led to increased tensions and to anti-British rallies in Tehran. The British described the protests as "pro-German". Iran's strategic location threatened Soviet Caucasian oil and the Soviet armies' rear, and any German advance south-eastwards would threaten British communications between India and the Mediterranean.

In July and August, the Shah refused demands from the British for the expulsion of German residents from Iran (mostly workers and diplomats). A British embassy report, dated 1940, estimated that there were almost 1,000 German nationals in Iran. According to Iran's Ettela'at newspaper, there were 690 German nationals in Iran (out of a total of 4,630 foreigners, including 2,590 British). Joan Beaumont estimates that "probably no more than 3,000 Germans actually lived in Iran, but they were believed to have a disproportionate influence because of their employment in strategic government industries and in Iran's transport and communications network."

However, the Iranians began to reduce their trade with the Germans in the face of Allied demands. Reza Shah sought to remain neutral, not wanting to anger either side. This approach became increasingly difficult in the face of Anglo-Soviet demands. British forces were already present in sizeable numbers in Iraq as a result of the Anglo-Iraqi War of May 1941. Allied leaders feared that the Nazis were planning on using Iran as a platform for attack across the Soviet Union's southern border, adding an extra layer of complication to the Allied war effort. This directly led to the joint Soviet-British invasion.

== Invasion ==
The invasion was a surprise attack described by Allied forces as rapid and conducted with ease. Prior to the invasion, two diplomatic notes were delivered to the Iranian government on 19 July and 17 August, requiring the Iranian government to expel German nationals. The second of the notes was recognised by the prime minister Ali Mansur as a disguised ultimatum. General Archibald Wavell later wrote in his despatch, "it was apparent that the Iranian Government fully expected an early British advance into Khuzestan and that reinforcements, including light and medium tanks, were being sent to Ahvaz".

Following the invasion, Sir Reader Bullard and Andrey Andreyevich Smirnov, the British and Soviet ambassadors to Iran, were summoned. The Shah demanded to know why they were invading his country and why they had not declared war. Both answered that it was because of "German residents" in Iran. When the Shah asked if the Allies would stop their attack if he expelled the Germans, the ambassadors did not answer. The Shah sent a telegram to US President Franklin D. Roosevelt, pleading with him to stop the invasion. As the neutral United States had nothing to do with the attack, Roosevelt was not able to grant the Shah's plea but stated that he believed that the "territorial integrity" of Iran should be respected. In his post-war memoirs, Winston Churchill invoked the brocard, "Inter arma silent leges" to justify the "exercise of overwhelming force against a weak and ancient state."

=== Beginning of the invasion ===
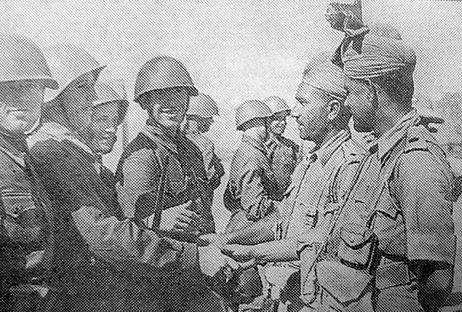
Soviet and Indian soldiers meet in late August.

The Royal Navy and Royal Australian Navy attacked from the Persian Gulf, while other British Commonwealth forces came by land and air from Iraq. The Soviet Union invaded from the north, mostly from Transcaucasia, with the 44th and 47th Armies of the Transcaucasian Front (General Dmitry Timofeyevich Kozlov), and the 53rd Army of the Central Asian Military District, occupying Iran's northern provinces. Air force and naval units also participated in the battle. The Soviets used about 1,000 T-26 tanks for their combat operations.

Six days after the invasion and the ensuing Allied occupation of southern Iran, the British divisions previously known as "Iraq Command" (also known as Iraqforce) were renamed "Persia and Iraq Force" (Paiforce), under the command of Lieutenant-General Edward Quinan. Paiforce was made up of 8th and 10th Indian Infantry divisions, 2nd Indian Armoured Brigade, 4th British Cavalry Brigade (later renamed 9th Armoured Brigade), and 21st Indian Infantry Brigade.

In response to the invasion, the Imperial Iranian Army deployed nine infantry divisions, some of them motorised; two of the divisions also had tanks. The Iranian Army had a standing force of 126,000–200,000 men. While Iran had taken numerous steps through the previous decade to strengthen, standardise, and modernise its army, the army did not have enough training, armour, or air power to fight a multi-front war. Reza Shah's modernisations had not been completed by the time war broke out, and the Iranian Army had been more concerned with civilian repression than invasions.

The Iranian army was armed with the vz. 24 rifle, a Czech version of the Mauser Gewehr 98. Iranian troops also had other Czech small arms like the ZB vz. 30 and ZB-53. Iran had bought 100 FT-6 and ČKD TNH light tanks as well as some AH-IV tankettes and additional LaFrance TK-6 armoured cars, enough to outfit their 1st and 2nd Divisions. Further Iranian orders had been delayed by World War II. While it was a large order and they were excellent tanks, they were not enough to defeat a multi-front invasion by two great powers. The changing nature of tank warfare in the 1930s made all but 50 of them obsolete when the invasion began. The Imperial Iranian Air Force (IIAF) at the time flew a motley collection of outdated biplanes, including British Hawker Fury fighters and Hawker Hart bombers, and French aircraft such as the Bréguet 14, Bréguet 19, Potez VIII, and Blériot-SPAD S.42. The IIAF also had some Soviet-made aircraft: copies of the British DH.4 and DH.9A made by the Polikarpov factory, although not modern types such as the original Polikarpov R-5.

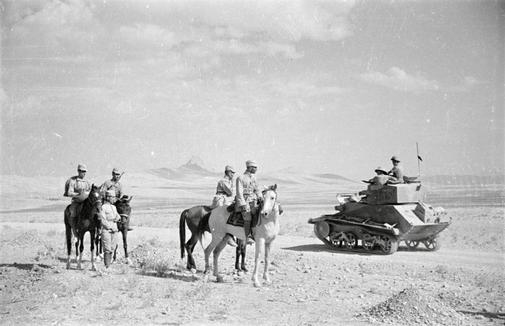
Soviet and British soldiers rendezvous near Qazvin.

The Iranians had little time to organise a defence, as the Allies achieved a tactical surprise. The war began in the early morning of 25 August, when RAF aircraft entered Iranian airspace. They bombed targets in the cities of Tehran and Qazvin and various other towns and dropped leaflets urging the Iranians to surrender. The Soviets bombed targets in cities such as Tabriz, Ardabil and Rasht. Civilian and residential areas were hit, and several hundred people were killed and wounded. Reza Shah refused requests by his generals to destroy the road and transportation networks, largely because he did not want to damage the infrastructure that he had painstakingly built during his reign. That contributed to the speedy victory of the Allies.

With no allies, Iranian resistance was rapidly overwhelmed and neutralised by Soviet and British tanks and infantry. The British and Soviet forces met at Sanandaj (called Senna by the British) (160 kilometres (100 mi) west of Hamadan) and Qazvin (called Kazvin by the British) (160 kilometres (100 mi) west of Tehran and 320 kilometres (200 mi) north-east of Hamadan) on 30 and 31 August respectively. Faced with massive defeats, the Shah ordered his military to stop fighting and stand down on 29 August, four days into the invasion.

=== British theatre ===
==== Invasion of Khuzestan ====
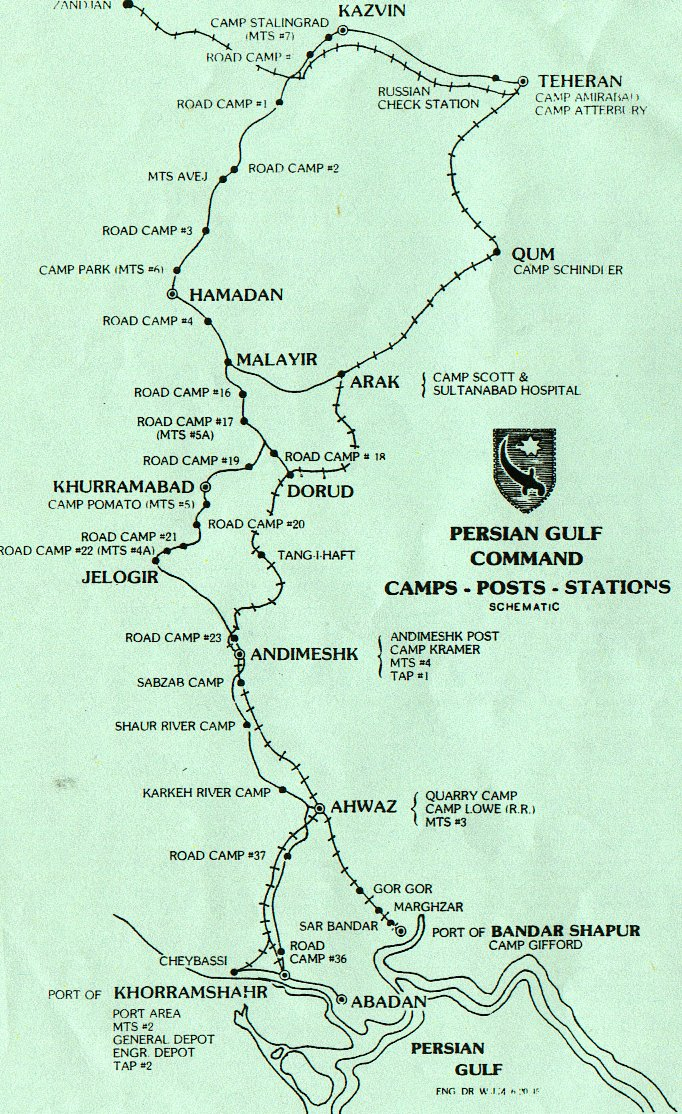
Persian Gulf Command map showing position of posts and stations

The British assembled a naval task force under Commodore Cosmo Graham to seize Bandar Shahpur, Abadan, and Khorramshahr. It attacked at dawn on 25 August 1941.

The naval attack began at 04:10 at Abadan when HMS Shoreham opened fire on the Iranian sloop Palang, sinking it in a single salvo. The Abadan refinery was of vital importance to the British commanders as well as keeping the employees of the Anglo-Iranian Oil Company safe from possible reprisals. Khuzestan Province was defended by 27,000 troops from the 1st, 2nd, 6th and 16th infantry divisions, consisting of both light and mechanised infantry. All Iranian tanks were deployed in Khuzestan as part of the 1st and 2nd divisions. Shoreham remained in the area and provided naval gunfire support. The Iranians managed to put up a resistance, and the refinery and the city were captured that afternoon after hand-to-hand combat resulted in the deaths of several British and Indian troops.

The Australian-crewed armed merchant cruiser HMS Kanimbla (later HMAS Kanimbla) and her escorts successfully navigated the Khor Musa inlet, arriving at Bandar Shapur at 04:15. Kanimbla successfully landed two battalions of its troops, facing no resistance from Iranian patrol boats. Seven Axis merchant vessels were seized, while an eighth was scuttled. The naval base there was secured that evening following heavy fighting. At Khorramshahr, HMAS Yarra surprised the Iranian sloop Babr, sinking it at its dock. There had been no time to prepare resistance, as the Iranians had been taken by surprise. In the conflict, the head of the navy, Gholamali Bayandor, was killed.

The surprise led to virtually no resistance in other areas of Khuzestan. The RAF attacked airbases and communications and rapidly gained air superiority.

The 8th Indian Division (18th Brigade plus the 22nd Brigade under command from the 10th Indian Division) advanced from Basra towards Qasr Sheikh (which was taken on 25 August) across the Shatt al-Arab waterway and captured the city of Khorramshahr, which was next to Abadan on the same day. The Karun River was not secured, as Iranian snipers remained, impeding British advance for a short time. Britain also landed troops at Bandar Abbas, and the Shatt al-Arab was secured.

The British hoped to capture Ahvaz and then drive north into Zagros Mountains passes to reach Qazvin, where they would link up with British troops in central Iran and Soviet troops from the north. By the early morning of 27 August, the British forces had reached Ahvaz. The Iranians, led by General Mohammad Shahbakhti, had prepared a strong defence. Iranian infantry had entrenched themselves around the city, with artillery support and tanks. Although Iranians had taken heavy losses and their morale was decreasing, they were prepared to fight hard. The Indian Army advance came to a halt and they were hesitant to cross the Karun River and attack the city. A British attack on the defences around the city was repelled by Iranian tanks and infantry.

Whether the Iranian defence could have been successful is debatable and on 29 August, after some more sporadic fighting, word reached the Iranian commanders at Ahvaz that their government had accepted a ceasefire and they were not to fight any longer. The British and Iranians agreed as part of the ceasefire that the Iranians would not lay down their arms and remain at their posts but they would be joined by the British troops, who would carry out a parade in the city. In exchange, the Iranians would safely evacuate British residents in the city to British troops.

==== Invasion of Central Iran ====
Farther north, the 10th Indian Infantry Division under Major-General William Slim attacked central Iran. Slim engagingly describes this in the 'Persian Pattern' chapter of his book 'Unofficial History'- including his staff car being engaged by an Iranian anti-tank gun on the Pa-i-Tak pass. The Indian Army infantry and armour massed at the Iraqi border town of Khanaqin (160 kilometres (100 mi) north-east of Baghdad and 480 kilometres (300 mi) from Basra).

The British force broke through the border at the town of Qasr-e Shirin and moved into the Naft-e Shah oilfield with little opposition. The RAF provided close air support and was involved in several dogfights with Iranian aircraft. Six Iranian fighters were shot down and several others damaged, for no loss, ensuring air superiority. The RAF also bombed several local towns and dropped leaflets urging surrender.

The main Iranian forces in the region consisted of the 5th and 12th Infantry Divisions of 30,000 troops with supporting artillery at Sanandaj and Kermanshah. They were all light infantry (as the mechanised and armour had been stretched thin fighting on multiple fronts). The British reached the outskirts of Shahabad in the early morning of 28 August after delays. By 29 August, the British had reached the town of Kerend and were within 3 kilometres (2 mi) of Kermanshah and the Iranian commanders were told of the ceasefire order and stood down. The defenders declared Kermanshah an open city and the British entered on 1 September.

=== Soviet theatre ===
==== Invasion of Northwestern Iran ====
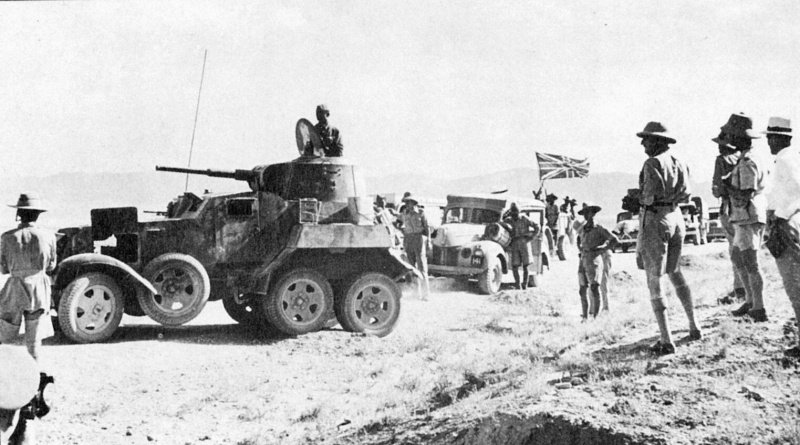
British supply convoy with Soviet escorts in Iran, September 1941

The Soviet forces attacked on 25 August and Iranian airbases were destroyed by preliminary air attacks. The Soviets attacked using three armoured spearheads, totalling over 1,000 tanks and motorised infantry; the Iranians had no tanks in the area. The first force, consisting of the 47th Army, broke through the border and moved from Soviet Azerbaijan and Soviet Armenia into Iranian Azerbaijan. They moved towards Tabriz and Lake Urmia. They captured the Iranian city of Jolfa. An Iranian reconnaissance aircraft discovered the forces south of Jolfa moving towards Marand. It was possible for the Iranian 3rd Division under General Matboodi to move motorised infantry towards Shibli to halt the breakthrough, but due to being taken by surprise, he failed to make the proper counter-attack. He also failed to destroy the bridges and highways with explosives, allowing the Soviets to rapidly move through the region.

The 53rd Army crossed the border and moved towards the city of Ardabil, defended by Iran's 15th Division led by Brigadier-General Qaderi. Two Iranian regiments began to move towards the town of Nir to confront the invaders. Despite having a solid force and well-motivated troops, Qaderi jumped into his car and abandoned his troops. He sabotaged the defence even further by ordering the supply trucks delivering food, weapons and artillery to unload their weapons to make way for his personal belongings. General Qaderi's actions left the Iranian troops without reinforcements, which led to a fast defeat by the Soviet Army. The Soviets bypassed Nir and moved south. On another front, the Soviet Army launched an attack on the village of Alikaran where the Iranian border guards were caught by surprise. The officer in command, Khalil Alinejad, ordered his troops back to the village to warn the population of the Soviet invasion, while he and a handful of troops gave them covering fire. Officer Alinejad and his troops were killed, and the village of Alikaran was shortly captured by the Red Army forces. Ardabil was bombed by the Soviet Air Force and received minor damage to its barracks. Cut off and bypassed, both the Iranian 15th Division in Ardabil and the 3rd Division in Tabriz began to collapse. Despite that, the regular troops tried to maintain order and began to march towards the enemy without many of their commanders. However, lacking food, supplies and ammunition, the troops were forced to abandon much of their heavy equipment. Heavy pockets of resistance remained, with some desperate fighting until the end. They were unsurprisingly beaten by the Soviets, who by 26 August, occupied all of Iranian Azerbaijan (including Tabriz and Ardabil).

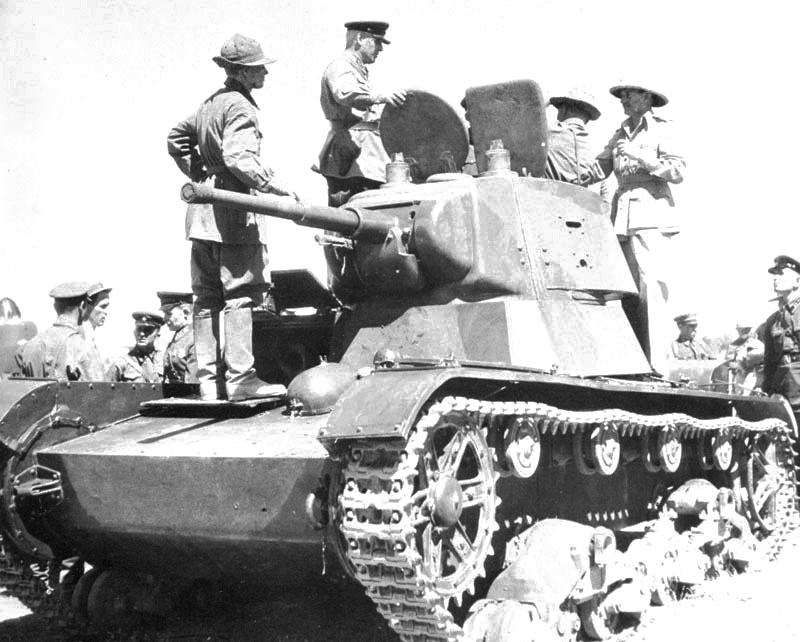
British soldiers inspecting a Soviet T-26, 31 August 1941

On 25 August, the Soviet attack against Gilan Province began with their Caspian Sea Flotilla, led by Rear-Admiral Sedelnikov. The flotilla consisted of more than a dozen patrol boats, destroyers, multiple anti-aircraft barges and landing craft. Facing them were three Iranian gunboats. Meanwhile, the 44th Army crossed the border and moved into Gilan Province. They moved along the Astara highway and the main coastal highway (Jadeh-e-Shomal). Heavy Iranian forces in the area made the naval landing force secure Iranian cities, which were then joined by the land forces. The flotilla landed troops and rapidly captured the border city of Astara. The landing force boarded their ships and moved towards their next targets.

The Iranian forces sank barges at the entrance to Pahlavi harbour, and lacking coastal artillery, moved a battery of 75 mm guns to the area. The Iranians fought desperately, and despite Soviet superiority, the Iranians prevented them from landing. The Iranians were careful to not fire their guns while Soviet aircraft flew overhead to prevent them from disclosing their location. Soviet aircraft were kept at bay by 47 mm anti-aircraft artillery on Iranian barges.

The next day, however, the Soviet Air Force moved into action, using many heavy bombers. In groups of 4 aircraft each, their bombers attacked military positions and civilian targets throughout Gilan, including Bandar Pahlavi and Rasht. At least 200 civilians were killed during the bombings. The bombings also destroyed many Iranian positions, and resistance was finally crushed by the 44th Army advancing from land, capturing both cities. Fighting was very intense, and the Soviets took their heaviest casualties of the invasion here. However, lacking armour and air power, the Iranians could not stop the enemy. On 28 August, they were forced to surrender. Nevertheless, some Iranian forces refused to accept defeat, and retreated to Ramsar to continue fighting. Their efforts were undercut when the Iranian government announced a ceasefire the next day.

==== Soviet advance on Iranian heartland ====
Meanwhile, the Soviet invasion force in Iranian Azerbaijan had moved south. The 47th Army had been delayed in the Jolfa area when three individual Iranian soldiers managed to block an important bridge until they ran out of ammunition and were killed. The Soviets did not use artillery for fear that they would damage the bridge and delay their advance further. The 47th Army moved south, capturing Dilman (130 kilometres (80 mi) west of Tabriz) and then Urmia (Oromiyeh), ostensibly to block the escape of "German agents". The latter was defended by only a few snipers. The Soviets responded by bombing targets in the city, killing over a dozen people and wounding many others, and much of the city's bazaar was burned.

Meanwhile, the 53rd Army moved south of Ardebil towards the Tehran-Karaj-Tabriz highway, capturing the city of Mianeh, East Azerbaijan and moving southeast towards Qazvin and Tehran by 27–28 August. Iran's 15th and 3rd divisions had already been bypassed and defeated, and there was only sporadic resistance against the Soviets. The Soviet armoured spearhead drove down the highway and poised to take Qazvin on the 29th (151 kilometres (94 mi) from Tehran), followed by Saveh and Qom, south of Tehran, cutting the main Tehran-Saveh-Persian Gulf highway and cutting Iran effectively in two. But the Iranians accepted the ceasefire on 29 August, and the Soviets entered the now "open city" on 30 August. At the same time, elements of the 53rd Army captured the city of Hamadan. One civilian (a small child) was killed in a small bombing raid, and the sporadic resistance was defeated.

==== Invasion of Northeastern Iran ====
On 25 August, the Soviet Army invaded northeastern Iran from Soviet Turkmenistan. Details of this invasion were not nearly as extensive as details of the others.

Defending Mashhad and Khorasan Province was Iran's 9th Infantry Division, totalling 8,000 troops. They were light infantry, and it was unlikely that they could defend against the more numerous Soviet forces with armour and air power. The Soviet Air Force bombed Mashhad Airport, destroying many Iranian fighter aircraft, along with numerous military barracks. The Soviet forces advanced in three columns across the border.

=== Final phase and outcome ===
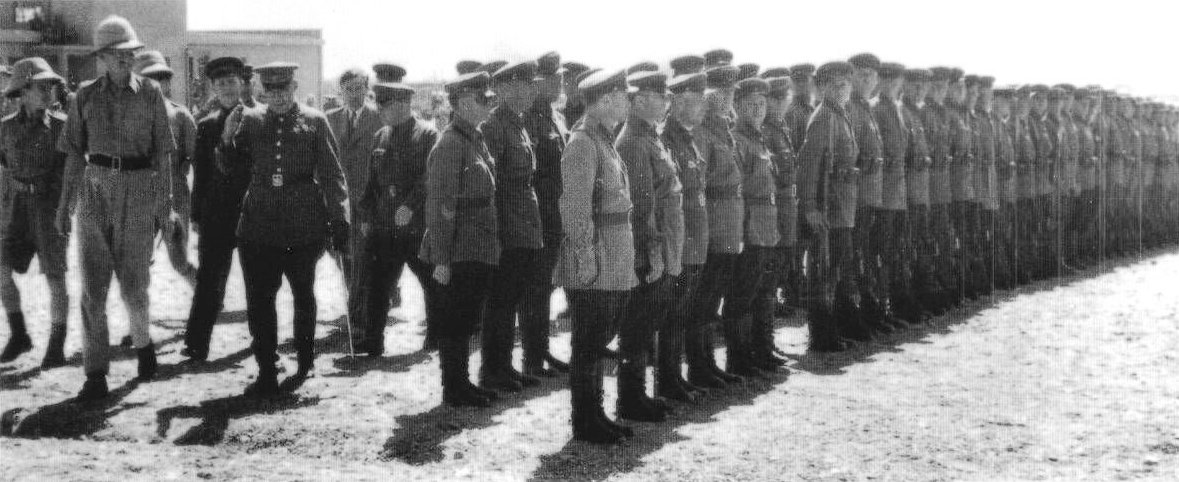
British and Soviet officers inspect troops, in preparations to the Joint Soviet-British military parade in Tehran. Iran, September 1941.

By 28–29 August 1941, the Iranian military situation was in complete chaos. The Allies had complete control over the skies of Iran, and large sections of the country were in their hands. Major Iranian cities (such as Tehran) were suffering repeated air raids. In Tehran itself, the casualties had been light, but the Soviet Air Force dropped leaflets over the city, warning the population of an upcoming massive bombing raid and urging them to surrender before they suffered imminent destruction. Tehran water and food supply had faced shortages, and soldiers fled in fear of the Soviets killing them upon capture. Faced with total collapse, the royal family (except the Shah and the Crown Prince) fled to Isfahan.

The collapse of the army that Reza Shah had spent so much time and effort creating was humiliating. Many of the military generals had behaved incompetently or secretly sympathised with the British and ended up sabotaging the Iranian resistance. The army generals met in secret to discuss surrender options. When the Shah learned of the generals' actions, he beat the head of the armed forces General Ahmad Nakhjavan with a cane and physically stripped him of his rank. He was nearly shot by the Shah on the spot, but at the insistence of the Crown Prince, he was sent to prison instead.

The Shah ordered the resignation of the pro-British Prime Minister Ali Mansur, whom he blamed for demoralising the military. He was replaced with Mohammad Ali Foroughi, a former prime minister. The Shah ordered the Iranian military to end resistance and order a ceasefire. He entered into negotiations with the British and Soviets.

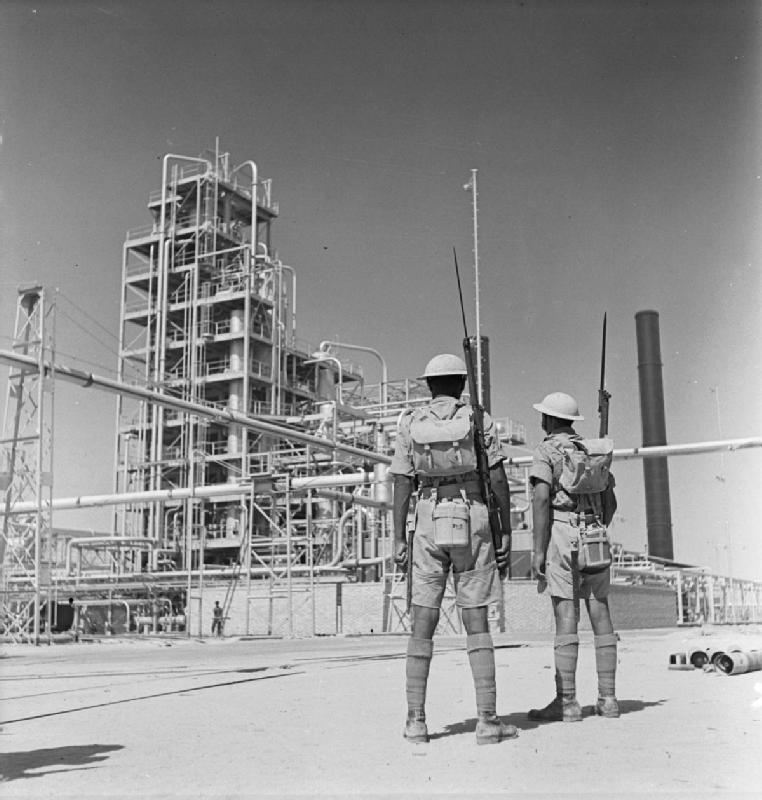
Indian troops guarding the Abadan Refinery in Iran, 4 September 1941

Foroughi was an enemy of Reza Shah (he was forced into retirement in earlier years for political reasons, and his son was executed by firing squad). When he entered into negotiations with the British, instead of negotiating a favourable settlement, Foroughi implied that both he and the Iranian people wanted to be "liberated" from the Shah's rule. The British and Foroughi agreed that for the Allies to withdraw from Iran, the Iranians would have to assure that the German minister and his staff should leave Tehran; the German, Italian, Hungarian and Romanian legations should close and all remaining German nationals (including all families) to be handed over to the British and Soviet authorities. The last order would mean almost certain internment or, in the case of those handed to the Soviets, possible death. Reza Shah delayed on the last demand. Instead, he planned the secret evacuation of all German nationals from Iran. By 18 September, most of the German nationals had escaped via the Turkish border.

In response to the Shah's defiance, the Red Army on 16 September moved to occupy Tehran. Fearing execution by the communists, many people (especially the wealthy) fled the city. Reza Shah, in a letter handwritten by Foroughi, announced his abdication, as the Soviets entered the city on 17 September. The British wanted to restore the Qajar dynasty to power because they had served British interests well prior to Reza Shah's reign. However, the heir to the throne, Hamid Hassan Mirza, was a British citizen who spoke no Persian. Instead, with the help of Ardeshir Reporter, Crown Prince Mohammad Reza Pahlavi took the oath to become the Shah of Iran. Reza Shah was arrested before he was able to leave Tehran, and he was placed into British custody. He was exiled as a British prisoner to British Mauritius for seven months, before being sent to South Africa, where he died in 1944. The Allies withdrew from Tehran on 17 October and Iran was partitioned between Britain and the Soviet Union for the duration of the war, with the Soviets stationed in northern Iran and the British south of Hamadan and Qazvin.

== Occupation ==
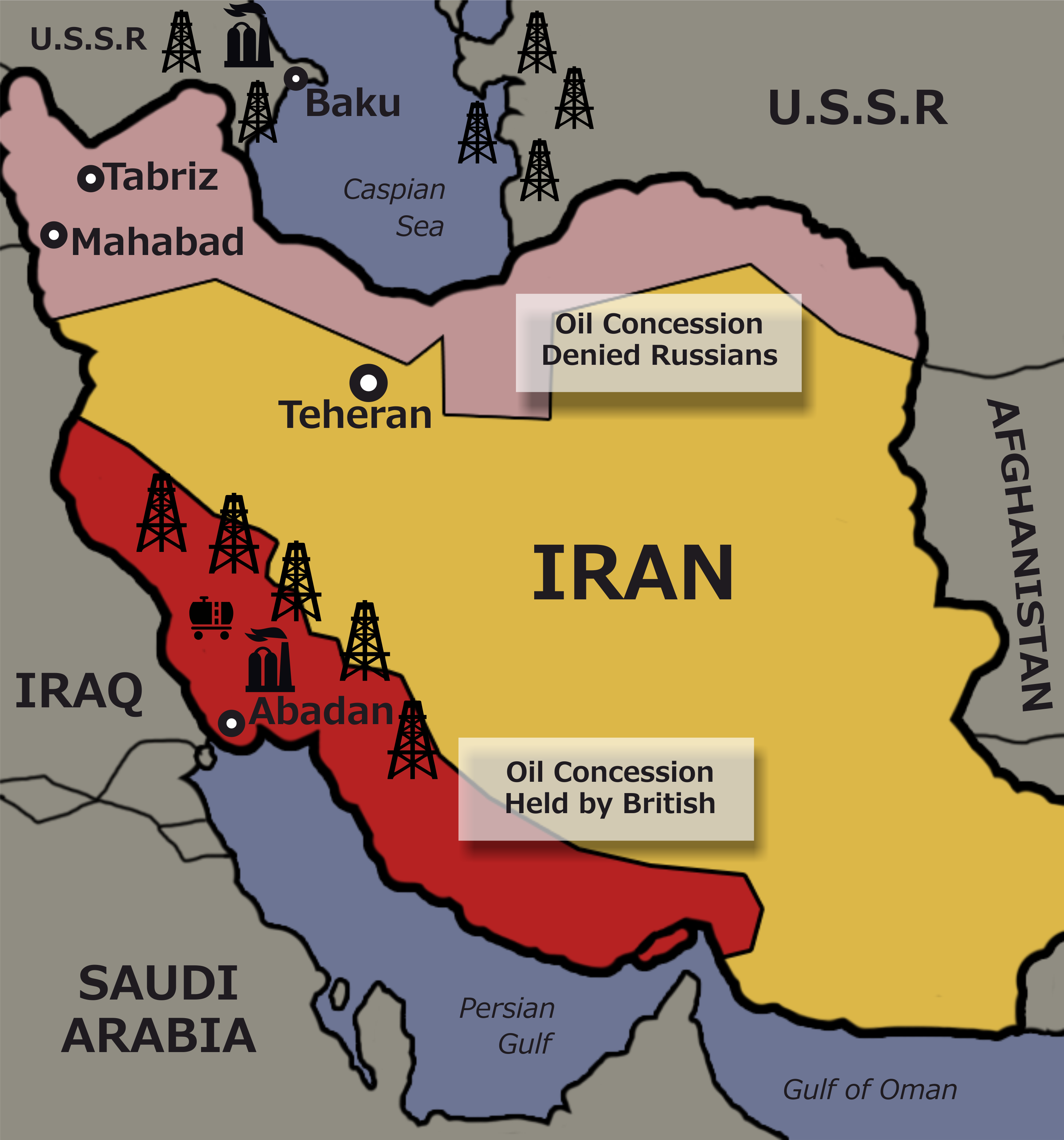
Soviet and British sphere of influence, Iran, 1946

The Persian Corridor became the route for a massive flow of supplies (over 5 million tons of matériel) to the Soviet Union and also the British in the Middle East. At the end of August 1942, German intelligence agents spread leaflets in Tabriz and other cities; an underground fascist organisation called Melnune Iran, was founded. Agents of Melnune Iran instigated anti-government protests in the Lake Urmia region. The Bakhtiari and Qashqai peoples carried out armed resistance against the new government.

The new Shah signed a Tripartite Treaty Alliance with Britain and the Soviet Union on 29 January 1942. This treaty committed the Allies to leaving Iran "not more than six months after the cessation of hostilities". In September 1943, Iran declared war on Germany, which qualified it for membership in the United Nations (UN). At the Tehran Conference in November of that year, Roosevelt, Winston Churchill and Joseph Stalin reaffirmed their commitment to Iranian independence and territorial integrity, with a willingness to extend economic assistance to Iran. The treaty ruled that Iran was not considered to be "occupied" by the Allies, but instead a member of the Allies.

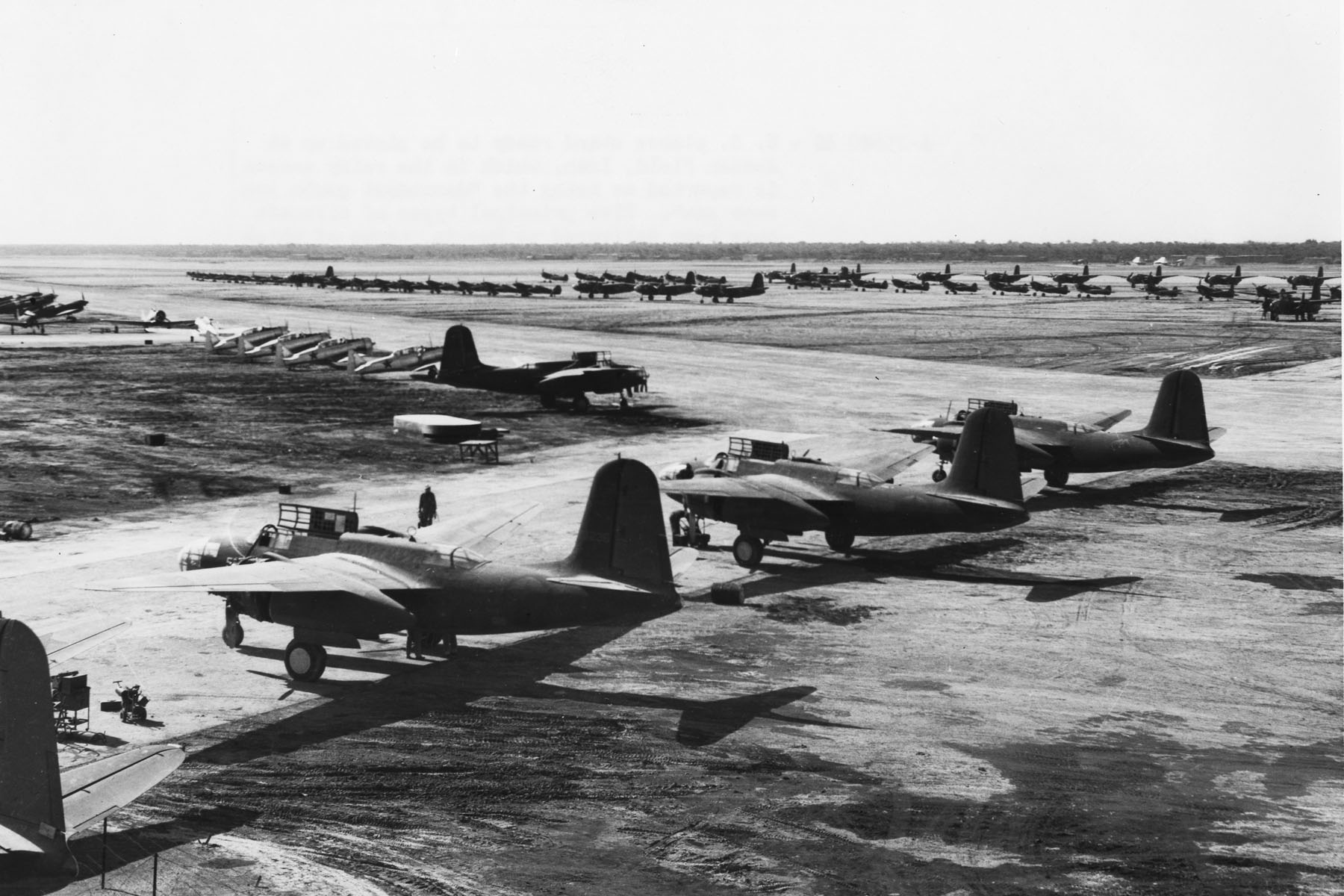
Lend-Lease Program US planes (Douglas A-20 Havoc) stand ready to be picked up at Abadan Air Field, Iran.

The effects of the war were very disruptive for Iran. Much of the state bureaucracy had been damaged by the invasion and food and other essential items were scarce. The Soviets appropriated most of the harvest in northern Iran, leading to food shortages for the general public. The British and Soviet occupiers used the delivery of grain as a bargaining chip and the food crisis was exacerbated because foreign troops needed to eat and use the transport network to move military equipment. The British meanwhile pressured the Shah to appoint Ahmad Qavam to be the prime minister, who proceeded to mismanage the entire food supply and economy. In 1942, bread riots took place in Tehran, martial law was declared and several rioters were killed by the police. Inflation increased by 450 percent, imposing great hardship on the lower and middle classes. In some areas there were famine deaths but there was virtually no armed resistance against the occupation.

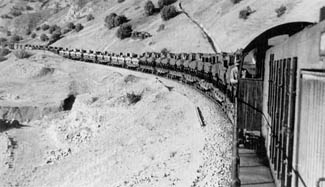
A supply train passing through Iran after the invasion

In 1943, 30,000 Americans helped to man the Persian Corridor and 26–34 percent of the supplies sent to the Soviet Union under the Lend-Lease Act were sent through Iran. The Americans also assuaged Iranian fears of colonisation by the two powers by confirming that they would respect the independence of Iran. The US also extended Lend-Lease assistance to Iran and began to train the Iranian army. Arthur Millspaugh became the finance minister of Iran but ran into much opposition trying to direct Iranian finances.

There were two notable German attempts to undertake operations against the Allies in 1943. In the middle of 1943, Abwehr's Operation François was an attempt to use the dissident Qashqai people in Iran to sabotage British and American supplies bound for the Soviet Union. Also in 1943, Operation Long Jump was, allegedly, an unsuccessful German plot to assassinate the "Big Three" Allied leaders (Stalin, Churchill and Roosevelt) at the Tehran Conference.

== Withdrawal ==
On 12 December 1945, after weeks of violent clashes, a Soviet-backed separatist People's Republic of Azerbaijan was founded. The Kurdish People's Republic was also established in late 1945. Iranian government troops sent to reestablish control were blocked by Red Army units.

When the deadline for withdrawal arrived on 2 March 1946, six months after the end of the war, the British began to withdraw, but Moscow refused, citing "threats to Soviet security". Soviet troops did not withdraw from Iran proper until May 1946, following Iran's official complaint to the newly formed United Nations Security Council, which became the first complaint filed by a country in the UN's history, and a test for the UN's effectiveness in resolving global issues in the aftermath of the war. However, the UN Security Council took no direct steps to pressure the Soviets to withdraw.

== See also ==
- List of British military equipment of World War II
- List of Soviet Union military equipment of World War II
- Anglo-Iraqi War (1941)
- Anglo-Persian Oil Company
- Anglo-Persian War (1856–1857)
- Anglo-Russian Convention of 1907
- Anglo-Soviet Treaty of 1942
- Dunsterforce
- Foreign interventions by the Soviet Union
- History of Iran
- Iranian famine of 1942–1943
- 1941 Iranian legislative election
- Iran-Britain relations
- Iran-Russia relations
- Iraqforce
- Persian Campaign in World War One
- Persian Corridor
- Russo-Persian Wars
- Trans-Iranian Railway
- 1953 Iranian coup d'état

== Sources ==
=== Russian ===
- Гречко/Grechko, А. А. (1976). Годы Войны/Gody voiny, 1941–1943 [The War Years, 1941–1943] (in Russian). Moskva: Voenizdat. OCLC 14013882.
- Басов А. В., Гутенмахер Г. И. Персидский коридор. // Военно-исторический журнал. — 1991. — № 1. — С.25-33.
- Крысин М. В. Индийская армия помогала Закавказскому фронту. // Военно-исторический журнал. — 2004. — № 3. — С.9-10.
- Салихов А. Ш. Красная Армия в Иране. 1941—1944. // Военно-исторический журнал. — 2008. — № 3. — С.17-21.
- Ходеев Ф. П. Советско-английское принуждение Ирана к лояльности в 1941 году. // Военно-исторический журнал. — 2011. — № 9. — С.9-16.

=== English ===
- Abdul-Razak, Rowena (2016). ""But what would they think of us?" Propaganda and the Manipulation of the Anglo-Soviet Occupation of Iran, 1941-46?". Iranian Studies. 49 (5): 817–835. ISSN 0021-0862. JSTOR 26157189.
- Bakhash, Shaul (2016). "Britain and the abdication of Reza Shah". Middle Eastern Studies. 52 (2): 318–334. ISSN 0026-3206. JSTOR 44157683.
- Beaumont, Joan (1981). "Great Britain and the Rights of Neutral Countries: The Case of Iran, 1941". Journal of Contemporary History. 16 (1): 213–228. ISSN 0022-0094. JSTOR 260624.
- Curtis, Caitlin N (2016). "The Policy Regarding Iran: Circumstances Surrounding the Allied Invasion in 1941". Montview Journal of Research & Scholarship. 2 (1). doi:10.70623/FBBR6700.
- Erkan, Süleyman (December 2010). "The Invasion of Iran By The Allies During World War II" (PDF). Codrul Cosminului. 16 (2): 109–132.
- Eshraghi, F. (January 1984). "Anglo-Soviet Occupation of Iran in August 1941". Middle Eastern Studies. 20 (1): 27–52. doi:10.1080/00263208408700570. ISSN 0026-3206. JSTOR 4283013.
- ————— (July 1984). "The Immediate Aftermath of Anglo-Soviet Occupation of Iran in August 1941". Middle Eastern Studies. 20 (3): 324–351. ISSN 0026-3206. JSTOR 4283013.
- Hann, Keith (2013). “A Rush and a Push and the Land is Ours”: Explaining the August 1941 Invasion of Iran (Thesis). University of Calgary. doi:10.11575/PRISM/25000.
- Jackson, Ashley (2018). Persian Gulf Command: A History of the Second World War in Iran and Iraq. Yale University Press.
- Kozhanov, Nikolay A. (2012). "The Pretexts and Reasons for the Allied Invasion of Iran in 1941". Iranian Studies. 45 (4): 479–497. doi:10.1080/00210862.2012.673827. ISSN 0021-0862. JSTOR 23266442.
- Majd, Mohammad Gholi (2012). August 1941: The Anglo-Russian Occupation of Iran and Change of Shahs. Bloomsbury Publishing PLC.
- Mark, Eduard M. (1975). "Allied Relations in Iran, 1941-1947: The Origins of a Cold War Crisis". The Wisconsin Magazine of History. 59 (1): 51–63. ISSN 0043-6534. JSTOR 4635007.
- Roberts, Mervyn (July 2019). "Operation Countenance: The 1941 Invasion of Iran and the Clash of Propaganda Narratives". Iranian Studies. 52 (3–4): 589–610. doi:10.1080/00210862.2019.1628638. ISSN 0021-0862.
- Scheid, Fernande Beatrice (2000). Stalin, Bagirov and Soviet Policies in Iran, 1939–1946 (Thesis). Yale.
- Stewart, Richard A. (1988). Sunrise at Abadan: The British and Soviet Invasion of Iran, 1941. Praeger. ISBN 978-0-275-92793-6.
