= The Orphanage of Iran =

- Directed by: Abolqasem Talebi
- Written by: Abolqasem Talebi
- Based on: The Great Famine and Genocide in Persia by Mohammad Gholi Majd
- Produced by: Mohammad Reza Takhtkeshian
- Starring: Alirum Nouraei; Jafar Dehghan; Farrokh Nemati; Anoushirvan Arjmand; Bahar Mohammadpour; Dariush Asadzadeh; Ali Shadman; Alireza Jalili (actor); Iman Safa; Mohsen Hosseini; Akbar Beheshti; Davood Meghdadi; Majid Mafi; Shahram Teimourian; Melika Shaaban; Mehri Aleagha; Ghotbeddin Sadeghi
- Cinematography: Asghar Rafi Jam
- Edited by: Mehdi Hosseinivand
- Music by: Sergey Krutsenko
- Production company: Ravayat-e Fath Institute
- Distributed by: Filmiran
- Release date: 26 October 2016
- Running time: 120 minutes
- Country: Iran
- Language: Persian
- Budget: Rls.8 billion
- Box office: Rls.1.7 billion

The Orphanage of Iran (Persian: یتیم‌خانه ایران), subtitled "A Historical Account of a Genuine Holocaust in Iran", is a 2016 Iranian action drama film directed by Abolqasem Talebi and set during the Invasion of Iran in World War I and the Persian famine of 1917–1919.

== Cast ==
- Alirum Nouraei as Muhammad-Javad Bonakdar
- Farrokh Nemati as the Doctor
- Bahar Mohammadpour as Muhammad-Javad's wife
- Ali Shademan as Hesam
- Jafar Dehghan as Abdossattar, a Jewish merchant collaborating with the British
- Melika Shaban as A'zam

British personnel

- Paul Dewdney as Major General Lionel Dunsterville
- John O'Toole as Sir Lionel Rothschild
- Tommie Grabiec as Colonel Goldsmith
- Cameron Chapman as Major Smith
- Bryan Torfeh as Lieutenant John Straw
- Toby Hughes as Sir Percy Cox

== Screening ==
In February 2016, the film was screened in the 34th edition of Fajr International Film Festival as one of the few participated in non-competition section. It was released in October 2016. The film was displayed in Buenos Aires in February 2017, in an event co-organized by the Ammar Popular Film Festival and the National Institute of Cinema and Audiovisual Arts.

Miguel Littín the director from Latin America also attended the international Ammar film festival and expressed his opinion about the film:

Although it seems difficult to represent the history, the characters and atmosphere are created in a perfect way and I saw the tone, narration and what we are supposed to see in the history. I got pleasure from the film indeed.

== Reception ==
According to Mehr News Agency, the film is "considered as anti-British work". It had a poor opening, grossing only $10,000 in the first week.

=== Awards and nominations ===
Awards
Award	Year	Category	Recipients and nominees	Result	Ref
19th Iran House of Cinema Celebration	2017	Best Costume Designer	Abbas Bolondi	Won	
19th Iran House of Cinema Celebration	2017	Best Visual Effects	Mohsen Rouzbahani	Nominated	
19th Iran House of Cinema Celebration	2017	Best Sound	Bahman Heidari	Nominated	
19th Iran House of Cinema Celebration	2017	Best Make-up	Daryoush Salehian	Nominated	
14th Resistance Film Festival	2016	Best Movie	Abolqasem Talebi	Won	
14th Resistance Film Festival	2016	Best Actor	Aliram Nouraei	Won	
