= Persian famine of 1870–1872 =

Famine in Qajar era Iran

- Country: Sublime State of Iran
- Period: 1870–1872
- Total deaths: 20–25% of the population or 0.2–6 million people. Majd's claim: 10–12 million people between 1869–1873. (disputed)
- Causes: Government inefficiency, drought, cholera
- Succeeded by: 1917–1919 famine

The Persian famine of 1870–1872 (Note: Some alternative chronologies place the famine between 1869 and 1873. Majd, Mohammad Gholi (2018). A Victorian Holocaust: Iran in the Great Famine of 1869–1873. Bloomsbury Academic. ISBN 978-0-7618-7014-2.) was a period of mass starvation and disease in Iran (Persia) that occurred during the Qajar era.

The best documented famine in Iranian history, it affected almost the whole country. However, some cities, including Shahrud, Kerman, and Birjand, managed to avoid the catastrophe.

According to The New York Herald the famine was caused by an increase in the price of cotton that led Persian farmers to abandon grain farming and to instead plant cotton as a cash crop. Shoko Okazaki attributed the famine to two consecutive years of severe drought, while rejecting the notion that the increase in the production of Persian opium and cotton contributed to the famine. He blamed the effects of the famine on "senior bureaucrats, landlords, grain dealers and high-ranking religious officials who engaged in hoarding and market manipulation".

== Causes and contributing factors ==
Xavier de Planhol comments that the famine was a result of "combined climatic catastrophes made worse by poor administration and the human factors".

The New York Herald attributed the famine to an increase in the price of cotton which made the farmers abandon farming for grains and plant cotton in its place.

Shoko Okazaki maintains that the two consecutive years of severe drought was the principal factor and rejects that the increase in production of opium and cotton contributed to the famine. He also blames "senior bureaucrats, landlords, grain dealers and high-ranking religious officials who engaged in hoarding and market manipulation". Cormac Ó Gráda endorses the latter reason.

== Death toll ==
There is no agreement among scholars as to the total number of deaths during the famine, although it is believed that it resulted a considerable decline in Iran's population.

Among contemporary observers, Frederic John Goldsmid gave the figure of 0.2–0.3 million deaths, while Oliver St. John put the total loss at 0.5 million. James Bassett suggested that 3 million lives were lost and J. Belleu who was travelling in Iran during the period, cited 1.5 million. Badaye-negar, a Persian scholar of the time, estimated 2.5 million deaths.

Fereydun Adamiyat calculates the death toll around 2 million deaths. Another calculation attributes a decline in the estimated population from 10 million in 1850 to 6 million in 1873, to the catastrophe. Gad G. Gilbar's estimation of 1.5 million deaths, which could be between 15% and 20–25% of the population, is acknowledged by Shoko Okazaki and Charles P. Melville.

Iranian historian Mohammad Gholi Majd in his book: A Victorian Holocaust: Iran in the Great Famine of 1869–1873. Claimed that as high as 10–12 million or roughly two-thirds of the population died in the period between 1869–1873 though Majd's methodology has received extensive criticism from other historians.
