= Melika Shaban =

Iranian actress (born 2002)

- ملیکا شعبان
- Born: 21 March 2002 (age 23); Tehran, Iran
- Occupation: Actress
- Years active: 2010–present

Melika Shaban (Persian: ملیکا شعبان; born 21 March 2002) is an Iranian film and television actress. Shaban was born in 2002 in Tehran. She entered this field at the age of 6 and is still active. At the age of five, she completed her acting course at the Iranian School with a full grade, and at the age of 11, she completed her second professional course at the Mehdi Fakhimzadeh School.

== Filmography ==
=== Television series ===
Year	Title	side	Director
2010	Flip	Actor	Mohammad Dermanesh
2010	Atonement	Actor	Shahram Shahhosseini
2010–11	It might happen to you	Actor	Ahmed Moazzami / Masoud Aghababayan
2011	Lead stars	Actor	Mohammad Reza Ahanj
2011	My Girl	Actor	Ismail Jafari
2013	Sounds of Rain	Actor	Hossein Sohilizadeh
2013	Zero hour	Actor	Saeed Soltani
2014	Zahra and Nabat	Actor	Abolfazl Ahmadian
2015	Restless days	Actor	Kazem Masoumi
2020	Prosecutor	Actor	Masoud Dehnamaki

=== Film ===
Year	Title	side	Director
2010	The memory of a rainy night	Actor	Siamak Shayeghi
2011	Birds do not always sing	Actor	Reza Efati
2011	Hearts are aware of emotions	Actor	Jamshid Mahmoudi
2011	Wick and crescent moon	Actor	Arash Moirian
2011	Tears and silence	Actor	Asghar Nasiri
2012	Meeting	Actor	Hojjat Zijudi
2013	Notoriety	Actor	Masoud Dehnamaki
2014	Sense of contact	Actor	Dariush Yari
2014	A Good Day	Actor	Mostafa Khanlaghi
2016	Notoriety 2	Actor	Masoud Dehnamaki
2016	The Orphanage of Iran	Actor	Abolqasem Talebi
