= William Summerill Vanneman =

American medical missionary (1863–1933)

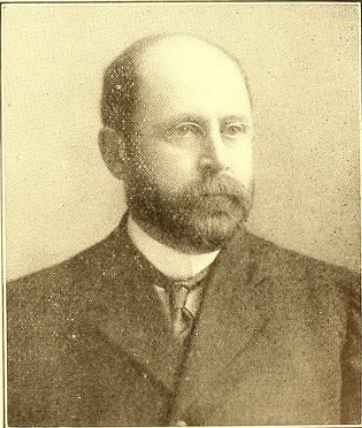
- Born: January 5, 1863; Penns Grove, New Jersey, U.S.
- Died: October 29, 1933 (aged 70); Tabriz, Iran
- Education: Princeton University; University of Pennsylvania
- Known for: Medical and humanitarian relief in Iran
- Spouse: Marguerite Amy Fox (m. 1890)
- Children: 4

William Summerill Vanneman (January 5, 1863 – October 29, 1933) was an American medical missionary. From the fall of 1890 until his death, he worked as a physician in Tabriz, Iran for the Presbyterian mission. Vanneman was appointed as chairman of the relief committee in Tabriz during the Armenian genocide and the Persian famine of 1917-1919. He was awarded the Order of the Lion and the Sun in 1896 by the Shah of Persia.

== Early life ==
Vanneman was born in Penns Grove, New Jersey, to Edwin Alwood Vanneman and Josephine Newell. He attended Salem Collegiate Institute and then studied at Princeton University before attending medical school at the University of Pennsylvania. After receiving his medical degree in 1888, Vanneman became a resident physician at Blockley Almshouse.

On August 21, 1890, Vanneman married Marguerite Amy Fox, who had just graduated from nursing school at Blockley Almshouse. Part of her responsibilities in Tabriz involved traveling to and caring for the leper village. Their children, all born in Tabriz, were: Aimee Sherin, Dorothy Jewett, Irene Wood, and Ruth.

== Mission ==
On May 6, 1890, Vanneman received a commission from the Presbyterian Board of Missions to serve as the replacement physician for George W. Holmes in Tabriz, Iran. He left for Tabriz in September 1890 and joined Mary Bradford who was in charge of treating the female patient population. Vanneman's medical responsibilities involved providing medicines to the general population at the mission's dispensary and making home visits. Apart from his medical responsibilities, Vanneman was the treasurer for the Tabriz and West Persia mission, which included the mission at Urmia.

Former missionaries at the Presbyterian mission in Tabriz included Joseph Plumb Cochran as well as William Levi Whipple, the father of Allen Whipple, whom the Whipple procedure is named after.

Vanneman experienced early opposition from the local Armenian population and Tabriz officials when the mission church and school were ordered to be closed. With time, however, Vanneman would form a strong relationship with the city, and in his 1921 report, Robert Elliot Speer described him as “the best known and most respected citizen of Tabriz”. Vanneman also developed a close relationship with the Shah of Persia, Mozaffar ad-Din Shah Qajar, and in 1896, he served as a physician for the Shah's month-long journey from Tabriz to Tehran.

=== Cholera ===
When the cholera pandemic reached Tabriz in October 1904, Vanneman stayed to keep the mission’s dispensary open and make home visits to cholera patients. By the end of the fall, Vanneman helped build three dispensary wards and an operating room.

=== Persian Revolution ===
During the Persian Constitutional Revolution in 1909, the Shah of Persia, Mohammad Ali Shah Qajar, held Tabriz under siege. As a result of the siege, Vanneman witnessed starvation and an increased number of stomach and intestinal disease cases in the city. Russian forces occupied Tabriz in the ten years that followed the revolution.

=== Russian occupation ===
==== Persian famine ====
In the years spanning the Armenian genocide and the Persian famine between 1915 and 1919, Vanneman was appointed by the U.S. consul in Tabriz to be chairman of the relief committee in Tabriz. In this role, he communicated with Secretary of State Robert Lansing and U.S. Ambassador Henry Morgenthau to manage funds sent by the American Committee for Armenian and Syrian Relief, now known as the Near East Foundation. The committee is the oldest nonsectarian international development organization in the US and the second American humanitarian organization to be chartered by an act of the US Congress.

=== Ottoman occupation ===
When Russian troops left Tabriz in 1918, the Ottoman forces gained control of Tabriz. In the months leading up to the takeover of the city, foreigners were advised to leave the city because they were at risk of becoming hostages. Vanneman, along with several others from the mission, however, remained in Tabriz to keep the mission and its medical services open. On September 8, 1918, Vanneman was arrested by the Turkish troops who desired to gain access to money in the relief funds. Mullahs in Tabriz protested to the Turkish troops against his imprisonment. Vanneman was released 44 days later on October 28, 1918.

In 1921, Vanneman's daughter, Irene Wood Vanneman, joined the Tabriz mission as a missionary teacher.

== Death and legacy ==
Vanneman died from pneumonia in Tabriz, Iran, on October 29, 1933, at the age of 70. For his services to the Shah, he was awarded the Order of the Lion and the Sun.
