= Iranian famine of 1942–1943 =

- Part of Anglo-Soviet occupation of Iran
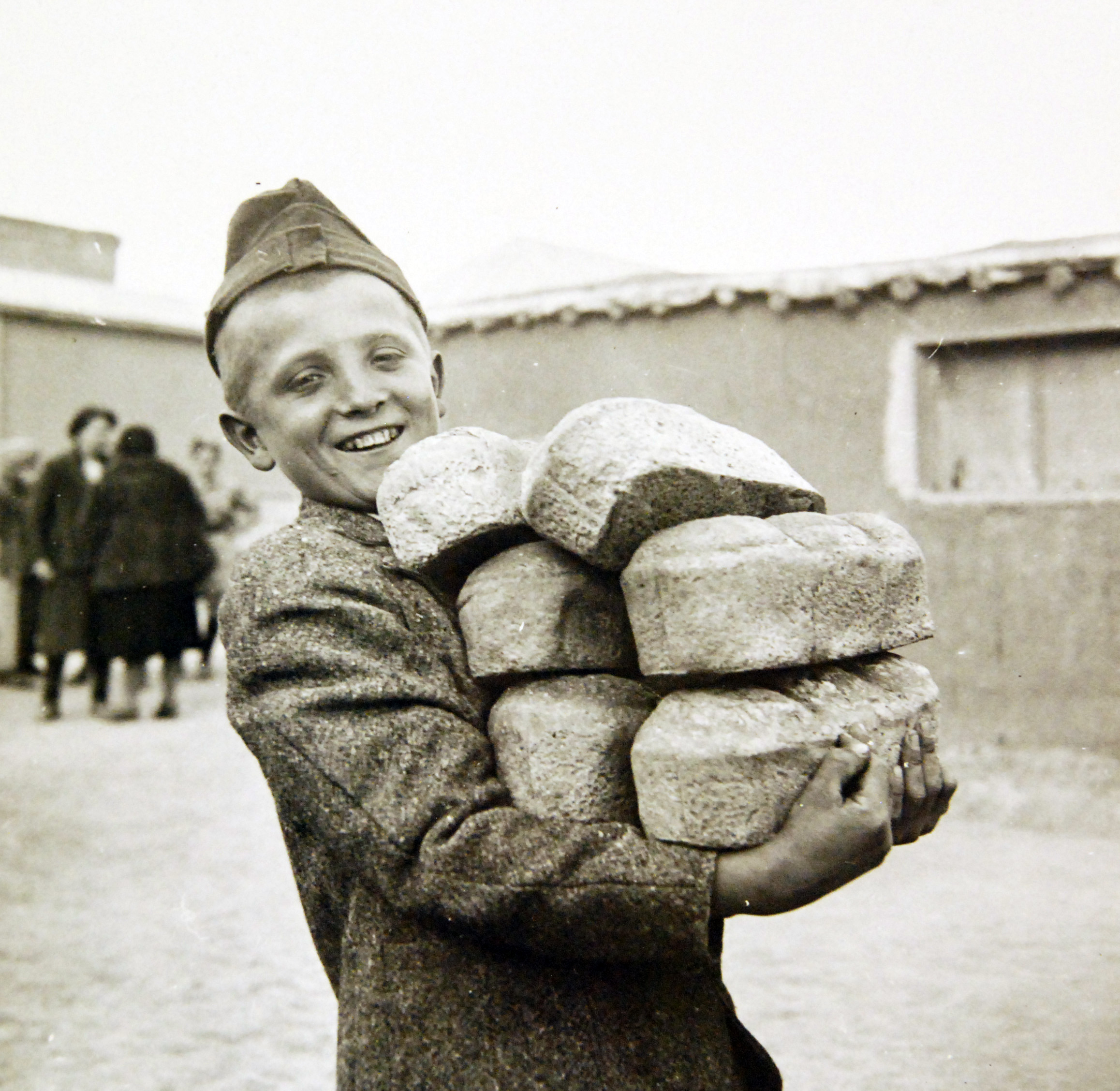
- Polish refugee in Iran carrying bread (1943). Supplying food to Western refugees caused tension at a time when many Iranians were dying of starvation and had no access to food.
- Location: All across Iran; most affected in British Occupation Zone
- Date: 1942–1943
- Deaths: Highly Disputed; estimates range from modest excess mortality to over 4–7 million
- Perpetrators: Soviet Union and United Kingdom

The Iranian famine of 1942–1943 was a period of mass starvation during the Anglo-Soviet occupation of Iran during World War II.

Iran had been invaded in August 1941 by the joint forces of the Soviet Union and United Kingdom despite being a neutral country during World War II, resulting in the collapse of Reza Shah's military, political and social order as well as his deposition and exile. The British preferred to restore a Qajar to the throne but begrudgingly accepted the 21 year-old Mohammad Reza Pahlavi after finding no suitable Qajar candidates. Despite this, Mohammad Reza Pahlavi would exercise no real power in Iran until the end of the occupation five years later.

In order to transport oil and other supplies to the Soviet Union, the Allies took control of the Trans-Iranian Railway and forcibly contracted half of Iran's publicly and privately owned trucks, thus controlling 75 percent of the country's food distribution capacity within months of the invasion. Compounded by a bad harvest, famine began in earnest and spread rapidly thereafter.

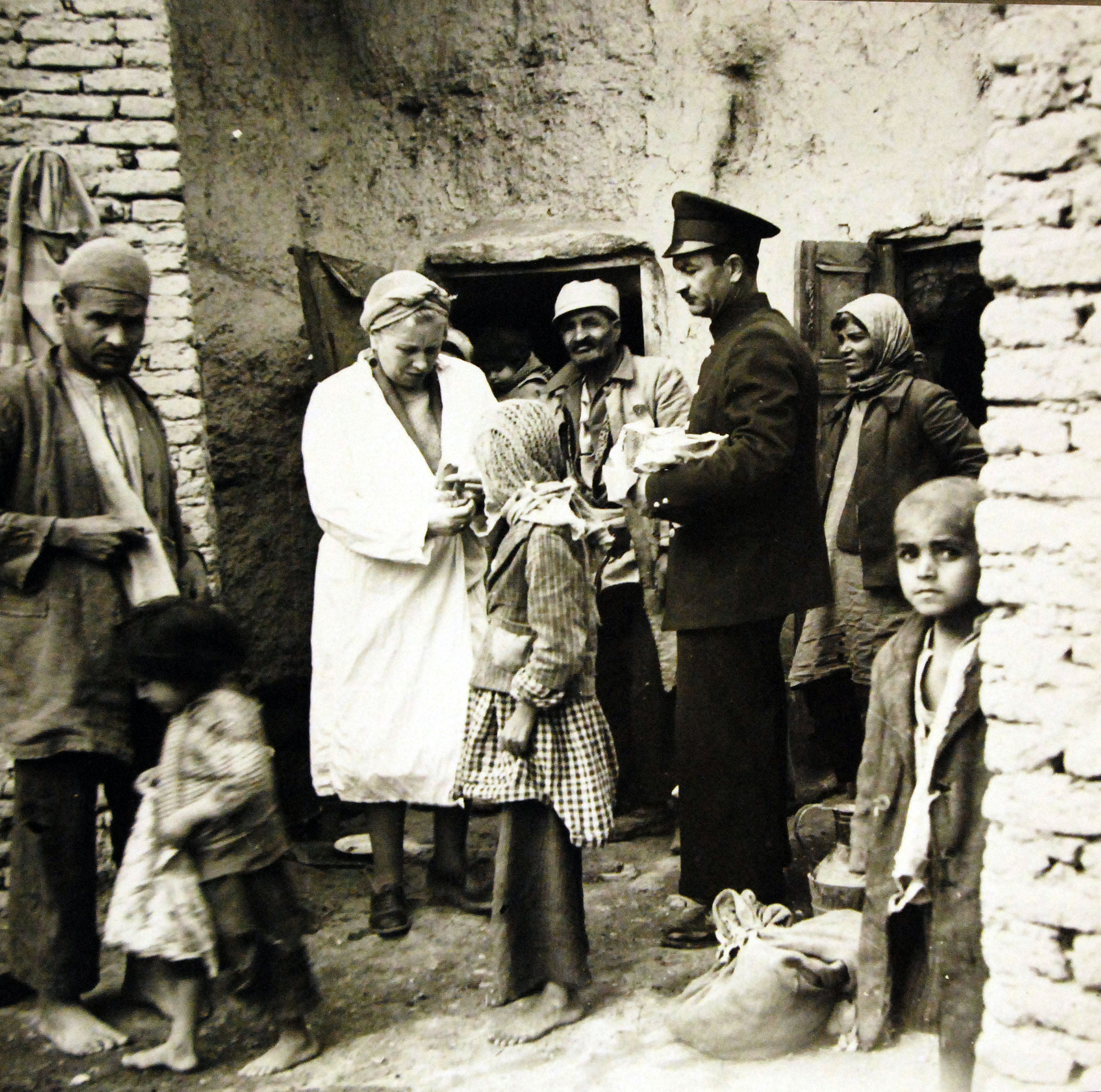
Grace Dreyfus, wife of Louis G. Dreyfus, distributes food in Tehran (1943)

Initial American relief efforts fell through when the American ambassador Louis G. Dreyfus reported to Washington that Iran was not suffering from a serious famine and insisted that it should not be prioritized above the broader war effort against the Axis powers. In many cities, including the capital of Tehran, Iranians organized mass protests against the Allied forces, accusing them not only of causing the mass famine and inflation, but also of looting the country. These protests were suppressed by authorities under British-backed Prime Minister Ahmad Qavam.

The famine during the Anglo-Soviet occupation contributed to growing anti-Western sentiment in Iran, which, along with subsequent interventions like the 1953 coup, would later inform anti-Western rhetoric during the Iranian Revolution.

== Events ==
The British and the Soviets tried to strengthen their influence in their respective zones. The allies took control of the Trans-Iranian Railway and contracted half of Iran's publicly and privately owned trucks, thus occupying 75 percent of the country's food distribution capacity in the midst of the 1941 harvest. The remaining transportation capacities were quickly rendered unusable because of a restriction of the import of spare parts. That disrupted internal trade and social services and increased the cost of living by more than 700%. After a bad harvest in 1942, famine struck the British-occupied south. The British administration promised to supply the needed amount of grain, but failed to do so, and when the Iranian government turned to the United States for help, promised aid never substantiated even after months-long negotiations. The U.S. diplomat Louis G. Dreyfus initially reported to the US government that the food situation was serious, but he soon uttered doubts about any wheat shortage and recommended that the U.S. should support "the British stand and insist on Iran helping itself before relying on Allied imports".

The British government blamed the situation on hoarding, inefficient distribution and an inadequate transport system, but Washington suspected that the British had deliberately manipulated the food supply to further their own political objectives. Meanwhile, the Soviets banned food shipments from the north, claimed that they needed the resources for the people and soldiers fighting the Germans, and blamed British mismanagement for the famine since no similar conditions existed in the Soviet-held areas. However, officials who visited Iran before the invasion noted that Iranians already had food shortages nationwide.

In April 1941, the American consul had traveled in eastern, central and southern Iran and noted the conditions:

"I think the most striking feature of the trip was the scarcity of food throughout the country. With one unimportant exception, every place on the route was short of food, and in many, no bread whatever was available… The Iranian authorities did not restrict the exportation of foodstuffs after a severe shortage in 1940; and there is slight reason to believe that the shortage now will make them more prudent in the future. In fact, grain monopoly agents were collecting grain in the region about Bojnord when I passed through, for export to Germany via the Soviet Union."

In August 1941, on the eve of the Allied invasion, the average wage was 8 rials per day:

"Thus it will be seen that the wage is insufficient even for food for a family and most workers have a starvation diet… It is not possible to buy adequate clothing or even to dream of luxuries such as education of the children."

However, letters and diplomatic correspondence at the time presented all sides being at fault. This included the role of corrupt distributors.

Shortages affected Iran most severely, and an unseemly blame game ensued as to who was responsible. The British blamed incompetent Iranian distribution, the Americans blamed the callous British as well as bungling Iranians and the Iranians blamed all three allies. There was some truth to the positions of all sides. The bottom line was that the allies were directly responsible for wheat shortages. Article 7 of the Treaty of Alliance that legitimised the occupation required Britain and the Soviet Union to protect the Iranian people against the "privations and difficulties" of the war. But invasion and the shah's subsequent abdication destroyed Iran's old political and economic structures and failed to provide a viable replacement. The occupiers purchased or confiscated large amounts of Iranian food, and the food requirements of the 100,000 plus allied soldiers garrisoned and working in Iran were only partially met from outside. Tehran’s major source of wheat was Azerbaijan, yet Soviet officials acquired 50 per cent of their grain needs from the province, allowing only 300 tons of Azerbaijani wheat to be shipped to Tehran from March 1942 to March 1943. In addition, Soviet occupation policies caused 200,000 Iranians to flee to Tehran, swelling its population and food needs by 37 per cent.

Louis Dreyfus told Washington that the Iranian prime minister had spoken of the widespread dissatisfaction in the parliament regarding the manner in which Britain and the Soviet Union were carrying out their treaty with Iran: "Members complain bitterly that Russians are taking their cattle, that Poles are being dumped in Iran, that the British are failing to provide food and are sending Iranian wheat to Iraq, that Russians are exploiting the situation in northern Iran, that the British are taking advantage of Iran in financial and other matters and that Iranians are being generally deceived and exploited.

Reader Bullard's letters and diplomatic correspondence present British authorities as less callous than they were often portrayed both at the time and in the subsequent historiography. What is more, contemporary files indicate that the British were less omnipotent than they have often been depicted subsequently. The diplomat Harold Eeman wrote that the Soviet occupation deprived Iran's more arid provinces – which were in the British zone – of their usual supply of cereals, shortages that were subsequently and predictably being blamed on the British authorities. "This was grossly unfair," Eeman wrote, "since the British Army, apart from feeding its own troops, provided bread for thousands of Polish refugees from Russia living in camps near Tehran, and distributed flour to the Iranians themselves whenever actual famine threatened."

The Iranian public accused the Allies of looting the country and pushing Iran into inflation and starvation. In December 1942, demonstrations against the scarcity of food became a daily occurrence in Tehran and eventually led to riots.

After nearly two weeks, Prime Minister Ahmad Qavam ordered the police to quell the protests with deadly force, resulting in a number of deaths and injuries on both sides. During the final months of 1942 and in 1943, the streets of Kermanshah were full of semi-naked and hungry people with fifteen deaths attributed to hunger and poverty occurring every day. In February 1943, typhus broke out in the city and the hospital was closed down because of widespread infection among doctors and staff. Only in 1943, the Soviets released 25,000 tons of grain to ameliorate the situation.

The impact of World War II on Iran is acknowledged by the United States Holocaust Memorial Museum. In the entry in the Holocaust Encyclopedia on "Iran During World War II," the following is stated:

The impact of World War II on Iran was devastating. Iranian neutrality was ignored and the country lost its de facto independence to occupying forces. The British and Soviet authorities dominated the use of major roadways and the Trans-Iranian Railroad for their own purposes, and sequestered and deployed Iranian manpower and equipment for the war effort. With few resources left for farming, combined with a bad harvest in 1942 and an enormous influx of European refugees, famine spread and many people died.

== Death toll ==
The death toll and nature of the famine, along with the preceding one during World War I that also occurred under British occupation, has been disputed in academia.

The famine in Iran during World War II has been notably under-explored by Western scholarship. For example, a 1968 demographic study by Julian Bharier in the journal Population Studies deals with the time period in passing, but merely alludes to the war imposing additional hardships on Iranians, observing that "1946 is the first year after World War II when Iran began to find its feet again after the Allied occupation." Apart from that, Bharier makes no mention of the famine. To the contrary, Bharier cites figures from Iran's Civil Registration Office (C.R.O.) postulating a 2% annual population growth rate during the years 1942–1945, which is higher than the average 1.5% growth rate estimated by demographer Mehdi Amani for the entire period 1926–1945. Bharier was cited in a 2019 article by Cormac Ó Gráda analyzing World War II-era famines, although even here the Iranian famine is only mentioned in a single sentence; "the death toll, though unknown, was probably modest."

Dr. M.G Madjd, having earned a PhD in agricultural economics from Cornell University, wrote the very first serious English-language study of the famine. In the Journal of Iranian Islamic Period History, Majd concluded that 3–4 million Iranians—a quarter of the population—died of starvation and disease during the Allied occupation in World War II, citing U.S. State Department population figures for 1941 (15 million) and 1944 (10–12 million).

Since then, Majd has estimated that the deaths were greater than previously thought. Now arguing that 5–7 million people died between the period of 1941–1945.

== See also ==
- Water scarcity in Iran
- Iranian economic crisis
- Persian famine of 1917–1919
