= Near East Foundation =

American international development organization

- Formation: 1915
- Type: 501(c)(3)
- Headquarters: Syracuse, New York, U.S.
- Website: neareast.org

The Near East Foundation (NEF) is an American international social and economic development organization based in Syracuse, New York. The NEF had its genesis in a number of earlier organizations. As the scope of relief expanded from aid to Greek, Armenian and Assyrian victims of the Ottoman Empire to post-World War I relief in the region, the names and mission changed. The inception was as the American Committee on Armenian Atrocities, followed by American Committee for Armenian and Syrian Relief (ACASR), then American Committee for Relief in the Near East (ACRNE), before becoming Near East Relief in August 1919. In 1930 as the relief work diminished and development work expanded, the organization reorganized as the Near East Foundation.

The NEF is the United States' oldest nonsectarian international development organization and the second American humanitarian organization to be chartered by an act of Congress. Near East Relief organized the world's first large-scale, modern humanitarian project in response to the unfolding Armenian and Assyrian genocides.

Known as the Near East Foundation since 1930, NEF pioneered many of the strategies employed by the world's leading development organizations. In the past 100 years NEF has worked with partner communities in more than 40 countries.

== Focus ==
NEF is an operational NGO with projects in Armenia, Jordan, Lebanon, Mali, Morocco, the West Bank, Senegal, Sudan, and Syria. In these countries, it works with disadvantaged social groups including people coping with conflict, displacement, exclusion and climate change. The organization focuses on three program areas that are aimed at addressing development challenges in the long-term: peacebuilding, sustainable agriculture and natural resource management and microenterprise development. It is structured to work with local partners to deliver services. NEF's partners include local and international non-governmental organizations, bilateral and multilateral donors, foundations, financial institutions and government ministries.

== History ==
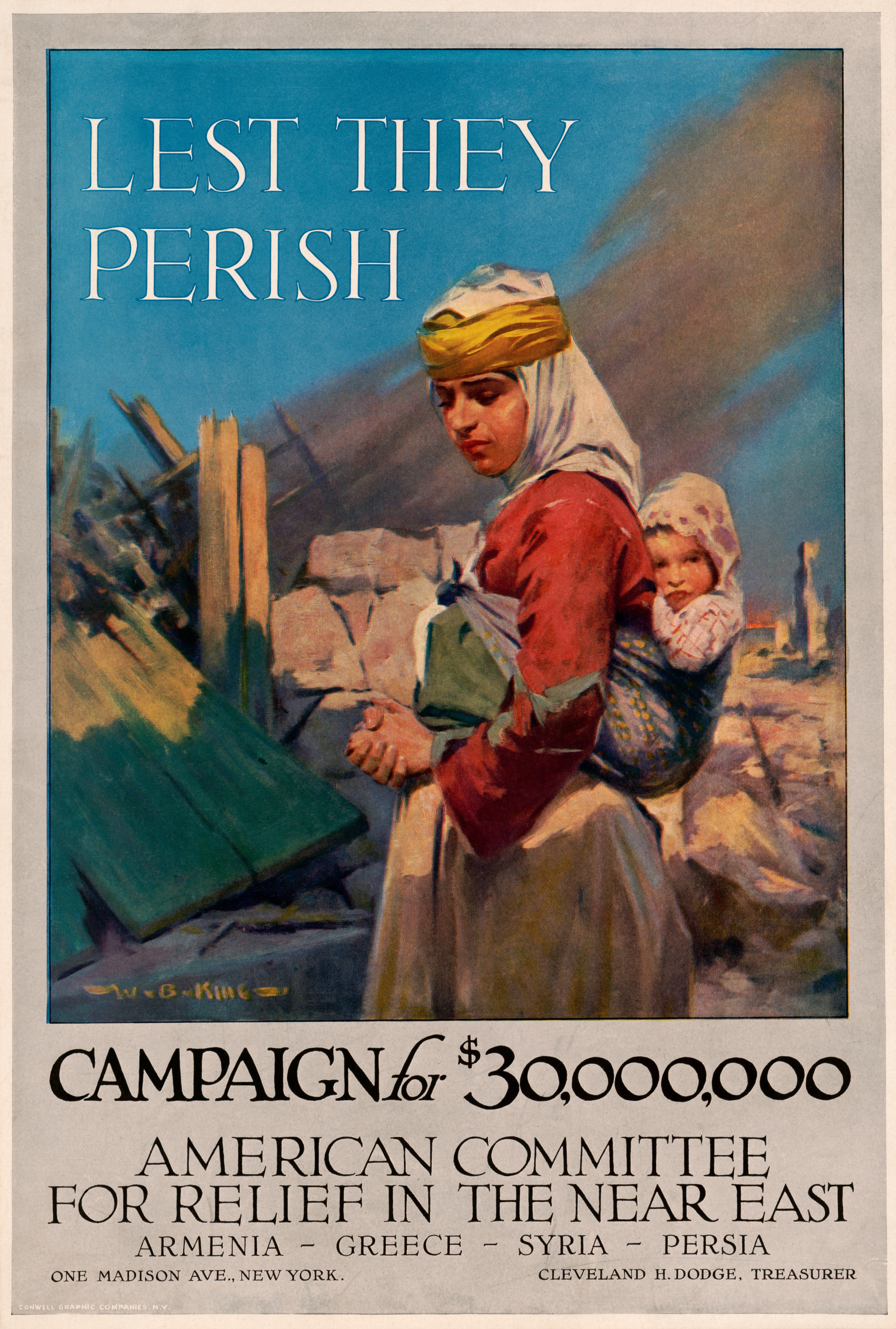
Lest they perish campaign poster of the American Committee for Relief in the Near East

The earlier organizations began in response to Ambassador Henry Morgenthau Sr.'s 1915 reports of governmental atrocities against Ottoman Armenians. Morgenthau referenced the deportations of intellectuals and requested urgent and immediate assistance. Former missionary and educator James Levi Barton and philanthropist Cleveland Hoadley Dodge led a group of prominent New Yorkers in forming the American Committee for Armenian and Syrian Relief, each with personal connections to the Near East.

The Committee raised $60,000 for direct relief at its first meeting on September 16, 1915. The money was wired to Ambassador Morgenthau for distribution by William Summerill Vanneman, the chairman of the Committee in Tabriz, Russia. Cleveland H. Dodge personally financed the committee's operating expenses in order to ensure that all funds went to direct relief.

The Committee then embarked upon an unprecedented grassroots campaign to raise money and awareness across the United States. The campaign combined striking imagery, passionate celebrity spokespeople, and captivating stories from the field to inspire Americans from all economic backgrounds to become citizen philanthropists. The organization briefly used the name American Committee for Relief in the Near East in 1918–1919 as seen on many of the committee's iconic posters.

In August 1919, the Committee received a congressional charter (the second humanitarian organization to receive this recognition, after the American Red Cross) and was renamed Near East Relief.

From 1915 to 1930, Near East Relief saved the lives of over a million refugees, including 132,000 orphans who were cared for and educated in Near East Relief orphanages.

Near East Relief mobilized the American people to raise over $116 million for direct relief. Nearly 1,000 U.S. citizens volunteered to travel overseas.

Near East Relief workers built hundreds of orphanages, vocational schools, and food distributions centers. Overseas relief workers were responsible for the direct care of orphans and refugees, including the organization of vast feeding and educational programs. Thousands of Americans volunteered throughout the U.S. by donating money or supplies and hosting special events to benefit Near East Relief's work.

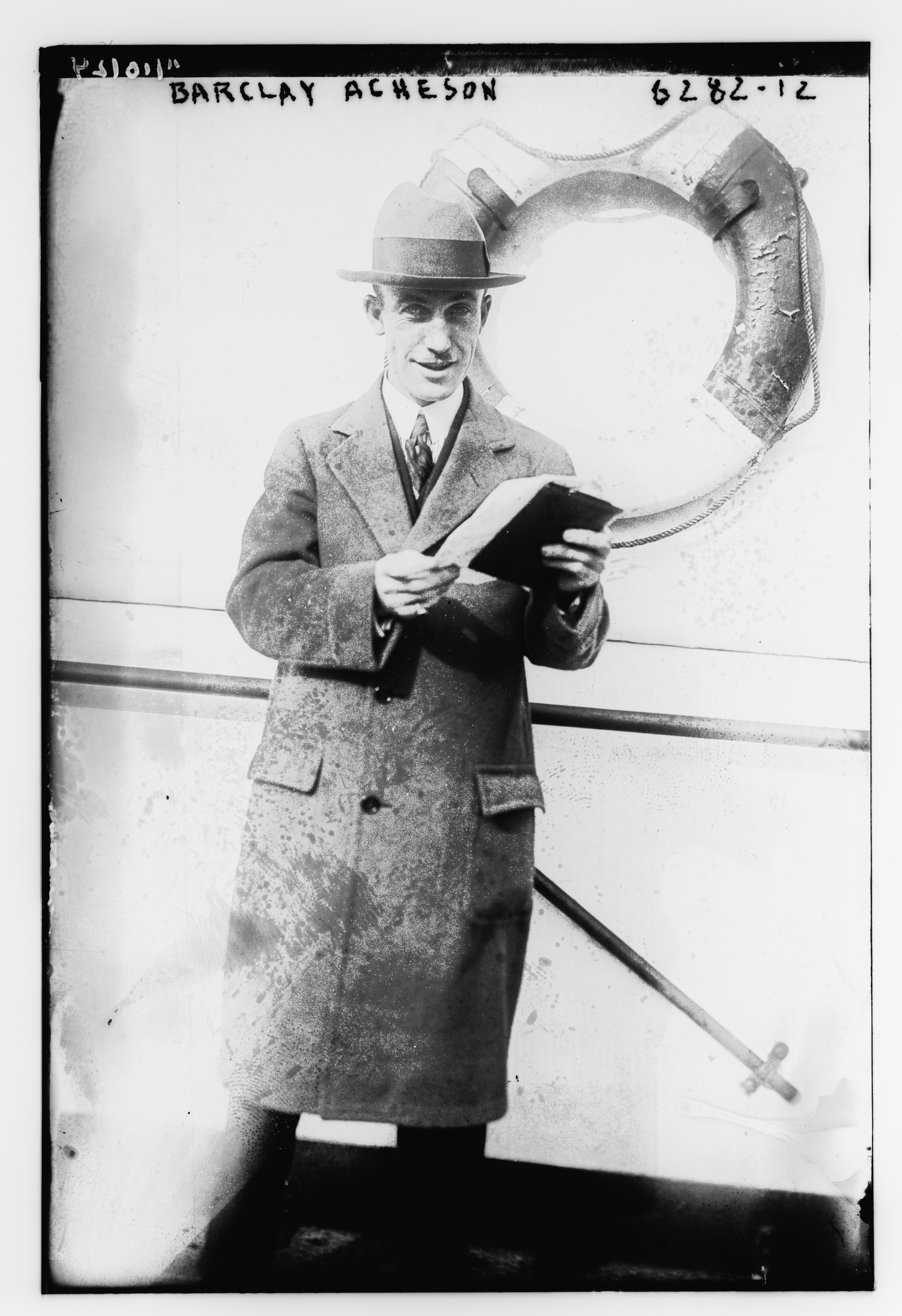
Director Barclay Acheson in 1924

The Golden Rule Sunday

The organization created the International Near East Association, which then dedicated Sunday, December 2, 1923, as an International Sunday of the Golden Rule. The "Golden Rule Sunday" as it became known, encouraged people to eat something simple—namely staple menus typically served in orphanages—and offer the money they saved as a donation to the orphans of the Armenian Genocide. The Sunday of the Golden Rule was celebrated in many parts of Europe, Australia, and America. President Calvin Coolidge urged the American people to express a spirit of sacrifice and generosity on December 2, 1923, as part of the larger philanthropic effort.

In 1930, Near East Relief was renamed the Near East Foundation (NEF) to reflect the organization's shift in focus from emergency relief to long-term social and economic development. NEF expanded its geographic focus to include North Africa, sub-Saharan Africa, and the area now known as the Middle East.

NEF launched the Near East Relief Historical Society in 2014 in an effort to preserve and share the organization's history.

== Impact ==
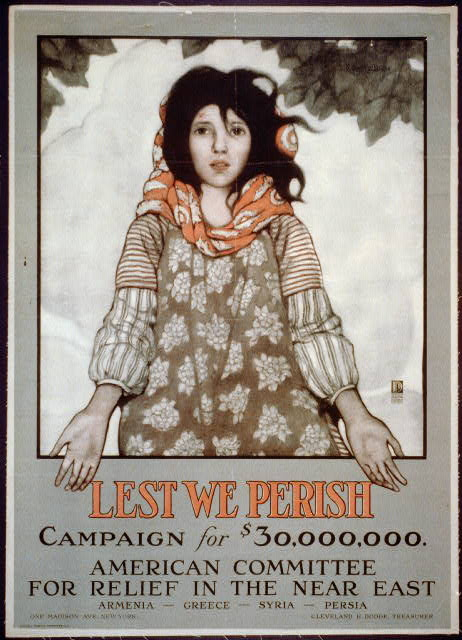
Lest we perish campaign poster of the American Committee for Relief in the Near East

The relief effort that launched the organization in 1915 was the first broad national appeal of its kind to solicit funds from the American public, and it was unique in its use of media outlets and support from celebrity spokespeople and citizen volunteers alike. This effort grew and gave birth to what is now known as "citizen philanthropy"—appealing directly to the public to support humanitarian work overseas. This model of philanthropy is used today by a majority of non-profit organizations around the world.

When NEF established the practice of working in tandem with foreign governments and local organizations to improve the lives of citizens, it was nearly unprecedented. NEF has since provided the model for many of today's well-known development organizations, including the U.S. Agency for International Development and the Peace Corps. It has also left a legacy of enduring development institutions it had helped create that continue as centers of innovation and service, including the American University of Beirut's Faculty of Agriculture and Food Science, American University in Cairo's Desert Development Center, Agricultural College of Rezaiye and Ahwaz Agricultural College in Iran, Center for Development Services in Egypt, and dozens of others. As an example of its legacy, one of the oldest basketball teams in Greece, Near East B.C. took its name in order to honor the foundation, since it helped Greeks refugees after the Convention Concerning the Exchange of Greek and Turkish Populations.

== Partnership with Syracuse University ==
In 2010, the Near East Foundation moved its headquarters to Syracuse University in Syracuse, New York. At Syracuse University, NEF engages faculty and students in its international development work through strategic partnerships with the Maxwell School of Citizenship and Public Affairs, the S.I. Newhouse School of Public Communications, and the Whitman School of Management. NEF works frequently with experts in the Program for the Advancement of Research on Conflict and Collaboration.

== Affiliates ==
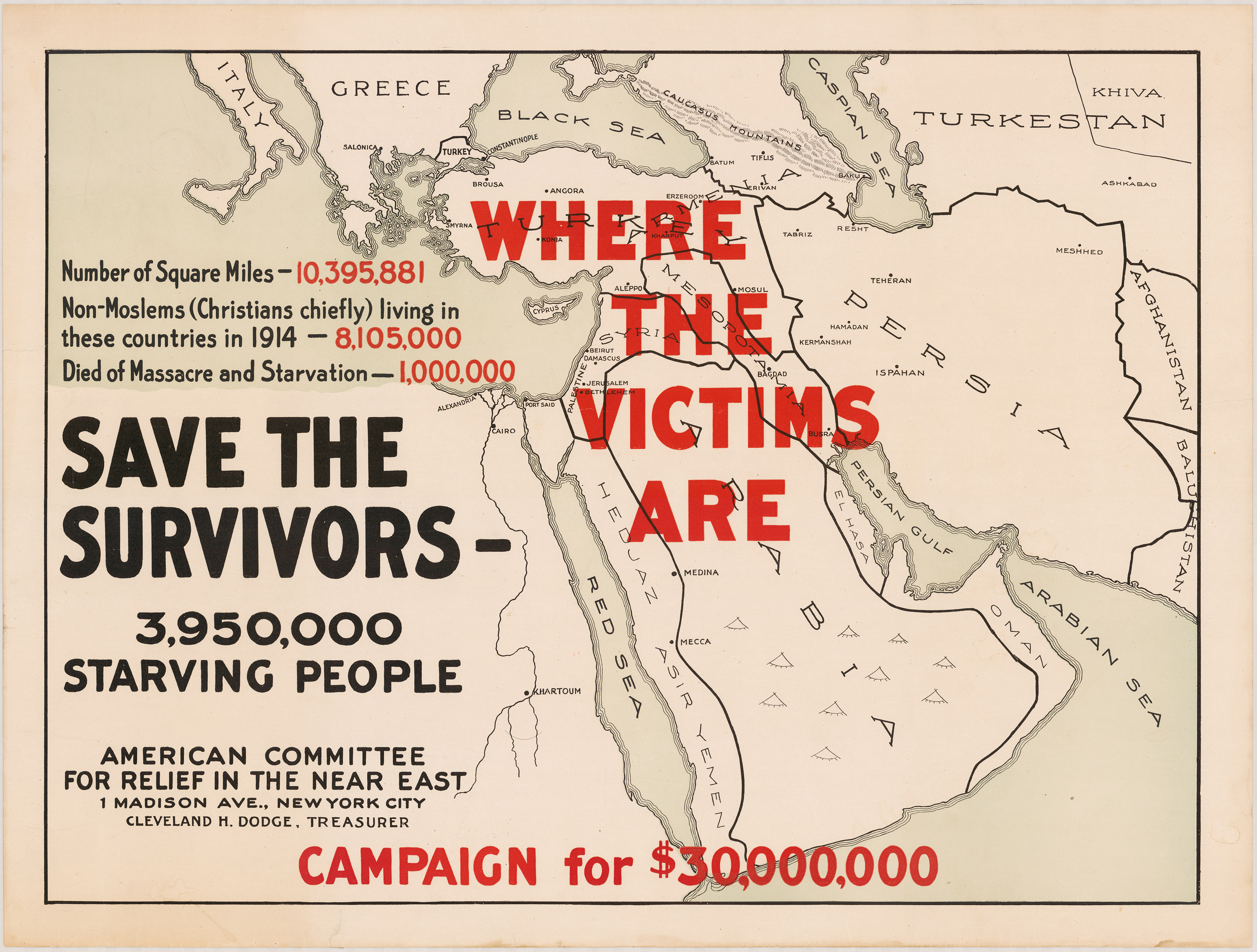
This poster is part the special campaign of the American Committee "Near East Relief" in 1918.

- Near East Foundation – Armenia
- Near East Foundation – Jordan
- Near East Foundation – Lebanon
- Near East Foundation – Mali
- Near East Foundation – Morocco
- Near East Foundation – Palestine
- Near East Foundation – Sudan
- Near East Foundation – United Kingdom
- Near East Relief Historical Society
- World Service Commission

== See also ==
- NEF is a non-governmental organization and a private voluntary organization.
- Mabel Evelyn Elliott, physician
