= Blériot-SPAD S.42 =

1920s French training aircraft

S.42
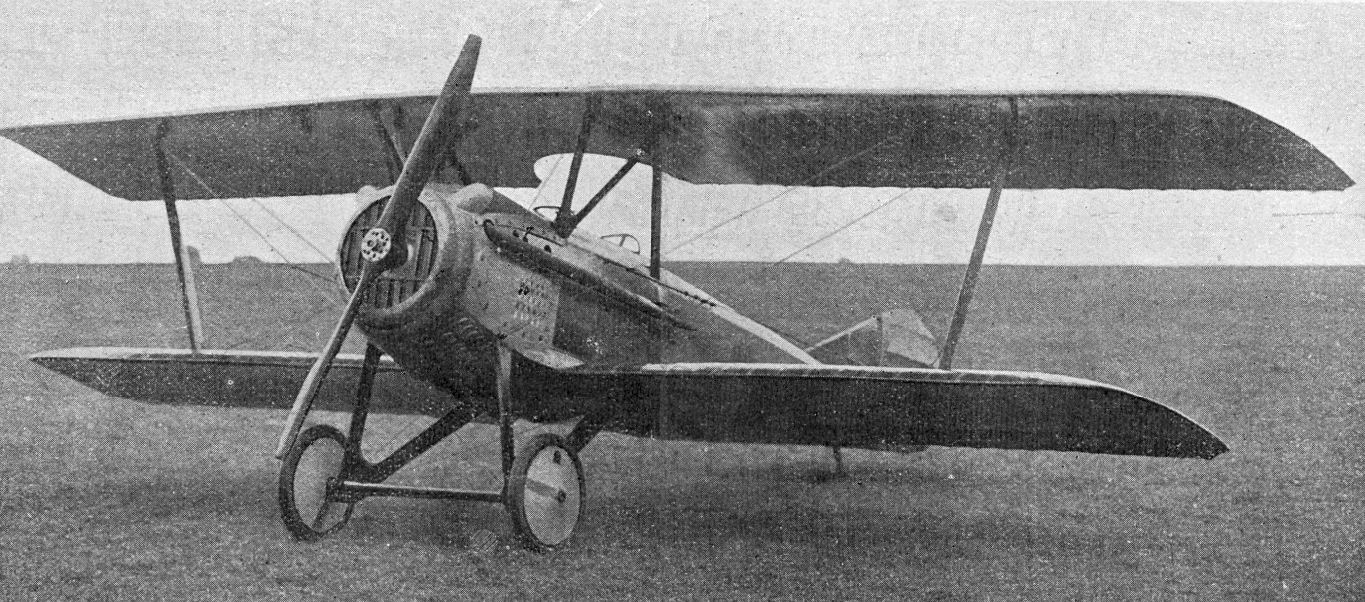

General information
- Type: biplane trainer
- National origin: France
- Manufacturer: SPAD
- Designer: Louis Béchéreau
- Primary user: Aéronautique Militaire
- Number built: 10

History
- First flight: 6 August 1921

The SPAD S.42 was a French biplane trainer aircraft of the early 1920s, developed by Société Pour L'Aviation et ses Dérivés (SPAD) from prolific SPAD S.XIII fighter.

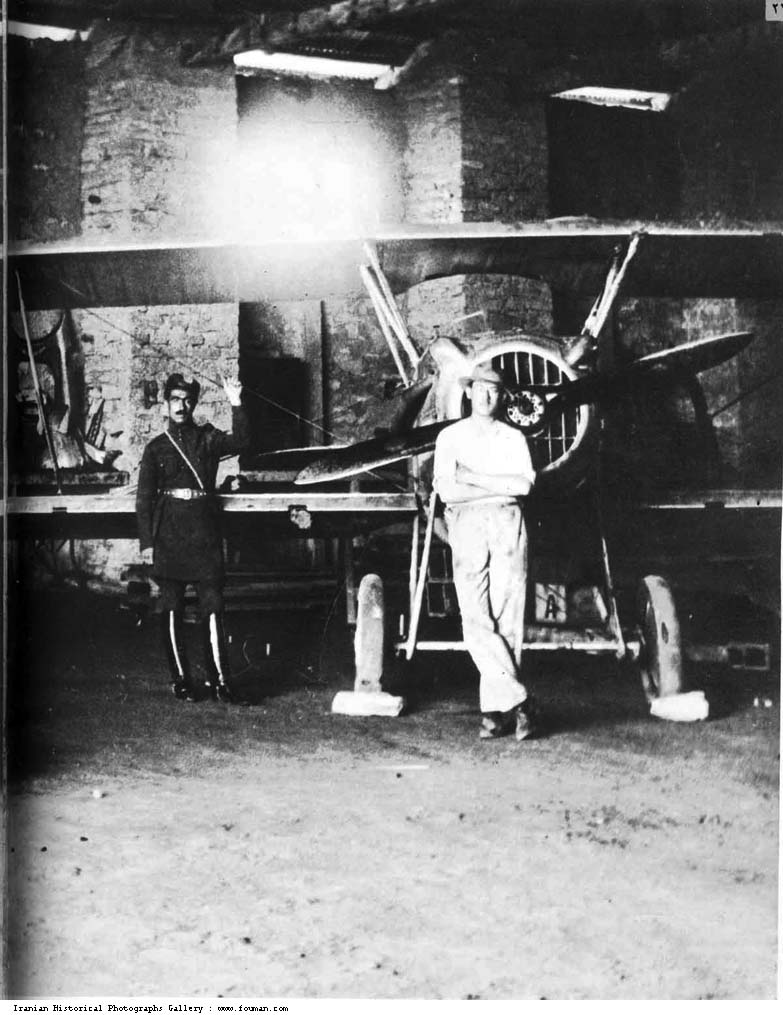
One of the S.42s at Doshan Tappeh airfield, near Tehran, in Iran

== Operators ==
France

- Aeronautical Service

Iran

- Imperial Iranian Air Force

2 operational aircraft reported in a British report on July 1st, 1925 (stored in India Office Records collection of documents). Only a few photographs remain.

== Specifications ==
Data from

General characteristics

- Crew: 1
- Length: 6.77 m (22 ft 3 in)
- Wingspan: 8.65 m (28 ft 5 in)
- Height: 2.65 m (8 ft 8 in)
- Wing area: 22.12 m^{2} (238.1 sq ft)
- Empty weight: 685 kg (1,510 lb)
- Gross weight: 1,056 kg (2,328 lb)
- Powerplant: 1 × Hispano-Suiza 8Ab V-8 water-cooled piston engine, 130 kW (180 hp)

Performance

- Maximum speed: 175 km/h (109 mph, 94 kn)
- Range: 450 km (280 mi, 240 nmi)
- Service ceiling: 5,500 m (18,000 ft)

== Bibliography ==
- Andersson, Lennart (July 1998). "Histoire de l'aéronautique persane, 1921–1941: La première aviation du Chah d'Iran" [History of the Persian Air Force, 1921–1941: The First Aircraft of the Shah of Iran]. Avions: Toute l'aéronautique et son histoire (in French) (76): 2–12. ISSN 1243-8650.
