= Abolqasem Talebi =

Abolghasem Talebi
- ابوالقاسم طالبی
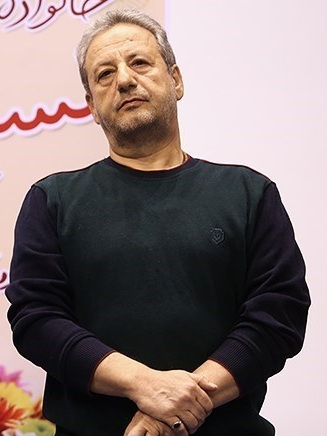
- Born: 1961 (age 64–65); Isfahan, Iran
- Occupations: Film director; screenwriter; film producer
- Years active: 1995–present
- Notable work: The Orphanage of Iran

Abolqasem Talebi (Persian: ابوالقاسم طالبی; born 1961) is an Iranian film director and screenwriter. He is a former intelligence officer.

== Filmography ==
=== Director ===
- The Orphanage of Iran - 2016
- The Golden Collars - 2012
- Dasthay-e khali - 2007
- Arus-e afghan - 2004
- Naqmeh - 2002
- Mr. President - 2000
- Bazgasht-e Parastooha (TV series) - 1998
- Virangar - 1995

=== Writer ===
- The Orphanage of Iran - 2016
- The Golden Collars - 2012
- Dasthay-e khali - 2007
- Mr. President - 2000
- Bazgasht-e Parastooha (TV series) - 1998
- Virangar - 1995

== Allegations of sexual misconduct ==
In February 2023, the Twitter account affiliated with the MeToo movement in Iran published the story of three people who claimed they were sexually harassed by Talebi. Actress Baharak Salehnia said that during the filming of The Orphanage of Iran, Talebi asked her to talk about menstruation and sexual intercourse during menstruation. Another person said that Talebi asked her, "You don't know how to turn someone on or you don't know what it is to turn on?" before adding, "You came to take the test and took my time." In another story, it was claimed that women could not bring mobile phones and electronic devices with them when they entered Talebi's office.

== See also ==
- Persian cinema
