= Yann Richard =

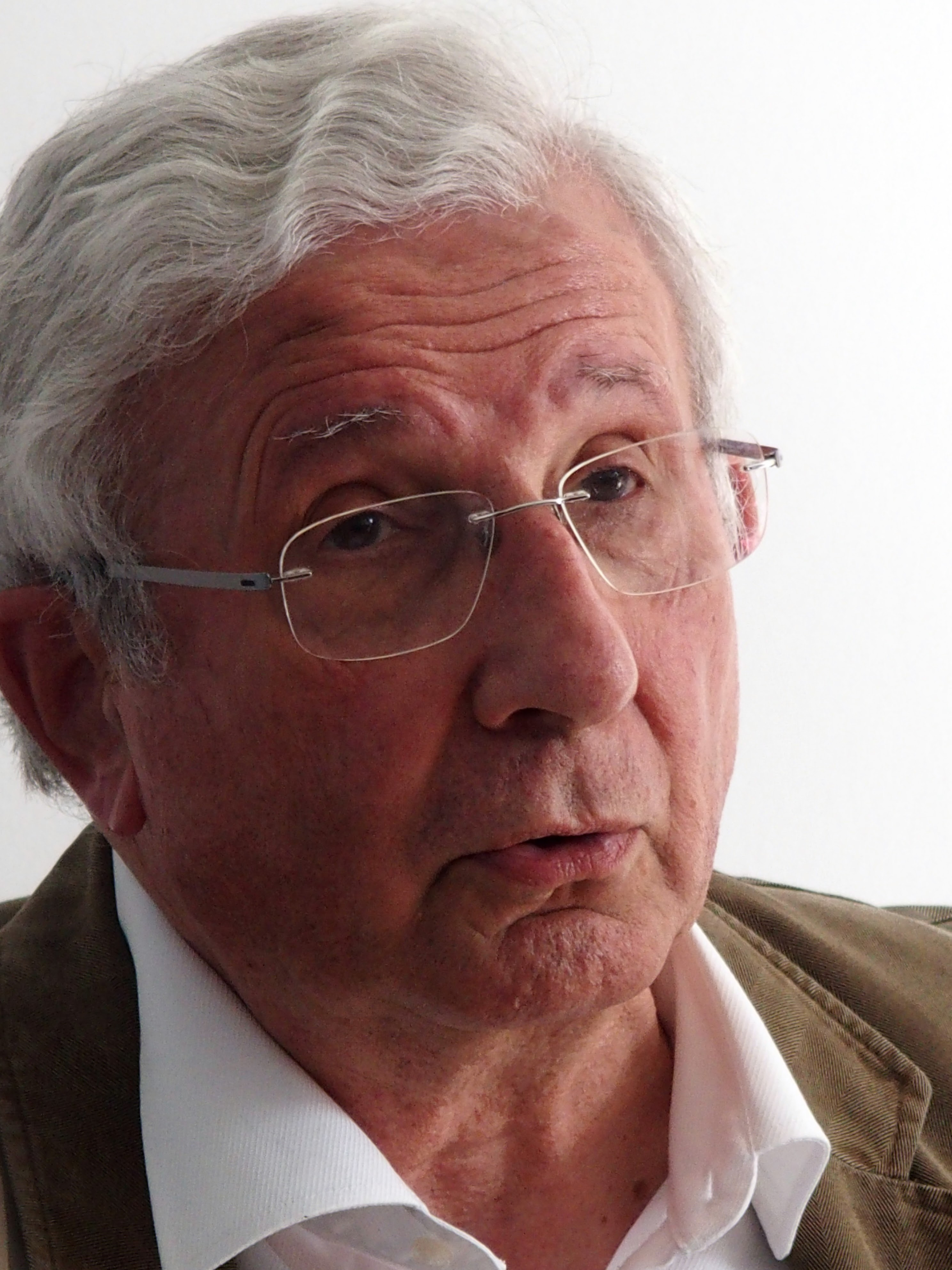
Yann Richard (2017)

Yann Richard, born in 1948 in Joncy (Saône-et-Loire), France, professor emeritus of the Sorbonne nouvelle (Paris) is a specialist of modern Shiʿism, the history of contemporary Iran as well as Persian literature.

== Publications ==
- 1980: Le Shi'isme en Iran. Islam et révolution, Paris, Jean Maisonneuve, 1980, 135p.
- 1982: [Persian edition and transl. into French with introduction]: Nuroddin ‘Abdorrahmân b. Ahmad JÂMI, Les Jaillissements de Lumière. Lavâyeh, Paris, Les Deux Océans, 181 p.
- 1987: [Codirected with Bernard Hourcade]: Téhéran, Au-dessous du volcan, Paris, Autrement, 222 p.
- 1989: [under his direction]: Entre l'Iran et l'Occident: Adaptation et assimilation des idées et techniques occidentales en Iran, éditions de la Maison des Sciences de l'Homme, Paris, 242 p.
- 1990: [Codirected with Gilles Kepel]: Intellectuels et militants de l'Islam contemporain, édition du Seuil, 287 p.
- 1995: Shi'ite Islam : Polity, Ideology, and Creed, Transl. by Antonia Nevill, Oxford - Cambridge, XIII-241 p. (from the French L'Islam chiite : Croyances et idéologies, éditions Fayard, 302 p.)
- 2003: 100 mots pour dire l'Iran moderne, éditions Maisonneuve & Larose, 220 p.
- 2006: L'Iran. Naissance d'une république islamique, éditions de La Martinière, 378 p.
- 2007: [Cowritten with Jean-Pierre Digard and Bernard Hourcade]: L'Iran au XXe siècle : Entre nationalisme, islam et mondialisation, éditions Fayard, 501 p. (3nd edition)
- 2009: L'Iran de 1800 à nos jours, Flammarion, 472 p. (reedition of "L'Iran. Naissance d'une république islamique")
- 2010: [Edition and introduction] C.J. Edmonds, East and West of Zagros. Travel, war and politics in Persia and Iraq, 1913-1921, Leiden - Boston, Brill, XXI-377 p.
- 2015: [Edition and introduction] Regards français sur le coup d’État de 1921 en Perse, Journaux personnels de Georges Ducrocq et Hélène Hoppenot, Leiden - Boston, Brill, VI-699 p.
- 2016: L'Iran de 1800 à nos jours, Flammarion, 492 p. (new edition with corrections and additional chapter)
- 2019 : Iran. A Social and Political History since the Qajars, Cambridge, Cambridge University Press
