= Mohammad Gholi Majd =

Iranian author

- Born: 1946 (age 79–80); Tehran, Imperial State of Iran

Academic background
- Education: Cornell University College of Agriculture and Life Sciences
- Thesis: Policies Concerning Sugar Production in Iran (1978)

Academic work
- Main interests: History of Iran

Mohammad Gholi Majd (Persian: محمد قلی مجد), also known as M.G. Madjd, is an Iranian author whose primary field of work is the modern history of Iran.

Majd obtained a PhD in agricultural economics from Cornell University in 1978, and was a visiting lecturer at the Middle East Center, University of Pennsylvania from 1988 to 1993.

== Bibliography ==
=== Books ===
- Resistance to the Shah: Landowners and the Ulama in Iran. University Press of Florida. 2000.
- Great Britain & Reza Shah: The Plunder of Iran, 1921–1941. University Press of Florida. 2001.
- The Great American Plunder of Persia's Antiquities, 1925–1941. University Press of America. 2003.
- Persia in World War I and Its Conquest by Great Britain. University Press of America. 2003.
- The Great Famine and Genocide in Persia, 1917–1919. University Press of America. 2003.
- Iraq in World War I: From Ottoman Rule to British Conquest. University Press of America. 2006.
- Oil and the Killing of the American Consul in Tehran. University Press of America. 2006.
- From Qajar to Pahlavi: Iran, 1919–1930. University Press of America. 2008.
- August 1941: The Anglo-Russian Occupation of Iran and Change of Shahs. University Press of America. 2012.
- Iran Under Allied Occupation in World War II: The Bridge to Victory & a Land of Famine. University Press of America. 2016.
- A Victorian Holocaust: Iran in the Great Famine of 1869–1873. Hamilton Books. 2017.

=== Other published works ===
- Madjd, Mohammad Gholi (1983). "Land Reform and Agricultural Policy in Iran, 1962–78". Charles H. Dyson School of Applied Economics and Management. doi:10.22004/ag.econ.184108.
- Majd, M. G. (1989). "Land Reform Policies in Iran: Reply". American Journal of Agricultural Economics. 71 (4): 1050–1053. doi:10.2307/1242683. JSTOR 1242683.
- Majd, Mohammad Gholi (2000). "Small Landowners and Land Distribution in Iran, 1962–71". International Journal of Middle East Studies. 32 (1): 123–153. doi:10.1017/S0020743800021073. JSTOR 259538. S2CID 162294229.
- Majd, M. G. (1992). "On the Relationship between Land Reform and Rural-Urban Migration in Iran, 1966–1976". Middle East Journal. 46 (3): 123–153. JSTOR 4328465.
- Majd, Mohammad Gholi (2012). "A Response to Pezhmann Dailami's Review of "From Qajar to Pahlavi: Iran, 1919-1930"". International Journal of Middle East Studies. 44 (1): 209–210. doi:10.1017/S0020743811001565. JSTOR 41475012. S2CID 162968911.
