= USS Ticonderoga (CG-47) =

Ticonderoga-class cruiser

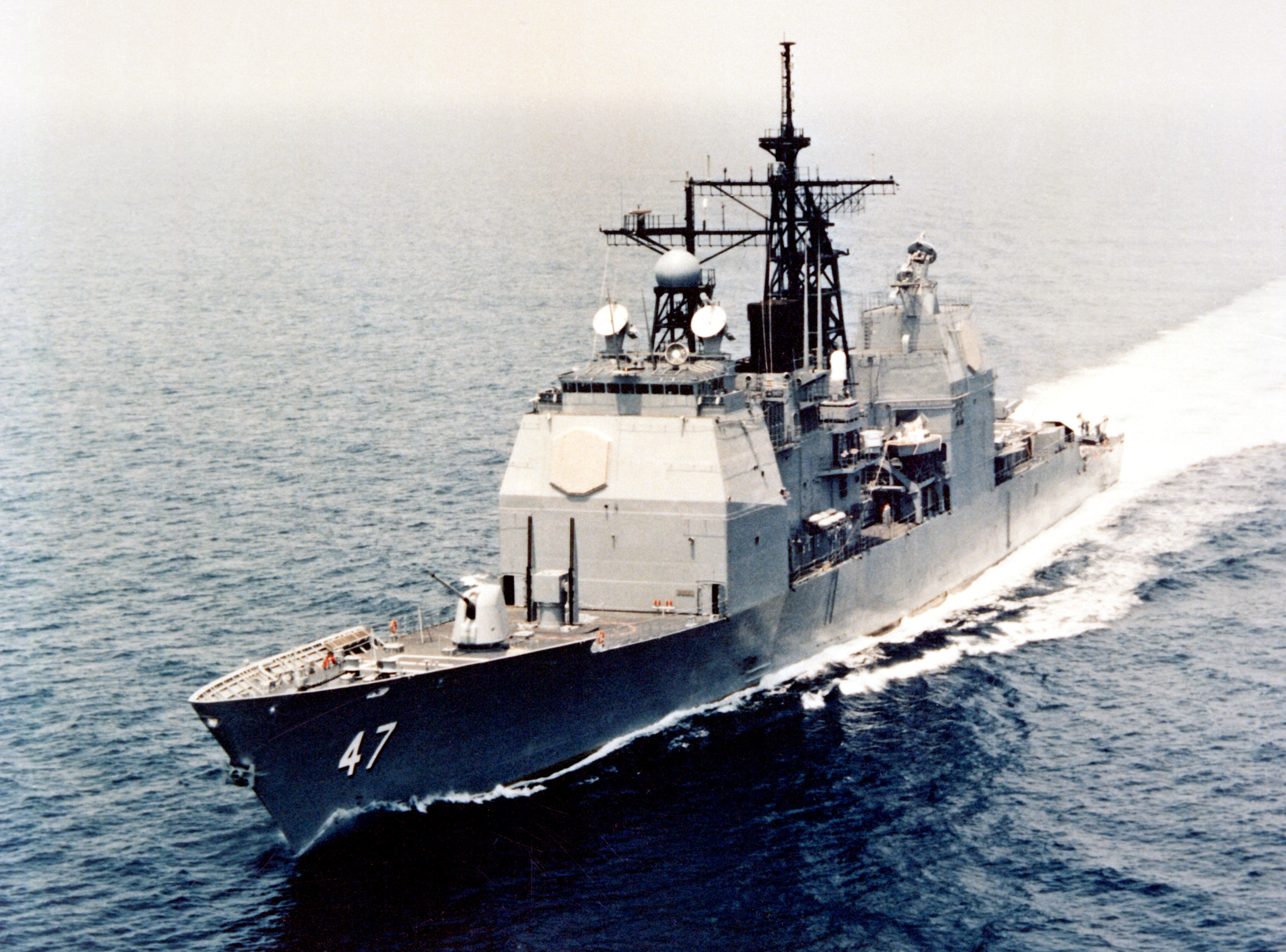
- USS Ticonderoga in May 1982

History

United States
- Name: Ticonderoga
- Namesake: Battle of Ticonderoga
- Ordered: 22 September 1978
- Builder: Ingalls Shipbuilding
- Laid down: 21 January 1980
- Launched: 25 April 1981
- Sponsored by: Nancy Reagan
- Christened: 16 May 1981
- Commissioned: 22 January 1983
- Decommissioned: 30 September 2004
- Stricken: 30 September 2004
- Identification: Call sign: NTIC; Hull number: CG-47
- Motto: First AEGIS Cruiser
- Nickname(s): Tico
- Status: Arrived in Brownsville, Texas for scrapping in September 2020
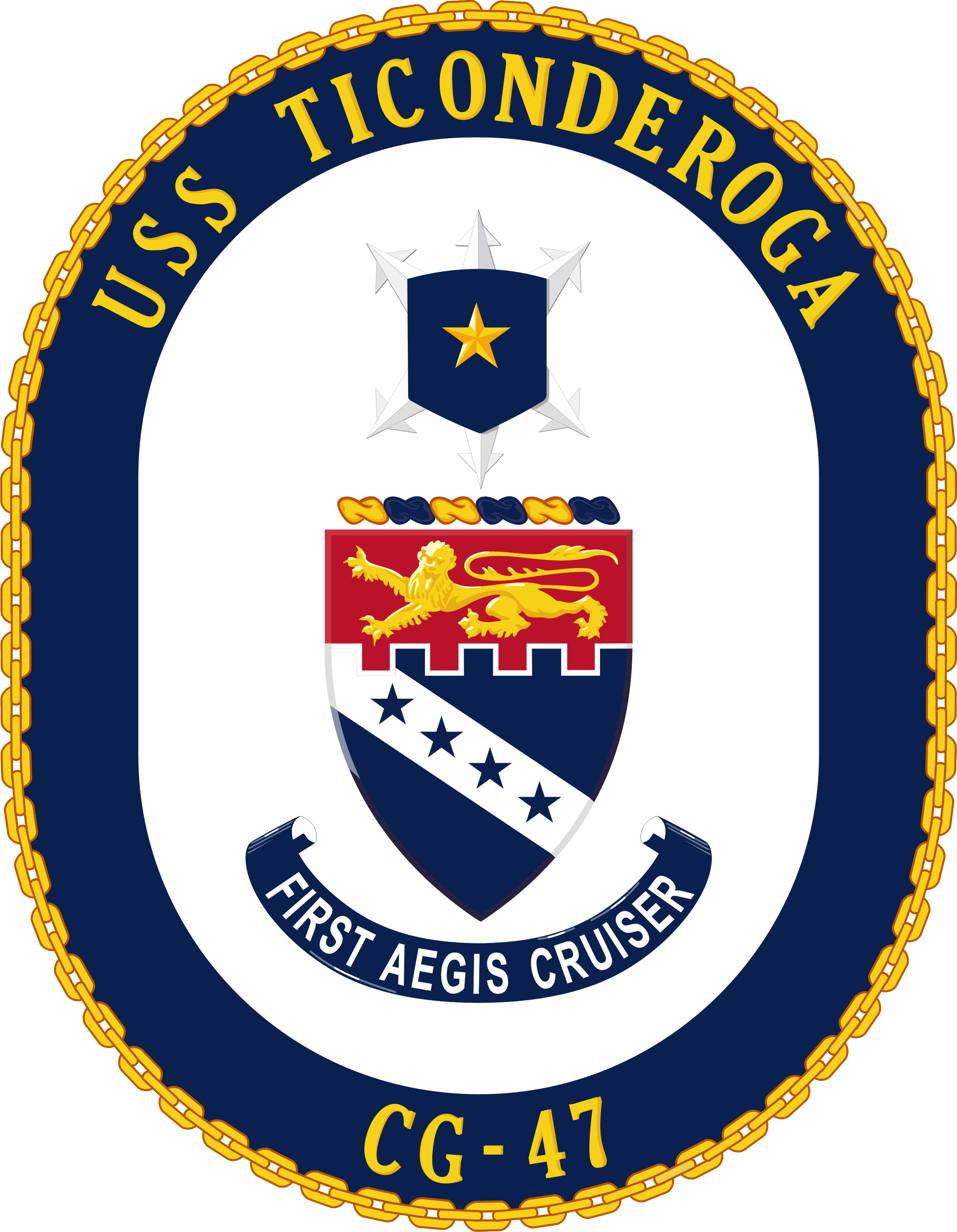
- Badge

General characteristics
- Class & type: Ticonderoga-class cruiser
- Displacement: Approx. 9,600 long tons (9,800 t) full load
- Length: 567 feet (173 m)
- Beam: 55 feet (16.8 meters)
- Draft: 34 feet (10.2 meters)
- Propulsion: 4 × General Electric LM2500 gas turbine engines; 2 × controllable-reversible pitch propellers; 2 × rudders
- Speed: 32.5 knots (60 km/h; 37.4 mph)
- Complement: 30 officers and 300 enlisted
- Sensors & processing systems: AN/SPY-1A/B multi-function radar; AN/SPS-49 air search radar (Removed on some ships); AN/SPG-62 fire control radar; AN/SPS-73 surface search radar; AN/SPQ-9 gun fire control radar; AN/SQQ-89(V)1/3 - A(V)15 Sonar suite, consisting of: AN/SQS-53B/C/D active sonar; AN/SQR-19 TACTAS, AN/SQR-19B ITASS, & MFTA passive sonar; AN/SQQ-28 light airborne multi-purpose system
- Armament: 2 × Mk 26 missile launchers; 68 × RIM-66 SM-2; 20 × RUR-5 ASROC; 8 × RGM-84 Harpoon missiles; 2 × 5 in (127 mm)/54 caliber Mark 45 lightweight gun; 2–4 × .50 in (12.7 mm) cal. machine gun; 2 × Phalanx CIWS; 2 × Mk 32 12.75 in (324 mm) triple torpedo tubes
- Aircraft carried: 2 × MH-60R Seahawk LAMPS Mk III helicopters.

USS Ticonderoga (DDG/CG-47), nicknamed "Tico", was a guided missile cruiser built for the United States Navy. She was the lead ship of the Ticonderoga class and the first U.S. Navy combatant to incorporate the Aegis combat system. Originally ordered as a guided-missile destroyer, she was redesignated as a cruiser after capabilities from the cancelled Strike cruiser program were implemented into the ship's design. The new AEGIS system allowed Ticonderoga to track and engage many aerial targets more effectively than any previous U.S. Navy warship.

Ticonderoga entered service in 1983 and deployed later that year to the Mediterranean. Over her first 10 years of service, Ticonderoga deployed multiple times to the Mediterranean, Atlantic, and Indian Oceans and the Persian Gulf. During Operation Desert Storm, she was attached to Battle Force Zulu and served as Arabian Gulf Track Coordinator. Although she was built with a 35-year service life, the limited missile capacity of Ticonderoga's twin Mark 26 missile launch systems rendered her obsolete by the end of the Cold War. As a result, Ticonderoga adopted a primary mission of counternarcotics in the 1990s and 2000s, and made multiple patrols of the Caribbean in that role.

After being decommissioned in 2004, Ticonderoga was stored at the Naval Inactive Ship Maintenance Facility in Philadelphia. She arrived in Brownsville, Texas, for scrapping in 2020.

== Design and construction ==
The contract to build DDG-47 Ticonderoga was awarded to Ingalls Shipbuilding on 22 September 1978. The ship's design was based on that of the Spruance-class destroyer. While sharing the same hull, the Ticonderoga-class design featured two large deckhouses and the Aegis combat system that together increased the ship's displacement from the Spruance-class baseline of 6,900 tons to 9,600 tons. On each of the two deckhouses were two AN/SPY-1 radars that gave the ship 360° coverage of the surrounding airspace. Following the cancellation of the Strike Cruiser program, flagship capabilities were added to the Ticonderoga class's design and the ship was then redesignated as a guided-missile cruiser, CG-47 on 1 January 1980, shortly before her keel was laid.

Ticonderoga's keel was laid down on 21 January 1980, the 35th anniversary of the devastating kamikaze attack on the Essex-class aircraft carrier Ticonderoga (CV-14). CG-47 was launched on 25 April 1981 and christening on 16 May 1981 with First Lady Nancy Reagan, the ship's main sponsor, in attendance. Ticonderoga was delivered to the U.S. Navy on 13 December 1982 and commissioned in Pascagoula, Mississippi, on 22 January 1983 with Captain Roland Guilbault in command.

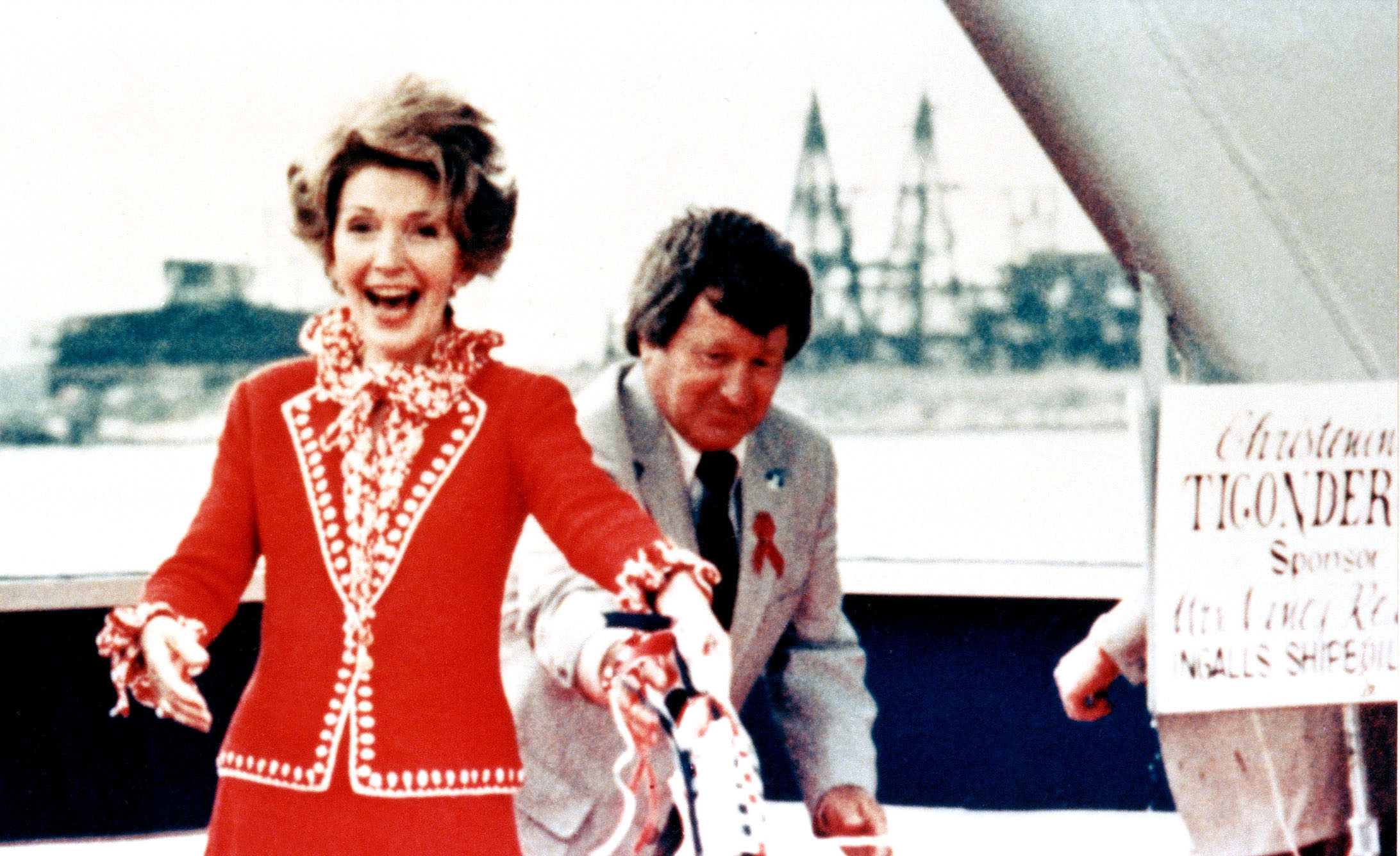
U.S. First Lady Nancy Reagan christened USS Ticonderoga on 16 May 1981.

=== Naming ===
CG-47 is the fifth United States Navy vessel to bear the name Ticonderoga. She was named for the Capture of Fort Ticonderoga in 1775, the start of the American offensive during the American Revolution. The name "Ticonderoga" is derived from the Iroquois word tekontaró:ken, meaning "it is at the junction of two waterways". Most of the ships in the Ticonderoga class are similarly named for significant battles in U.S. history.

== Service history ==
=== 1980s ===
Departing for her new homeport of Naval Station Norfolk, Virginia, soon after her commissioning in Pascagoula, Ticonderoga completed exercises in the Caribbean Sea and Atlantic Ocean. She arrived in Norfolk on 3 June 1983, and then deployed on 20 October to the Mediterranean with the Independence carrier strike group. Although stopping in Portsmouth, England, for a brief port visit, Ticonderoga was dispatched to the coast of Beirut following the bombing of U.S. Marine barracks on 23 October 1983. During her 48 days on station, she fired her five-inch guns at hostile artillery units attempting to shoot down two F-14 Tomcat fighter aircraft performing a reconnaissance mission over Lebanon. Ticonderoga made a port stop in Haifa, Israel, for the New Year and then returned to Norfolk, arriving on 4 May 1984.

On 8 September 1984, while Ticonderoga was conducting exercises east of Mayport, Florida, a fire broke out in her aft main engine exhaust uptake. The At-Sea and General Quarters fire parties eventually put the fire out and Ticonderoga returned to Norfolk under her own power in early October.

On 23 March 1986, Ticonderoga, while conducting a Freedom of Navigation exercise in the Gulf of Sidra, moved south of the "Line of Death" in Libya, covered by fighter aircraft. Libya responded by unsuccessfully attacking battle-force aircraft. Ticonderoga responded by destroying several Libyan patrol boats. For her participation in the operation, Ticonderoga received her second Navy Unit Commendation and Navy Expeditionary Medal. During joint Navy-Air Force air strikes on Libyan targets on 15 April, she received the Armed Forces Expeditionary Medal.

In the late 1980s, she served in the Persian Gulf as part of Operation Earnest Will while under the command of Captain James M. Arrison III, USN.

=== 1990s ===
For a time in the late 1990s, she was based at Pascagoula, Mississippi, as part of Commander, Naval Surface Force Atlantic's Western Hemisphere Group.

=== 2000s ===
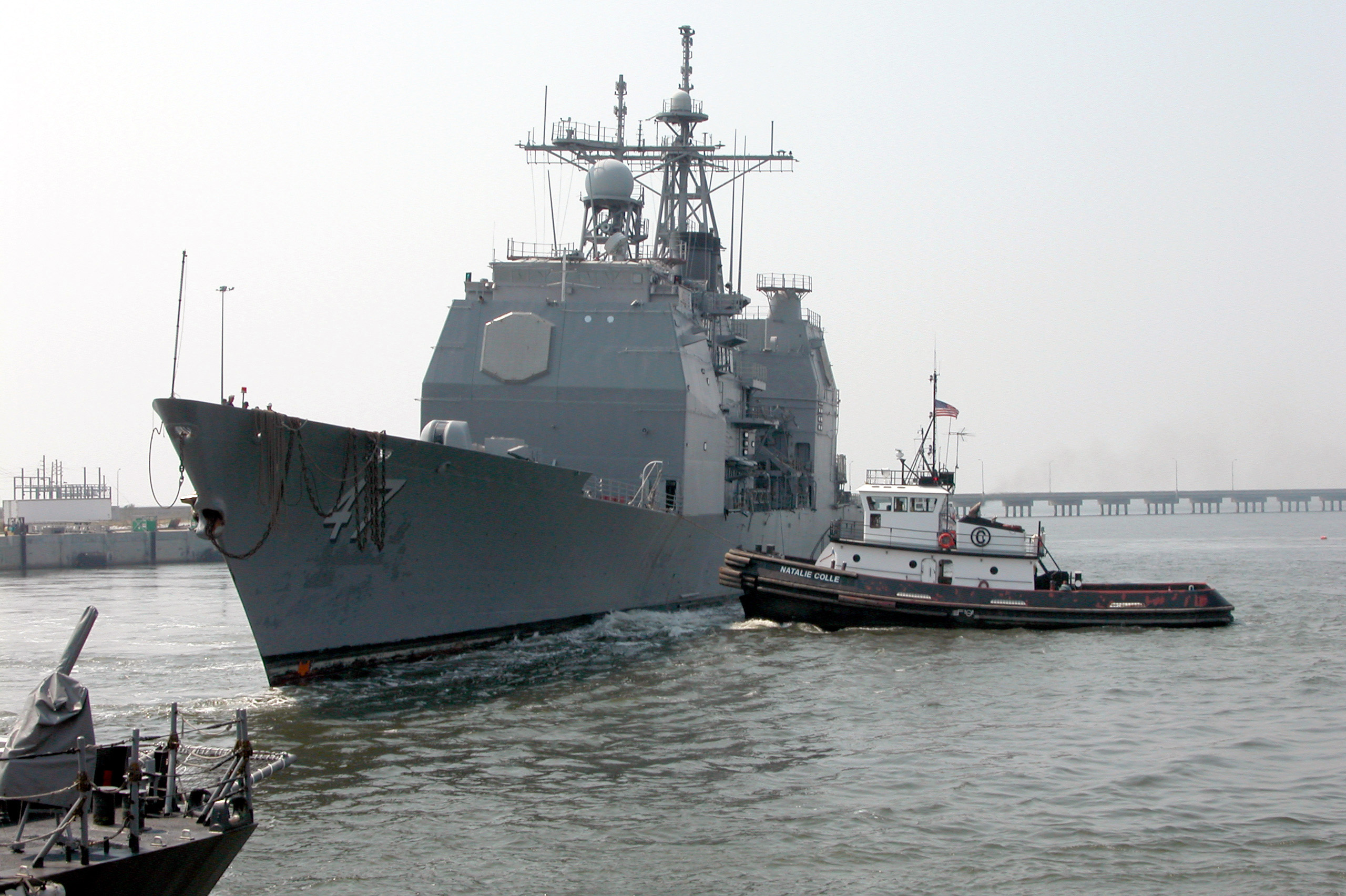
Ticonderoga was towed from Naval Station Pascagoula immediately following her decommissioning on 30 September 2004.

On 4 May 2004, she completed transit of the Panama Canal and then moved to cross the equator. Her ship crew engaged in the rites and rituals of the crossing, inducting the captain of the ship and many of the crew in to "Shell-Backs". She completed her final deployment on 3 August 2004. Ticonderoga then made liberty port visits to Cozumel, Mexico (15-17 March); Colon (27-28 March); Mayport (1-9 April); Guantánamo Bay (12-13 April); Cartagena, Colombia (27-29 May); Vasco Núñez de Balboa, Panama (6-7 May); and Puerto Quetzal, Guatemala (17-19 May). She conducted counter-narcotics operations in conjunction with Colombian military authorities from April–June. Ticonderoga successfully intercepted five cigarette-shaped "go-fast" smuggling boats, and one fishing vessel, netting over 14,000 pounds of cocaine, and detaining 25 suspects in the process. She was decommissioned on 30 September of that year. After her decommissioning, she was towed to the Naval Inactive Ship Maintenance Facility in Philadelphia. In 2010, she was offered for museum donation by the Navy. An effort was made to bring Ticonderoga to Pascagoula, Mississippi, where she was built, to serve as a museum ship. In May 2013, the vessel was formally stricken from the Naval Vessel Register, for disposal. In October of the same year, The Ticonderoga Historical Society reported that the US Navy was going to scrap the ship after a number of potential museum sites were unable to add her to their collections. In June 2014, NAVSEA released a disposal reporting letter declaring the ex-Ticonderoga to be available for inspection by bidders and ready for disposal by scrapping or sinking. In September 2020, she arrived at Brownsville, Texas, for scrapping.

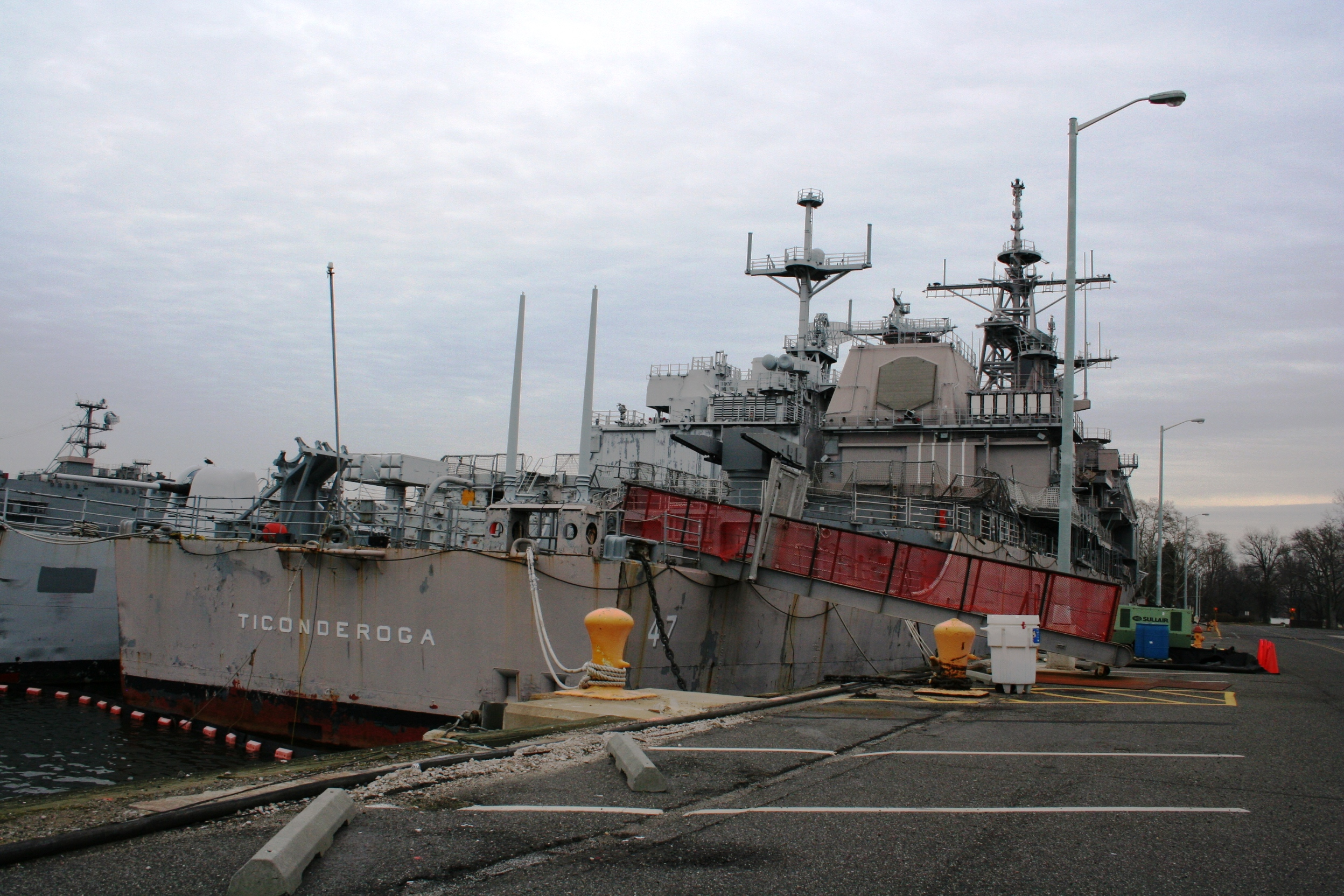
The former USS Ticonderoga was at berth at the Philadelphia Naval Inactive Ship Maintenance Facility in January 2008.

== Deployments ==
Start	End	Areas of Operation	Notes
20 October 1983	4 May 1984	North Atlantic,	
20 April 2001	28 August 2001	Caribbean, Eastern Pacific	
10 March 2004	4 August 2004	Caribbean	

== Awards ==
- 1x Joint Meritorious Unit Award – (1997)
- 6x Navy Unit Commendations – (May 1982-May 1984, Mar-Apr 1986, Aug 1987-Apr 1988, Sep 1987-Mar 1989 BATTLESHIP BATTLE GROUP 1-87, Mar-Sep 1990, Sep 1991-Apr 1992)
- 5x Meritorious Unit Commendations (3 to the ship, two as part of the USS Dwight D. Eisenhower (CVN-69) Battle Group, 1990-1992)
- 3x Battle Efficiency (Navy E) Ribbons – (1994, 1998, 2001)
- 1x Navy Expeditionary Medal – (Mar-Jun 1986)
- 2x National Defense Service Medal
- 4x Armed Forces Expeditionary Medals
- 1x Southwest Asia Service Medal – (Oct 1991-Feb 1992)
- 2x Armed Forces Service Medals
- 2x Coast Guard Special Operations Service Ribbons
- (multiple) Sea Service Deployment Ribbon
- 2x Secretary of the Navy Letters of Commendation (one to the ship, one as part of Battleship Battle Group 1-87, 1987-1988)
- 1x Chief of Naval Operations Letter of Commendation
- Arleigh Burke Fleet Trophy – (2003)

== In popular culture ==
Ticonderoga was featured in the 1986 Tom Clancy novel Red Storm Rising, defending the USS Nimitz and USS Saratoga combined battlegroups against, and getting seriously damaged by, the saturation antiship missile attack in the Norwegian Sea by Soviet Tu-22M bombers.

Ticonderoga was mentioned in the Tom Waits song "Shore Leave" on his 1983 album Swordfishtrombones.
