= Trump-class battleship =

Proposed American battleship class

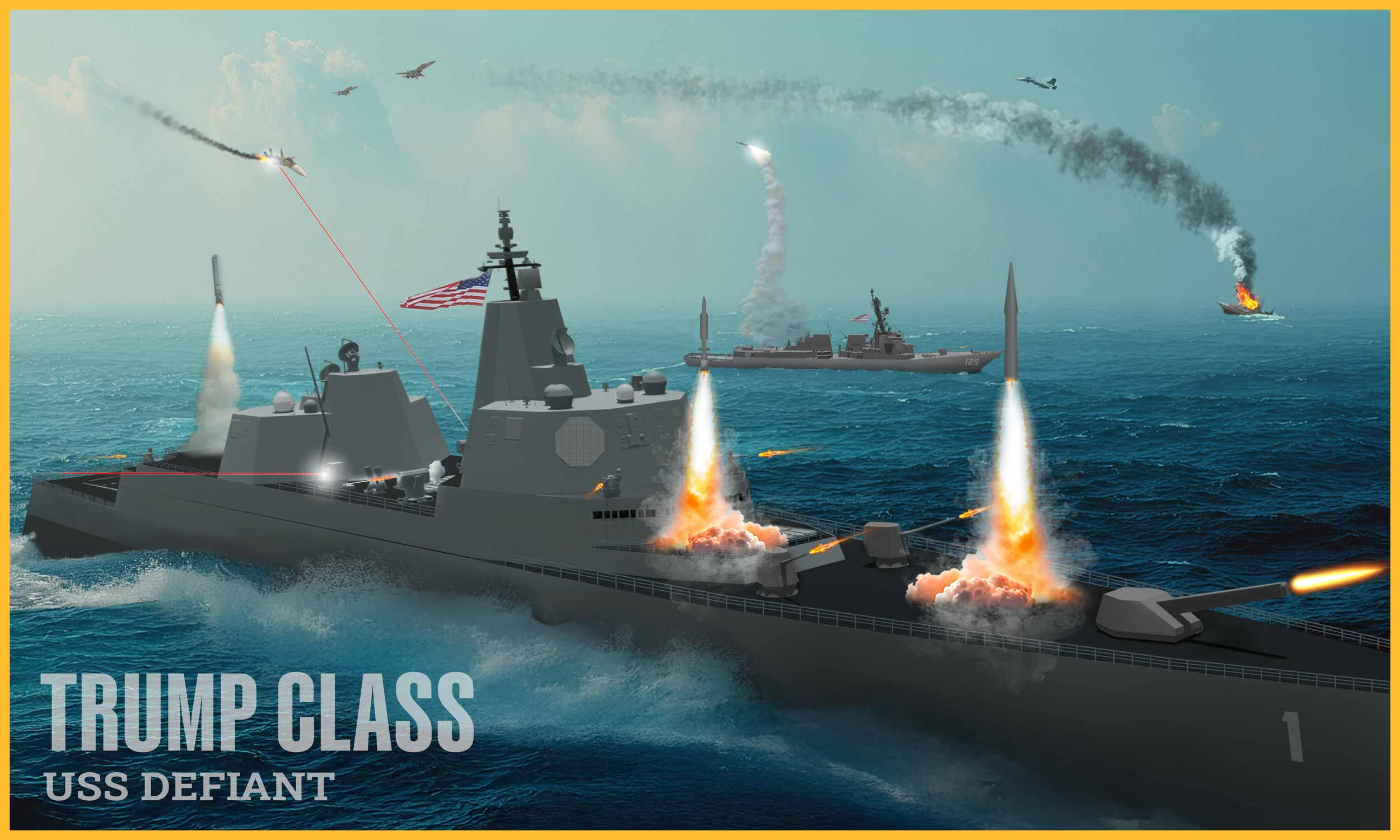
- A graphic of the planned ship released by the U.S. Navy

Class overview
- Name: BBG(X)
- Operators: United States Navy (projected)
- Preceded by: DDG(X) (planned); Iowa class (as battleship)
- Cost: First ship: estimated US$23 billion (FY2026); Subsequent ships: estimated US$18 billion (FY2026)
- Built: 2030s (planned)
- Planned: 2; 10; 20–25

General characteristics
- Type: Guided-missile battleship
- Displacement: >34,000 long tons (35,000 t)
- Length: 840–880 ft (260–270 m)
- Beam: 105–115 ft (32–35 m)
- Draft: 24–30 ft (7.3–9.1 m)
- Propulsion: A1B reactor
- Speed: >30 kn (56 km/h; 35 mph)
- Crew: 650–800
- Sensors & processing systems: AN/SPY-6 air-search radar
- Armament: Missiles: Surface Launch Cruise Missile Nuclear (SLCM-N) (potentially); 12 cells Conventional Prompt Strike (CPS); 128-200 cells Mk 41 Vertical launching system (VLS); 2 × RIM-116 Rolling Airframe Missile missile-based CIWS launchers; Guns: 1 × 32 MJ railgun (potentially); 2 × Mk45 5"/62-caliber (127 mm); 4 × Mk38 30 mm (1.18 in); Others: Directed-energy weapon (potentially)
- Aircraft carried: Capable of fielding V-22 Ospreys and Future Vertical Lift helicopters
- Aviation facilities: Flight deck with two hangars
- Notes: Data from the United States Naval Institute unless otherwise noted

The Trump-class battleship is a proposed nuclear-powered guided-missile warship for the United States Navy, announced by U.S. president Donald Trump in December 2025. The class is also known as BBG(X) (Note: BB means battleship, G means guided missile ship (i.e., a ship with a medium- or long-range air defense system), and (X) means the design of the ship has not yet been fully developed.) or BBGN in Navy documents, and is intended to initially consist of the lead ship USS Defiant (BBG-1) and an as-yet unnamed other vessel. The class is envisioned as adding a nuclear-capable cruise missile option to the U.S. Navy surface fleet, along with the non-nuclear Conventional Prompt Strike hypersonic attack missile, as offensive weapons.

The Trump administration has stated its intention to revitalize shipbuilding in the United States alongside the construction of the Trump class. Analysts have expressed skepticism about the Trump class, citing its lack of funding, unprecedented design, and high development costs. Its classification as a battleship is debated, as it lacks the heavy armor and large-caliber naval guns typical of historical battleships. The naming of the class after a living person and an incumbent president also broke convention.

== History ==
=== Background ===
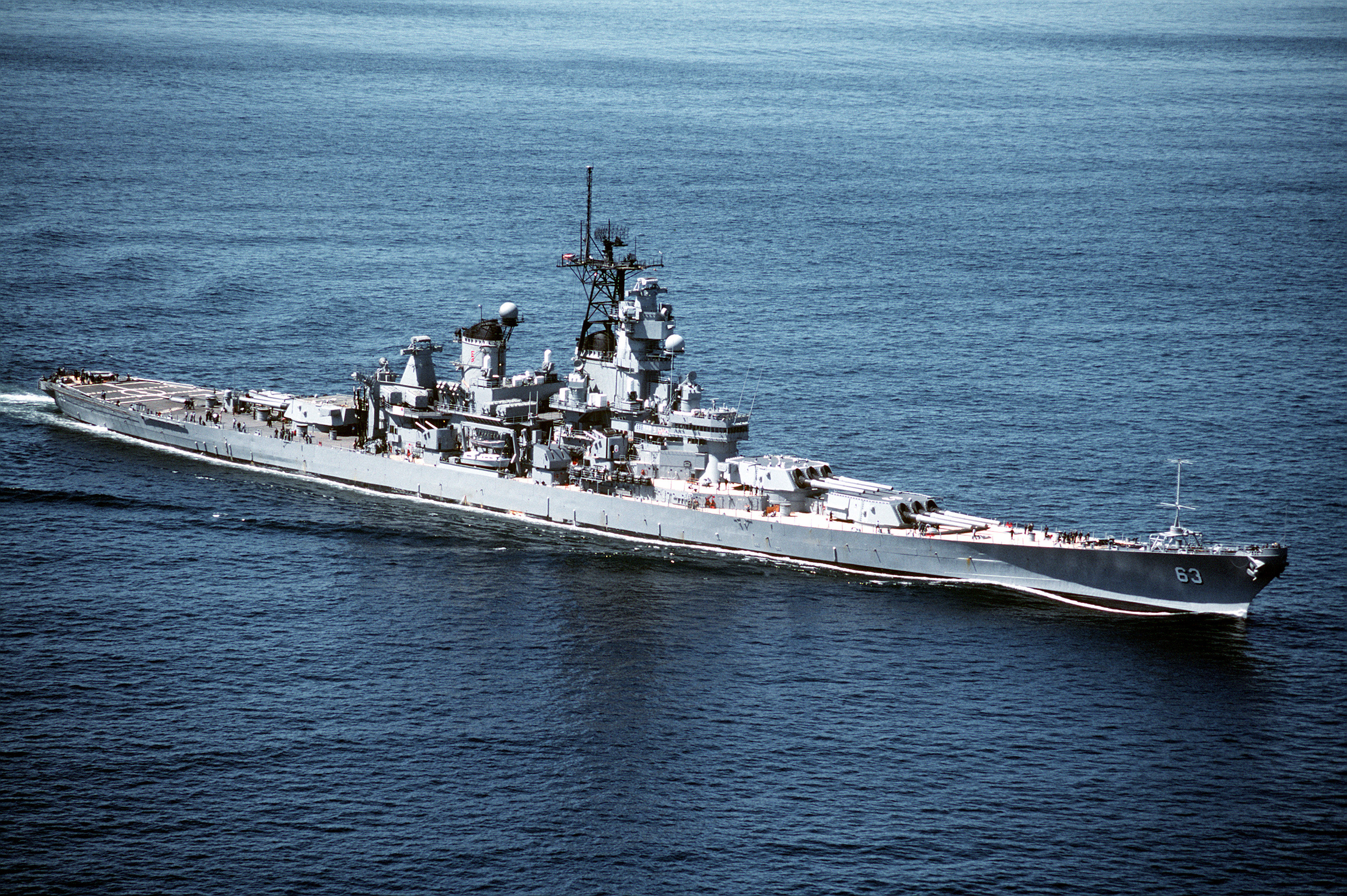
USS Missouri in 1991 after returning from the Gulf War. The Iowa-class battleships were constructed during World War II and were the last ships operated by the U.S. Navy to be classified as battleships.

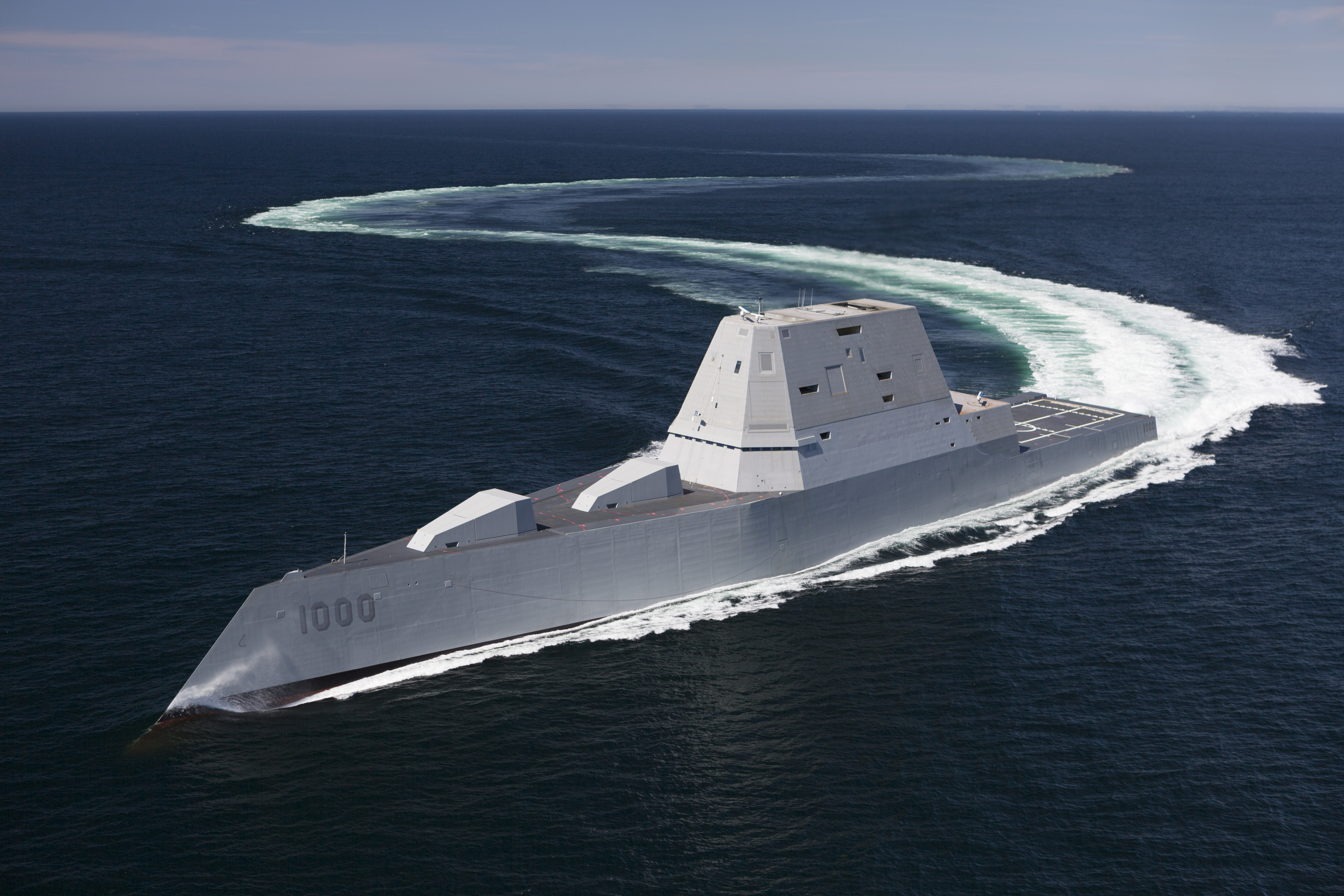
USS Zumwalt in 2016. The Zumwalt-class destroyers are the largest surface combatants currently operated by the U.S. Navy and were designed in part to replace gunfire support and other capabilities of the Iowa class.

The U.S. Navy has not had a battleship in commission since the retirement of the last Iowa-class battleship USS Missouri in 1992. There have been no plans for new ones since the cancellation of the Montana class in 1943.

The retirement of the Iowa-class led to a battleship retirement debate on how the Navy should replace their capabilities. The Zumwalt-class destroyer was developed to replace their naval gunfire support function, but the class was canceled after only three ships were constructed. The Navy also launched studies into a Future Surface Combatant (FSC) to replace the Ticonderoga-class cruisers—which will reach the end of their service lives in the 2020s—as well as older flights of the Arleigh Burke-class destroyer. The FSC evolved into the Large Surface Combatant (LSC) program, which became the DDG(X). The DDG(X) program office was established in June 2021.

Rear Admiral Derek Trinque revealed in January 2026 that the DDG(X) hull was too small for the desired number of VLS for Conventional Prompt Strike (CPS) missiles plus a gun mount. The U.S. Navy considered building two DDG(X) variants. However, it pivoted to a larger vessel capable of accommodating both after the Trump administration showed interest in a modern battleship, which became the Trump class. Vice Admiral Brendan McLane, commander of Naval Surface Force, said in February 2026 that the Flight III Arleigh Burke class could no longer accommodate new systems.

=== Development ===
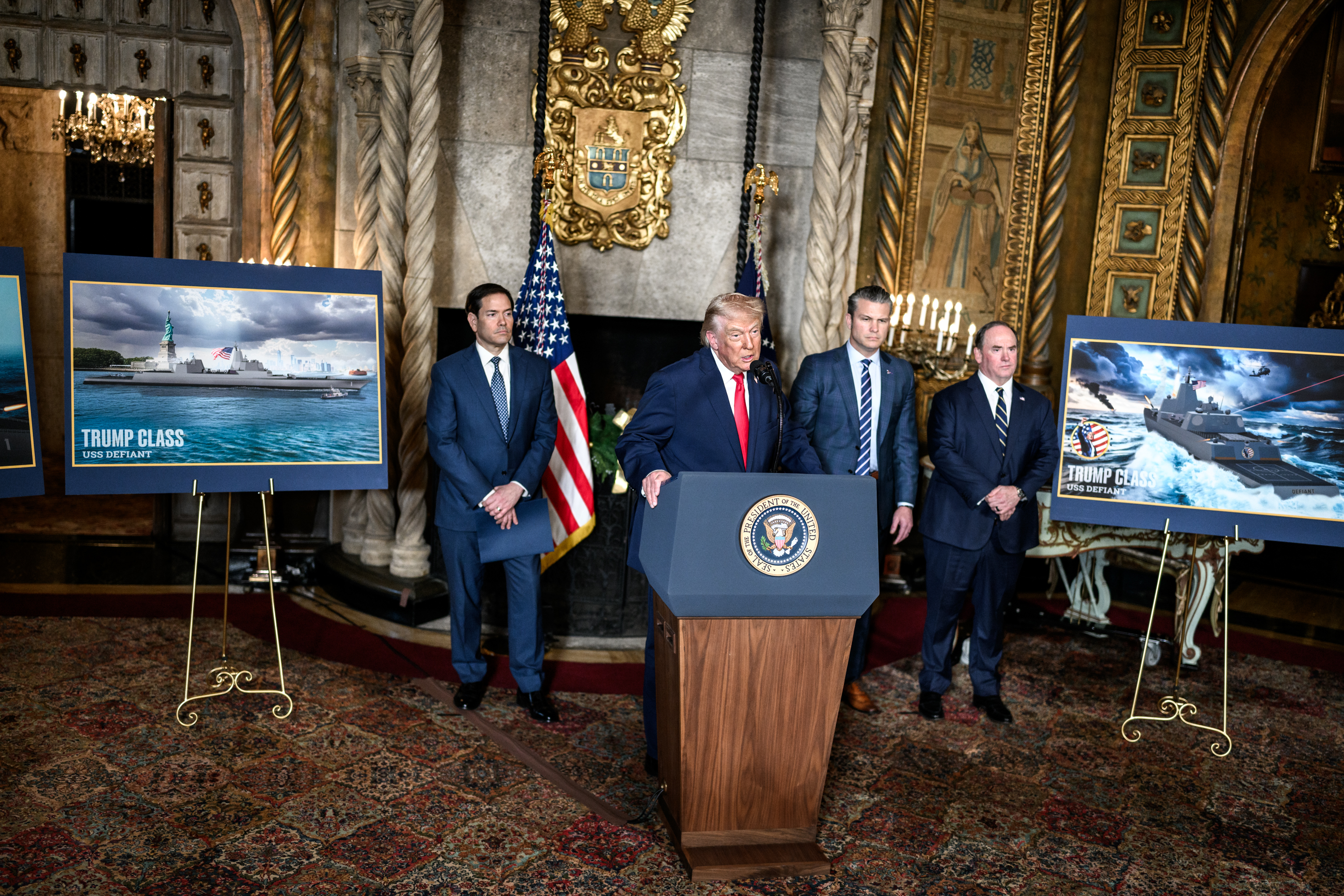
Donald Trump announces plans for a "Golden Fleet" in December 2025

On 22 December 2025, U.S. president Donald Trump announced the Trump class, with two ships to be initially constructed of 10 planned, and eventual plans for "between 20 and 25" as part of a "Golden Fleet". The first ship is planned to be named USS Defiant (BBG‑1). John C. Phelan, then-U.S. Secretary of the Navy, said the ships would carry conventional guns and nuclear-armed cruise missiles. Trump said the ships would be built at the Hanwha Philly Shipyard in Philadelphia, Pennsylvania, which is owned by South Korean conglomerate Hanwha Group.

The announcement of the class came amid warnings by U.S. officials that Chinese shipbuilding has surpassed the United States in capacity and output, and is part of the second Trump administration's goal to enlarge the U.S. Navy and revitalize the U.S. shipbuilding industry.

Department of Defense officials said the BBG(X) program will incorporate technology from the DDG(X) program and replace it.

Phelan helped conceive the class to gain favor with President Trump but was ousted in April 2026. The administration did not state a reason for Phelan's removal. Politico and The New York Times reported that anonymous DoD officials said that Secretary of Defense Pete Hegseth and Deputy Secretary of Defense Steve Feinberg had grown frustrated with his advocacy of the expensive battleships, which they felt was impeding construction of the smaller and cheaper warships they prioritized, such as uncrewed surface vessels. His ouster was thought to represent a setback for the class. The Times reported that Phelan "struggled to come up with a plan to deliver the [battleships] on the nearly impossible timeline that Mr. Trump had demanded", and told Trump that to attain the 2028 delivery schedule, the ships might need to be built in European shipyards, which Trump would not accept.

The ships will be nuclear-powered. On 11 May 2026, Acting Secretary of the Navy Hung Cao said three of the battleships, designated BBGNs to reflect their nuclear power, would be built in fiscal 2027 to 2031. (Note: BB means battleship, G means guided missile ship (i.e., a ship with a medium- or long-range air defense system), and N means nuclear-powered.)

In May 2026, construction of the first Trump-class battleship was expected to begin in 2028 for delivery in 2036.

On 4 June 2026, the House Armed Services Committee voted to require the Secretary of the Navy to submit a report by March 2027 detailing acquisition plans for the Trump class, and for mitigation of impacts on Gerald R. Ford-class aircraft carrier construction, as part of their FY2027 defense budget bill. The minority members on the Committee unsuccessfully tried to insert language cutting advance procurement funding for the battleships by $1 billion.

On 5 August 2026, the Congressional Budget Office (CBO) estimated that the construction of 15 Trump-class battleships would cost $275 billion, with the lead ship USS Defiant costing $23.4 billion and the following ships averaging $18 billion.

In November 2026, following the 2026 United States elections in which Democrats took control of Congress, The War Zone published an article casting doubt on the future of the Trump-class battleship. Representatives Adam Smith and Joe Courtney, both critics of the battleship proposal, could lead key defense committees. Smith favors a balanced force of advanced, survivable systems and affordable platforms over costly nuclear battleships, and a new Democratic majority could cut funding or stall the program. Even if the Trump name is dropped, some technologies, such as the electromagnetic railgun, could support other Navy programs, and the Navy could pursue the ship's capabilities through a different design. Heritage Foundation analyst Brent Sadler argues those capabilities are still needed. A report by the Congressional Budget Office, published on November 19, estimated that acquiring 15 vessels of the class could cost around $275 billion, significantly higher than the Navy's projection of $157 billion. This estimate put the cost per battleship at approximately $18.3 billion, against the $10 billion that was initially proposed.

=== Planned armament ===
Navy officials have said ships of the class are to include a main battery of a Surface Launch Cruise Missile-Nuclear (SLCM-N) system, a 12-cell Conventional Prompt Strike (CPS) hypersonic missile system, and a 128-cell Mark 41 vertical launching system (VLS). A secondary battery is to consist of a 32-megajoule railgun, two 5-inch/62-caliber (127 mm) guns, and a pair of 300 or 600-kilowatt laser weapons. A defensive battery is planned with two RAM launchers, four Mark 38 30 mm machine gun systems, four ODIN lasers, and two anti-drone systems. The ship is to have an enclosed hangar for VTOL aircraft such as helicopters, the V-22 Osprey, and future vertical-lift manned and unmanned aircraft. The lasers, nuclear cruise missiles, and the railgun could be added to the base design.

General Atomics said in January 2026 that it was talking with the Navy about the "role of railguns".

Directed-energy weapons such as megawatt-class lasers could be installed as defensive weapons; some current U.S. warships have a 60-kilowatt High Energy Laser with Integrated Optical-dazzler and Surveillance (HELIOS) or less-powerful ODIN.

On 14 May 2026, Acting Navy Secretary Hung Cao said during a House Armed Services Committee hearing that the ship is to have 200 VLS cells.

== Reactions ==
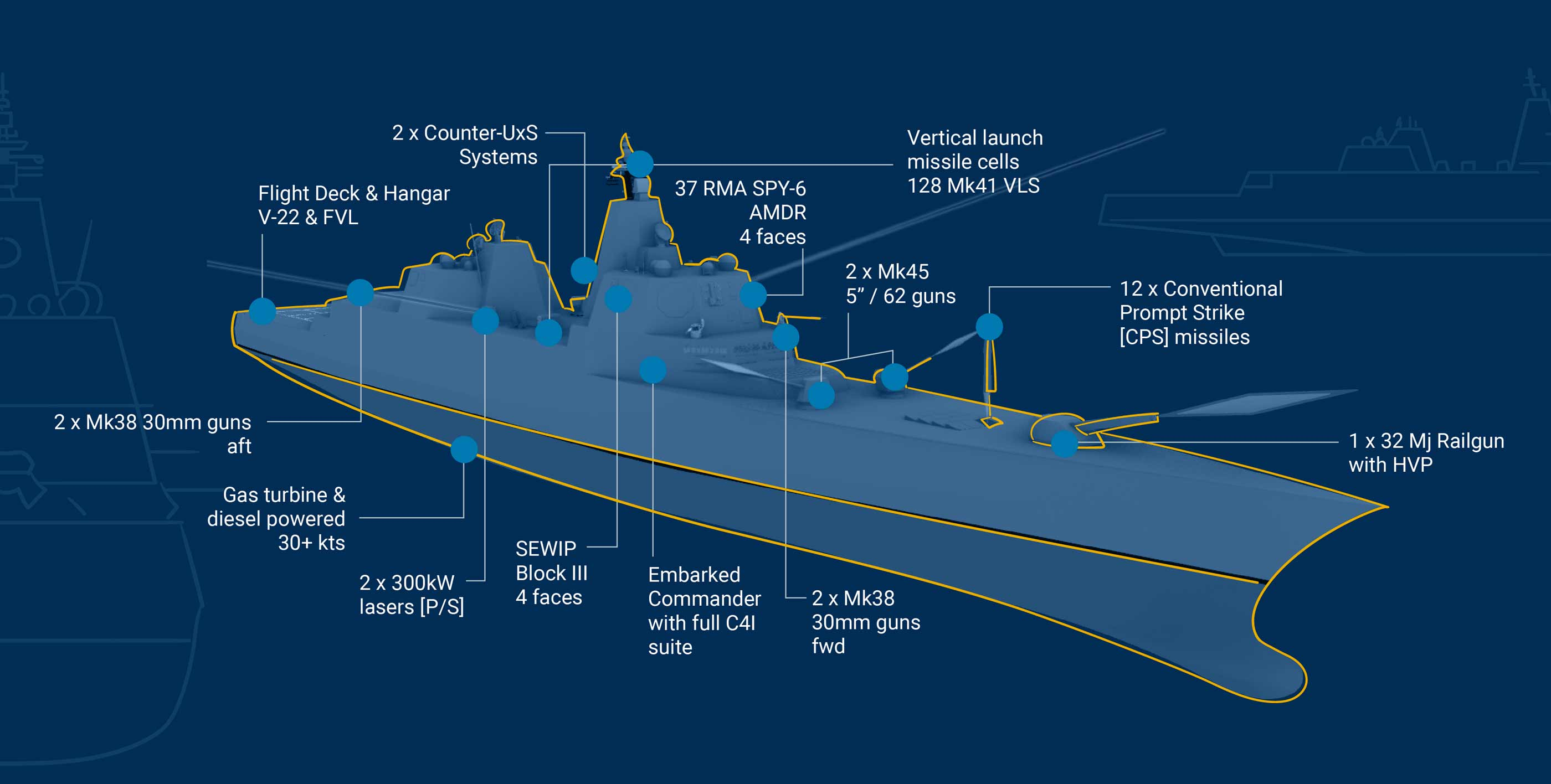
Graphic representation of the weaponry that a Trump-class ship would carry

=== Design ===
Analysts have expressed doubts that the ships will enter service because they have not been funded and their unique and unprecedented design will make development costly and slow.

The classification of the Trump-class ship as a battleship has been questioned. Mark Cancian with the Center for Strategic and International Studies (CSIS) wrote that the term has historically been used for warships with large guns, such as 16-inch guns, and heavy armor, which the Trump class would lack, and that the ship's profile is more typical of a guided-missile "battlecruiser" like Russia's Kirov class.

According to the U.S. Naval Institute, the definition of the term "battleship" has evolved over time, from wooden ships with many guns (line-of-battleship), through to the 20th-century usage of high-caliber gunned ships with heavy armor. The ship is meant to survive in a fleet battle, and thus armor is not definitional to the core of the battleship. The importance of the large gun debate depends upon whether the gun is the most important component of the ship's firepower. There was no effective change to ideas about the battleship after the Second World War until the advent of the guided missile.

CNN analyst Stephen Collinson has stated that the procurement of the Trump class would likely revive the battleship retirement debate. Cancian has written that the ship "will never sail" as its high cost will prompt a "future administration [to] cancel the program before the first ship hits the water".

=== U.S. labor force ===
Some have questioned whether the United States has an adequate labor force to build the ships in American shipyards. This argument notes that during World War II, tens of thousands of men and women worked in shifts around the clock at each of the U.S. naval yards that produced the Iowa class. More than 71,000 people were employed at the Brooklyn Navy Yard alone. Cancian notes that U.S. shipbuilders were so short of skilled labor in 2025 that they had been increasing wages to attract workers from competing yards.

In January 2026, the Congressional Research Service stated that the U.S. Navy intends to award contracts to multiple shipbuilders for the construction of a Trump-class battleship. The report identified three capable shipyards: Bath Iron Works and Ingalls Shipbuilding, which have built every U.S. Navy cruiser and destroyer since 1985; and Newport News Shipbuilding, which has specialized in the construction and overhauling of nuclear-powered aircraft carriers.

Trump had previously indicated that the ships would be built at Hanwha Philly Shipyard. As of January 2026, the yard has only ever built commercial vessels and lacks any experience with defense-related contracts. After Hanwha acquired the financially struggling shipyard in 2024, in August 2025 it pledged an investment toward a $5 billion infrastructure plan, with a goal of eventually building warships. However, in May 2026, top Navy officials announced that they would most likely build the battleships at the Newport News shipyard, due to the battleships' nuclear propulsion; the House Armed Services Committee wrote legislation that suggested Dry Dock 12.

=== Name ===
The Trump-class name would not follow United States ship naming conventions. American battleships have been named after U.S. states, with the exception of USS Kearsarge, a pre-dreadnought battleship ordered in 1895; while names of presidents have been used for aircraft carriers before.

Naming a warship after a living person, once rare, is no longer unusual in the United States. However, it is atypical for presidents to name things after themselves. The naming came in the context of the contemporaneous addition of Trump's name to the Kennedy Center and the U.S. Institute of Peace, as well as the new Trump account and Trump Gold Card.

== See also ==
- Arsenal ship, post–Cold War missile-truck large warship concept
- CG(X), canceled post–Cold War U.S. guided-missile cruiser project
- DDG(X), current post–Cold War U.S. guided-missile destroyer project
- K-1000 battleship, early–Cold War speculated Soviet missile battleship design
- Kirov-class battlecruiser, late–Cold War Soviet heavy-missile battlecruiser
- Aegis system equipped vessels (ASEV), Japanese large surface combatant under construction
- Strike cruiser, late–Cold War U.S. missile cruiser design
- USS Kentucky (BBG-1), Iowa-class battleship considered for conversion to guided missile battleship while under construction in the 1950s; never completed
