= CSGN =

CSGN can mean:

- Cyber Sports Gaming Network; An online gaming community/network for semi professional gamers.
- The stock ticker symbol for Credit Suisse on the SWX Swiss Stock Exchange
- Cruiser Strike Guided-missile Nuclear – the US Navy's strike cruiser proposal
- Sign function for real and complex expressions
