= USS Vicksburg (CG-69) =

US Navy Ticonderoga-class cruiser

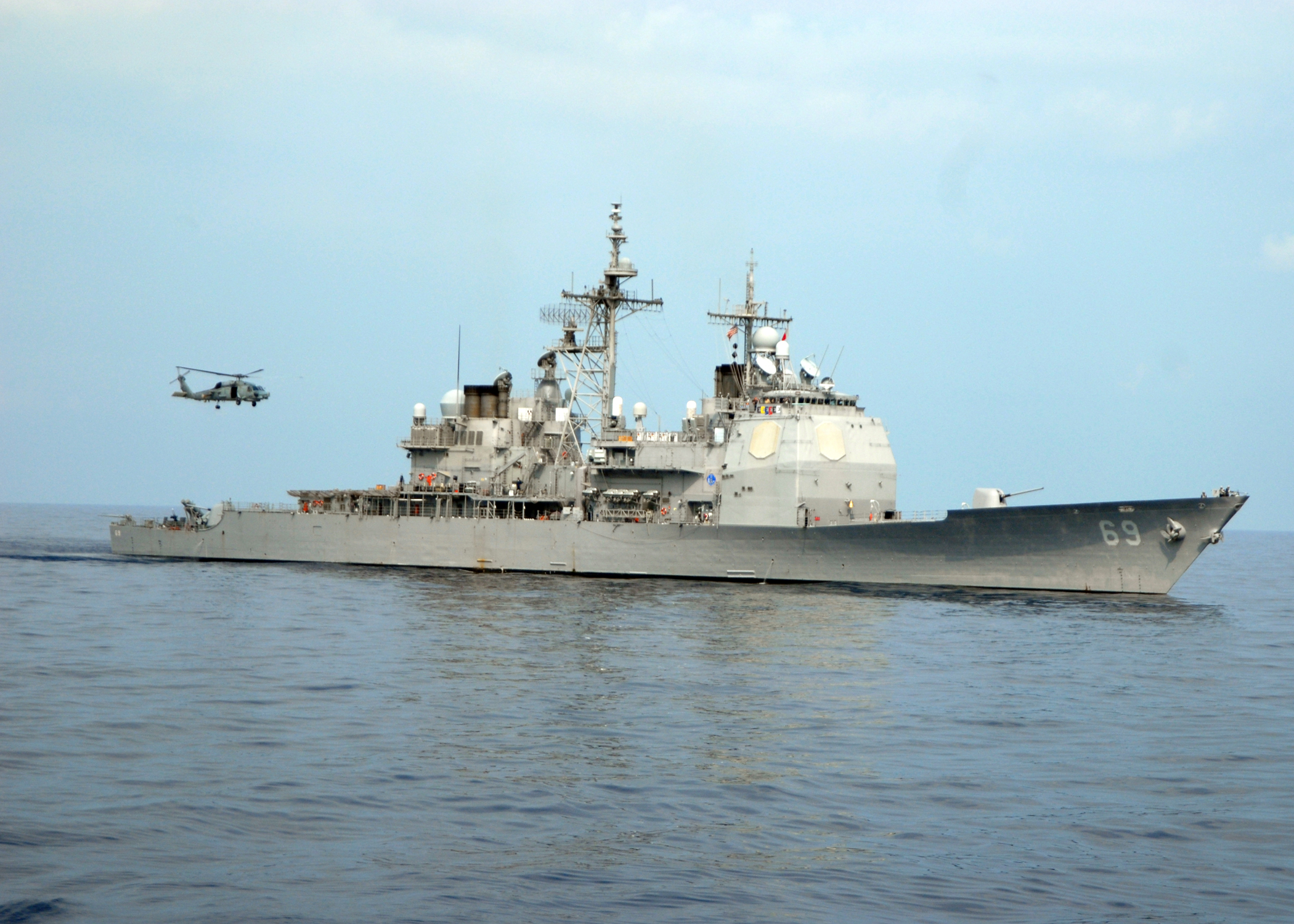
- USS Vicksburg in June 2007

History

United States
- Name: Vicksburg
- Namesake: Siege of Vicksburg
- Ordered: 25 February 1988
- Builder: Ingalls Shipbuilding
- Laid down: 30 May 1990
- Launched: 7 September 1991
- Sponsored by: Tricia Lott, wife of United States Senator Trent Lott
- Christened: 12 October 1991
- Acquired: 21 September 1992
- Commissioned: 14 November 1992
- Decommissioned: 28 June 2024
- Renamed: 8 December 1989, from Port Royal
- Stricken: 26 July 2024
- Home port: Mayport (1992 - 2016); Norfolk (2016 - 2024)
- Identification: Call sign: NVMS; Hull number: CG-69
- Motto: Key to Victory
- Fate: Towed to scrap
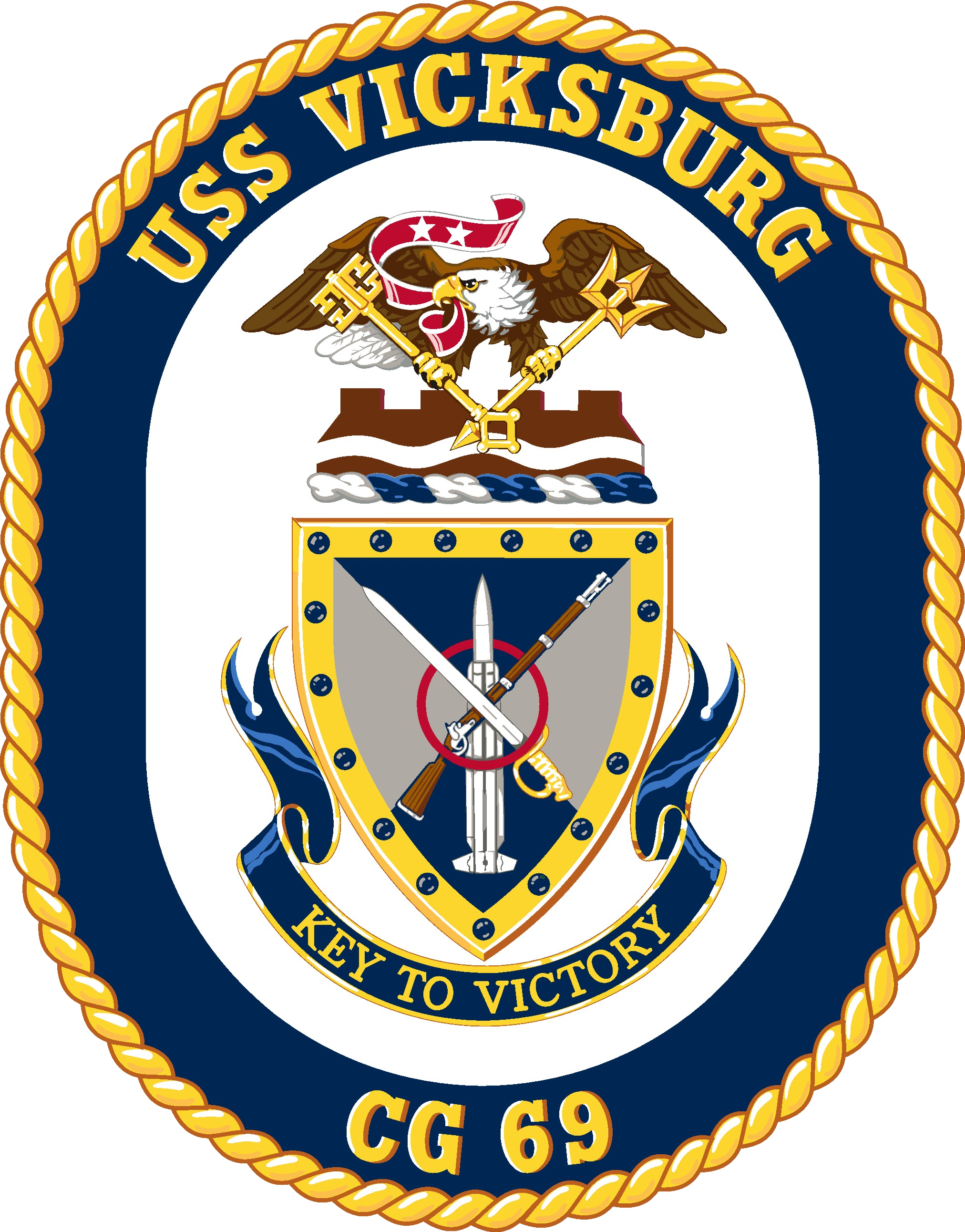
- Badge

General characteristics
- Class & type: Ticonderoga-class cruiser
- Displacement: Approx. 9,600 long tons (9,800 t) full load
- Length: 567 feet (173 m)
- Beam: 55 feet (16.8 meters)
- Draft: 34 feet (10.2 meters)
- Propulsion: 4 × General Electric LM2500 gas turbine engines; 2 × controllable-reversible pitch propellers; 2 × rudders
- Speed: 32.5 knots (60 km/h; 37.4 mph)
- Complement: 30 officers and 300 enlisted
- Sensors & processing systems: AN/SPY-1A/B multi-function radar; AN/SPS-49 air search radar (Removed on some ships); AN/SPG-62 fire control radar; AN/SPS-73 surface search radar; AN/SPQ-9 gun fire control radar; AN/SQQ-89(V)1/3 - A(V)15 Sonar suite, consisting of: AN/SQS-53B/C/D active sonar; AN/SQR-19 TACTAS, AN/SQR-19B ITASS, & MFTA passive sonar; AN/SQQ-28 light airborne multi-purpose system
- Armament: 2 × 61 cell Mk 41 vertical launch systems containing; 122 × mix of: RIM-66M-5 Standard SM-2MR Block IIIB; RIM-156A SM-2ER Block IV; RIM-161 SM-3; RIM-162A ESSM; RIM-174A Standard ERAM; BGM-109 Tomahawk; RUM-139A VL-ASROC; 8 × RGM-84 Harpoon missiles; 2 × 5 in (127 mm)/62 caliber Mark 45 Mod 4 lightweight gun; 2 × Mk 38 25 mm Machine Gun Systems; 2–4 × .50 in (12.7 mm) cal. machine gun; 2 × Phalanx CIWS Block 1B; 2 × Mk 32 12.75 in (324 mm) triple torpedo tubes
- Aircraft carried: 2 × MH-60R Seahawk LAMPS Mk III helicopters.

USS Vicksburg (CG-69) was a Ticonderoga-class guided missile cruiser that served in the United States Navy. She was named for the Siege of Vicksburg fought during the American Civil War.

Vicksburg was built by Ingalls Shipbuilding, at Pascagoula, Mississippi and commissioned on 14 November 1992. The ship first deployed in 1994 and last deployed in 2015. Vicksburg was decommissioned 28 June 2024 after spending 8 years in the Navy's Cruiser Modernization program.

Vicksburg was equipped with the Aegis Combat System and was capable of facing threats in the air, on the sea, ashore, and underneath the sea. She was also capable of carrying two SH-60 Sea Hawk Light Airborne Multi-Purpose System (LAMPS III) helicopters.

The previous Vicksburg was a Cleveland-class light cruiser during and after World War II. Vicksburg's crest has two stars on the streamer in the eagle's beak representing the two battle stars awarded to her predecessor.

== History ==
=== 1990s ===
Vicksburg was built by Ingalls Shipbuilding, at Pascagoula, Mississippi. Her keel was laid down on 30 May 1990, and she was launched on 7 September 1991. Vicksburg was sponsored by Tricia Lott, wife of United States Senator, Trent Lott. On 12 October 1991, Mrs. Lott christened CG-69 as Vicksburg. She was commissioned on 14 November 1992. Vicksburg was originally named Port Royal, but the name was changed before the keel was laid.

On her maiden cruise in 1994, Vicksburg was assigned to the USS Saratoga battle group, which was stationed off the coast of Montenegro. Vicksburg participated in Operation Deny Flight and Operation Provide Promise, serving as an airspace command and control platform. In May 1994, Vicksburg participated in NATO's "Dynamic Impact 94" exercise in the western Mediterranean, and in August 1994 Vicksburg joined Operation Able Vigil, helping to intercept Cuban migrants crossing the Florida Straits. In September 1994, Vicksburg escorted the aircraft carrier USS Dwight D. Eisenhower to Haiti as part of Operation Uphold Democracy.

Vicksburg returned from a 6-month deployment in March 1996. During the deployment, Vicksburg participated in Operation Southern Watch in the Persian Gulf. Vicksburg also performed Maritime Interception Operations to enforce UN sanctions that prohibited exports from Iraq. Vicksburg conducted over 85 boardings. At that time, the primary contraband was dates carried by 70–100 feet (21–30 m) dhows. Vicksburg visited Italy, Spain, and the United Arab Emirates during the deployment.

In 1997, Vicksburg deployed to the Mediterranean Sea with the USS John F. Kennedy carrier battle group (CVBG).

In 1998, Vicksburg and Hué City had problems integrating AEGIS Baseline 6 and Cooperative Engagement Capability (CEC), rendering the ships unavailable for service. The USS John F. Kennedy CVBG deployed in September 1999 without Vicksburg and Hué City.

In 1999, Vicksburg participated in BALTOPS '99 and UNITAS 40–99.

=== 2000s ===
In May 2000, Lockheed Martin announced that Vicksburg and Hué City completed a series of live missile firing exercises. The tests came after two years of integration and testing and paved the way for further test efforts with the entire battlegroup. Five test targets were engaged including low and high altitude threats and severe electronic countermeasures. The test also included a demonstration of engage on remote (EOR) which allowed one ship to complete an engagement against a target solely using data from a second ship. In 2001, Vicksburg and the rest of the John F. Kennedy CVBG extensively tested the CEC system. Following the September 11 attacks, the battle group supported Operation Noble Eagle.

In February 2002, Vicksburg deployed with the John F. Kennedy carrier battlegroup (CVBG), initially to the Mediterranean Sea. In March 2002, Vicksburg was part of the John F. Kennedy CVBG as she relieved the USS Theodore Roosevelt CVBG, in support of Operation Enduring Freedom. On 16 June 2002, off the coast of Oman, Vicksburg launched an SH-60B helicopter from HSL-42, Det 7, to assist Stolt Spray. The tanker was standing by to assist the foundering motor vessel al Murthada, but monsoon conditions prevented its assistance. Vicksburg's helicopter transferred al Murthada's distressed mariners, who had been adrift for eight days, to Stolt Spray for further transportation.

In March 2003, she was assigned to Naval Surface Group Two. In December 2004, Vicksburg and the John F. Kennedy battlegroup returned from a six-month deployment to the Middle East.

Vicksburg departed on a surge deployment to the middle east on 26 January 2006. In February, Vicksburg became the first US Navy ship to refuel from a new Defense Fuel Supply Point in Djibouti. Vicksburg returned in June 2006. On 16 February 2007, Vicksburg was awarded the 2006 Battle "E" award. She was part of Carrier Strike Group Twelve, which was led by USS Enterprise (CVN-65) until December 2012.

25 January 2008, Vicksburg returned to Mayport following a six-month deployment to the Persian Gulf. In February 2009, she deployed to the Persian Gulf as part of the Dwight D. Eisenhower carrier strike group.

=== 2010s ===
In 2010, Vicksburg deployed for a three-month Theater Security Cooperation Surge deployment to Northern Europe. The ship conducted exercises with the Norwegian Navy and then participated in the Joint Warrior 10-1 multinational exercise.

Vicksburg deployed with the Enterprise CVBG in March 2012 on the carrier's final deployment. Vicksburg visited Piraeus, Greece, in late March 2012. Vicksburg conducted operations with the French frigate Cassard from 16 to 24 April 2012. Vicksburg visited Bahrain at the end of May and again in August. Vicksburg visited Lisbon, Portugal on October 17, 2012. Vicksburg returned to Mayport in November 2012.

The US Navy was planning to retire Vicksburg along with eight other Ticonderoga-class cruisers in fiscal year 2013 in line with US Defense Department budget reductions. The ship was scheduled to be decommissioned on 31 March 2013. Language inserted into the FY13 House of Representatives Defense Bill retained Vicksburg and two other of her sister ships that were slated for decommissioning. Retaining the ships in the active fleet was not supported by the United States Secretary of Defense, but the outcome was determined by the final FY13 Defense Bill negotiated with the United States Senate. Vicksburg and two other Ticonderoga-class cruisers were retained under the National Defense Authorization Act for Fiscal Year 2013.

In 2014, the cruiser participated in Joint Warrior 14-2, a United Kingdom-led multinational exercise in British coastal waters. The training was designed to provide allied forces a multiwarfare environment to prepare for global operations. On 4 December 2014, Vicksburg departed Naval Station Mayport to relieve the cruiser USS Leyte Gulf as the Standing NATO Maritime Group 2 (SNMG2) flagship and to support theater security cooperation efforts in Europe. Vicksburg relieved Leyte Gulf as SNMG2 Flagship in Naples on 20 December 2014. Vicksburg and SNMG2 deployed to the Black Sea 4 March 2015. Vicksburg and SNMG2 visited Varna, Bulgaria 7–8 March and Constanta, Romania around 16 March 2015. Vicksburg and SNMG2 left the Black sea around 20 March. In April, Vicksburg and SNMG2 visited Faslane, Scotland along with Standing NATO Mine Counter-Measures Groups One and Two for Joint Warrior 15–1. In May, Vicksburg and SNMG2 participated in the anti-submarine exercise Dynamic Mongoose. The ship returned to Mayport on 11 July 2015.

On 1 July 2016, Vicksburg was transferred from Carrier Strike Group Twelve to the Naval Sea Systems Command (NAVSEA) and entered the Navy's Cruiser Modernization program. The ship's homeport was changed to Norfolk and the crew was reduced from 350 to less than 50. In 2017, BAE Systems announced it was awarded a special selected restricted availability (SSRA) contract for up to $42.9 million. The work was planned for April to September 2017 at BAE Systems Norfolk Ship Repair and was part of Vicksburg's modernization.

=== 2020s ===
In January 2020, Vicksburg was sent to BAE Systems for an $175 million, 18-month Service Life Extension Program (SLEP). In May 2022, Vicksburg was reported to be 85% completed with its modernization and was expected to be complete by summer 2023. According to Rep. Kay Granger (R-Texas), "Since 2020, the Navy has awarded nearly $500 million in contracts to upgrade the cruiser."

The Navy requested to decommission Vicksburg in its FY23 and FY24 budgets. Navy Undersecretary Erik Raven stated that this was due to the ship's "material condition, life remaining, cost, ... time to upgrade ... and the warfighting value."

In March 2023, the Navy submitted to Congress a list of 11 ships it sought to retire, including Vicksburg which has been in the modernization program since 2016. According to Navy Secretary Carlos Del Toro in April 2023, Vicksburg and Cowpens "will never see another deployment, regardless of how much money we put into them." The Navy reported that costs of the modernization have increased to $500 million.

In March 2024, the Navy announced plans to inactivate Vicksburg on 29 June 2024. In early 2024, all modernization work had ceased on Vicksburg. By 11 April 2024, Vicksburg had been stripped of topside gear and antennas and towed from BAE Systems shipyard to NS Norfolk for decommissioning. The ship was decommissioned during a ceremony in Norfolk on 28 June 2024. According to the NVR, the ship was officially decommissioned and stricken on 26 July 2024. The ship was towed from Norfolk to Philadelphia Naval Inactive Ship Maintenance Facility by MV Gary Chouest starting on 4 September 2024.

As of October 21, 2026, USS Vicksburg arrived at Brownsville, TX for scrapping.

== Awards ==

Coast Guard Unit Commendation with Operational Distinguishing Device	Navy Meritorious Unit Commendation (4)	Battle Effectiveness Award with E device (9)
National Defense Service Medal (2)	Armed Forces Expeditionary Medal (2)	Southwest Asia Service Medal (1)
Global War on Terrorism Expeditionary Medal	Global War on Terrorism Service Medal	Armed Forces Service Medal
Humanitarian Service Medal	Sea Service Ribbon (6)	NATO Medal (Yugoslavia)

- CNO Afloat Safety Award (LANTFLT) - (2006)

== In popular culture ==
- Vicksburg is featured prominently in the 2012 naval thriller, Fire of the Raging Dragon, by Don Brown.

== See also ==
- Aegis Combat System
