= DDG(X) =

U.S. Navy program to develop a class of principal surface combatants

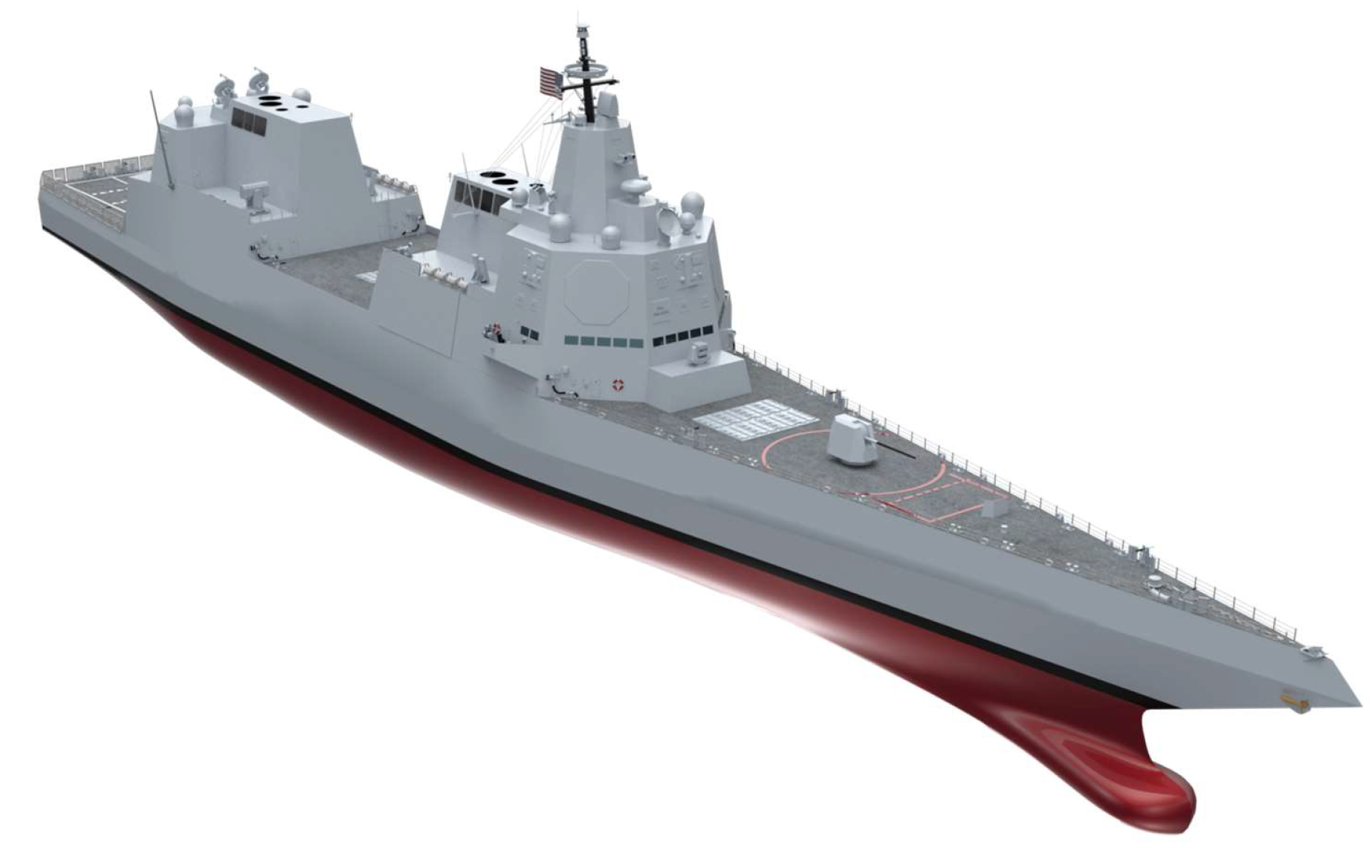
- DDG(X) concept as presented in the 2022 Surface Navy Association symposium

Class overview
- Name: DDG(X)
- Operators: United States Navy
- Preceded by: Ticonderoga-class cruiser Flight II; Arleigh Burke-class destroyer Flight III; Zumwalt-class destroyer
- Succeeded by: Trump-class battleship (proposed)
- Built: 2032 (planned)

General characteristics (conceptual)
- Type: Guided-missile destroyer
- Tonnage: 13,290 long tons (13,500 t)
- Length: approx 183 m (597 ft)
- Propulsion: Integrated Power System
- Sensors & processing systems: AN/SPY-6(V)1 AESA 3D radar; AN/SPQ-9B surface search and fire-control radar; AN/SPG-62 fire-control radar
- Armament: 127 mm/62 cal Mk 45 Mod 4; 3 × 32 Mark 41 Vertical Launching System (VLS) 96 cells (swappable with larger VLS systems); 2 × 21-cell (42 cells total) RIM-116 Rolling Airframe Missile launchers; 2 × Mark 32 Surface Vessel Torpedo Tubes; 150/600 kW lasers (possible upgrade)
- Aviation facilities: Flight deck and enclosed hangar

The DDG(X) or Next-Generation Guided-Missile Destroyer program of the United States Navy aims to develop a class of surface combatants to succeed 22 Flight II Ticonderoga-class cruisers and 28 Flight I/II Arleigh Burke-class destroyers. The program is the culmination of the Large Surface Combatant (LSC) initiative that followed the cancellation of CG(X) and curtailing of the procurement of the Zumwalt-class destroyers. The ships will become the principal large surface combatants of the U.S. Navy. Compared to their predecessors, they will incorporate more powerful sensors and have more room and weight margin for growth.

On 22 December 2025, the Department of Defense under the second Trump administration announced a Trump-class battleship, stating that "the new Trump-class battleships will replace the Navy's previous plans to develop a new class of destroyer, the DDG(X)." As of January 2026, the Trump class remains a proposal and has not received any funding or congressional approval, with the DDG(X) program still funded and ongoing. In the FY2026 budget justification books, the Navy's documents said that "A formal acquisition strategy for DDG(X) is still being developed", indicating the intent to proceed with the program despite their prior statements.

== History ==
With the cancellation of the CG(X) in 2010, the U.S. Navy embarked on new studies and programs for the future of the air defense role fulfilled by the Ticonderoga-class cruisers. Because the cruisers were built on the Spruance-class destroyer hulls, they had limited upgrade potential due to space, weight, and power margins.

Meanwhile, the procurement of the Zumwalt-class destroyers was severely curtailed due to high costs and a renewed emphasis on air and missile defense for larger combatants. Eventually, the Navy chose to upgrade the Ticonderogas and procure the Flight III Arleigh Burke-class destroyers with the enhanced AN/SPY-6 and improved combat systems to supplement the Ticonderogas for air and missile defense.

The Navy also launched studies into a Future Surface Combatant (FSC) to replace the Ticonderoga-class—which will reach the end of their service lives in the 2020s—as well as older flights of the Arleigh Burke class. The FSC evolved into the Large Surface Combatant (LSC) program, which became the DDG(X). The DDG(X) program office was established in June 2021. In February 2022, Gibbs & Cox was contracted to provide design and engineering support. The Navy is retaining the lead design role.

== Design ==
=== Hull ===
Various hull configurations are currently being tested at Naval Surface Warfare Center (NSWC) Carderock and NSWC Philadelphia. A concept presented at the 2022 Surface Warfare Symposium depicts an angular hull form with displacement of 13,290 long tons (13,500 t), a conventional bow and a superstructure reminiscent of the Zumwalt-class destroyer. Future vessels of the class may be lengthened with a payload module for additional capabilities.

The DDG(X) hull design will incorporate lessons and elements from both the Arleigh Burke and Zumwalt designs. The vessels will be able to accommodate larger missile launch systems, improved survivability, and space, weight, power, and cooling margins for future growth. As the ships will replace the Ticonderoga-class cruisers, they will have air defense command and control facilities and accommodations for an admiral's staff.

=== Propulsion ===
The DDG(X) will use Integrated Power System (IPS), a modern integrated turboelectric drive as employed on the Zumwalt class. The vessels are expected to have 50% greater range, a 120% greater time on station, and a 25% reduction in fuel burn compared to current U.S. Navy destroyers.

=== Sensors ===
The sensors will initially be enlarged variants of the AN/SPY-6 radar mounted on the Flight III Arleigh Burke-class destroyers. The hull is designed with provisions for upgraded sensors in the future, including larger radar arrays.

=== Weapons ===
The Navy states that the baseline DDG(X) design, like the Flight III DDG-51 design, is to include 96 standard Vertical Launch System (VLS) cells, with an ability to incorporate 12 large missile launch cells in place of 32 of the 96 standard VLS cells. The vessels will be initially fitted with 32-cell blocks of the Mark 41 Vertical Launching System, with the concept image of the hull showing at least three such blocks. Instead of the Mk 41 block, large-cell launchers for hypersonic missiles can also be accepted, where existing naval missiles like RIM-174 Standard ERAM and BGM-109 Tomahawk could be quad-packed into the larger canister, leveraging design improvements in the Mk 41 Single Cell Launcher and U.S. Army's Typhon missile launcher from the Mid-Range Capability (MRC) program.

The concept image shows the vessel mounting a main 127 mm/62 cal Mark 45 Mod 4 gun. Upgraded versions of the class may incorporate directed energy weapons, with lasers ranging from 150 to 600 kW. A new rendering released by Program Executive Office (PEO) Ships and obtained by Naval News in early January 2025 shows DDG(X) omitting the 5-inch Mark 45 naval gun entirely.

== See also ==
- Aegis system equipped vessels (ASEV)
- Cruiser Baseline
- CG(X)
- SSN(X)
- KDDX-class destroyer
- Type 055 destroyer
- Type 83 destroyer
- Project 18-class destroyer
