= Cruiser Baseline =

Guided missile cruiser design study

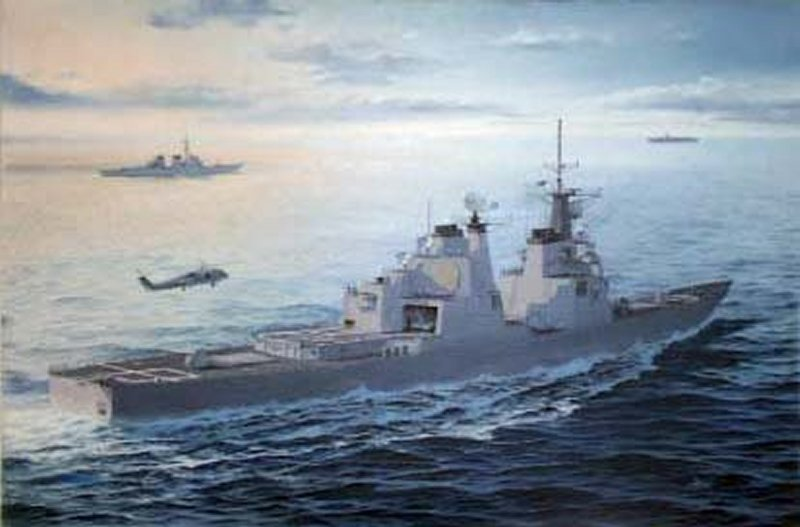
- Artist conception of the Cruiser Baseline by Richard Allison

Class overview
- Name: Guided Missile Cruiser Baseline (CGBL)
- Builders: Never built
- Operators: United States Navy
- Subclasses: Ticonderoga class

General characteristics
- Type: Guided missile cruiser
- Displacement: 13,675 long tons (13,894 t) (full load)
- Length: 620 ft (189.0 m) (pp)
- Beam: 69.0 ft (21.0 m)
- Propulsion: 4 × General Electric LM2500 gas turbines, two shafts, 105,000 shp (78 MW)
- Speed: 30.5 knots (56.5 km/h)
- Sensors & processing systems: Same as CG-52: AN/SPY-1A/B multi-function radar AN/SPS-49 air search radar AN/SPG-62 fire control radar AN/SPS-73 surface search radar AN/SPQ-9 gun fire control radar AN/SQQ-89(V) Sonar suite
- Armament: Same as CG-52: 2× 61-cell Mk 41 vertical launch systems for a total of 122 VLS cells: RIM-66 Standard (SM-1MR/SM-2MR) RUM-139 VL-ASROC BGM-109 Tomahawk 8× RGM-84 Harpoon missiles 2× 5-inch/54-caliber Mark 45 gun 2× Phalanx CIWS 2× Mk 38 25 mm Machine Gun Systems 2× Mark 32 surface vessel torpedo tubes
- Armor: Kevlar splinter protection in critical areas
- Aircraft carried: 2× SH-60 helicopters

The Guided Missile Cruiser Baseline (CGBL), or Cruiser Baseline for short, was a design study for a guided missile cruiser that would have the combat capabilities of VLS-capable Ticonderoga-class cruiser (CG-52 onwards) while designing the hull to DDG-51 (Arleigh Burke-class destroyer) standards and technology. The resulting cruiser design was considerably larger than the Ticonderoga-class design, owing to increased margins and reserves for weight and mission growth throughout the anticipated service life.

== Design ==
The Aegis Combat System was initially envisaged to be mounted on a "high-low" mix of large Strike Cruisers (CSGN) and smaller guided missile destroyers (DDG); the latter was initially designated DDG-47 and would have the system mounted on a hull based on that of the Spruance-class destroyer. Due to the high expected costs, both the Strike Cruiser as well as the scaled-down CGN-42 alternative were canceled. With the requirements now transferred to the DDG-47 destroyers, the ships had flagship capabilities added and were redesignated as guided missile cruisers, or CG-47, and became the Ticonderoga-class cruiser. The new "low" end of the fleet would then be fulfilled by the DDG-51, or Arleigh Burke-class destroyer.

With the substantial weight of the Aegis system mounted on a Spruance-derived destroyer hull, the Ticonderoga class would have limited growth potential in terms of space, weight, and power margin. These margins were further eroded with the Flight II ships starting with USS Bunker Hill (CG-52), which were equipped with the Mark 41 vertical launch system. As a result of these limited margins, Naval Sea Systems Command (NAVSEA) initiated a design study to explore accommodating the capabilities of the VLS-capable Ticonderoga class onto a new cruiser hull with design and construction techniques of the Arleigh Burke class. This study, dubbed "Guided Missile Cruiser Baseline" (CGBL) or simply "Cruiser Baseline", would have the capabilities of CG-52 while having full design margins and service life reserves.

Using the same construction standards as the Arleigh Burke class, CGBL was modeled using the Navy's Advanced Ship System Evaluation Tool (ASSET); it would have a larger hull at 620-foot (189.0 m) length between perpendiculars and 69.0-foot (21.03 m) beam, with better seakeeping and a flush deck configuration to increase structural strength. It would also replace the Ticonderoga's lightweight aluminum superstructure with a steel one that would incorporate anti-fragment armor for greater structural strength and survivability. The superstructure and hull surfaces would be angled to reduce radar cross section (RCS). CGBL would also have a small secondary Combat Information Center (CIC) with Tomahawk missile launch capability, enabling the ship to continue operating and conduct offensive strikes even in the event of battle damage disabling the primary CIC. These features made CGBL considerably larger than the Ticonderoga and would displace 13,675 long tons (13,894 t) at full load. The machinery consisted of four General Electric LM2500 gas turbines, but with power increased to over 100,000 shaft horsepower (75,000 kW), giving the ship a top speed of 30.5 knots (35 mph; 56 km/h).

The CGBL was primarily a NAVSEA design study and mathematical model of an Aegis cruiser for analytical purposes, without any formal intention to build such a ship.

== See also ==
- Strike cruiser
- CG(X)

== Bibliography ==
- Friedman, Norman (1984). U.S. Cruisers: An Illustrated Design History. Annapolis, Maryland: Naval Institute Press. ISBN 978-0870217180.
