= Ticonderoga-class cruiser =

Class of guided missile cruisers

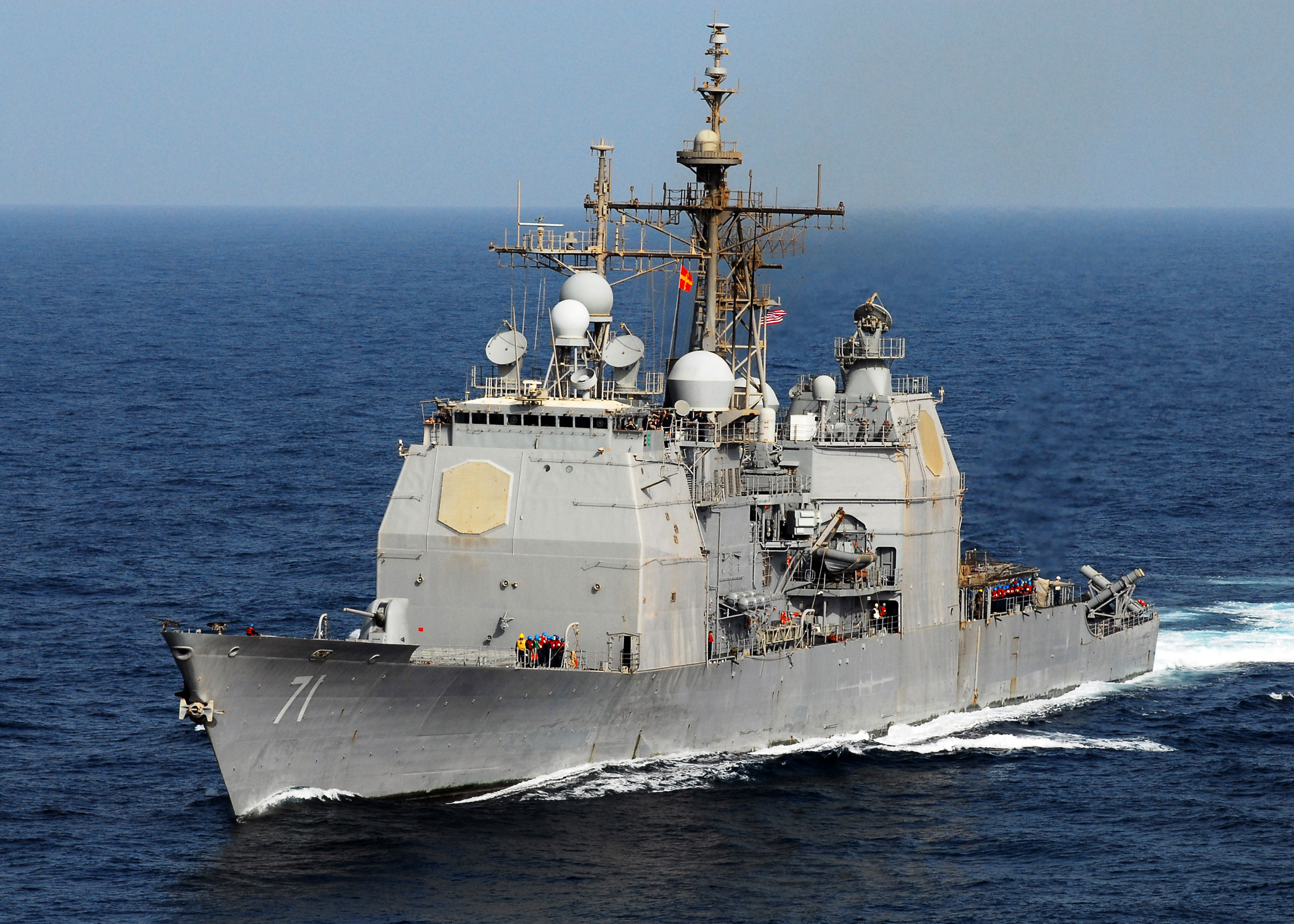
- USS Cape St. George, the most recent Ticonderoga-class cruiser still in service, in 2008

Class overview
- Name: Ticonderoga class
- Builders: Ingalls Shipbuilding; Bath Iron Works
- Operators: United States Navy
- Preceded by: Strike cruiser (planned, canceled); Virginia-class cruiser (actual)
- Succeeded by: CG(X) (planned, canceled); Arleigh Burke-class destroyer Flight III (actual); DDG(X) (planned)
- Subclasses: Cruiser Baseline (design study only)
- Cost: ~US$1,000,000,000 (equivalent to $2,172,204,760 in 2025) in 1994, for final ship
- Built: 1980–1994
- In commission: 1983–present
- Completed: 27
- Active: 5
- Laid up: 10
- Retired: 22

General characteristics
- Type: Guided-missile cruiser
- Displacement: Approx. 9,600 long tons (9,800 t) full load
- Length: 567 feet (173 m)
- Beam: 55 feet (16.8 meters)
- Draft: 34 feet (10.2 meters)
- Propulsion: 4 × General Electric LM2500 gas turbine engines; 2 × controllable-reversible pitch propellers; 2 × rudders
- Speed: 32.5 knots (60 km/h; 37.4 mph)
- Range: 6,000 nmi (11,000 km) at 20 kn (37 km/h); 3,300 nmi (6,100 km) at 30 kn (56 km/h).
- Complement: 30 officers and 300 enlisted
- Sensors & processing systems: AN/SPY-1A/B multi-function radar; AN/SPS-49 air search radar (Removed on some ships); AN/SPG-62 fire control radar; AN/SPS-73 surface search radar; AN/SPQ-9 gun fire control radar; AN/SQQ-89(V)1/3 - A(V)15 Sonar suite, consisting of: AN/SQS-53B/C/D active sonar; AN/SQR-19 TACTAS, AN/SQR-19B ITASS, & MFTA passive sonar; AN/SQQ-28 light airborne multi-purpose system
- Electronic warfare & decoys: AN/SLQ-32 Electronic Warfare Suite; Mark 36 SRBOC; AN/SLQ-25 Nixie
- Armament: CG-47 – 51; 2 × Mk 26 missile launchers; 68 × RIM-66 SM-2; 20 × RUR-5 ASROC; 8 × RGM-84 Harpoon missiles; 2 × 5 in (127 mm)/54 caliber Mark 45 lightweight gun; 2–4 × .50 in (12.7 mm) cal. machine gun; 2 × Phalanx CIWS; 2 × Mk 32 12.75 in (324 mm) triple torpedo tubes; CG-52 – 73; 2 × 61 cell Mk 41 vertical launch systems containing; 122 × mix of: RIM-66M-5 Standard SM-2MR Block IIIB; RIM-156A SM-2ER Block IV; RIM-161 SM-3; RIM-162A ESSM; RIM-174A Standard ERAM; BGM-109 Tomahawk; RUM-139A VL-ASROC; 8 × RGM-84 Harpoon missiles; 2 × 5 in (127 mm)/62 caliber Mark 45 Mod 4 lightweight gun; 2 × Mk 38 25 mm Machine Gun Systems; 2–4 × .50 in (12.7 mm) cal. machine gun; 2 × Phalanx CIWS Block 1B; 2 × Mk 32 12.75 in (324 mm) triple torpedo tubes
- Armor: Limited Kevlar splinter protection in critical areas
- Aircraft carried: 2 × MH-60R Seahawk LAMPS Mk III helicopters.

The Ticonderoga class of guided-missile cruisers is a class of warships of the United States Navy, first ordered and authorized in the 1978 fiscal year. It was originally planned as a class of destroyers, but the increased combat capability offered by the Aegis Combat System and the passive phased-array AN/SPY-1 radar, together with the capability of operating as a flagship, were used to justify the change of the classification from DDG (guided-missile destroyer) to CG (guided-missile cruiser) shortly before the keels were laid down for Ticonderoga and Yorktown.

Ticonderoga-class guided-missile cruisers are multirole warships. Their Mk 41 VLS can fire Tomahawk cruise missiles to strike land targets or antiaircraft SM-2MR/ERs for defense against aircraft or antiship missiles. Their LAMPS III helicopters, RUM-139 ASROCs, and sonar systems allow them to perform antisubmarine missions. Ticonderoga-class ships are designed to be elements of carrier strike groups or amphibious ready groups, as well as perform missions such as interdiction or escort. With upgrades to their AN/SPY-1 systems and their associated missile payloads as part of the Aegis Ballistic Missile Defense System, members of the Mk 41 VLS Flight II variant of the class have also demonstrated proficiency as mobile antiballistic missile and antisatellite platforms, with USS Lake Erie (CG-70) being the first U.S. Navy warship to successfully shoot down an in-orbit satellite on February 20, 2008.

Of the 27 completed vessels, 19 were built by Ingalls Shipbuilding and eight by Bath Iron Works (BIW). All but one (Thomas S. Gates) of the ships in the class were originally named for noteworthy events in U.S. military history, although a second (originally named Chancellorsville) was renamed to USS Robert Smalls (CG-62) in March 2023, and at least 12 share their names with World War II–era aircraft carriers. As of September 2026, five ships remain active. Due to the high cost of maintenance and age, the entire class is being progressively retired; the last vessels are scheduled for decommissioning by 2030. Flight III Arleigh Burke-class destroyers will serve as short-term role replacements until the expected commissioning of DDG(X) destroyers in the 2030s.

== History ==
The Ticonderoga class was originally ordered as guided-missile destroyers, with the designation DDG-47. Under Chief of Naval Operations Admiral Elmo Zumwalt's "high-low mix", the Ticonderogas were intended to be lower-cost platforms for the new Aegis Combat System by mounting the system on a hull based on that of the Spruance-class destroyer. They were to complement the much larger and more capable strike cruiser (CSGN) comprising the high end, which were expected to act as flagships. However, with the cancellation of the strike cruiser, as well as the scaled-down CGN-42 (Virginia-class cruiser hull) alternative, the role was transferred to the DDG-47, which was then redesignated CG-47 in 1980. The Ticonderoga-class cruisers went on to form the high end of the fleet, with the later introduction of the Arleigh Burke-class destroyer forming the low end.

The initial five ships were equipped with a pair of Mark 26 missile launchers fore and aft, similar to the earlier Kidd-class destroyer (also derived from the Spruance, but without Aegis). Ships from CG-52 onwards were equipped with the Mk 41 vertical launch system, instead, to reduce manpower requirements. As the Aegis Combat System and the additional cruiser roles added substantial weight to the Spruance-derived hull, the design had limited growth potential in terms of weight and power margin. In the 1980s, a design study known as Cruiser Baseline was created to accommodate the capabilities of CG-52 onto a hull with design and construction techniques matching the DDG-51 (Arleigh Burke-class destroyer) for improved survivability and weight allowances, but was primarily a NAVSEA design study and mathematical model of an Aegis cruiser for analytical purposes, without any formal intention to build such a ship.

=== Proposed early retirement ===
Due to Budget Control Act of 2011 requirements to cut the Defense Budget for FY2013 and subsequent years, plans were being considered to decommission some of the Ticonderoga-class cruisers. For the U.S. Defense 2013 Budget Proposal, the U.S. Navy was to decommission seven cruisers early in fiscal years 2013 and 2014.

By October 2012, the U.S. Navy had decided not to retire four of the cruisers early to maintain the size of the fleet. Four Ticonderoga-class cruisers, plus 21 Arleigh Burke-class destroyers, were scheduled to be equipped for antiballistic missile and antisatellite operations.

In March 2019, the Navy proposed decommissioning the six oldest ships, Bunker Hill, Mobile Bay, Antietam, Leyte Gulf, San Jacinto, and Lake Champlain, in 2021 and 2022, instead of dry-docking them for life-extension maintenance updates as a cost-saving measure. This would not technically be an "early retirement", as the ships would be at their originally planned 35-year life dates, but they would be able to serve longer with the upgrades. The proposal needed the approval of Congress, which is usually hesitant to approve any actions that would reduce the size of the active combat fleet.

In December 2021, the House approved a bill that would allow the Navy to retire only five Ticonderoga-class cruisers versus the Navy's request to retire seven.

=== Proposed and scheduled retirements ===
The Ticonderoga class continues to be progressively retired from active service. In April 2022, the Navy requested to retire all 17 remaining cruisers by the end of Fiscal Year 2027. The schedule was as follows:

Proposed inactivation schedule
Fiscal year	Total	Affected vessels
2023	5	Bunker Hill (CG-52), Mobile Bay (CG-53), San Jacinto (CG-56), Lake Champlain (CG-57), Vicksburg (CG-69)
2024	3	Antietam (CG-54), Leyte Gulf (CG-55), Shiloh (CG-67)
2025	3	Philippine Sea (CG-58), Normandy (CG-60), Lake Erie (CG-70)
2026	4	Princeton (CG-59), Robert Smalls (CG-62), Cowpens (CG-63), Gettysburg (CG-64)
2027	2	Chosin (CG-65), Cape St. George (CG-71)

Both the House and Senate draft budgets explicitly forbade retiring Vicksburg by name, as the ship is nearing the end of a modernization as part of the Phased Modernization Program (also known as the 2-4-6 Program). The House budget prohibits the Navy from using any funds "to retire, prepare to retire, inactivate, or place in storage more than four guided-missile cruisers." Until the final budget is passed, all retirement requests are pending.

In November 2024, the United States Department of the Navy announced that Gettysburg, Chosin, and Cape St. George would have their service lives extended through 2029, following extensive upgrades as part of a modernization program.

=== Replacement ===
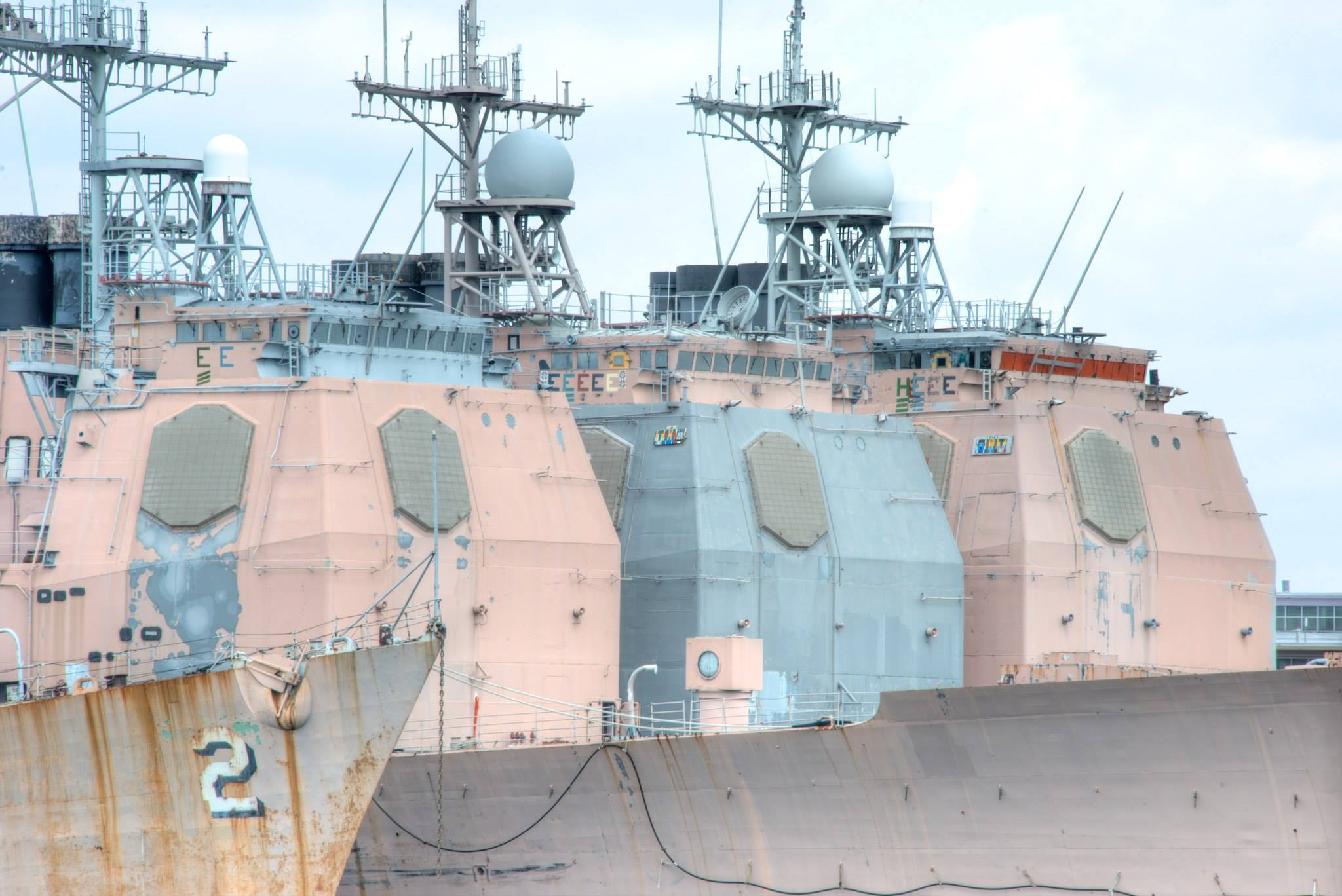
From left to right: ex-Thomas S. Gates, ex-Ticonderoga, and ex-Yorktown laid up in Philadelphia, May 2016

In their 2015 budget request, the Navy outlined a plan to operate 11 cruisers, while the other 11 were upgraded to a new standard. The upgraded cruisers would then start replacing the older ships, which would be retired starting in 2019. This would retain one cruiser per aircraft carrier group to host the group's air warfare commander, a role for which the destroyers do not have sufficient facilities. Flight III Arleigh Burke-class destroyers equipped with the Air and Missile Defense Radar provide enhanced coverage, but putting the radar on standard destroyer hulls does not allow enough room for extra staff and command-and-control facilities for the air warfare commander. Destroyers can be used tactically for air defense, but they augment cruisers that provide command and control in a carrier group and are primarily used for other missions such as defending other fleet units and keeping sea lanes open. Congress opposed the plan on the grounds that it makes completely retiring the ships easier for Navy officials once they are out of service. The Navy would have to retire all cruisers from the fleet by 2028 if all are kept in service, while deactivating half and gradually returning them into service could make 11 cruisers last from 2035 to 2045. Replacement of the cruisers was repeatedly delayed by funding due to commitment to the Columbia-class submarine, so work on a new cruiser was expected to begin in the mid-2020s and begin fielding by the mid-2030s.

Due to the large overlap in size and capabilities of its guided-missile cruisers and destroyers, the Navy eventually coalesced them into a single class of large, multimission ships with an emphasis on air and missile defense called Large Surface Combatants (LSC); in 2018, the Navy stated that a future LSC would have capabilities of the Flight III Arleigh Burke-class guided-missile destroyers as a starting baseline, while having future growth margins and air defense command and control of the Ticonderoga class. Consequently, the short-term replacement for the first decommissioned cruisers is the Flight III Arleigh Burke class starting in the mid-2020s, while the last of the Ticonderoga-class cruisers and Flights I and II of the Arleigh Burke class are to be replaced by the DDG(X) program in the early 2030s. The program office was established in June 2021, and design work was contracted starting in February 2022. Despite the designation, the DDG(X) is expected to be considerably larger and at least as capable as the Ticonderoga class.

== Design ==
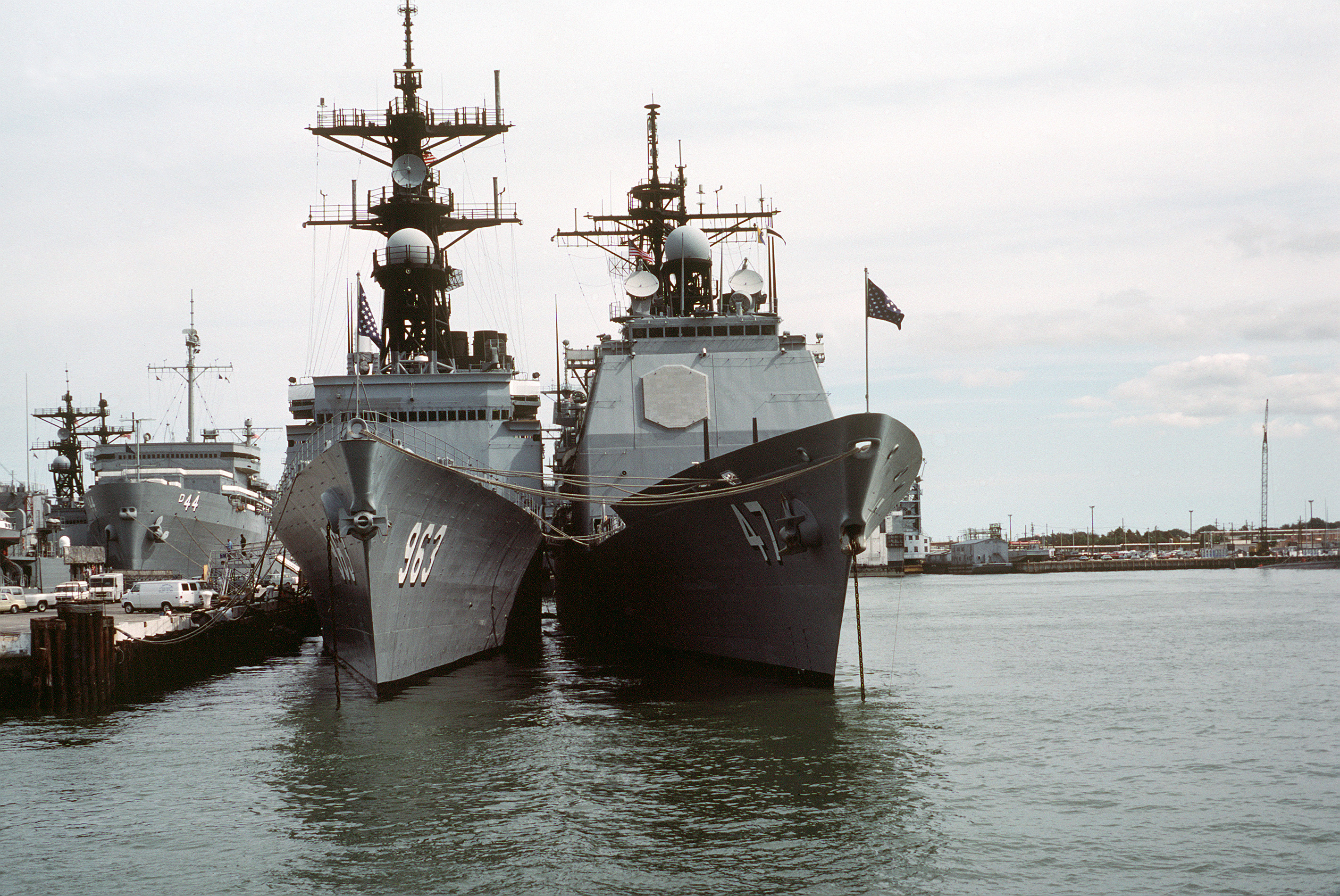
Ticonderoga-class cruisers (right) were built on the same hull as the Spruance-class destroyer (left).

The Ticonderoga-class cruiser's design was based on that of the Spruance-class destroyer. The Ticonderoga class introduced a new generation of guided-missile warships based on the Aegis phased-array radar that is capable of simultaneously scanning for threats, tracking targets, and guiding missiles to interception. When they were designed, they had the most powerful electronic warfare equipment and the most advanced underwater surveillance system in the U.S. Navy. These ships were one of the first classes of warships to be built in modules, rather than being assembled from the bottom up.

The greater size and equipment on the CG-47-class cruisers increased displacement from 6,900 tons of the DD-963-class destroyers to 9,600 tons of displacement for the heavier cruisers. Aegis cruisers can steam in any ocean and conduct multiwarfare operations in any sea. Some cruisers reported some structural problems in early service after extended periods in extremely heavy seas; they were generally corrected from the late 1980s to the mid-1990s. Several ships had superstructure cracks, which were repaired.

These ships' superstructures were a modification of that on the Spruance-class destroyers and were required to support two deckhouses (one forward for antennas forward and starboard), and the aft deckhouse housed the aft and port antenna arrays. The later Arleigh Burke-class Aegis destroyers are designed from the keel up to carry the SPY-1D radars and have them all clustered together on the forward deckhouse, saving space and weight and simplifying cooling requirements. The radar support equipment is closer together, minimizing cable runs and concentrating support equipment.

Operations research was used to study manpower requirements for the Ticonderoga class. It found that four officers and 44 enlisted sailors could be removed from the ship's complement by removing traditional posts that had been made obsolete. However, manpower savings achieved by eliminating the very manpower-intensive Mk 26 guided missile system and replacing it with the far more capable and versatile Mk 41 Vertical Launching System (VLS) were harder to emulate with the Mk 45 127 mm (5") gun systems. The Aegis Cruisers are "double-enders" employing two large-caliber guns, one on each end.

=== Vertical Launching System ===
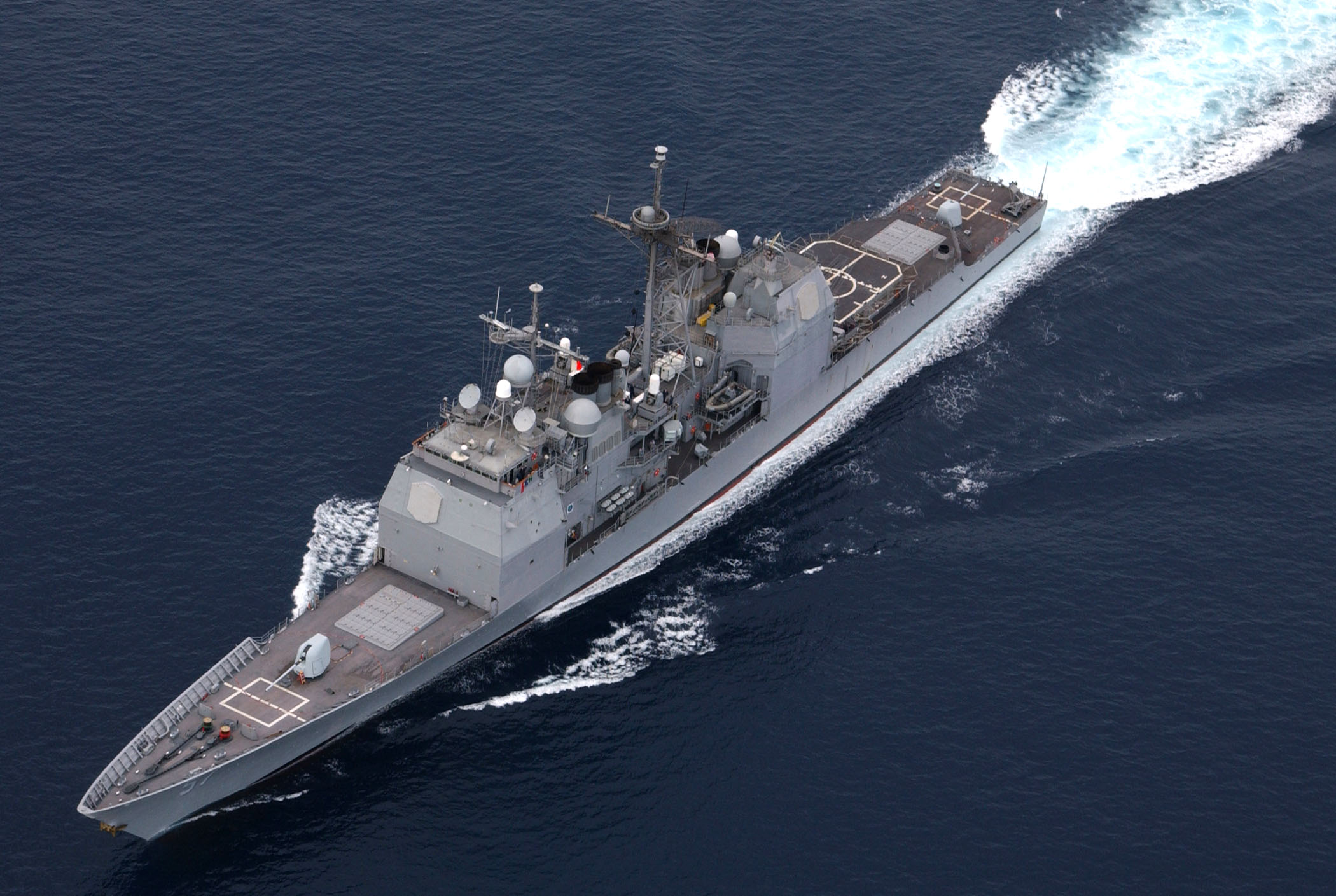
An overhead view of the Ticonderoga class Lake Champlain, with VLS visible fore and aft as the gray boxes near the bow and stern of the ship

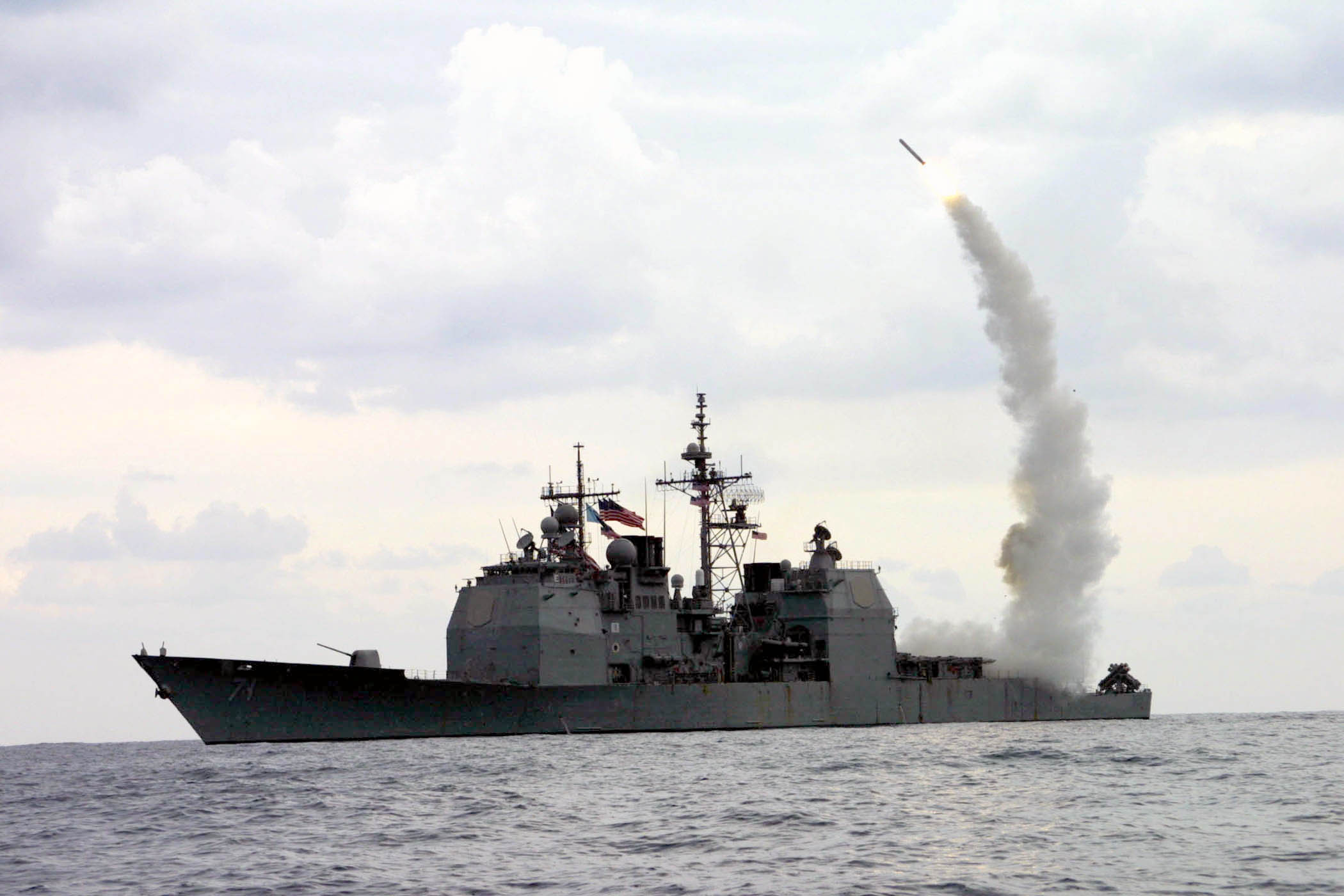
Side view of USS Cape St. George as it fires another Tomahawk missile during Operation Iraqi Freedom, 23 March 2003

In addition to the added radar capability, the Ticonderoga-class ships built after USS Thomas S. Gates (CG-51) included two Mark 41 VLSs, which allow the ship to have 122 missile-storage and launching tubes that can carry a wide variety of missiles, including Tomahawk cruise missiles, Standard Missile -2MR/ER and -6 surface-to-air missiles, Evolved SeaSparrow Missiles surface-to-air missiles, and RUM-139 antisubmarine warfare (ASW) ASROCs. More importantly, the VLS enables all missiles to be on full standby at any given time, shortening the warship's response time before firing. The original five ships (Ticonderoga, Yorktown, Vincennes, Valley Forge, and Thomas S. Gates) had Mark 26 twin-arm launchers that limited their missile capacity to a total of 88 missiles and could only fire the SM-2MR and RUM-139. After the end of the Cold War, the less-capable original five warships were limited to duties close to the home waters of the United States.

In October 2024, the US Navy reported the successful testing of a prototype transferrable reload at-sea method for replenishment. This method, as performed on USS Chosin, intends to reduce loading time.

=== Upgrades ===
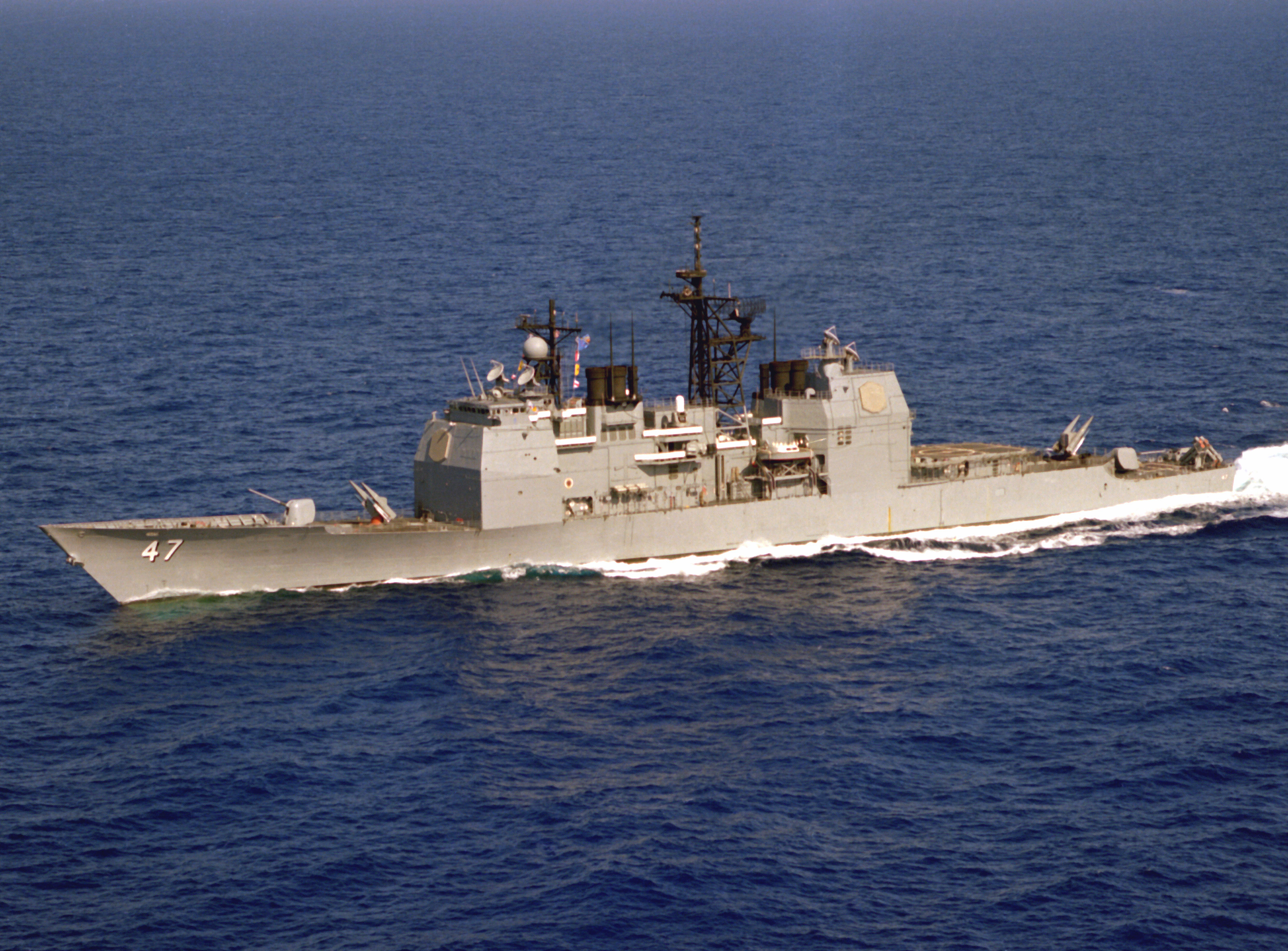
The older Ticonderoga with the pre-VLS twin-arm launchers visible fore and aft

Originally, the U.S. Navy had intended to replace its fleet of Ticonderoga-class guided-missile cruisers with cruisers produced as part of the CG(X) missile cruiser program; however, severe budget cuts from the 21st-century surface combatant program coupled with the increasing cost of the Zumwalt-class destroyer program resulted in the CG(X) program being canceled. The Ticonderoga-class cruisers were instead to be replaced by Flight III Arleigh Burke-class destroyers.

All five of the twin-arm (Mk-26) cruisers have been decommissioned. In 2003, the newer 22 of the 27 ships (CG-52 to CG-73) in the class were upgraded to keep them combat-relevant, giving the ships a service life of 35 years. In the years leading up to their decommissioning, the five twin-arm ships had been assigned primarily home-waters duties, acting as command ships for destroyer squadrons assigned to the eastern Pacific and western Atlantic areas.

As of July 2013, two cruisers have completed hull, mechanical, and electrical upgrades, and eight cruisers have had combat systems upgrades. These include an upgrade of the Aegis computational system with new computers and equipment cabinets, the SPQ-9B radar system upgrade introducing an increased capability over only gunfire control, optical fiber data communications and software upgrades, and modifications to the vertical launching system allowing two eight-cell modules to fire the RIM-162 ESSM. The most recent upgrade packages include SM-6 and Naval Integrated Fire Control – Counter Air capability. Another upgrade is improving the SQQ-89A(V)15 sonar with a multifunction towed array. Hull, sonar, radar, electrical, computer, and weapons systems upgrades can cost up to $250 million per ship.

== Service ==
=== Downing of Iran Air Flight 655 ===
USS Vincennes (CG-49) achieved notoriety in 1988 when, amid a running gun battle with Iranian Revolutionary Guard gunboats, she shot down Iran Air Flight 655, resulting in 290 civilian deaths. The commanding officer of USS Vincennes, William C. Rogers III, believed the airliner to be an Iranian Air Force F-14 Tomcat fighter jet on an attack vector, based on misreported radar returns. The investigation report recommended that the Aegis large-screen display be changed to allow the display of altitude information on plots and that stress factors on personnel using Aegis be studied.

=== Interception of United States satellite USA-193 ===
On 14 February 2008, the United States Department of Defense (DoD) announced that USS Lake Erie (CG-70) would attempt to hit the dead satellite USA-193 over the North Pacific Ocean just before it would burn up on re-entry. On 20 February 2008, around 22:30 EST (21 February, 03:30 UTC), an SM-3 was fired from Lake Erie, which struck the satellite. The military intended that the missile's kinetic energy would rupture the hydrazine fuel tank, allowing the toxic fuel to be consumed during re-entry. The DoD confirmed that the missile had directly hit the fuel tank.

=== Downing of United States fighter F/A-18F Super Hornet ===
On 22 December 2024, USS Gettysburg (CG-64) shot down a F/A-18F Super Hornet belonging to Strike Fighter Squadron 11 (VFA-11) and flying off USS Harry S. Truman (CVN-75). USCENTCOM stated that both the pilot and weapon systems officer ejected and were recovered safely shortly after, with only one receiving minor injuries after an initial assessment. Gettysburg also fired on a second F/A-18 and missed by about 100 feet. The missile missed due to the pilot performing evasive maneuvers. Although the downing was claimed by a Houthi general (who had made false claims in the past), USCENTCOM maintains it was not the result of hostile fire.

== Ships in class ==
As part of the federal budget, the Navy had originally requested to decommission seven cruisers in the fiscal year (FY) 2022, releasing a schedule of when these ships would be retired, (note that as opposed to calendar years, fiscal years run from 1 October to 30 September). When Congress passed the final budget, they limited that number of retired cruisers to five. Concerns of lawmakers included the number of ships available in the battle force, how fast retired ships could be replaced with new ones, and overall costs. The budget did not specify which ships were to be retired, but did specify certain ships that could not be retired due to factors such as expenditures on recent modernization programs.

The table below includes the proposed retirements from the latest budget request for FY 2023. The retirements for the next fiscal year are proposed by the Navy, and they are not official until approved by Congress. Those for the next four years are proposed only and must be requested in that year's budget request. Until the final budget is passed, all retirement requests are pending. In November 2024, the Navy announced that Gettysburg, Chosin, and Cape St. George would remain in service into 2029.

Name	Hull no.	Builder	Laid down	Launched	Commissioned	Decommissioned	Service life	Homeport/Reserve Fleet Berth	Status
Mark 26 twin-arm missile launcher variant
Ticonderoga	CG-47	Ingalls Shipbuilding	21 January 1980	25 April 1981	22 January 1983	30 September 2004	21 years, 252 days	n/a	Scrapped 2022
Yorktown	CG-48	Ingalls Shipbuilding	19 October 1981	17 January 1983	4 July 1984	10 December 2004	20 years, 159 days	n/a	Scrapped 2024
Vincennes	CG-49	Ingalls Shipbuilding	19 October 1982	14 January 1984	6 July 1985	29 June 2005	19 years, 358 days	n/a	Scrapped 2011
Valley Forge	CG-50	Ingalls Shipbuilding	14 April 1983	23 June 1984	18 January 1986	30 August 2004	18 years, 225 days	n/a	Sunk as target 2006
Thomas S. Gates	CG-51	Bath Iron Works	31 August 1984	14 December 1985	22 August 1987	16 December 2005	18 years, 116 days	n/a	Scrapped 2017
Mark 41 Vertical Launch System (VLS) Variant
Bunker Hill	CG-52	Ingalls Shipbuilding	11 January 1984	11 March 1985	20 September 1986	22 September 2023	37 years, 2 days	Bremerton, WA	Decommissioned, sent to Reserve Fleet
Mobile Bay	CG-53	Ingalls Shipbuilding	6 June 1984	22 August 1985	21 February 1987	10 August 2023	36 years, 179 days	n/a	Sunk as target 2026
Antietam	CG-54	Ingalls Shipbuilding	15 November 1984	14 February 1986	6 June 1987	27 September 2024	37 years, 113 days	Pearl Harbor, HI	Decommissioned, sent to Reserve Fleet
Leyte Gulf	CG-55	Ingalls Shipbuilding	18 March 1985	20 June 1986	26 September 1987	20 September 2024	36 years, 360 days	Philadelphia, PA (formerly Norfolk)	Decommissioned, sent to Reserve Fleet
San Jacinto	CG-56	Ingalls Shipbuilding	24 July 1985	14 November 1986	23 January 1988	15 September 2023	35 years, 235 days	Philadelphia, PA	Decommissioned, sent to Reserve Fleet
Lake Champlain	CG-57	Ingalls Shipbuilding	3 March 1986	3 April 1987	12 August 1988	1 September 2023	35 years, 20 days	Bremerton, WA	Decommissioned, sent to Reserve Fleet
Philippine Sea	CG-58	Bath Iron Works	8 April 1986	12 July 1987	18 March 1989	25 September 2025	36 years, 191 days	Philadelphia, PA	Decommissioned, sent to Reserve Fleet
Princeton	CG-59	Ingalls Shipbuilding	15 October 1986	2 October 1987	11 February 1989			San Diego, CA	In active service
Normandy	CG-60	Bath Iron Works	7 April 1987	19 March 1988	9 December 1989	25 September 2025	35 years, 290 days	Philadelphia, PA (formerly Norfolk)	Decommissioned, sent to Reserve Fleet
Monterey	CG-61	Bath Iron Works	19 August 1987	23 October 1988	16 June 1990	16 September 2022	32 years, 92 days	Philadelphia, PA (formerly Norfolk)	Decommissioned, sent to Reserve Fleet
Robert Smalls	CG-62	Ingalls Shipbuilding	24 June 1987	15 July 1988	4 November 1989			San Diego, CA	In active service, formerly USS Chancellorsville
Cowpens	CG-63	Bath Iron Works	23 December 1987	11 March 1989	9 March 1991	27 August 2024	33 years, 171 days	Pearl Harbor, HI	Decommissioned, sent to Reserve Fleet
Gettysburg	CG-64	Bath Iron Works	17 August 1988	22 July 1989	22 June 1991			Norfolk, VA	In active service
Chosin	CG-65	Ingalls Shipbuilding	22 July 1988	1 September 1989	12 January 1991			San Diego, CA	In active service
Hué City	CG-66	Ingalls Shipbuilding	20 February 1989	1 June 1990	14 September 1991	23 September 2022	31 years, 9 days	Philadelphia, PA	Decommissioned, sent to Reserve Fleet
Shiloh	CG-67	Bath Iron Works	1 August 1989	8 September 1990	18 July 1992	30 September 2026	34 years, 74 days	Pearl Harbor, HI	Decommissioned, sent to Reserve Fleet
Anzio	CG-68	Ingalls Shipbuilding	21 August 1989	2 November 1990	2 May 1992	22 September 2022	30 years, 143 days	Philadelphia, PA	Decommissioned, sent to Reserve Fleet
Vicksburg	CG-69	Ingalls Shipbuilding	30 May 1990	2 August 1991	14 November 1992	28 June 2024	31 years, 227 days	n/a	Decommissioned, sold for scrap 2026
Lake Erie	CG-70	Bath Iron Works	6 March 1990	13 July 1991	10 May 1993	25 September 2026	33 years, 138 days	San Diego, CA	Decommissioned, sent to Reserve Fleet
Cape St. George	CG-71	Ingalls Shipbuilding	19 November 1990	10 January 1992	12 June 1993			San Diego, CA	In active service
Vella Gulf	CG-72	Ingalls Shipbuilding	22 April 1991	13 June 1992	18 September 1993	4 August 2022	28 years, 320 days	Philadelphia, PA	Decommissioned, sent to Reserve Fleet
Port Royal	CG-73	Ingalls Shipbuilding	18 October 1991	20 November 1992	9 July 1994	29 September 2022	28 years, 82 days	Pearl Harbor, HI	Decommissioned, sent to Reserve Fleet
Name	Hull no.	Builder	Laid down	Launched	Commissioned	Decommissioned	Service life	Homeport	Status

=== Status summary ===
Status	Count
Active, in commission	5
Decommissioned, sent to Reserve Fleet	15
Decommissioned, to be disposed	1
Disposed of by scrapping or sunk	6
Total	27

== See also ==
- List of cruiser classes in service

Equivalent cruisers of the same era

- Slava class
