= AN/SQQ-89 =

American naval anti-submarine warfare system

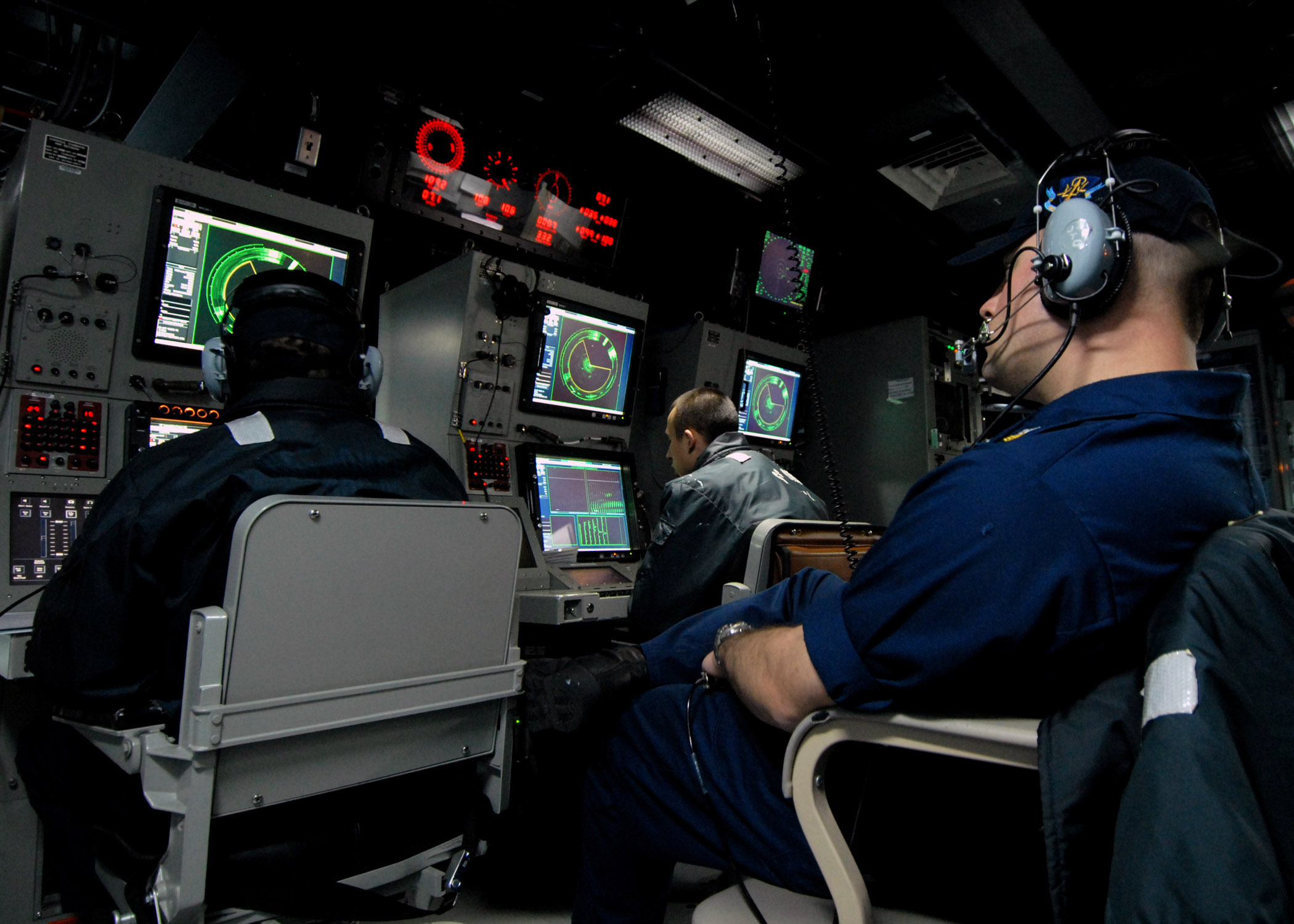
System consoles of AN/SQQ-89(V)15 onboard of USS Momsen

The AN/SQQ-89 Undersea Warfare Combat System is a naval anti-submarine warfare (ASW) system for surface warships developed by Lockheed Martin for the United States Navy. The system presents an integrated picture of the tactical situation by receiving, combining and processing active and passive sensor data from the hull-mounted array, towed array and sonobuoys. AN/SQQ-89 is integrated with the AEGIS combat system and provides a full range of undersea warfare (USW) functions including active and passive sensors, underwater fire control, onboard trainer and a highly evolved display subsystem. It provides detection, classification, and targeting capability to the following platforms:

- Ticonderoga-class cruiser
- Arleigh Burke-class destroyer

In accordance with the Joint Electronics Type Designation System (JETDS), the "AN/SQQ-89" designation represents the 89th design of an Army-Navy electronic device for surface ship special combination sonar system. The JETDS system also now is used to name all Department of Defense electronic systems.

== See also ==
- List of military electronics of the United States
