= Strike cruiser =

1970s proposed class of cruisers

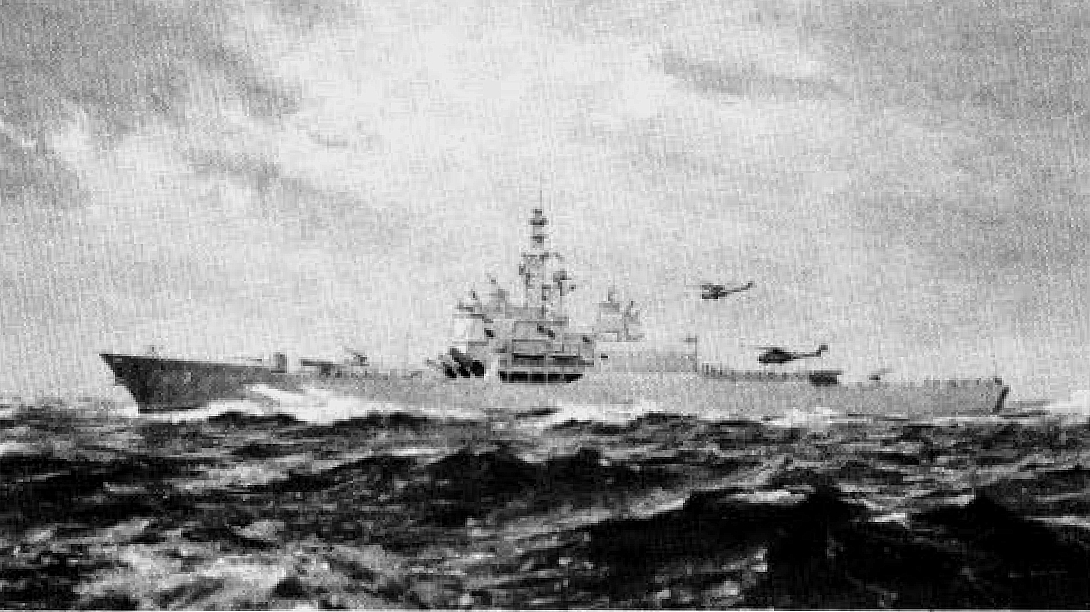
- Artist conception of Mark I variant (1976 version)

Class overview
- Name: Nuclear-powered guided missile strike cruiser (CSGN)
- Builders: Never built
- Operators: United States Navy
- Preceded by: Virginia class
- Succeeded by: Ticonderoga class
- Cost: $1.371 billion USD - lead ship (est.)
- Planned: 8–12

General characteristics
- Type: Guided-missile cruiser
- Displacement: 16,035 long tons (16,292 t) (light); 17,284 long tons (17,561 t)(full load)
- Length: 709 ft 7 in (216.28 m)
- Beam: 76 ft 5 in (23.29 m)
- Draft: 22 ft 4 in (6.81 m)
- Propulsion: 2 pressurized water D2G General Electric nuclear reactors, two shafts, 60,000 shp (45 MW); 2 × 2,000 kW (2,700 hp) diesel generators; 6 × ship service turbo generators
- Speed: 30 knots (56 km/h)+
- Range: unlimited
- Complement: 454 (total)
- Sensors & processing systems: AN/SPY-1A multi-function radar; AN/SPS-49 air search radar; AN/SPS-10F surface search radar; AN/SPS-64 navigation radar; AN/SPG-62 (x4) fire control radar; AN/SQS-53 bow-mounted sonar; AN/SLQ-32 ECM suite; AN/UYK-7 computer processing
- Armament: 2 × Mk-26 missile launchers; RIM-66 Standard and ASROC; 64 missiles forward; 64 missiles aft; 2 × quad Mk-143 ABL launchers; BGM-109 Tomahawk (8); 4 × quad Mk-141 tube launchers; RGM-84 Harpoon (16); 1 × 8"/55 cal MCLWG (forward); 2 × Mk-15 Phalanx CIWS (amidships); 2 × triple Mark 32 SVTT; Mark 46 torpedo
- Aircraft carried: 2 x SH-2F LAMPS I helicopters

The strike cruiser (proposed hull designator: CSGN) was a proposal from DARPA for a class of cruisers in the late 1970s. The proposal was for the strike cruiser to be a guided missile attack cruiser with a displacement of around 17,200 long tons (17,500 t), armed and equipped with the Aegis combat system, the SM-2, Harpoon anti-ship missile, the Tomahawk missile, and the Mk71 8-inch gun.

Line drawing of the strike cruiser

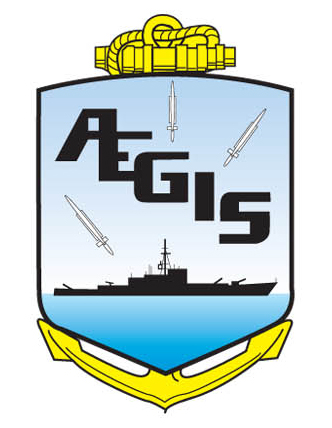
Aegis Combat System program office insignia

A prototype strike cruiser was to be the refurbished USS Long Beach at a cost of roughly $800 million, considered because she already carried phased array radars in her SCANFAR system; however, this never came to pass, as the conversion would need to be extensive, stripping the ship down to its hull.

Originally, eight to twelve strike cruisers were projected. The class would have been complemented by the Aegis-equipped fleet defense (DDG-47) version of the Spruance-class destroyer, under Elmo Zumwalt's "High-Low" fleet plan. Plagued with design difficulties and escalating cost, the project was canceled in the closing days of the Ford administration, with only design studies and seaworthiness experiments being finished. After the cancellation of the class, the Aegis destroyers were expanded into the Ticonderoga class (CG-47) Aegis cruiser program. An intermediate-size design based on the Virginia class was briefly considered, but also rejected.

The design of the Strike Cruiser can to this day be seen on the official Aegis Combat System program office insignia, as the system was initially designed for it.

== See also ==
- Arsenal ship
- DD21
- CG(X)
- Virginia-class cruiser (CGN-42 variant)
- Ticonderoga-class cruiser
- Kirov-class battlecruiser
- Cruiser Baseline
- List of cruisers of the United States Navy
