= Chernyak =

Chernyak, Czerniak, Czarniak, Cherniak or Cherniack is a gender-neutral Slavic surname. It is derived from čьrnъ ("black").

Czerniak and Czarniak are the Polish variants, with Czerniak being about six times more common.

Language	Masculine	Feminine
Belarusian	Чарняк (Čarniak, Charniak, Charnyak)	
Polish	Czerniak ([ˈt͡ʂɛrnjak]); Czarniak ([ˈt͡ʂarnjak])	
Russian (Romanization)	Черняк (Chernyak, Cherniak, Černiak)	
Slovak	Černák	Černáková
Ukrainian (Romanization)	Черняк (Chernyak, Cherniak, Černiak)	
Other	Čerňák, Černjak, Tcherniak, Tschernjak	

== People ==
- Alexey Chernyak (born 1973), Russian politician
- Andrzej Czarniak (1931–1985), Polish alpine skier
- Boris Cherniak (born 1964), Russian-born comedy hypnotist, motivational speaker, entertainer, author, illusionist and hypnotherapist
- Christopher Cherniak (born 1945), American philosophy academic
- Evgeniy Chernyak (born 1969), Ukrainian businessman
- Leah Cherniak (born 1956), Canadian playwright and theatre director
- Lindsay Czarniak (born 1977), American sports anchor and reporter
- Nathalie Sarraute (born Natalya Chernyak, 1900–1999), French lawyer and writer
- Saul Cherniack (1917–2018), Canadian lawyer and politician
- Volodymyr Chernyak (1941–2021), Ukrainian politician
- Włodzimierz Czarniak (1934–1964), Polish alpine skier
- Yan Chernyak (1909–1995), World War II Soviet spy
