= United States battleship retirement debate =

Debate over the effectiveness of naval gunfire support

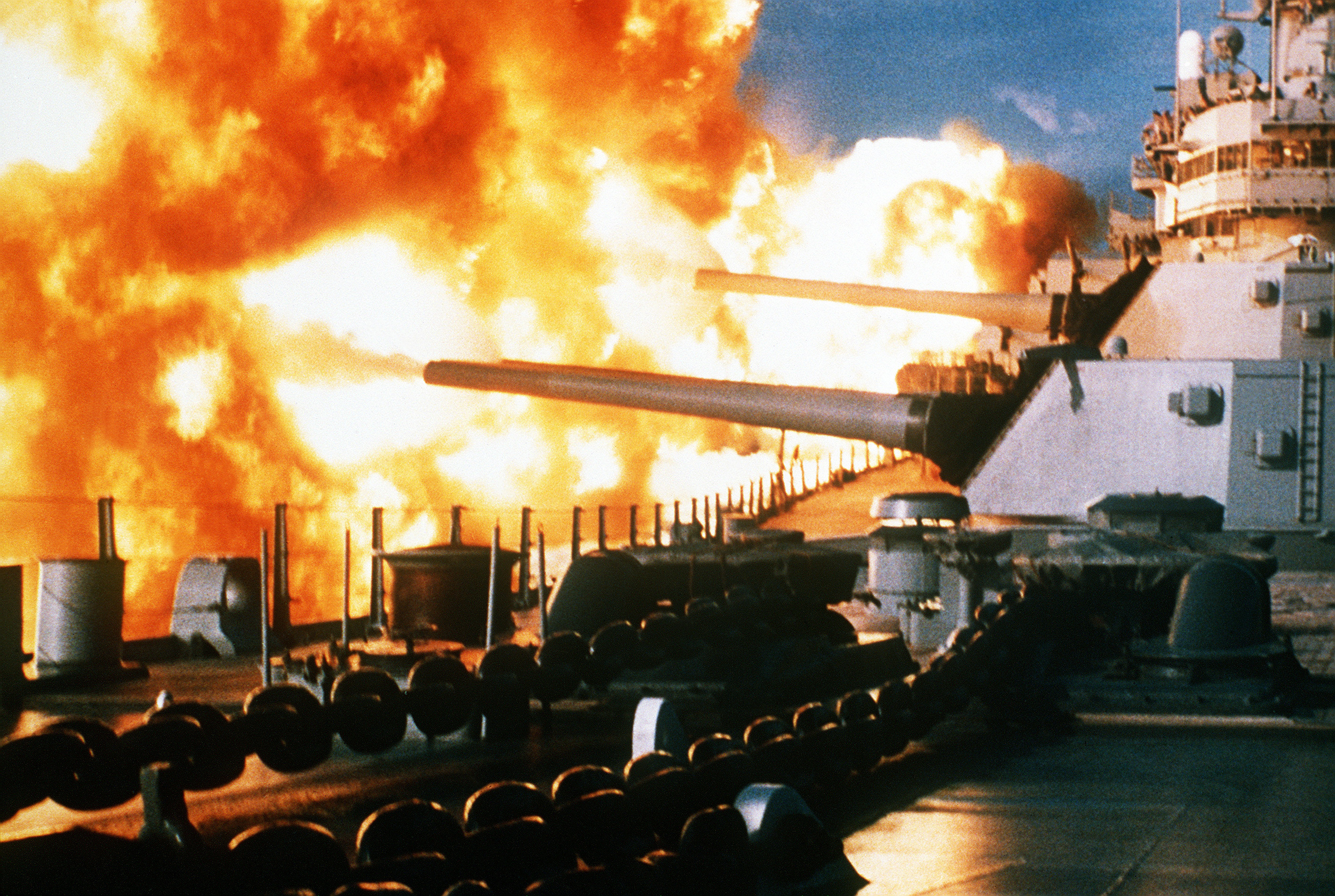
The battleship USS New Jersey fires at positions near Beirut on 9 January 1984 during the Lebanese Civil War.

The United States battleship retirement debate was a debate among the United States Navy, Marine Corps, Congress, and independent groups over the effectiveness of naval gunfire support (NGFS) provided by Iowa-class battleships, and whether an alternative should be implemented. The debate centered on the best way to provide fire support for amphibious assault and other troops near a shoreline.

The debate at large traced its roots back to the end of World War II, but this round of the debate began in 1992 with the decommissioning of the last active battleship, USS Missouri (BB-63), and ended when the last of these ships was finally completely retired in 2011. The Navy decommissioned Missouri after determining that her fire support function could be replaced by ship and submarine-launched missiles and aircraft-launched precision guided munitions. Many still viewed the battleships as essential for gunfire support, and questioned the Navy's decision. Congress required the Navy to retain at least two of the four remaining battleships on the Naval Vessel Register (NVR) instead of disposing of them.

The debate played out across a wide spectrum of media, including newspapers, magazines, web blogs, and congressional research arms including the Government Accountability Office. Many participants favored the continuation of the Zumwalt class or the reinstatement of the Iowa-class battleships to the NVR. The Iowa-class battleships and the Arleigh Burke– and Zumwalt-class destroyers all entered the debate as options put forward for naval gunfire support, while others advocated the use of specifically designed close air support planes and newer missile systems which can loiter in an area as a replacement for naval gunfire.

The debate about retention of the battleships became completely academic in 2011 when the last battleship owned by the Navy, USS Iowa, was donated to a non-profit group to be used as a museum ship.

== Background ==
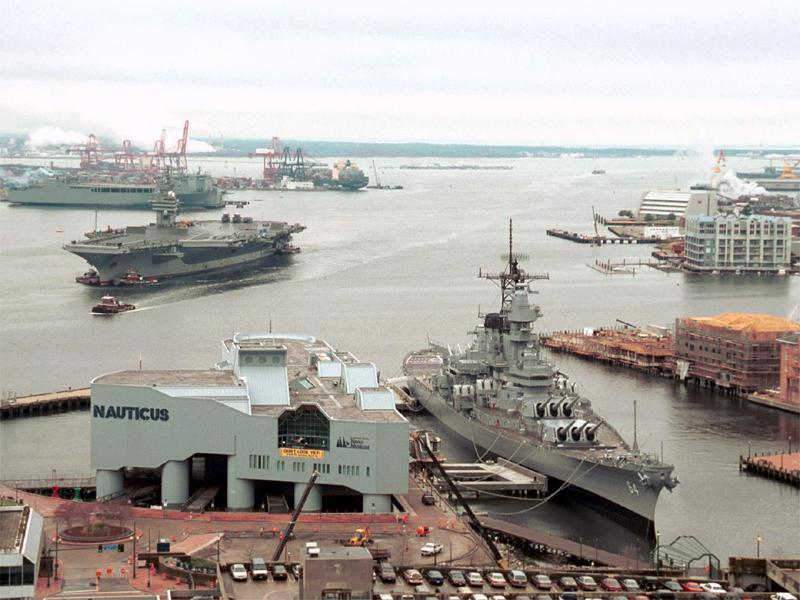
USS Wisconsin, shown moored in Norfolk, Virginia, is one of four Iowa-class battleships open to the public as museums, and was one of two maintained for potential reactivation until 2009.

By 1947, the United States had deactivated all of its remaining battleships (bar Missouri) and placed them in the United States Navy reserve fleets. By 1964, all but the four Iowa-class battleships had been stricken from the Naval Vessel Registry (NVR), but on several occasions one or more of those four battleships were reactivated to provide naval gunfire support. The U.S. Navy retained the four Iowa-class battleships long after other nations scrapped their big-gun fleets in favor of aircraft carriers and submarines. Congress was largely responsible for keeping the four Iowa-class battleships in the United States Navy reserve fleets and on the NVR as long as they did. The lawmakers argued that the battleships' large-caliber guns had a useful destructive power that was lacking in the smaller, cheaper, and faster guns mounted by U.S. cruisers and destroyers.

In the 1980s, President Ronald Reagan proposed creating a 600-ship navy as part of the overall defense department build-up to counter the threat of the armed forces of the Soviet Union; both the Soviet Army and Navy had grown in the aftermath of the unification of Vietnam in 1975 and the loss of faith that Americans had in their armed services. As part of this, all four Iowa-class battleships were modernized and reactivated. When the Soviet Union collapsed in 1991, the 600-ship navy was seen as unnecessary, and the navy made plans to return to its traditional 313-ship fleet. This led to the deactivation of many ships in the navy's fleet, including the four reactivated battleships; all were removed from service between 1990 and 1992. The navy struck all four ships and had made plans to donate them, but Congress intervened with the passing of the National Defense Authorization Act of 1996. Section 1011 required the United States Navy to reinstate to the Naval Vessel Register two of the Iowa-class battleships that had been struck by the navy in 1995; these ships were to be maintained in the United States Navy Reserve Fleets. The Navy was to ensure that both of the reinstated battleships were in good condition and could be reactivated for use in Marine Corps' amphibious operations. Both battleships were to be maintained with the reserve fleet until such a time as the navy could certify that it had within its fleet the operational capacity to meet or exceed the gunfire support that both battleships could provide. To comply with this requirement, the navy selected the battleships New Jersey and Wisconsin for reinstatement to the Naval Vessel Register.

== Replacing the battleships ==
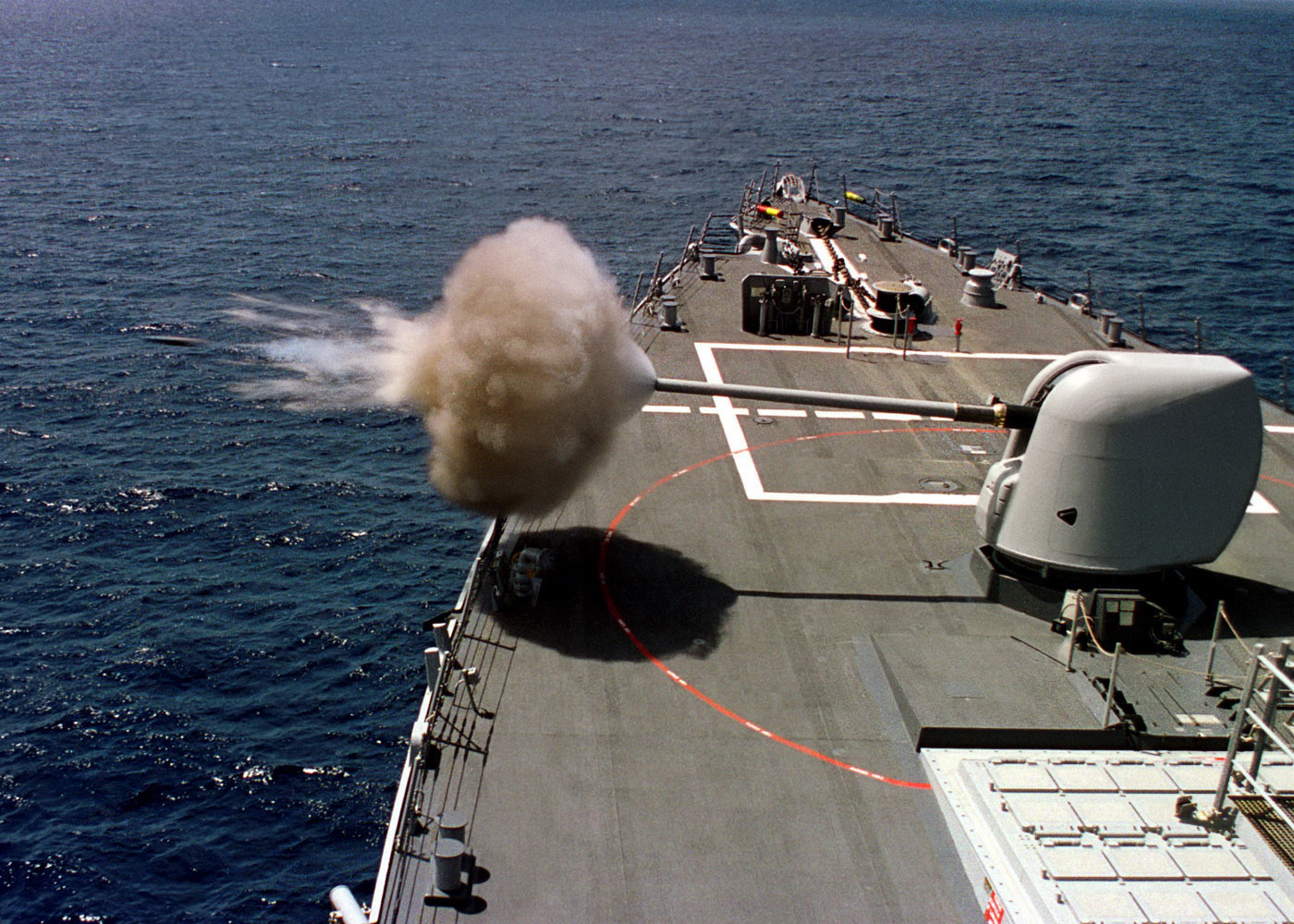
5-inch (127 mm) gun on an Arleigh Burke–class DDG

The Navy saw the battleships as prohibitively expensive, and worked to persuade Congress to allow it to remove Iowa and Wisconsin from the Naval Vessel Register by developing extended-range guided munitions and a new ship to fulfill Marine Corps requirements for naval gunfire support (NGFS).

The navy plan originally called for the extension of the range of the 5-inch (127 mm) gun on the Flight I Arleigh Burke-class guided missile destroyers with Extended Range Guided Munitions (ERGMs) that would enable the ships to fire precision guided projectiles about 40 nautical miles (70 km) inland. The ERGM program was initiated in 1996, but cancelled in 2008 due to rising cost and disappointing results. The similar Ballistic Trajectory Extended Range Munition (BTERM) program was also cancelled in 2008 for the same reasons. These weapons were not intended or expected to satisfy the full range of the Marine Corps requirements.

The Navy initiated the SC-21 program in 1994 to design and build a ship that could provide effective fire support. This evolved into the DD(X) program and eventually resulted in the Zumwalt-class destroyer program. The ship was to mount a pair of Advanced Gun Systems capable of firing specially designed Long Range Land Attack Projectiles some 60 miles (100 km) inland. Originally, the navy had planned to build a total of 32 of these destroyers, but the increasing cost of the program led the navy to reduce the overall number of destroyers from 32 to 24. In 2007 the total procurement of Zumwalt-class destroyers was further reduced to seven, before being discontinued at a total of three destroyers in July 2008 as a result of the high per-ship cost.

The discontinuation of the class was due in part to concerns that the Zumwalt-class ships would deprive other projects of needed funding, a concern that was raised by the Congressional Budget Office (CBO), Congressional Research Service (CRS), and the Government Accountability Office, all of which issued reports that suggested that total cost of each ship would be as high as $5 billion or more. In addition to the high cost, naval officials discussing the cancellation of the DD(X) program cited the inability of the DD(X) to fire the Standard missile or provide adequate air defense coverage, and a "classified threat" which the navy thought could be better handled by existing or new Arleigh Burke–class destroyers than by the Zumwalt-class destroyers. The article also reported that the Marine Corps no longer needed the long-range fire support from the Zumwalts' 155 mm Advanced Gun System because such fire support can be provided by much longer-ranged Tactical Tomahawk cruise missiles and precision airstrikes.

== Striking the Iowa-class battleships ==
"DDG 1000 Zumwalt is [...] being developed by the Navy to serve as the backbone of tomorrow's surface fleet. DDG 1000 Zumwalt provides a broad range of capabilities that are vital both to supporting the Global War on Terror and to fighting and winning major combatant operations. Zumwalt's multi-mission warfighting capabilities are designed to counter not only the threats of today, but threats projected over the next decade as well."

— Statement of the DD(X) program on the United States Navy's Program Executive Office, Ships

On 17 March 2006, while the ERGM and DD(X) programs were under development, the Secretary of the Navy exercised his authority to strike Iowa and Wisconsin from the Naval Vessel Register, which cleared the way for both ships to be donated for use as museum ships. The United States Navy and the United States Marine Corps had both certified that battleships would not be needed in any future war, and had turned their attention to completion of the next generation Zumwalt-class destroyers.

This move drew fire from sources familiar with the subject; among them were dissenting members of the United States Marine Corps. These dissenters argued that battleships were still a viable solution to naval gunfire support, including members of Congress who remained "deeply concerned" over the loss of naval surface gunfire support that the battleships provided, and a number of independent groups such as the United States' Naval Fire Support Association (USNFSA) whose ranks included former members of the armed service and fans of the battleships. Although the arguments presented from each group differed, they all agreed that the United States Navy had not in good faith considered the potential of reactivated battleships for use in the field, a position that was supported by a 1999 Government Accountability Office report regarding the United States Navy's gunfire support program.

"In summary, the committee is concerned that the Navy has foregone the long-range fire support capability of the battleship, has given little cause for optimism with respect to meeting near-term developmental objectives, and appears unrealistic in planning to support expeditionary warfare in the mid-term. The committee views the Navy's strategy for providing naval surface fire support as 'high risk,' and will continue to monitor progress accordingly."

— Evaluation of the United States Navy's naval surface fire support program in the National Defense Authorization Act of 2007

In response, the Navy pointed to the cost of reactivating the two Iowa-class battleships to their decommissioned capability. The Navy estimated costs in excess of $500 million, but this did not include an additional $110 million needed to replenish the gunpowder for the 16-inch (406 mm) guns, needed because a survey found the powder to be unsafe. In terms of schedule, the Navy's program management office estimated that reactivation would take 20 to 40 months, given the loss of corporate memory and the shipyard industrial base.

Reactivating the battleships would have required a wide range of battleship modernization improvements, according to the navy's program management office. At a minimum, these modernization improvements included command and control, communications, computers, and intelligence equipment; environmental protection (including ozone-depleting substances); a plastic-waste processor; pulper/shredder and wastewater alterations; firefighting/fire safety and women-at-sea alterations; a modernized sensor suite (air and surface search radar); and new combat and self-defense systems. The navy's program management office also identified other issues that would strongly discourage the Navy from reactivating and modernizing the battleships. For example, personnel needed to operate the battleships would have been extensive, and the skills needed might not have been available or easily reconstituted. Other issues included the age and unreliability of the battleships' propulsion systems and the fact that the navy no longer maintained the capability to manufacture their 16-inch gun system components and ordnance.

Although the navy firmly believed in the capabilities of the DD(X) destroyer program, members of the United States Congress remained skeptical about the efficiency of the new destroyers when compared to the battleships. Partially as a consequence, Congress passed Pub. L. 109–364, the National Defense Authorization Act 2007, requiring the battleships be kept and maintained in a state of readiness should they ever have been needed again. Congress ordered that the following measures be implemented to ensure that, if need be, Iowa and Wisconsin could be returned to active duty:

1. Iowa and Wisconsin must not be altered in any way that would impair their military utility;
2. The battleships must be preserved in their present condition through the continued use of cathodic protection, dehumidification systems, and any other preservation methods as needed;
3. Spare parts and unique equipment such as the 16-inch gun barrels and projectiles be preserved in adequate numbers to support Iowa and Wisconsin, if reactivated;
4. The navy must prepare plans for the rapid reactivation of Iowa and Wisconsin should they be returned to the navy in the event of a national emergency.

These four conditions closely mirrored the original three conditions that the Nation Defense Authorization Act of 1996 laid out for the maintenance of Iowa and Wisconsin while they were in the Mothball Fleet.

== Alternatives to battleship gunfire ==
During the period of time in which the battleships were out of commission in the United States, several technological updates and breakthroughs enabled naval ships, submarines, and aircraft to compensate for the absence of big guns within the fleet.

=== Air superiority ===
During World War II, aircraft were used with devastating effect for both strategic bombing and for close support of ground troops, by all combatants. Land-based aircraft were effective when the airfields were in range of the targets and when a degree of air superiority could be established. Carrier-based aircraft were originally intended for use against enemy ships. In addition to this role, several aircraft like the P-47 Thunderbolt were employed for close air support for ground based troops in Europe and in the Pacific.

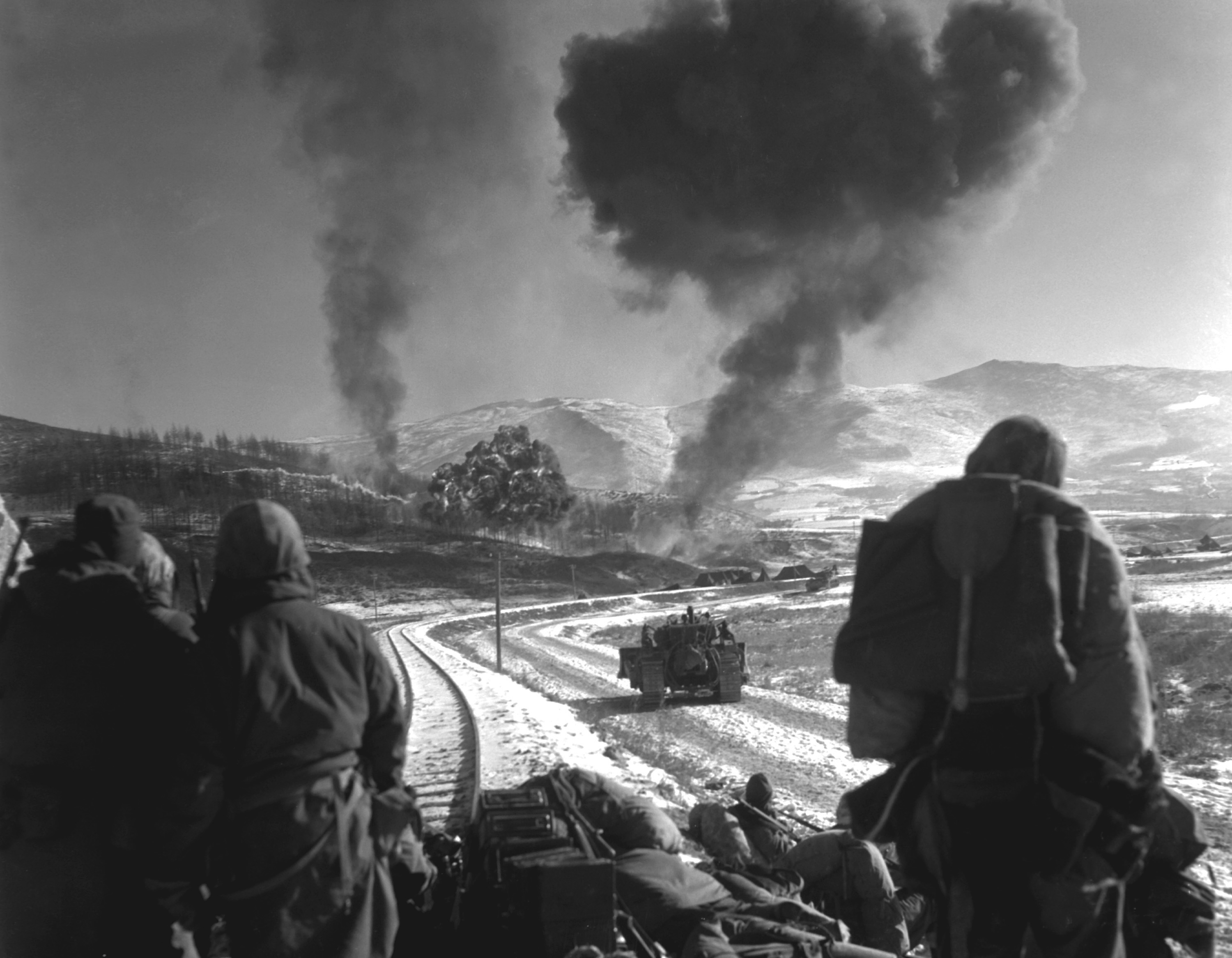
F4U-5 Corsairs provide close air support to U.S. Marines during the Battle of Chosin Reservoir, December 1950.

By the time of the Korean War, air power had been supplemented by the introduction of the jet engine, which allowed fighter and bomber aircraft to fly faster. As with their World War II predecessors, the newer jet aircraft proved capable of providing close air support for ground based troops, and were instrumental in aiding UN ground forces during the Battle of Chosin Reservoir.

The Vietnam War saw the introduction of helicopter gunships which could be employed to support ground based forces, and the experience gained in Vietnam would spawn the creation of several aircraft during and after the war designed specifically to aid ground forces, including the AC-47 Spooky, Fairchild AC-119, Lockheed AC-130, and A-10 Thunderbolt II, all of which are operated by the Air Force, and the F/A-18 Hornet which is operated by the Navy. In addition, the Army and Marine Corps operate UH-1 Iroquois, AH-1 Cobra, and AH-64 Apache helicopters for close air support, and these helicopters can be stationed onboard amphibious assault ships to provide ship-to-shore air support for ground forces. These aircraft would later prove instrumental in aiding ground forces from the 1980s onwards, and would be involved in the 1991 Gulf War, the 2001 invasion of Afghanistan, and the 2003 invasion of Iraq.

Starting after the invasion of Iraq, the air force began arming unmanned drone aircraft to perform strike missions. Originally designed for prolonged surveillance (and ironically to act as spotters for naval artillery), these aircraft typically have greater endurance than manned strike aircraft and some degree of automation to allow them to patrol for activity without requiring the constant attention of a pilot. This permitted the fielding of a less expensive aerial force which could maintain constant surveillance for enemy targets and conduct strikes on any targets encountered.

=== Missiles ===
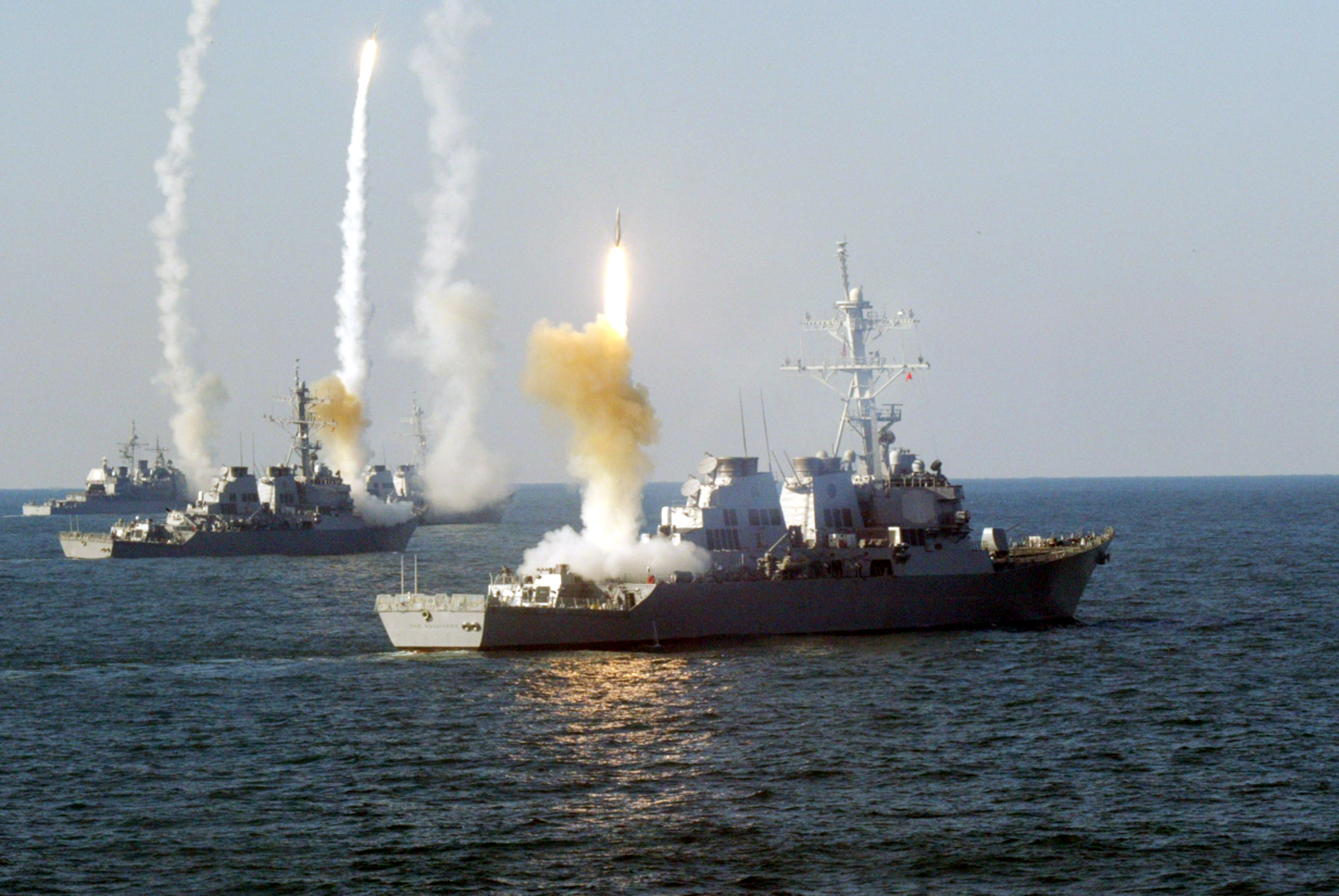
Arleigh Burke-class guided missile destroyers use their Vertical Launch Systems to fire Standard missiles during a live fire exercise.

The rise of precision strike munitions in the 1970s and 1980s reduced the need for a massive naval bombardment against an enemy force, as missiles could now be used against such targets to support ground forces and to destroy targets in advance of the arrival of troops. Guided missiles could also fire much further than any naval gun, allowing for strikes deep into the heart of enemy territory without risking the lives of pilots or airplanes. This led to a major shift in naval thinking, and as a result ships became more dependent on missile magazines than on their guns for offensive and defensive capabilities. This was demonstrated in the 1980s, when all four recommissioned battleships were outfitted with missile magazines, and again in the 1991 Gulf War, when both Missouri and Wisconsin launched missile volleys against targets in Iraq before using their guns against Iraqi targets on the coast. The same conflict saw the first use of submarine-launched cruise missiles when the Los Angeles-class attack submarine Louisville fired Tomahawk Land Attack Missiles into Iraq from the Red Sea.

Between 2002 and 2008, four of the Ohio-class submarines were converted to SSGNs carrying cruise missiles instead of SSBNs carrying ballistic missiles. Each SSGN carries 154 Tomahawk cruise missiles.

=== Gun support from other naval ships ===
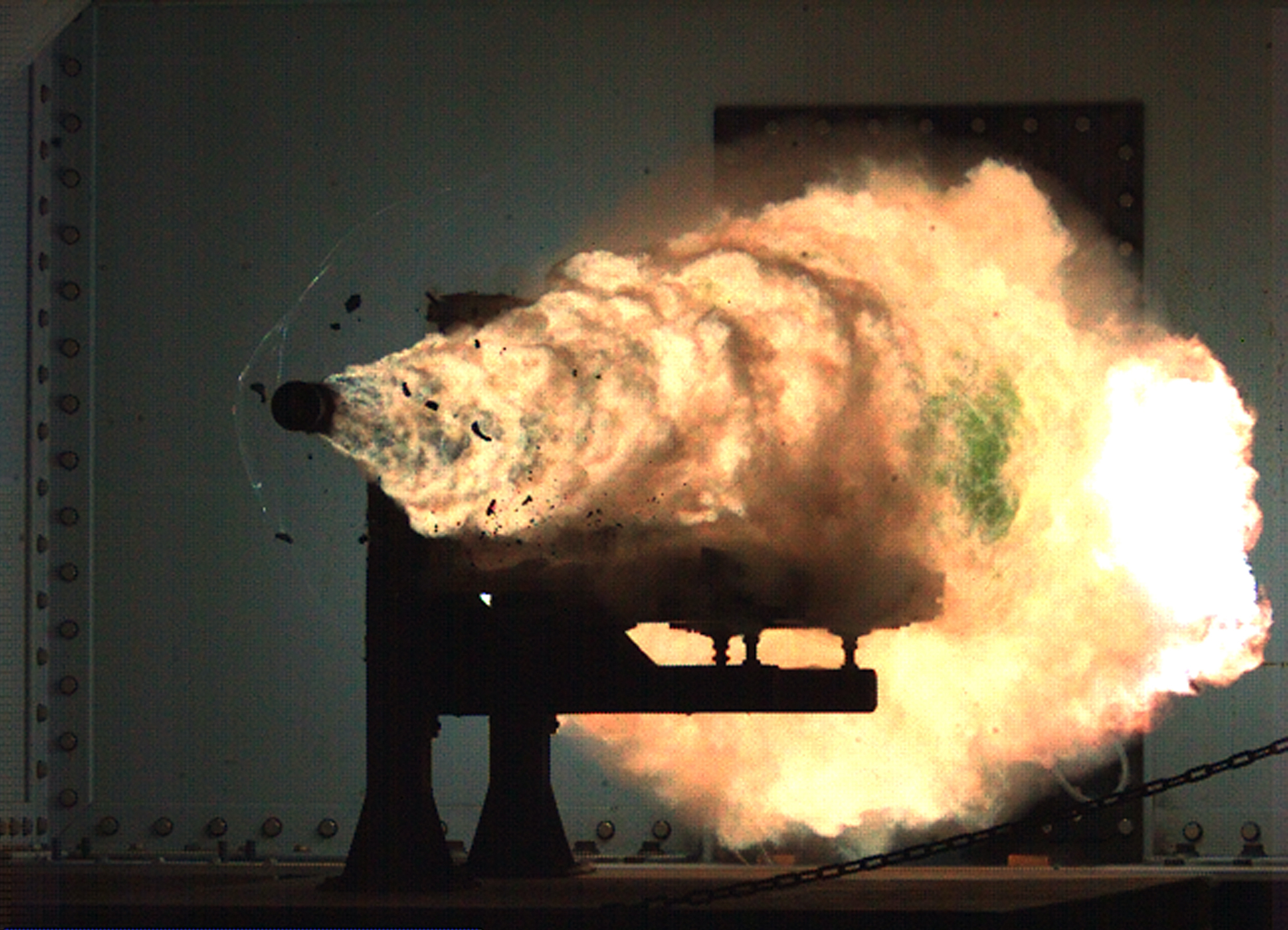
Test firing a railgun at the Naval Surface Warfare Center, January 2008

The Iowa-class battleships were maintained and used because their 16" Mark 7 guns were considered more effective than the smaller 5" Mark 45 guns found on modern frigates, destroyers, and cruisers. Each battleship had a main battery of nine 16" guns and a secondary battery of twenty 5" guns, while the smaller modern ships have a single 5" gun. The 5" gun was the largest gun remaining in active Navy service after the battleships were decommissioned.

In the 1960s, following a requirement established by Chief of Naval Operations (CNO) for a new gun capable of firing semi-active laser guided projectiles (SAL GP), the Naval Surface Warfare Center Dahlgren Division worked on the Major Caliber Lightweight Gun (MCLWG) program, testing capability of destroyer-sized ships to provide shore bombardment support with the range previously available from decommissioned cruisers. The 8"/55 caliber Mark 71 gun, a single gun version of the 8"/55 Mark 16 caliber gun was mounted aboard the USS Hull (DD-945). After at-sea technical evaluation in 1975 and operational testing that followed through 1976, The Operational Test and Evaluation Force determined inaccuracy made the gun operationally unsuitable. The lightweight 8"/55 was concluded to be no more effective than the 5"/54 with Rocket Assisted Projectiles. Program funding was terminated in 1978.

In the 1980s, conventional guns were used by US destroyers during the Lebanese Civil War to shell positions for the Multinational Force in Lebanon operating on the ground. Guns were also used by the Royal Navy in the Falklands War to support British forces during the operations to recapture the islands from the Argentinians. For example, the Type 42 destroyer HMS Cardiff was required to fire at enemy positions on the islands with her 4.5-inch gun. In one engagement she fired 277 high-explosive rounds, although later problems with the gun prevented continual use. Ship-based gunfire was also used during Operation Praying Mantis in 1988 to neutralize Iranian gun emplacements on oil platforms in the Persian Gulf. Although the smaller caliber guns are effective in combat, larger caliber guns can have a large psychological effect, as occurred during the bombardment of Iraqi shore defenses by the battleships Missouri and Wisconsin in the Gulf War. When the latter battleship returned to resume shelling the island, the enemy troops surrendered to her Pioneer UAV launched to spot for the battleships' guns rather than face another round of heavy naval artillery.

The navy looked into creating precision guided artillery rounds for use with the current fleet of cruisers and destroyers. The most recent attempt to modify the guns for longer range came with the Long Range Land Attack Projectile (LRLAP) munitions for the Advanced Gun System mounts installed aboard the Zumwalt-class destroyers. The navy was involved in the LRLAP and Ballistic Trajectory Extended Range Munition, both cancelled efforts to develop Extended Range Guided Munitions.

In addition to funding research into various extended range munitions, the Navy also began development on railguns for use with the fleet. The United States Naval Surface Warfare Center Dahlgren Division demonstrated an 8 MJ rail gun firing 3.2 kilogram (slightly more than 7 pounds) projectiles in October 2006 as a prototype of a 64 MJ weapon to be deployed aboard navy warships. The main problem the navy has had with implementing a railgun cannon system is that the guns wear out due to the immense heat produced by firing. Such weapons were expected to be powerful enough to do a little more damage than a BGM-109 Tomahawk missile at a fraction of the projectile cost. BAE Systems delivered a 32 MJ prototype to the Navy in 2007. On 31 January 2008, the US Navy tested a magnetic railgun; it fired a shell at 2520 m/s using 10.64 megajoules of energy. Its expected performance was over 5800 m/s muzzle velocity, accurate enough to hit a 5-meter target from 200 nmi (370 km) away while shooting at 10 shots per minute. For the 2022 fiscal year, the U.S. Navy did not request any funding for the railgun program, citing cost overruns, problems with integration into the surface fleet, and other issues. As of 2022 development has stopped.

Apart from railguns, 16-inch scramjet rounds with ranges of up to 400 nautical miles (740.8 kilometers) that have a 9-minute time of flight were proposed by Pratt and Whitney, working with Dr. Dennis Reilly, a plasma physicist with extensive experience with munitions, but the Navy had no interested sponsor.

== Subsequent developments ==
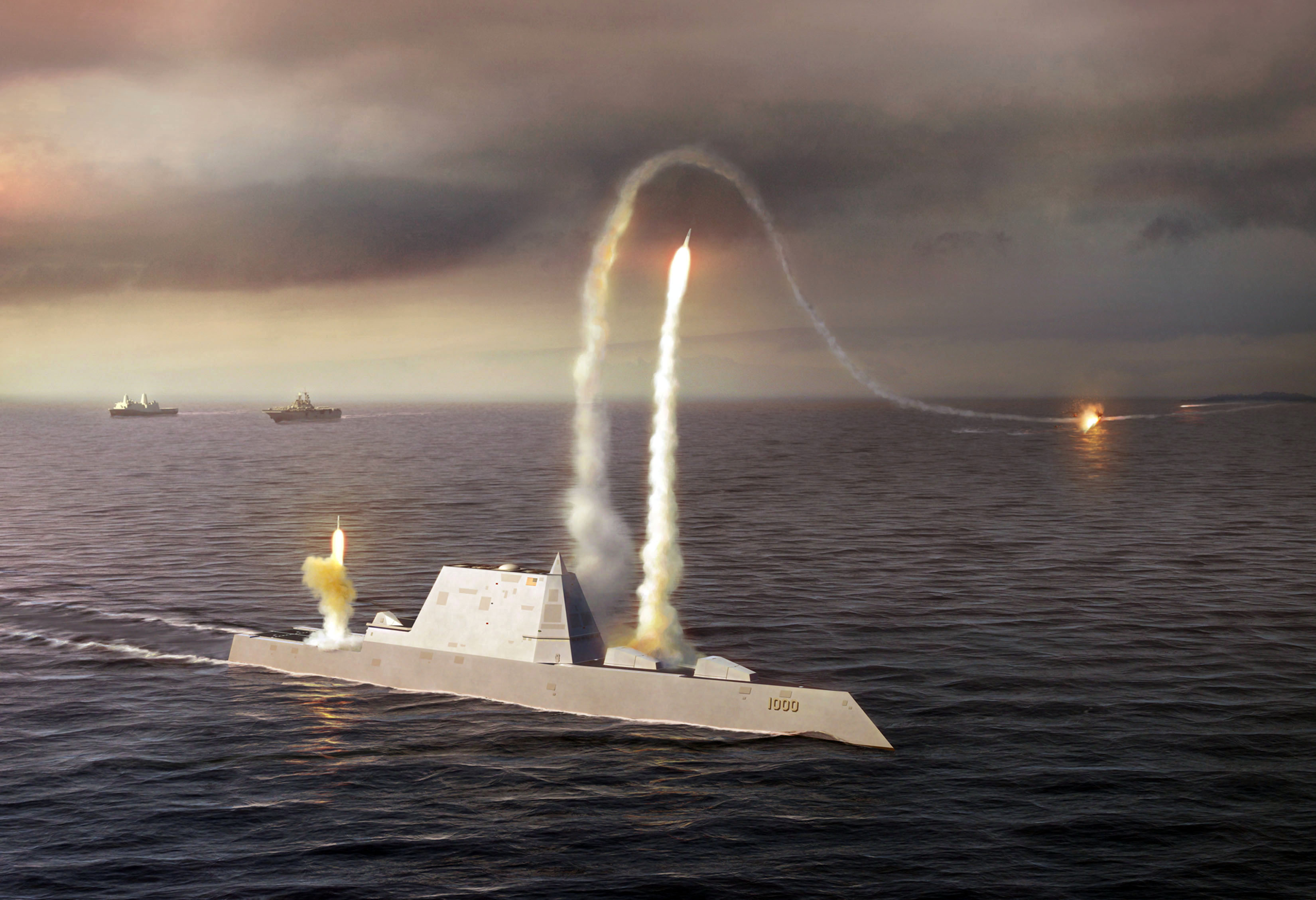
The Zumwalt-class destroyers were to replace battleship gunfire support.

New Jersey remained on the NVR until the Strom Thurmond National Defense Authorization Act of 1999 passed through Congress 18 October 1998. Section 1011 required the United States Secretary of the Navy to list and maintain Iowa and Wisconsin on the Naval Vessel Register, while Section 1012 required the Secretary of the Navy to strike New Jersey from the Naval Vessel Register and transfer the battleship to a not-for-profit entity in accordance with section 7306 of Title 10, United States Code. Section 1012 also required the transferee to locate the battleship in the State of New Jersey. The navy made the switch in January 1999. Iowa and Wisconsin were finally stricken from the Naval Vessel Register in 2006.

Prior to the reduction of ships in the Zumwalt program, it seemed unlikely that the above four conditions would have impeded the plan to turn Iowa and Wisconsin into museum ships because the navy had expected a sufficient number of Zumwalt destroyers to be ready to help fill the NGFS gap by 2018 at the earliest, but the July 2008 decision by the navy to cancel the Zumwalt program left the Navy without a ship class capable of replacing the two battleships removed from the Naval Vessel Register in March 2006. James T. Conway, Commandant of the Marine Corps has said that missiles fired from the littoral combat ship could fulfill the USMC needs for NGFS. This would not be the current NLOS-LS program as the range of the PAM missile at 22 miles (35 km) falls short of the threshold requirement for NGFS of 41 miles (66 km) and the number of CLUs the current LCS designs can carry in a ready to fire configuration is also short of the required volume of fire. The Loitering Attack Missile could have matched the required range, but it was cancelled in 2011 and the LCS would still have fallen short in terms of rounds ready to fire.

On 15 September 2015, presidential candidate Donald Trump, while giving a speech on defense during the campaign for the 2016 presidential election on board the battleship Iowa in San Pedro, California, briefly remarked in having interest in recommissioning the Iowa-class battleships.

After the completion of sea trials which began in 2014, Zumwalt was officially commissioned into the US Navy on 15 October 2016 at Baltimore, Maryland. However in November 2016, the principal and only ammunition for Zumwalt's two 155 mm Advanced Gun Systems, the Long Range Land Attack Projectile, was cancelled due to increased costs, so the guns have never been operational. Starting in 2023 the Navy will completely remove the AGS from the three Zumwalt-class ships and replace them with hypersonic missiles. Since December 2016, Zumwalt has been assigned to the US Pacific Fleet and is homeported in San Diego, California.
