= Gunshot =

Single discharge of a gun

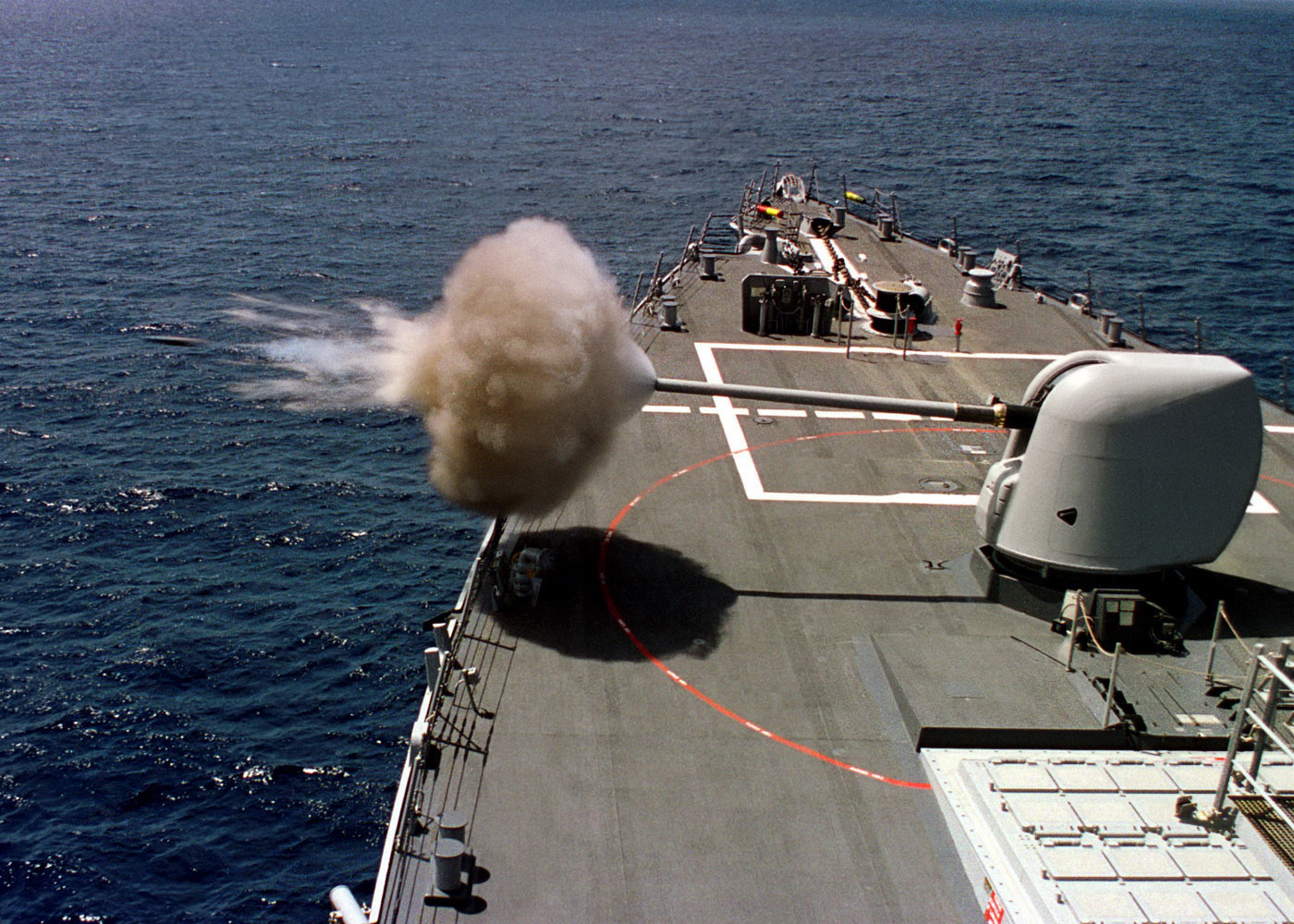
A gunshot from the Mark 45 gun

A gunshot is a single discharge of a gun, typically a man-portable firearm, producing a visible flash, a powerful and loud shockwave and often chemical gunshot residue. The term can also refer to a gunshot wound caused by such a discharge.

Multiple discharges of one or more firearms are referred to as gunfire. The word can connote either the sound of a gun firing, the projectiles that were fired, or both. For example, the statement "gunfire came from the next street" could either mean the sound of discharge, or it could mean the bullets that were discharged. It is better to be a bit more specific while writing however. "The sound of gunfire" or "we came under gunfire" would be more descriptive and prevent confusion. In the latter phrase, in particular, "fire" is used more (i.e. "under fire"), as both words hold the same general meaning within the proper context.

== Gunfire characteristics ==
There are three primary attributes that characterize gunfire and hence enable the detection and location of gunfire and similar weapon discharges:

1. A muzzle flash which occurs when superheated gases and incompletely combusted propellant residue are secondarily ignited upon contact with fresh ambient oxygen after being expelled out the gun barrel
2. A muzzle blast which occurs when high-pressure gases within the barrel are suddenly released and rapidly expand when the projectile exits the muzzle and the bullet-bore contact that maintained the seal is removed. A typical muzzle blast generates a shock wave with a sound pressure level (SPL) of 140 dB or louder.
3. A whip-like "snap" or "crack" caused by the sonic boom that occurs as a projectile moves through the air at supersonic speeds.

Gunfire can be confused with other noises that can sound similar, such as firework explosions and cars backfiring. Gunfire noise propagation is anisotropic. The sounds may be heard at greater distances in the direction of bullet travel than behind or beside the gun.

Urban areas typically exhibit diurnal noise patterns where background noise is higher during the daytime and lower at night and the noise floor directly correlates to urban activity (e.g., automobile traffic, airplane traffic, construction, and so on). A firearm's muzzle blast may be masked by ambient noise during the daytime, but may be detected at greater distances during the quieter hours of darkness. A popular urban gunfire locator system typically uses six to ten audio sensors per square mile for trilateration. (two or three per square kilometer)

A silencer can be attached to the muzzle of a firearm to decrease the auditory signature of the high-velocity gases released from the muzzle when firing the weapon. The sound of firing is only decreased, however, and is still considerable. Suppressors attached to the muzzle will not reduce the sound of high velocity gases released from other locations, such as the gap between the cylinder and barrel of a revolver. A muzzle suppressor is similarly ineffective in reducing the snap of a supersonic bullet or the noise produced by the mechanical action of a self-loading firearm. Use of suppressors is rare in United States crimes. A 2007 study estimated unlawful suppressor possession was involved in only 0.05 percent (1 in 2,000) federal criminal prosecutions; and the suppressor was unused, but simply in the possession of the defendant for 92% of prosecutions involving a suppressor.

== See also ==
- Gun violence
- Gunfight
- Gunshot residue
- Gunshot wound
- Hydrostatic shock
- Stopping power
- Terminal ballistics
- Warning shot
- Wound ballistics
