= Czarniak =

Czarniak is a Polish surname. Notable people with the surname include:

- Andrzej Czarniak
- Lindsay Czarniak
- Włodzimierz Czarniak (1934–1964), Polish alpine skier
