= Martin Fackler =

American Army officer, surgeon, and wound ballistics expert

Martin L. Fackler
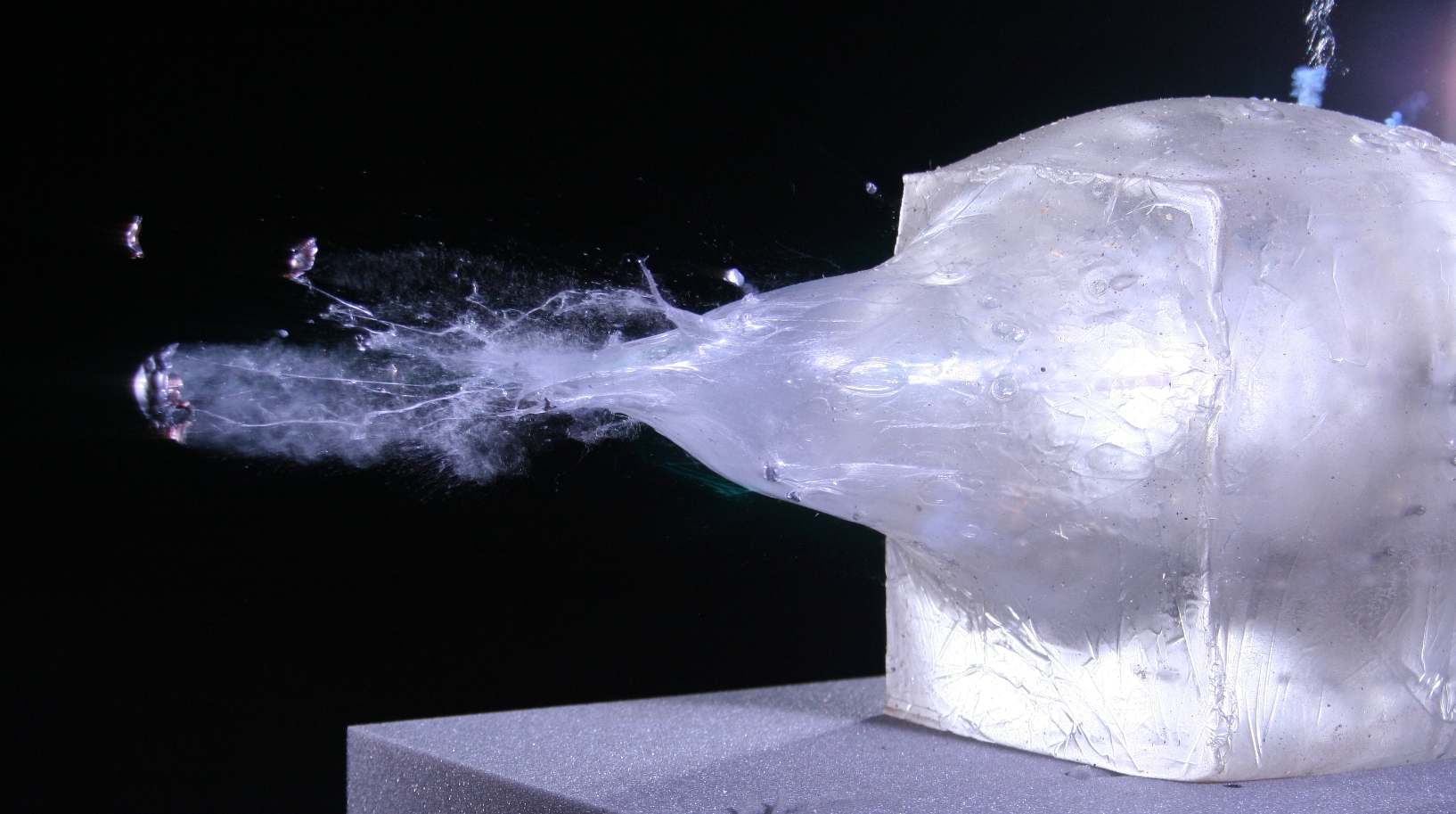
- High speed photo of 10% clear ballistic gelatin showing terminal fragmentation of a .243 projectile
- Born: April 8, 1933; York, Pennsylvania, U.S.
- Died: May 23, 2015 (aged 82); Gainesville, Florida, U.S.
- Occupations: retired Colonel United States Army, physician, surgeon and renowned specialist in wound ballistics
- Spouse: Sandra Fox Fackler

Martin L. Fackler (1933–2015) was an American military officer, surgeon and wound ballistics expert. He served in the U.S Navy from 1960 to 1975 and in the U.S. Army from 1975 to 1991. He was a field surgeon at the Naval Support Hospitals at Da Nang, Vietnam and at Yokosuka, Japan, and later a colonel in the US Army's Medical Corps. He was the founder and head of the Wound Ballistics Laboratory for the Letterman Army Institute of Research from 1981 to 1991. He was a member and leader of various organizations, among them the International Wound Ballistics Association, the French Wound Ballistics Society and the American Academy of Forensic Sciences. Fackler had numerous teaching appointments and was the author of over 300 publications in regards to wound ballistics, body armor, and treatment of injuries for both the military and civilian populations. He is credited with a number of contributions to the field of terminal ballistics, including:

- Developing and testing improved media in which the effects of bullet wounds could be simulated. This led to the widespread acceptance of 10% ballistic gelatin for evaluating penetration and expansion of projectiles.
- Establishing effects of projectile design and shape on wounding.
- He hypothesized that wound depth was much more important than previously thought, and recommended ammunition that could send a bullet at least twelve inches into his ballistic gelatin.
- He was the first researcher to demonstrate that fragmentation was the most effective means of inflicting wounds in a modern military rifle round. He asserted that the "permanent wound cavity" or actual damage caused by a projectile is the primary "stopping power" mechanism and that the "temporary wound cavity" or shock wave produced by the projectile is at best a secondary mechanism, if not irrelevant.

== Gallery ==
Examples of Fackler's work on behalf of the U.S. military:

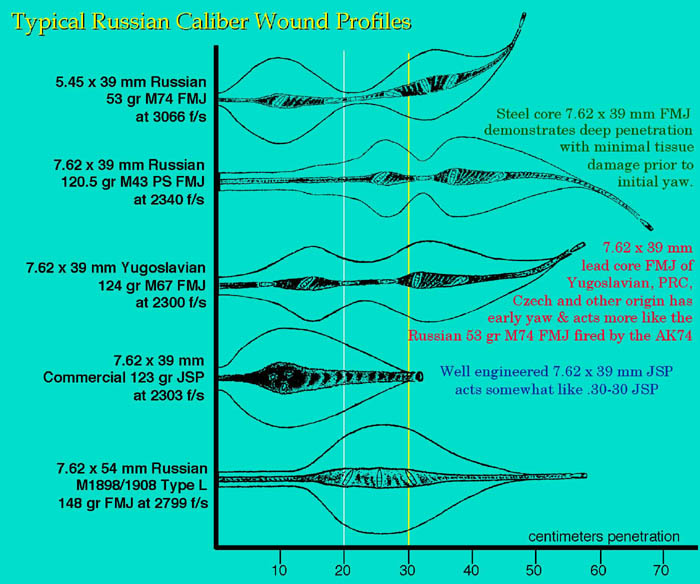
Wound ballistics for various Soviet cartridges

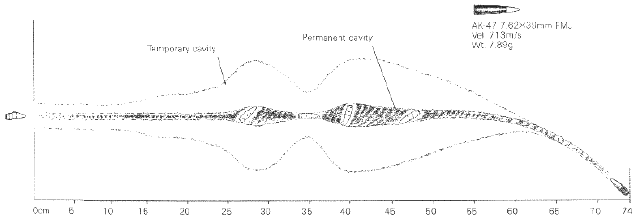
AK-47 7.62x39mm wound ballistics

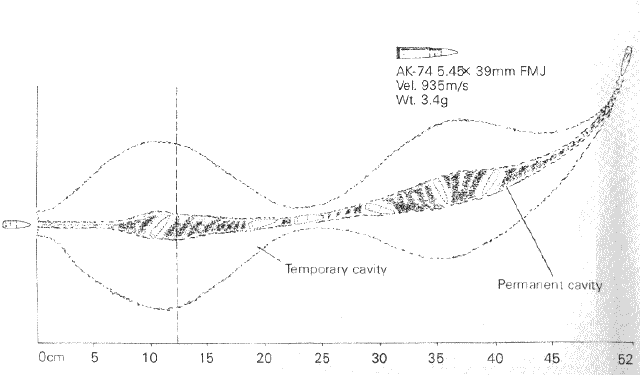
AK-74 5.45x39mm wound ballistics

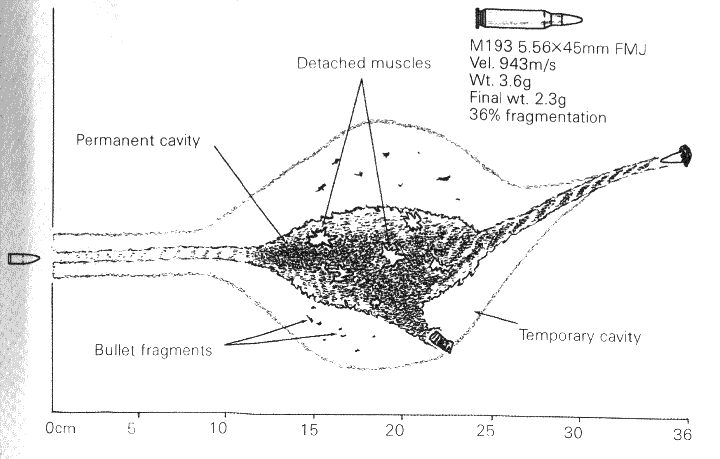
M16 M193 5.56x45mm wound ballistics

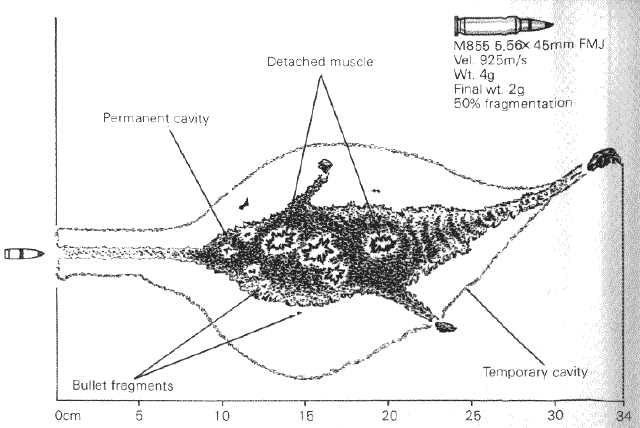
M16A2 M855 5.56X45mm NATO wound ballistics
