= Long Range Land Attack Projectile =

Cancelled American artillery shell

The Long Range Land Attack Projectile (LRLAP) is a canceled precision guided 155 mm (6.1 in) naval artillery shell for the U.S. Navy's Advanced Gun System (AGS). LRLAP was developed and produced by Lockheed Martin Missiles and Fire Control, the prime contractor being BAE Systems.

The LRLAP would have used a rocket-assisted projectile with fin glide trajectory. The warhead effectiveness was considered comparable to that of the M795 artillery shell, and with the AGS it would have been capable of 6 round Multiple Rounds Simultaneous Impact (MRSI) in a span of 2 seconds. It would have used a blast fragmentation type warhead.

The LRLAP was designed for use in the AGS and is not compatible with any other weapon. The AGS is used only on the Zumwalt-class destroyer, with two AGSs on each ship. In November 2016, the Navy announced it had decided to cancel procurement of the LRLAP. This was due to rising costs resulting from the trimming of the Zumwalt-class destroyer fleet to just three ships, raising individual shell cost to $800,000-$1 million, about as much as a Tomahawk cruise missile. About 90 rounds had been secured for testing aboard the three hulls, but a full buy of about 2,000 planned rounds would be about $1.8-$2 billion.

== Specifications ==
- Caliber: 155 mm (6.1 in)
- Weight:
  - Total: 102 kg (225 lb)
  - Bursting charge: 11 kg (24 lb)
- Length (propellant and projectile): 220 cm (88 in)
- Guidance: GPS/INS
- Precision: Circular error probable of 50 m (160 ft) or less
- Range: 100 nautical miles (190 km) max. (Some sources report 83 nautical miles (150 km), or 74 nautical miles (140 km).
- Warhead: Unitary high-explosive
- Cost:

- 2004 Manufacturer's estimated per-unit cost at full production: $35,000
- 150 LRLAP guided projectiles were procured in FY2015 with a unit cost of $476,946.67
- unit cost in 2016: $800,000 to $1,000,000

== Program history ==
- June 2005 - Successful guided flight test of the LRLAP sets gun-launched guided projectile range record of 59 nautical miles (109 km).
- September 2010 - Successful unguided flight test.
- August 2011 - Two live fire tests of 45 nautical miles range.
- June 2013 - Four full cycle live fire tests conducted.
- September 2013 - Lockheed receives $18 million contract to transition the LRLAP to production. Fielding planned for 2016.
- November 2016 - USN moves to cancel LRLAP projectiles citing excessive costs.

== 127 mm (5-inch) version ==
In cooperation with BAE Systems a version of LRLAP was designed to be used with the 127 mm 5"/54 caliber Mark 45 guns used on most Navy ships. It was never produced. Other guided munitions for these guns were BTERM and ERGM, which were also never produced.

=== Specifications ===
- Caliber: 127 mm (5.0 in)
- Guidance: GPS/INS
- Range: 53 nautical miles (100 km) max
- Warhead: Unitary high-explosive

== See also ==
- Extended Range Guided Munition
- Ballistic Trajectory Extended Range Munition
