= Hydrostatic shock =

Controversial theory in terminal ballistics

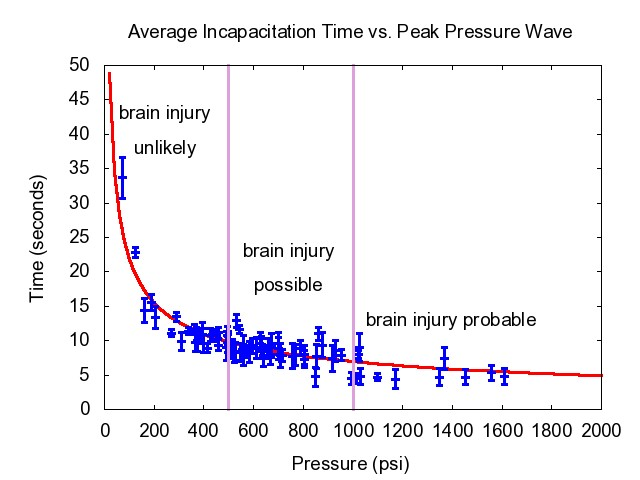
Average time until incapacitation decreases rapidly with pressure wave magnitude as magnitudes approach 500 psi (3,400 kPa). See: Links between traumatic brain injury and ballistic pressure waves originating in the thoracic cavity and extremities. Brain Injury 21(7): 657–662, 2007.

Hydrostatic shock, also known as hydro-shock, is the controversial concept that a penetrating projectile (such as a bullet) can produce a pressure wave that causes "remote neural damage", "subtle damage in neural tissues" and "rapid effects" in living targets. It has also been suggested that pressure wave effects can cause indirect bone fractures at a distance from the projectile path, although it was later demonstrated that indirect bone fractures are caused by temporary cavity effects (strain placed on the bone by the radial tissue displacement produced by the temporary cavity formation).

Proponents of the concept argue that hydrostatic shock can produce remote neural damage and produce incapacitation more quickly than blood loss effects. In arguments about the differences in stopping power between calibers and between cartridge models, proponents of cartridges that are "light and fast" (such as the 9×19mm Parabellum) versus cartridges that are "slow and heavy" (such as the .45 ACP) often refer to this phenomenon.

Martin Fackler has argued that sonic pressure waves do not cause tissue disruption and that temporary cavity formation is the actual cause of tissue disruption mistakenly ascribed to sonic pressure waves. One review noted that strong opinion divided papers on whether the pressure wave contributes to wound injury. It ultimately concluded that no "conclusive evidence could be found for permanent pathological effects produced by the pressure wave".

== Origin of the hypothesis ==
An early mention of "hydrostatic shock" appeared in Popular Mechanics in April 1942. In the scientific literature, the first discussion of pressure waves created when a bullet hits a living target is presented by E. Harvey Newton and his research group at Princeton University in 1947:

It is generally recognized that when a high-velocity missile strikes the body and moves through soft tissues, pressures develop which are measured in thousands of atmospheres. Actually, three different types of pressure change appear: (1) shock wave pressures or sharp, high-pressure pulses, formed when the missile hits the body surface; (2) very high-pressure regions immediately in front and to each side of the moving missile; (3) relatively slow, low-pressure changes connected with the behavior of the large explosive temporary cavity, formed behind the missile. Such pressure changes appear to be responsible for what is known to hunters as hydraulic shock—a hydraulic transmission of energy that is believed to cause instant death of animals hit by high-velocity bullets (Powell (1)).

— An Experimental Study of shock waves resulting from the impact of high-velocity missiles on animal tissues

Frank Chamberlin, a World War II trauma surgeon and ballistics researcher, noted remote pressure wave effects. Col. Chamberlin described what he called "explosive effects" and "hydraulic reaction" of bullets in tissue. ...liquids are put in motion by 'shock waves' or hydraulic effects... with liquid filled tissues, the effects and destruction of tissues extend in all directions far beyond the wound axis. He avoided the ambiguous use of the term "shock" because it can refer to either a specific kind of pressure wave associated with explosions and supersonic projectiles or to a medical condition in the body.

Col. Chamberlin recognized that many theories have been advanced in wound ballistics. During World War II he commanded an 8,500-bed hospital center that treated over 67,000 patients during the fourteen months that he operated it. P.O. Ackley estimates that 85% of the patients were suffering from gunshot wounds. Col. Chamberlin spent many hours interviewing patients as to their reactions to bullet wounds. He conducted many live animal experiments after his tour of duty. On the subject of wound ballistics theories, he wrote:

If I had to pick one of these theories as gospel, I'd still go along with the Hydraulic Reaction of the Body Fluids plus the reactions on the Central Nervous System.

— Col. Frank Chamberlin, M.D.

Other World War II era scientists noted remote pressure wave effects in the peripheral nerves. There was support for the idea of remote neural effects of ballistic pressure waves in the medical and scientific communities, but the phrase "hydrostatic shock" and similar phrases including "shock" were used mainly by gunwriters (such as Jack O'Conner) and the small arms industry (such as Roy Weatherby, and Federal "Hydra-Shok.")

== Arguments against ==
Martin Fackler, a Vietnam-era trauma surgeon, wound ballistics researcher, a colonel in the U.S. Army and the head of the Wound Ballistics Laboratory for the U.S. Army's Medical Training Center, Letterman Institute, claimed that hydrostatic shock had been disproved and that the assertion that a pressure wave plays a role in injury or incapacitation is a myth. Others expressed similar views.

Fackler based his argument on the lithotriptor, a tool commonly used to break up kidney stones. A lithotriptor uses sonic pressure waves which are stronger than those caused by most handgun bullets, yet it produces no damage to soft tissues whatsoever. Hence, Fackler argued, ballistic pressure waves cannot damage tissue either.

Fackler claimed that a study of rifle bullet wounds in Vietnam (Wound Data and Munitions Effectiveness Team) found "no cases of bones being broken, or major vessels torn, that were not hit by the penetrating bullet. In only two cases, an organ that was not hit (but was within a few cm of the projectile path), suffered some disruption." Fackler cited a personal communication with R. F. Bellamy. However, Bellamy's published findings the following year estimated that 10% of fractures in the data set might be due to indirect injuries, and one specific case is described in detail (pp. 153–154). In addition, the published analysis documents five instances of abdominal wounding in cases where the bullet did not penetrate the abdominal cavity (pp. 149–152), a case of lung contusion resulting from a hit to the shoulder (pp. 146–149), and a case of indirect effects on the central nervous system (p. 155). Fackler's critics argue that his evidence does not contradict distant injuries, as Fackler claimed, but the WDMET data from Vietnam actually provides supporting evidence for it.

A summary of the debate was published in 2009 as part of a Historical Overview of Wound Ballistics Research.

Fackler [10, 13] however, disputed the shock wave hypothesis, claiming there is no physical evidence to support it, although some support for this hypothesis had already been provided by Harvey [20, 21], Kolsky [31], Suneson et al. [42, 43], and Crucq [5]. Since that time, other authors suggest there is increasing evidence to support the hypothesis that shock waves from high velocity bullets can cause tissue related damage and damage to the nervous system. This has been shown in various experiments using simulant models [24, 48]. One of the most interesting is a study by Courtney and Courtney [4] who showed a link between traumatic brain injury and pressure waves originating in the thoracic cavity and extremities.

— Historical Overview of Wound Ballistics Research

== Distant injuries in the WDMET data ==
The Wound Data and Munitions Effectiveness Team (WDMET) gathered data on wounds sustained during the Vietnam War. In their analysis of this data published in the Textbook of Military Medicine, Ronald Bellamy and Russ Zajtchuck point out a number of cases which seem to be examples of distant injuries. Bellamy and Zajtchuck describe three mechanisms of distant wounding due to pressure transients: 1) stress waves 2) shear waves and 3) a vascular pressure impulse.

After citing Harvey's conclusion that "stress waves probably do not cause any tissue damage" (p. 136), Bellamy and Zajtchuck express their view that Harvey's interpretation might not be definitive because they write "the possibility that stress waves from a penetrating projectile might also cause tissue damage cannot be ruled out." (p. 136) The WDMET data includes a case of a lung contusion resulting from a hit to the shoulder. The caption to Figure 4-40 (p. 149) says, "The pulmonary injury may be the result of a stress wave." They describe the possibility that a hit to a soldier's trapezius muscle caused temporary paralysis due to "the stress wave passing through the soldier's neck indirectly [causing] cervical cord dysfunction." (p. 155)

In addition to stress waves, Bellamy and Zajtchuck describe shear waves as a possible mechanism of indirect injuries in the WDMET data. They estimate that 10% of bone fractures in the data may be the result of indirect injuries, that is, bones fractured by the bullet passing close to the bone without a direct impact. A Chinese experiment is cited which provides a formula estimating how pressure magnitude decreases with distance. Together with the difference between strength of human bones and strength of the animal bones in the Chinese experiment, Bellamy and Zajtchuck use this formula to estimate that assault rifle rounds "passing within a centimeter of a long bone might very well be capable of causing an indirect fracture." (p. 153) Bellamy and Zajtchuck suggest the fracture in Figures 4-46 and 4-47 is likely an indirect fracture of this type. Damage due to shear waves extends to even greater distances in abdominal injuries in the WDMET data. Bellamy and Zajtchuck write, "The abdomen is one body region in which damage from indirect effects may be common." (p. 150) Injuries to the liver and bowel shown in Figures 4-42 and 4-43 are described, "The damage shown in these examples extends far beyond the tissue that is likely to direct contact with the projectile." (p. 150)

In addition to providing examples from the WDMET data for indirect injury due to propagating shear and stress waves, Bellamy and Zajtchuck expresses an openness to the idea of pressure transients propagating via blood vessels can cause indirect injuries. "For example, pressure transients arising from an abdominal gunshot wound might propagate through the vena cavae and jugular venous system into the cranial cavity and cause a precipitous rise in intracranial pressure there, with attendant transient neurological dysfunction." (p. 154) However, no examples of this injury mechanism are presented from the WDMET data. However, the authors suggest the need for additional studies writing, "Clinical and experimental data need to be gathered before such indirect injuries can be confirmed." Distant injuries of this nature were later confirmed in the experimental data of Swedish and Chinese researchers, in the clinical findings of Krajsa and in autopsy findings from Iraq.

== Autopsy findings ==
Proponents of the concept point to human autopsy results demonstrating brain hemorrhaging from fatal hits to the chest, including cases with handgun bullets. Thirty-three cases of fatal penetrating chest wounds by a single bullet were selected from a much larger set by excluding all other traumatic factors, including past history.

In such meticulously selected cases brain tissue was examined histologically; samples were taken from brain hemispheres, basal ganglia, the pons, the oblongate and from the cerebellum. Cufflike pattern hemorrhages around small brain vessels were found in all specimens. These hemorrhages are caused by sudden changes of the intravascular blood pressure as a result of a compression of intrathoracic great vessels by a shock wave caused by a penetrating bullet.

— J. Krajsa

An 8-month study in Iraq performed in 2010 and published in 2011 reports on autopsies of 30 gunshot victims struck with high-velocity (greater than 2500 fps) rifle bullets. The authors determined that the lungs and chest are the most susceptible to distant wounding, followed by the abdomen. The study noted that the "sample size was so small [too small] to reach the level of statistical significance". Nevertheless, the authors conclude:

Distant injuries away from the main track in high-velocity missile injuries are very important and almost always present in all cases, especially in the chest and abdomen and this should be put in the consideration on the part of the forensic pathologist and probably the general surgeon.

— R. S. Selman et al.

== Inferences from blast pressure wave observations ==
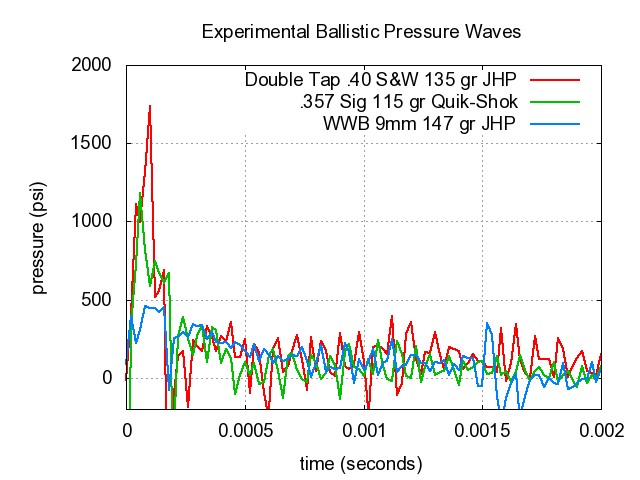
Ballistic pressure waves believed to be the mechanism of hydrostatic shock that were measured with a high speed pressure transducer for the specified loads.

A shock wave can be created when fluid is rapidly displaced by an explosive or projectile. Tissue behaves similarly enough to water that a sonic pressure wave can be created by a bullet impact, generating pressures in excess of 1,500 psi (10,000 kPa).

Duncan MacPherson, a former member of the International Wound Ballistics Association and author of the book, Bullet Penetration, claimed that shock waves cannot result from bullet impacts with tissue. In contrast, Brad Sturtevant, a leading researcher in shock wave physics at Caltech for many decades, found that shock waves can result from handgun bullet impacts in tissue. Other sources indicate that ballistic impacts can create shock waves in tissue.

Blast and ballistic pressure waves have physical similarities. Prior to wave reflection, they both are characterized by a steep wave front followed by a nearly exponential decay at close distances. They have similarities in how they cause neural effects in the brain. In tissue, both types of pressure waves have similar magnitudes, duration, and frequency characteristics. Both have been shown to cause damage in the hippocampus. It has been hypothesized that both reach the brain from the thoracic cavity via major blood vessels.

For example, Ibolja Cernak, a leading researcher in blast wave injury at the Applied Physics Laboratory at Johns Hopkins University, hypothesized, "alterations in brain function following blast exposure are induced by kinetic energy transfer of blast overpressure via great blood vessels in abdomen and thorax to the central nervous system." This hypothesis is supported by observations of neural effects in the brain from localized blast exposure focused on the lungs in experiments in animals.

== Physics of ballistic pressure waves ==
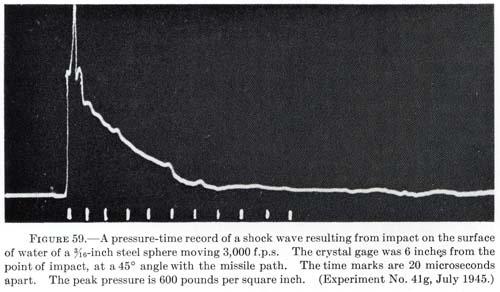
World War II era ballistic pressure wave measurement. Peak is 600 psi (4,100 kPa), duration is 0.12 ms.

A number of papers describe the physics of ballistic pressure waves created when a high-speed projectile enters a viscous medium. These results show that ballistic impacts produce pressure waves that propagate at close to the speed of sound.

Lee et al. present an analytical model showing that unreflected ballistic pressure waves are well approximated by an exponential decay, which is similar to blast pressure waves. Lee et al. note the importance of the energy transfer:

As would be expected, an accurate estimation of the kinetic energy loss by a projectile is always important in determining the ballistic waves.

— Lee, Longoria, and Wilson

The rigorous calculations of Lee et al. require knowing the drag coefficient and frontal area of the penetrating projectile at every instant of the penetration. Since this is not generally possible with expanding handgun bullets, Courtney and Courtney developed a model for estimating the peak pressure waves of handgun bullets from the impact energy and penetration depth in ballistic gelatin. This model agrees with the more rigorous approach of Lee et al. for projectiles where they can both be applied. For expanding handgun bullets, the peak pressure wave magnitude is proportional to the bullet's kinetic energy divided by the penetration depth.

== Remote cerebral effects of ballistic pressure waves ==
Göransson et al. were the first contemporary researchers to present compelling evidence for remote cerebral effects of extremity bullet impact. They observed changes in EEG readings from pigs shot in the thigh. A follow-up experiment by Suneson et al. implanted high-speed pressure transducers into the brain of pigs and demonstrated that a significant pressure wave reaches the brain of pigs shot in the thigh. These scientists observed apnea, depressed EEG readings, and neural damage in the brain caused by the distant effects of the ballistic pressure wave originating in the thigh.

The results of Suneson et al. were confirmed and expanded upon by a later experiment in dogs which "confirmed that distant effect exists in the central nervous system after a high-energy missile impact to an extremity. A high-frequency oscillating pressure wave with large amplitude and short duration was found in the brain after the extremity impact of a high-energy missile..." Wang et al. observed significant damage in both the hypothalamus and hippocampus regions of the brain due to remote effects of the ballistic pressure wave.

== Remote pressure wave effects in the spine and internal organs ==
In a study of a handgun injury, Sturtevant found that pressure waves from a bullet impact in the torso can reach the spine and that a focusing effect from concave surfaces can concentrate the pressure wave on the spinal cord producing significant injury. This is consistent with other work showing remote spinal cord injuries from ballistic impacts.

Roberts et al. present both experimental work and finite element modeling showing that there can be considerable pressure wave magnitudes in the thoracic cavity for handgun projectiles stopped by a Kevlar vest. For example, an 8 gram projectile at 360 m/s impacting a NIJ level II vest over the sternum can produce an estimated pressure wave level of nearly 2.0 MPa (280 psi) in the heart and a pressure wave level of nearly 1.5 MPa (210 psi) in the lungs. Impacting over the liver can produce an estimated pressure wave level of 2.0 MPa (280 psi) in the liver.

== Energy transfer required for remote neural effects ==
The work of Courtney et al. supports the role of a ballistic pressure wave in incapacitation and injury. The work of Suneson et al. and Courtney et al. suggest that remote neural effects can occur with levels of energy transfer possible with handguns, about 500 ft⋅lbf (680 J). Using sensitive biochemical techniques, the work of Wang et al. suggests even lower impact energy thresholds for remote neural injury to the brain. In analysis of experiments of dogs shot in the thigh they report highly significant (p < 0.01), easily detectable neural effects in the hypothalamus and hippocampus with energy transfer levels close to 550 ft⋅lbf (750 J). Wang et al. reports less significant (p < 0.05) remote effects in the hypothalamus with energy transfer just under 100 ft⋅lbf (140 J).

Even though Wang et al. document remote neural damage for low levels of energy transfer, roughly 100 ft⋅lbf (140 J), these levels of neural damage are probably too small to contribute to rapid incapacitation. Courtney and Courtney believe that remote neural effects only begin to make significant contributions to rapid incapacitation for ballistic pressure wave levels above 500 psi (3,400 kPa) (corresponds to transferring roughly 300 ft⋅lbf (410 J) in 12 inches (30 cm) of penetration) and become easily observable above 1,000 psi (6,900 kPa) (corresponds to transferring roughly 600 ft⋅lbf (810 J) in 12 inches (0.30 m) of penetration). Incapacitating effects in this range of energy transfer are consistent with observations of remote spinal injuries, observations of suppressed EEGs and apnea in pigs and with observations of incapacitating effects of ballistic pressure waves without a wound channel.

== Other scientific findings ==
The scientific literature contains significant other findings regarding injury mechanisms of ballistic pressure waves. Ming et al. found that ballistic pressure waves can break bones. Tikka et al. reports abdominal pressure changes produced in pigs hit in one thigh. Akimov et al. report on injuries to the nerve trunk from gunshot wounds to the extremities.

== Hydrostatic shock as a factor in selection of ammunition ==
=== Ammunition selection for self-defense, military, and law enforcement ===
In self-defense, military, and law enforcement communities, opinions vary regarding the importance of remote wounding effects in ammunition design and selection. In his book on hostage rescuers, Leroy Thompson discusses the importance of hydrostatic shock in choosing a specific design of .357 Magnum and 9×19mm Parabellum bullets. In Armed and Female, Paxton Quigley explains that hydrostatic shock is the real source of "stopping power." Jim Carmichael, who served as shooting editor for Outdoor Life magazine for 25 years, believes that hydrostatic shock is important to "a more immediate disabling effect" and is a key difference in the performance of .38 Special and .357 Magnum hollow point bullets. In "The search for an effective police handgun," Allen Bristow describes that police departments recognize the importance of hydrostatic shock when choosing ammunition. A research group at West Point suggests handgun loads with at least 500 ft⋅lbf (680 J) of energy and 12 inches (300 mm) of penetration and recommends:

One should not be overly impressed by the propensity for shallow penetrating loads to produce larger pressure waves. Selection criteria should first determine the required penetration depth for the given risk assessment and application, and only use pressure wave magnitude as a selection criterion for loads meeting minimum penetration requirements. Reliable expansion, penetration, feeding, and functioning are all important aspects of load testing and selection. We do not advocate abandoning long-held aspects of the load testing and selection process, but it seems prudent to consider the pressure wave magnitude along with other factors.

— Courtney and Courtney

A number of law enforcement and military agencies have adopted the 5.7×28mm cartridge. These agencies include the Navy SEALs and the Federal Protective Service branch of the ICE. In contrast, some defense contractors, law enforcement analysts, and military analysts say that hydrostatic shock is an unimportant factor when selecting cartridges for a particular use because any incapacitating effect it may have on a target is difficult to measure and inconsistent from one individual to the next. This is in contrast to factors such as proper shot placement and massive blood loss which are almost always eventually incapacitating for nearly every individual.

The FBI recommends that loads intended for self-defense and law enforcement applications meet a minimum penetration requirement of 12 inches (300 mm) in ballistic gelatin and explicitly advises against selecting rounds based on hydrostatic shock effects.

=== Ammunition selection for hunting ===
Hydrostatic shock is commonly considered as a factor in the selection of hunting ammunition. Peter Capstick explains that hydrostatic shock may have value for animals up to the size of white-tailed deer, but the ratio of energy transfer to animal weight is an important consideration for larger animals. If the animal's weight exceeds the bullet's energy transfer, penetration in an undeviating line to a vital organ is a much more important consideration than energy transfer and hydrostatic shock. Jim Carmichael, in contrast, describes evidence that hydrostatic shock can affect animals as large as Cape Buffalo in the results of a carefully controlled study carried out by veterinarians in a buffalo culling operation.

Whereas virtually all of our opinions about knockdown power are based on isolated examples, the data gathered during the culling operation was taken from a number of animals. Even more important, the animals were then examined and dissected in a scientific manner by professionals.

Predictably, some of the buffalo dropped where they were shot and some didn't, even though all received near-identical hits in the vital heart-lung area. When the brains of all the buffalo were removed, the researchers discovered that those that had been knocked down instantly had suffered massive rupturing of blood vessels in the brain. The brains of animals that hadn't fallen instantly showed no such damage.

— Jim Carmichael

Randall Gilbert describes hydrostatic shock as an important factor in bullet performance on whitetail deer, "When it [a bullet] enters a whitetail's body, huge accompanying shock waves send vast amounts of energy through nearby organs, sending them into arrest or shut down." Dave Ehrig expresses the view that hydrostatic shock depends on impact velocities above 1,100 ft (340 m) per second. Sid Evans explains the performance of the Nosler Partition bullet and Federal Cartridge Company's decision to load this bullet in terms of the large tissue cavitation and hydrostatic shock produced from the frontal diameter of the expanded bullet. The North American Hunting Club suggests big game cartridges that create enough hydrostatic shock to quickly bring animals down.

== See also ==
- Blast injury
- Shock (fluid dynamics)
- Stopping power
- Table of handgun and rifle cartridges
