= Černák =

Černák (feminine: Černáková) is a Slovak surname. Notable people with the surname include:

- Erik Černák (born 1997), Slovak ice hockey player
- Ibolja Cernak, Serbian medical scientist
- Isaka Cernak (born 1989), Australian footballer
- Ľudovít Černák (born 1951), Slovak politician and businessman
- Michal Černák (born 2003), Czech footballer
- Peter Černák (born 1976), Slovak footballer
- Roland Černák (born 1997), Slovak footballer
