= Yevhen Cherniak =

Ukrainian businessman

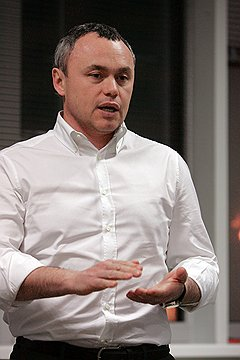
- Born: 12 April 1969 (age 57); Zaporizhzhia, Ukrainian SSR, Soviet Union
- Education: Zaporizhzhia Technical University, Zaporizhzhia National University
- Occupation: Businessman
- Years active: 1993-present
- Children: Alexander (1993), Ivan (2000), Evgeniy (2006)
- Website: https://chernyak.live/

Yevhen Cherniak is a businessman who is the head of the supervisory board of Global Spirits (the biggest alcohol holding in Eastern Europe) and owner of the brand Khortytsia. He holds 19th place on the Ukrainian Forbes top 100.

== Biography ==
Cherniak began his career as general director in Trade House Megalopolis in 1998. In 2002, he was elected as the permanent head of the founding board of Trade House Megalopolis. He has been serving as the chairman of the supervisory board of Global Spirits since 2010.

In the early 2010s, he moved to the United States (first to Miami, later to New York) and was actively involved in business development in North America with his new vodka brand Khor. Cherniak explained his desire to develop business in the American market by more stable markets, higher margins and fair rules.

In 2018, Cherniak started his own YouTube channel (Big Money), in which he interviews famous businessmen and media personalities of the post-Soviet countries. In July 2022, this channel had about 870 thousand subscribers. He also runs paid lectures of the same name held in the cities of Ukraine, and has published two books.

Cherniak is one of the five largest benefactors of Ukraine as the founder and president of the charity foundation Patriot Zaporizhzhia.

In July 2023, amidst the Russian invasion of Ukraine, Cherniak was added to Russia's "list of terrorists and extremists". He was suspected of transferring 500 million roubles (about US$5.5 million at the time) to the Ukrainian Armed Forces "and other Ukrainian units" plus supplying military goods worth 90 million roubles (about U$1 million) to Ukraine.

== Fortune ==
As of 2021, Cherniak is listed in the top 20 of Forbes Ukraine. ($470 million). Chernyak's estimated net worth is based on his earnings in the Ukrainian market which is around 25% of Global Spirits annual turnaround.
