= Ballistic Trajectory Extended Range Munition =

Failed US Navy development program

The Ballistic Trajectory Extended Range Munition (BTERM) was a failed program to develop a precision guided rocket-assisted 127 mm (5-inch) artillery shell for the U.S. Navy. The program was originally named the Autonomous Naval Support Round (ANSR) and was developed by Alliant Techsystems.

The concept was similar to Raytheon's Extended Range Guided Munition with several simplifications and a larger rocket engine. The warhead was based upon that in the AGM-88 HARM anti-radiation missile, and was guided through GPS; however, unlike the ERGM it was intended to fly a strictly ballistic trajectory. Both programs were cancelled in 2008.

== Specification ==
- Caliber: 127 mm (5 in)
- Guidance: GPS/INS
- Propulsion: Solid-propellant rocket engine
- Warhead: Blast-fragmentation

== See also ==
- Long Range Land Attack Projectile – (United States)
- M712 Copperhead – (United States)
- M982 Excalibur – (United States, Sweden)
