= Extended Range Guided Munition =

Cancelled Raytheon 127mm naval round

Navy Image of an ERGM

The Extended Range Guided Munition was a precision guided rocket-assisted 5-inch (127 mm) shell (projectile) development by Raytheon for the U.S. Navy. The program was cancelled in March 2008 after twelve years of development and over 600 million dollars in funding. The developmental round was designated EX 171.

ERGM consisted of three major subsections: propulsion (rocket motor), warhead, and Guidance, Navigation and Control section. ERGM is fired from the 127 mm (5-inch) 62-caliber Mark 45 gun Mod 4, at which point the fins would deploy and the rocket motor would ignite, lifting the munition to at least 80,000 feet (24 km), after which the canards would deploy and guide the ERGM to the target using GPS guidance. It was to be used on Arleigh Burke-class destroyers hulls DDG-81 onward.

== Synopsis ==
Despite the long development time, the ERGM never worked as reliably as the older but significantly less expensive laser-guided M712 Copperhead. During development, the ERGM failed several tests in which the tail fins failed to deploy at launch, rocket motors did not ignite, or the electronic components did not survive the stress of being fired from a gun. In February 2008, guidance components, rocket motors, and tail fins all failed in tests; Raytheon claimed they were testing specific functionalities rather than overall functionality and that they were "on the verge" of making the whole system operate reliably, but the Navy had lost confidence after years of issues and were no longer expecting a return on investment. Rising cost was another factor in cancellation. The unit cost of the shell more than quadrupled, from US$45,000 in 1997 to $191,000 by 2006 (the Copperhead unit production price was about $30,000), reducing the projected buy from 8,500 to about 3,150. Program research-and-development costs had increased from $80 million to $400 million between 1997 and 2004, with total program costs increasing from $400 million to $600 million. The Navy formally cancelled the ERGM program on 19 March 2008. BTERM was another U.S. Navy developmental round that included GPS guidance in an artillery shell; it too was terminated in 2008 after over four years of development by ATK.

== Specifications ==
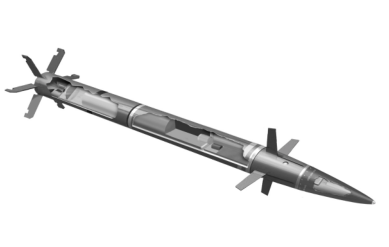
EX-171 ERGM

- Caliber: 127 mm (5 in)
- Length: 1.55 m (5 ft 1 in)
- Weight: 50 kg (110 lb)
- Speed: >3000 km/h (1860 mph)
- Range: 110 km (60 nm)
- Guidance: GPS/INS
- Accuracy: < 20 m CEP independent of range.
- Propulsion: Solid-propellant rocket motor.
- Warhead: 72 DPICM submunitions (EX 1) or unitary high-explosive.

== Program timeline ==
- 1996 - Program started.
- December 2001 - All-up round guided test flight of an ERGM at White Sands Missile Range, NM.
- February 2005 - Successfully test-fired two tactical ERGM rounds.
- April 2005 - U.S. Navy closes original ERGM program and re-opens new competition to meet the requirement.
- March 2008 - Navy ends funding to Raytheon, effectively killing the program.

== See also ==
- Ballistic Trajectory Extended Range Munition
- Long Range Land Attack Projectile
- Rocket Assisted Projectile
- M982 Excalibur
