= Czerniak (surname) =

Czerniak is a Polish surname. Notable people with the surname include:

- Konrad Czerniak
- Moshe Czerniak
- Svetlana Czerniak, birth name of Orit Zuaretz
- Tim Czerniak and Elis Czerniak of Halves (band)
