= Wound ballistics =

Study of effects of ballistic trauma

The field of wound ballistics largely comprises the study of the physical and physiological effects of ballistic trauma by projectiles (primarily, but not exclusively, bullets) on living humans or animals. It can be considered the interdisciplinary intersection of trauma medicine and terminal ballistics.

== See also ==
- Bullet hit squibs
- Gunshot injury
- Hydrostatic shock
- Penetrating trauma
- Sniper
- Stopping power
