= Yan Chernyak =

- Born: 6 April 1909; Chernivtsi, Ukraine
- Died: 19 February 1995 (aged 85); Moscow, Russia
- Occupation: Spy

Yan Chernyak (6 April 1909 – 19 February 1995) was a World War II era spy who led a network of several dozen people in Germany working for the Soviet Union's military intelligence, the GRU. He was nicknamed "man without a shadow" for his ability to move around undetected.

Chernyak (alternative Latin-character spelling Czerniak), was born in 1909, in North Bukovina, Austro-Hungarian Empire. The region was occupied by the Red Army of the Soviet Union in 1940 and henceforth was part of Ukraine.

Chernyak is said to have been half-Jewish (father), half-Hungarian (mother), both parents dying during the First World War. He grew up in an orphanage and apparently spoke six languages (German, Yiddish, Hungarian, Romanian, Czech and Slovak) by the time he was sixteen; by the time that he graduated from the Prague Higher Technical School, he also spoke English and French. However, some accounts have him studying at the polytechnic in Berlin.

Among the many agents run by Chernyak are said to have been the famous actresses of the Third Reich, Marika Rokk and Olga Chekhova.

Chernyak is credited with "obtaining information used to devise the first Soviet radar, which formed part of Moscow's air defenses during Nazi raids in 1941, according to a statement from the Russian army's general staff. Chernyak also was "instrumental in developing the Soviet Union's nuclear weapons program, the statement said. Details of his spy activities remain secret. After World War II, and until retiring in 1969, Chernyak was a translator for the official Soviet news agency, Tass. In February 1995, he received the Hero of Russia award, the nation's highest honor."

Chernyak became a Soviet citizen in 1946.

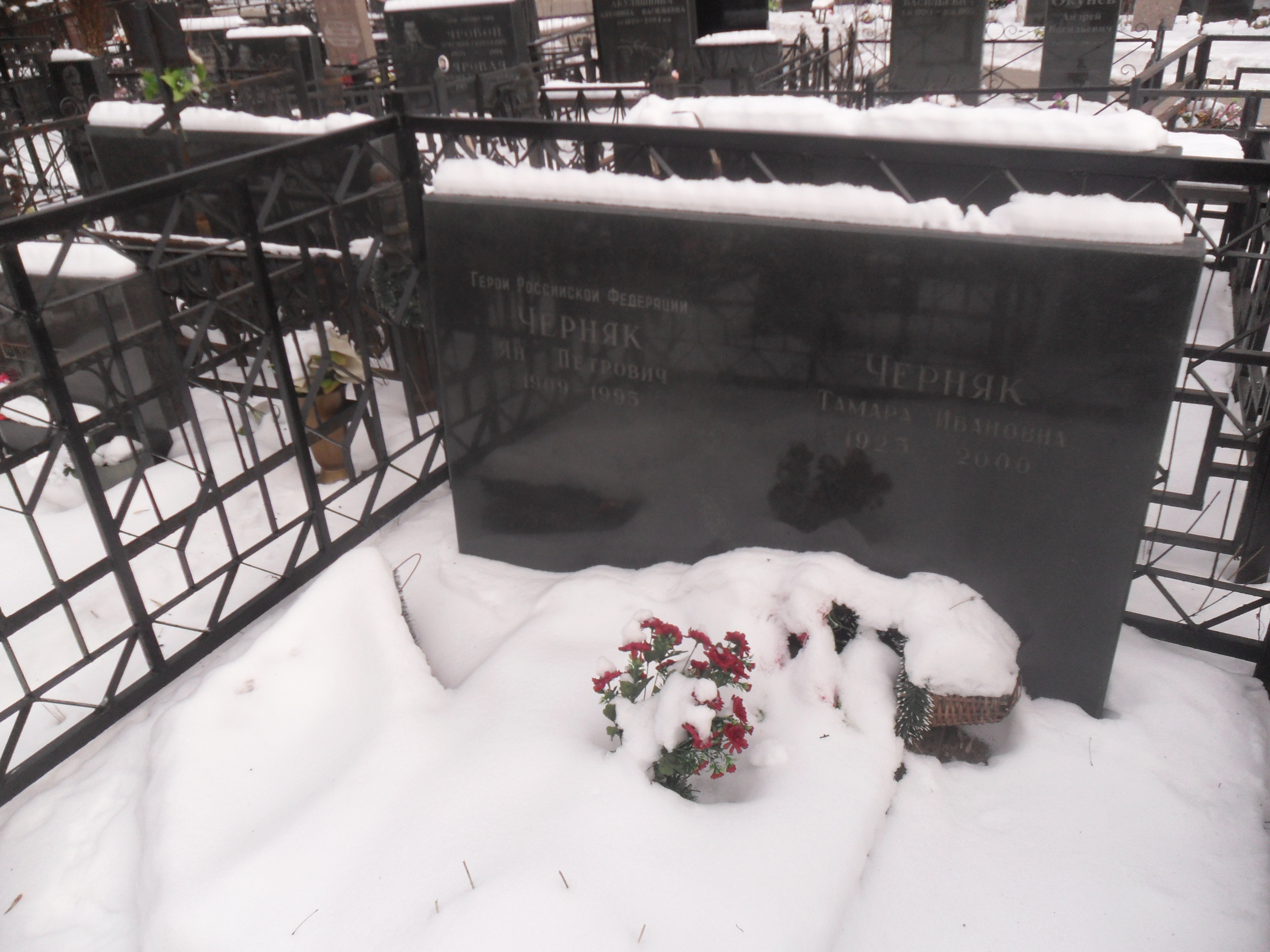
Chernyak's grave at the Preobrazhenskoye Cemetery in Moscow

He was made a Hero of the Russian Federation in December 1994, two months before he died on 19 February 1995.

== See also ==
- List of Heroes of the Russian Federation
