= Włodzimierz Czarniak =

Polish alpine skier (1934–1964)

Personal information
- Nationality: Polish
- Born: 26 May 1934 Zakopane, Poland
- Died: 29 January 1964 (aged 29) Kraków, Poland

Sport
- Sport: Alpine skiing

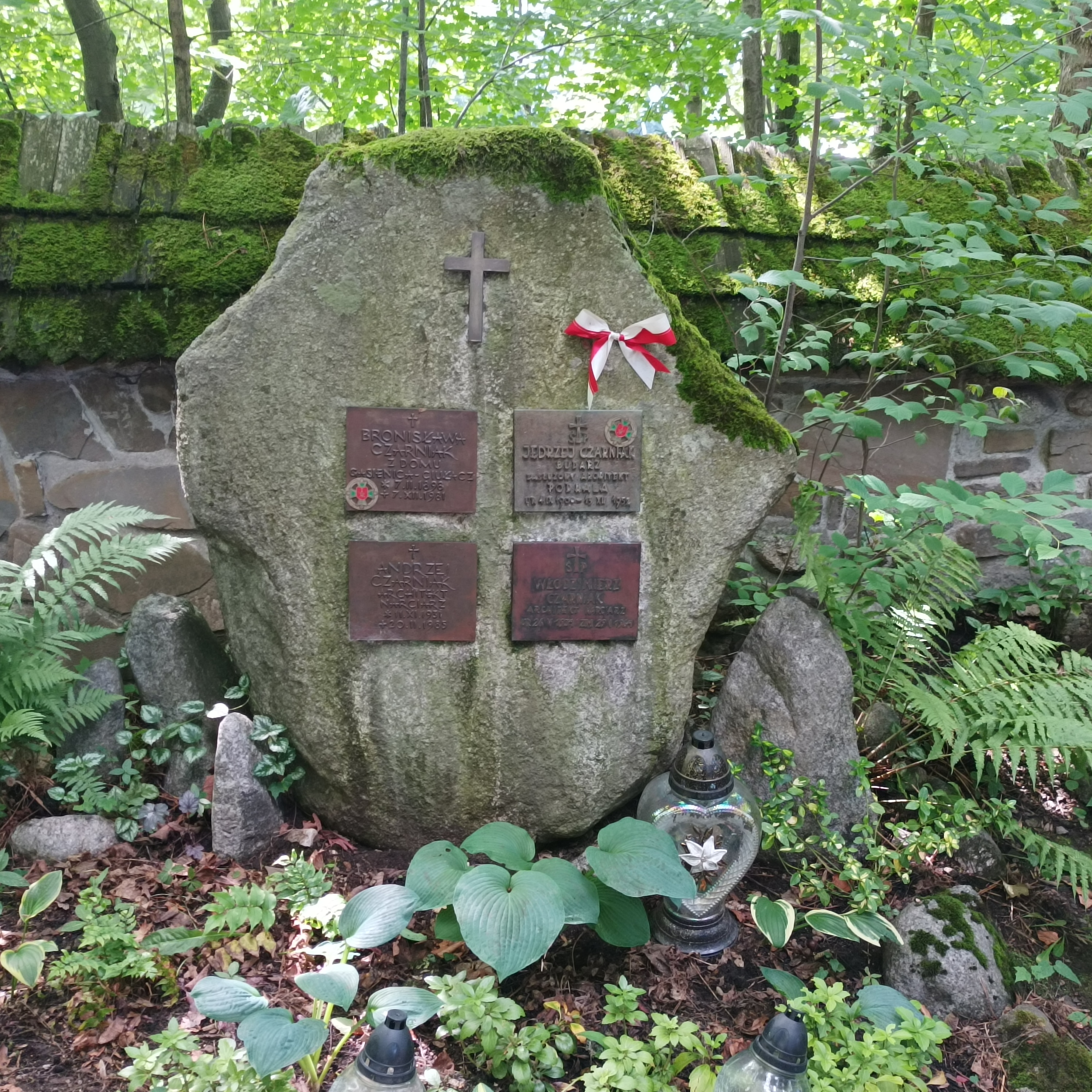
The grave of Andrzej and Włodzimierz Czarniak at the Cemetery of Meritorious Persons at Pęksowy Brzyzek

Włodzimierz Czarniak (26 May 1934 – 29 January 1964) was a Polish alpine skier. He competed in the men's giant slalom at the 1956 Winter Olympics.
