= Andrzej Czarniak =

Polish alpine skier (1931–1985)

Personal information
- Nationality: Polish
- Born: 11 November 1931; Zakopane, Poland
- Died: 23 February 1985 (aged 53); Nowy Sącz, Poland

Sport
- Sport: Alpine skiing

Andrzej Czarniak (11 November 1931 – 23 February 1985) was a Polish alpine skier. He competed in the men's downhill at the 1952 Winter Olympics. During his sports career, he represented the CWKS Zakopane club. At the Oslo Olympics, he competed in the downhill run, taking 42nd place.
