= Ibolja Cernak =

Ibolja Cernak is an American researcher in blast wave injury. Cernak concluded in the 1990s that soldiers who had been subjected to blasts were suffering from traumatic brain injury (TBI), while most still considered their invisible injuries to be Post Traumatic Stress Syndrome (PTSD), and to be psychological rather than physical. Cernak is Chair of Military and Veterans’ Clinical Rehabilitation at the Faculty of Rehabilitation at the University of Alberta.

== Early life ==
She was born in Senta and graduated at the University of Belgrade. She took an undergraduate degree in physics, a medical degree in pathophysiology, and a PhD in neuroscience.

== Discovery in Belgrade ==
Cernak was a doctor treating soldiers on the Kosovo battlefield when she observed behavior problems in soldiers whose common history was having been near blasts. She concluded that the soldiers were suffering from physical brain injuries. She collected blood samples from soldiers and did a study cataloging the neurological effects of blast on 1,300 recruits. Although she presented her findings at conferences, it was not until the mid 2000s that other medical professionals began to understand the physical nature of the blast injury.

== Research positions ==
She was Medical Director and Principal Professional Staff at the Johns Hopkins University Applied Physics Laboratory, where she did research into the effects of blasts on bodies.

Cernak moved to a research position as the Chair in Military and Veterans' Clinical Rehabilitation in the Faculty of Rehabilitation Medicine at the University of Alberta in 2012. The university created a laboratory specifically to study the effect of blasts on humans after soldiers returning from foreign posts showed signs of blast wave injury.

== Awards ==
2015 Global News Woman of Vision

== Selected works ==
- Cernak, Ibolja, et al. "Ultrastructural and functional characteristics of blast injury-induced neurotrauma." Journal of Trauma and Acute Care Surgery 50.4 (2001): 695-706.
- Di Giovanni, S., Movsesyan, V., Ahmed, F., Cernak, I., Schinelli, S., Stoica, B., & Faden, A. I. (2005). Cell cycle inhibition provides neuroprotection and reduces glial proliferation and scar formation after traumatic brain injury. Proceedings of the National Academy of Sciences of the United States of America, 102(23), 8333-8338.
- Cernak, Ibolja, and Linda J. Noble-Haeusslein. "Traumatic brain injury: an overview of pathobiology with emphasis on military populations." Journal of Cerebral Blood Flow & Metabolism 30.2 (2010): 255-266.
- Cernak, Ibolja. "Animal models of head trauma." NeuroRx 2.3 (2005): 410-422.
- Cernak, Ibolja, et al. "Blast injury from explosive munitions." Journal of Trauma and Acute Care Surgery 47.1 (1999): 96-103.
- Bilotta, F., Caramia, R., Cernak, I., Paoloni, F. P., Doronzio, A., Cuzzone, V., ... & Rosa, G. (2008). Intensive insulin therapy after severe traumatic brain injury: a randomized clinical trial. Neurocritical care, 9(2), 159-166.
- Cernak, Ibolja, et al. "The pathobiology of moderate diffuse traumatic brain injury as identified using a new experimental model of injury in rats." Neurobiology of Disease 17.1 (2004): 29-43.
