= 5-inch/54-caliber Mark 45 gun =

Naval artillery gun

Mark 45 5-inch gun mount
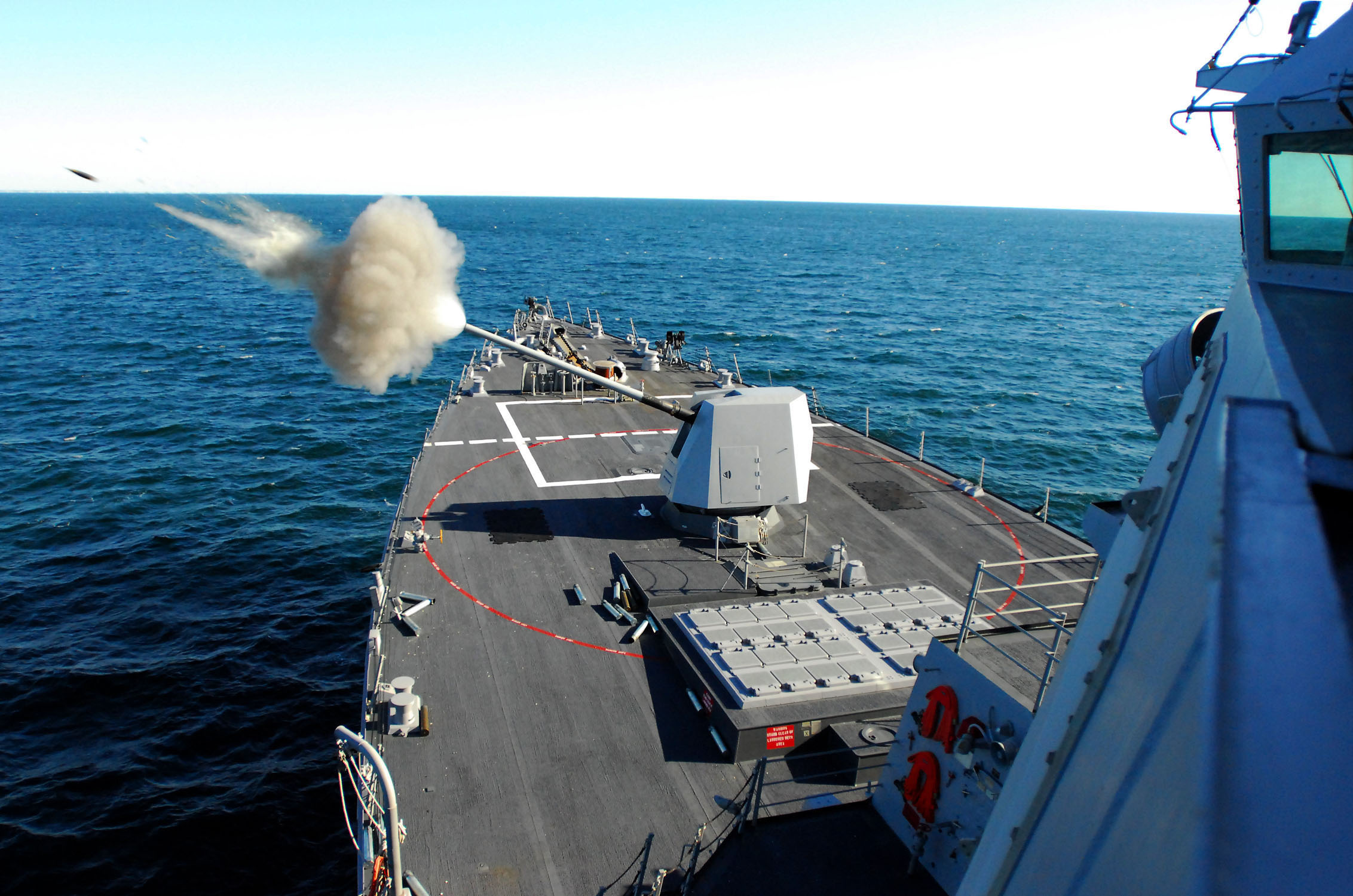
- 5-inch/62-caliber Mark 45 Mod 4, in flat-panel gun turret, test firing on USS Forrest Sherman
- Type: Naval gun
- Place of origin: United States

Service history
- In service: 1971–present: Mod 0: 1971; Mod 1: 1980; Mod 2: 1988; Mod 4: 2000
- Used by: See Operators

Production history
- Designed: 1968
- Manufacturer: United Defense (now BAE Systems Land & Armaments)
- Produced: 1971

Specifications (Mod 2)
- Mass: 21,691 kg (47,820.5 lb)
- Length: 8.992 m (29 ft 6.0 in)
- Barrel length: 6.858 m (22 ft 6.0 in); Rifling: 5.82 m (19 ft 1 in): Mod 4: 7.874 m (25 ft 10.0 in)
- Shell: 127 × 835 mm .R; Conventional: 31.75 kg (70.0 lb)
- Caliber: 54 caliber (Mod 1 and Mod 2) 62 caliber (Mod 4)
- Elevation: −15° to +65°; Max. elevation rate: 20°/s
- Traverse: ±170° from centerline; Max. traversing rate: 30°/s
- Rate of fire: 16–20 rounds per minute automatic
- Muzzle velocity: 2,500 ft/s (760 m/s); 1,500 ft/s (460 m/s) reduced charge for defilade fire or illumination rounds
- Effective firing range: 13 nmi (24.1 km) or 20 nmi (37.0 km) (Mod 4)

The 5-inch (127 mm)/54-caliber (Mk 45) lightweight gun is a U.S. naval artillery gun mount consisting of a 5 in (127 mm) L54 Mark 19 gun on the Mark 45 mount. The later 62-calibre-long version consists of a longer-barrel L62 Mark 36 gun fitted on the same Mark 45 mount. The gun is designed for use against surface warships, anti-aircraft and shore bombardment to support amphibious operations. The gun mount features an automatic loader with a capacity of 20 rounds which can be fired under full automatic control, taking a little over a minute at maximum fire rate. For sustained use, the gun mount would be occupied by a six-person crew (gun captain, panel operator, and four ammunition loaders) below deck to keep the gun continuously supplied with ammunition.

It was designed and built by United Defense, a company later acquired by BAE Systems Land & Armaments, which continued manufacture.

== History ==
Development started in the 1960s as a replacement for the 5-inch (127 mm)/54-caliber Mark 42 gun system that had debuted in 1953, with a new, lighter, and easier-to-maintain gun mounting. The United States Navy uses the Mark 45 with either the Mk 86 Gun Fire Control System or the Mk 34 Gun Weapon System.

Since before World War II, 5 inches (127 mm) has been the standard gun caliber for U.S. Naval ships. Its rate of fire is lower than the British 4.5 in (114 mm) gun, but it fires a heavier 5-inch (127 mm) shell which carries a larger burst charge that increases its effectiveness against aircraft.

== Variants ==
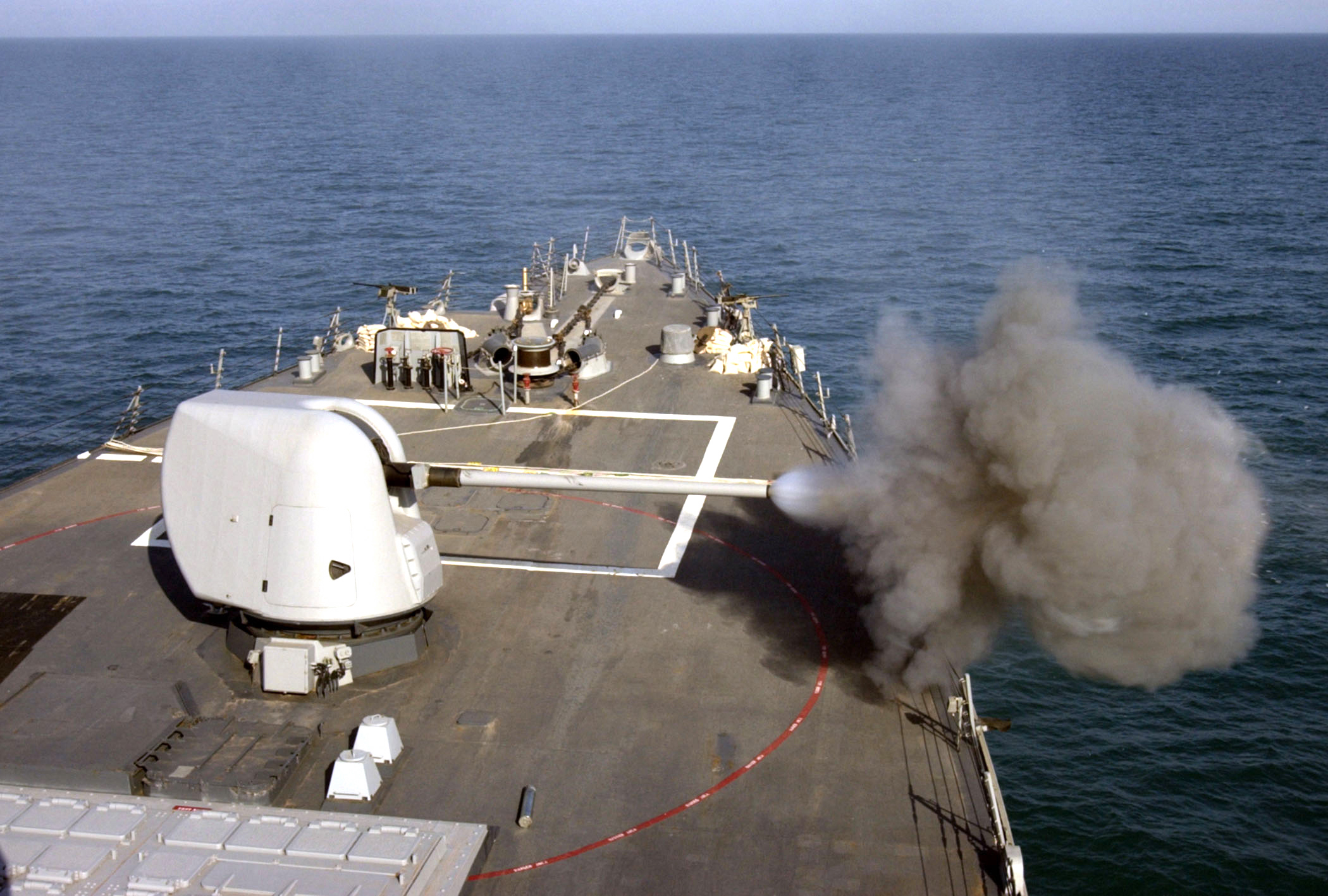
Mod 2

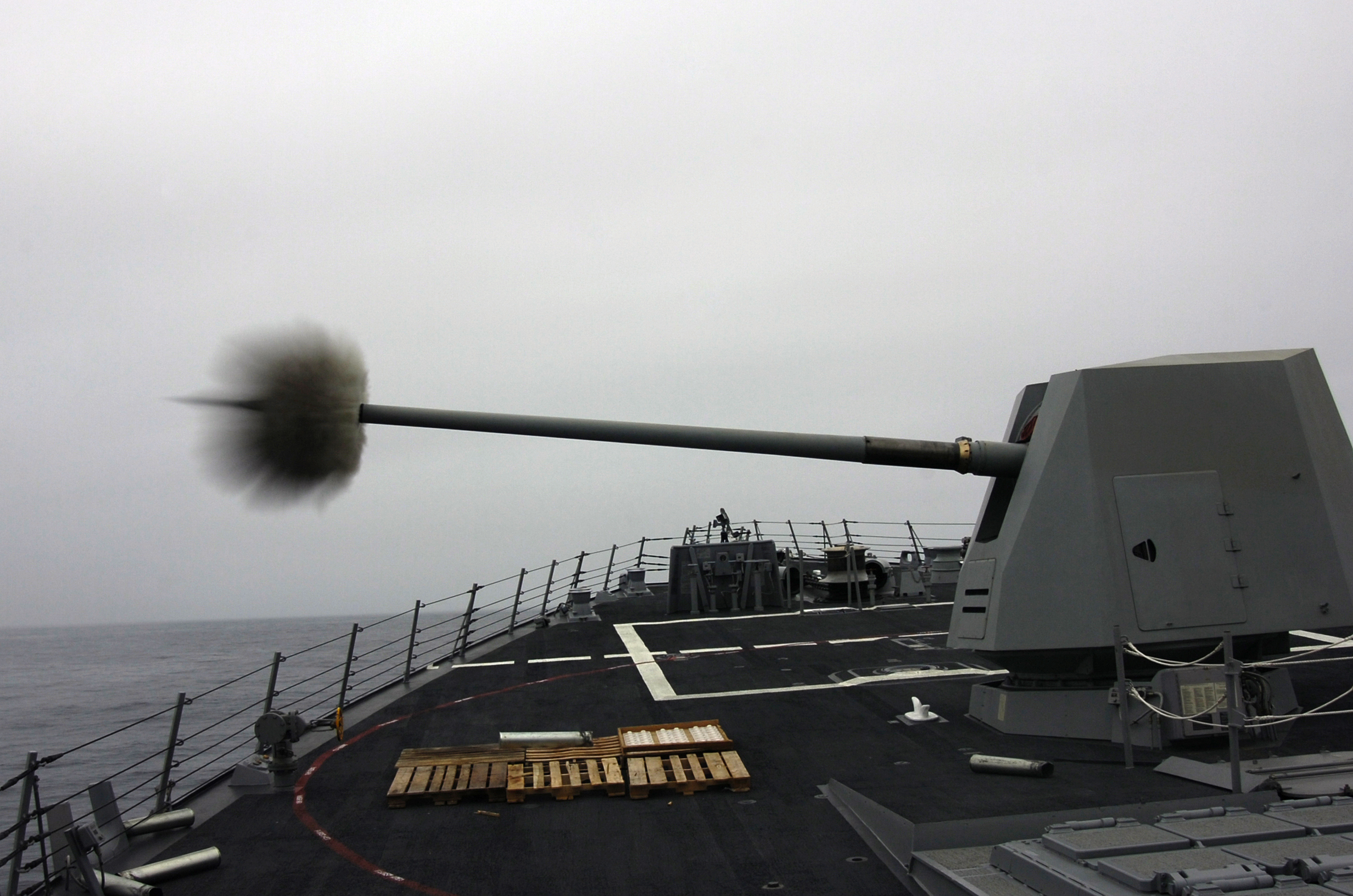
Mod 4

=== Mod 0 ===
Used mechanical fuze setter. Two-piece rifled construction, with replaceable liner.

=== Mod 1 ===
Electronic fuze setter replaces the mechanical one. Made with a unitary construction barrel, which has a life span approximately twice that of the Mark 42 gun.

=== Mod 2 ===
Export version of Mod 1, but now used in the U.S. Navy.

=== Mod 3 ===
Mod 2 gun with a new control system. Never put into production.

=== Mod 4 ===
Receives a longer 62-caliber barrel (versus Mod 1 and 2's 54 caliber) for more complete propellant combustion and higher velocity and thus more utility for land attack. Designed to use the Mark 171 Extended Range Guided Munition (ERGM), which was canceled. The Mk 45 mod 4 uses a modified flat-panel gun turret, designed to reduce its radar signature.

In sustained firing operations (Mode III), the gun is operated by a six-person crew: a gun captain, a panel operator, and four ammunition loaders, all located below decks. In fully automatic non-sustained firing operations (Mode IV), 20 rounds can be fired without any personnel inside the mount, using an autoloader.

In 2024–2025, U.S. Navy destroyers in the Red Sea increasingly employed the Mk 45 gun to defend themselves and merchants against one-way attack drones, launched by the Houthi rebels from Yemen during the Red Sea crisis.

== Ammunition ==
Mark 68 HE-CVT

- Weight – 68.5 lb (31.1 kg)
- Projectile Length – 26.1 in (66.3 cm)
- Used only with Mods 0–2

Mark 80 HE-PD

- Weight – 67.6 lb (30.7 kg)
- Projectile Length – 26 in (66 cm)
- Explosive filler: 8.2 lb (3.7 kg) Composition B

Mark 91 Illum-MT

- Weight – 63.9 lb (29.0 kg)
- Projectile Length – 26.1 in (66.3 cm)

Mark 116 HE-VT

- Weight – 69.7 lb (31.6 kg)
- Projectile Length – 26 in (66 cm)

Mark 127 HE-CVT

- Weight – 68.6 lb (31.1 kg)
- Projectile Length – 26 in (66 cm)

Mark 156 HE-IR

- Weight – 69.0 lb (31.3 kg)
- Projectile Length – 26 in (66 cm)

Mark 172 HE-ICM (Cargo Round)

- Projectile Length – 26 in (66 cm)
- Used only with Mod 4

=== Guided shell ===
In May 2014, the U.S. Navy issued a request for information (RFI) for a guided 5-inch (127 mm) projectile capable of being fired from Mark 45 guns aboard Navy destroyers and cruisers. This RFI followed the cancellation of the Raytheon Extended Range Guided Munition program approximately six years earlier. The proposed munition was required to achieve at least twice the range of conventional unguided shells and support missions including Naval Surface Fire Support (NSFS)/land attack and enhanced anti-surface warfare (ASuW) against fast attack craft (FAC) and fast inshore attack craft (FIAC). A primary objective was to defeat swarming small-boat threats at extended ranges using a proximity fuse airburst fragmentation warhead capable of dispersing shrapnel over a wide area.

Submissions included the BAE Systems Multi Service–Standard Guided Projectile (MS-SGP), Raytheon Excalibur N5, and the OTO Melara Vulcano guided long-range projectile.

By 2015, Naval Sea Systems Command was investigating the feasibility of firing a version of the hyper-velocity projectile (HVP), originally developed for Navy electromagnetic railgun systems, from conventional 5-inch deck guns. Employing HVP from existing platforms was intended to enhance engagement capability against land, air, and missile threats while allowing additional time for railgun development. The HVP concept also offered a potentially lower-cost alternative to missile interceptors, which can cost hundreds of thousands to millions of dollars per engagement. As of 2015, adapting HVP for conventional guns was not a formal program of record.

When fired from conventional 5-inch guns, HVP rounds were expected to achieve velocities of approximately Mach 3—about half the velocity attained when fired from a railgun, but roughly twice that of standard naval gun projectiles. Although more expensive than unguided shells, HVPs were projected to be significantly less costly than missile interceptors, while providing engagement ranges against air and missile threats of approximately 10–30 nautical miles (12–35 mi; 19–56 km).

During the 2018 RIMPAC exercises, USS Dewey (DDG-105) fired 20 HVP rounds from a standard Mk 45 deck gun. The 2019 unit cost estimates ranged from US$75,000 to $100,000 per round, compared to approximately $1–2 million per missile interceptor.

Within the electromagnetic railgun program, the HVP was later redesignated as the Gun-Launched Guided Projectile (GLGP). In 2022, the U.S. Department of the Navy terminated GLGP research and development.

In 2024, the Navy resumed developmental testing of the Hypervelocity Projectile, manufactured by BAE Systems USA. The HVP is a saboted projectile also being developed under a U.S. Army contract. While the Army variant uses a larger 155 mm sabot, the projectile body is common to both services; the Navy version employs a smaller 5-inch (127 mm) sabot compatible with Mk 45 guns.

== Operators ==
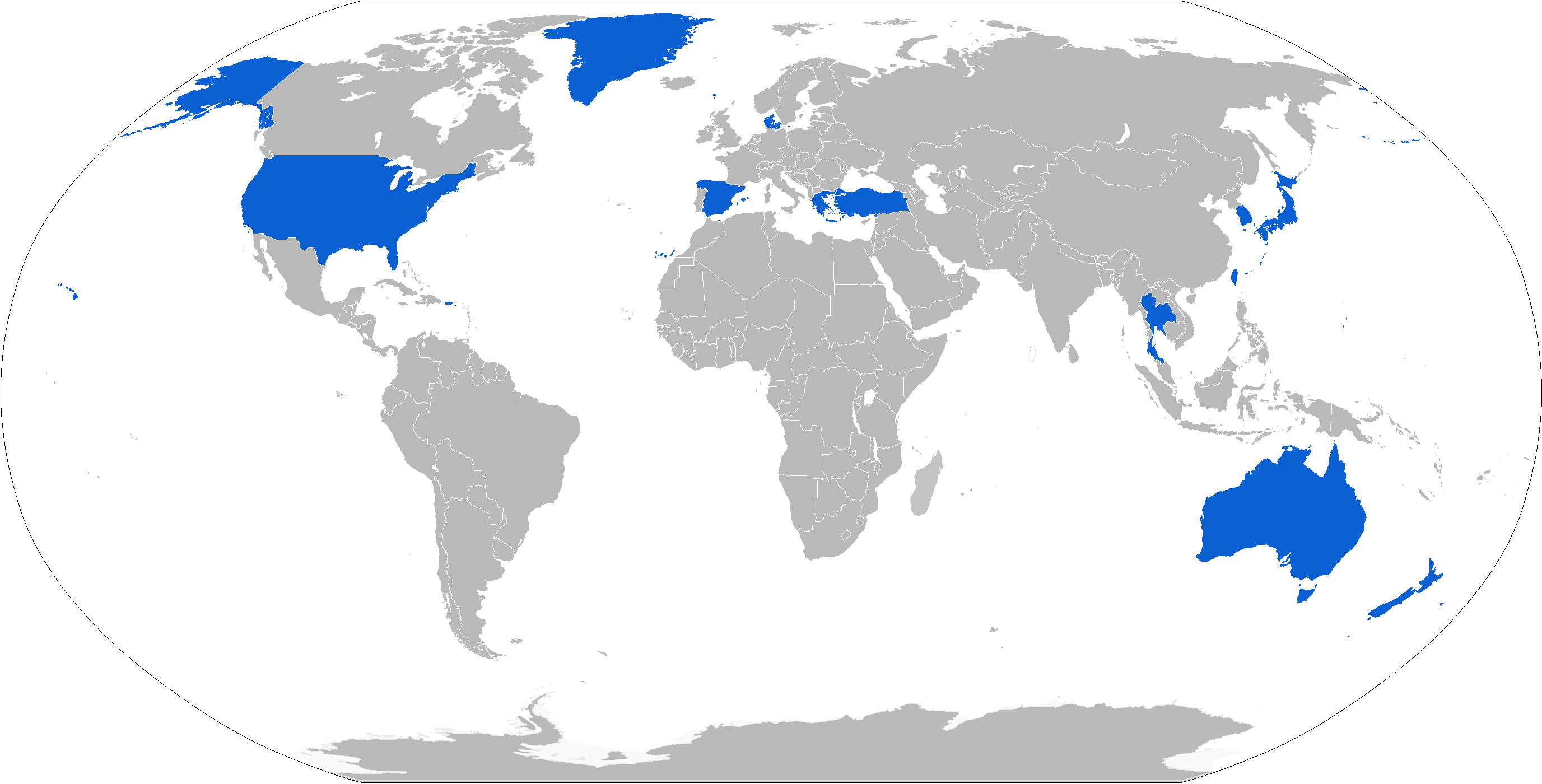
A map of 5-inch/54-caliber Mark 45 operators in blue

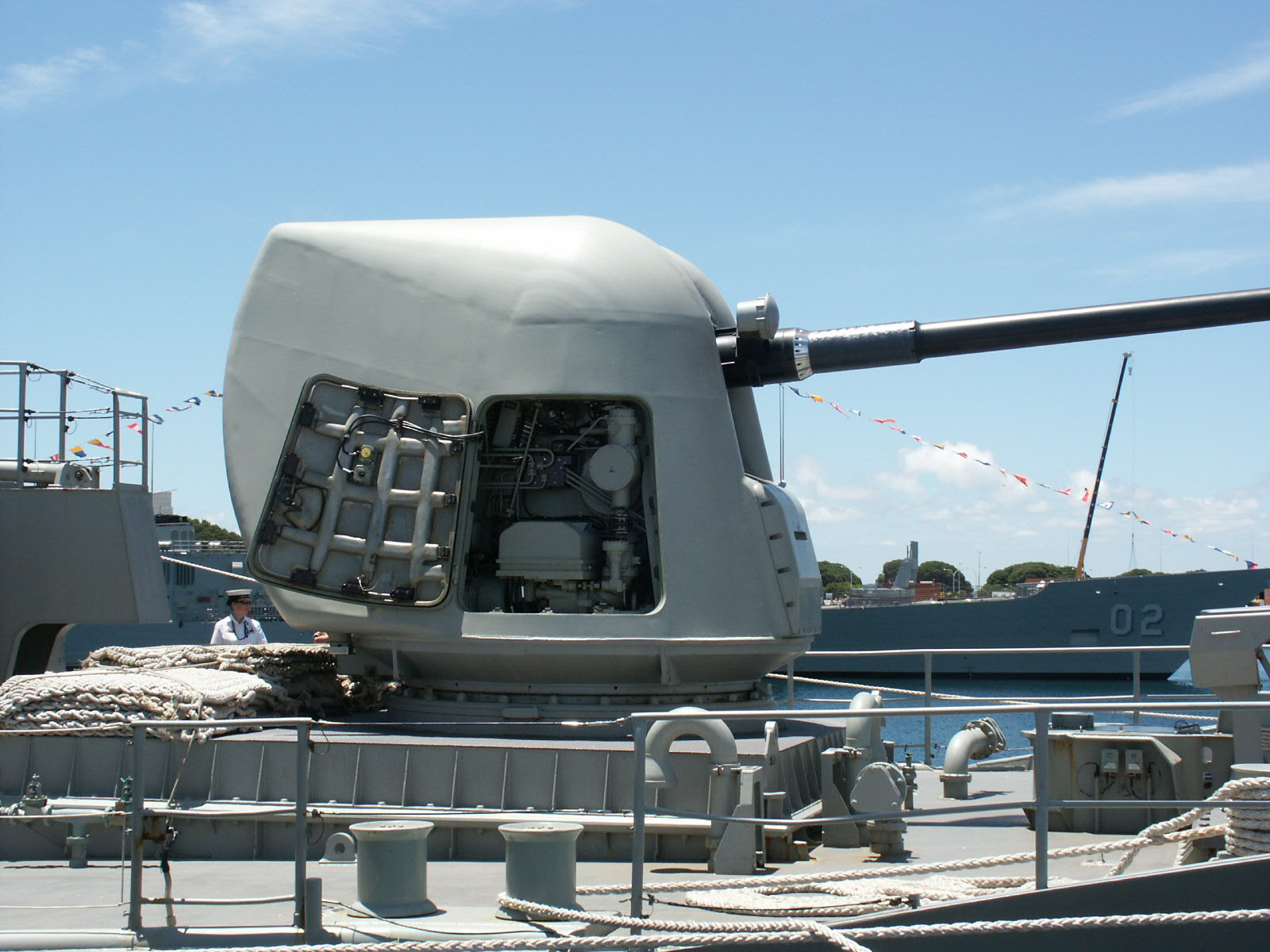
A Mod 2 gun aboard the Australian Anzac-class frigate HMAS Arunta

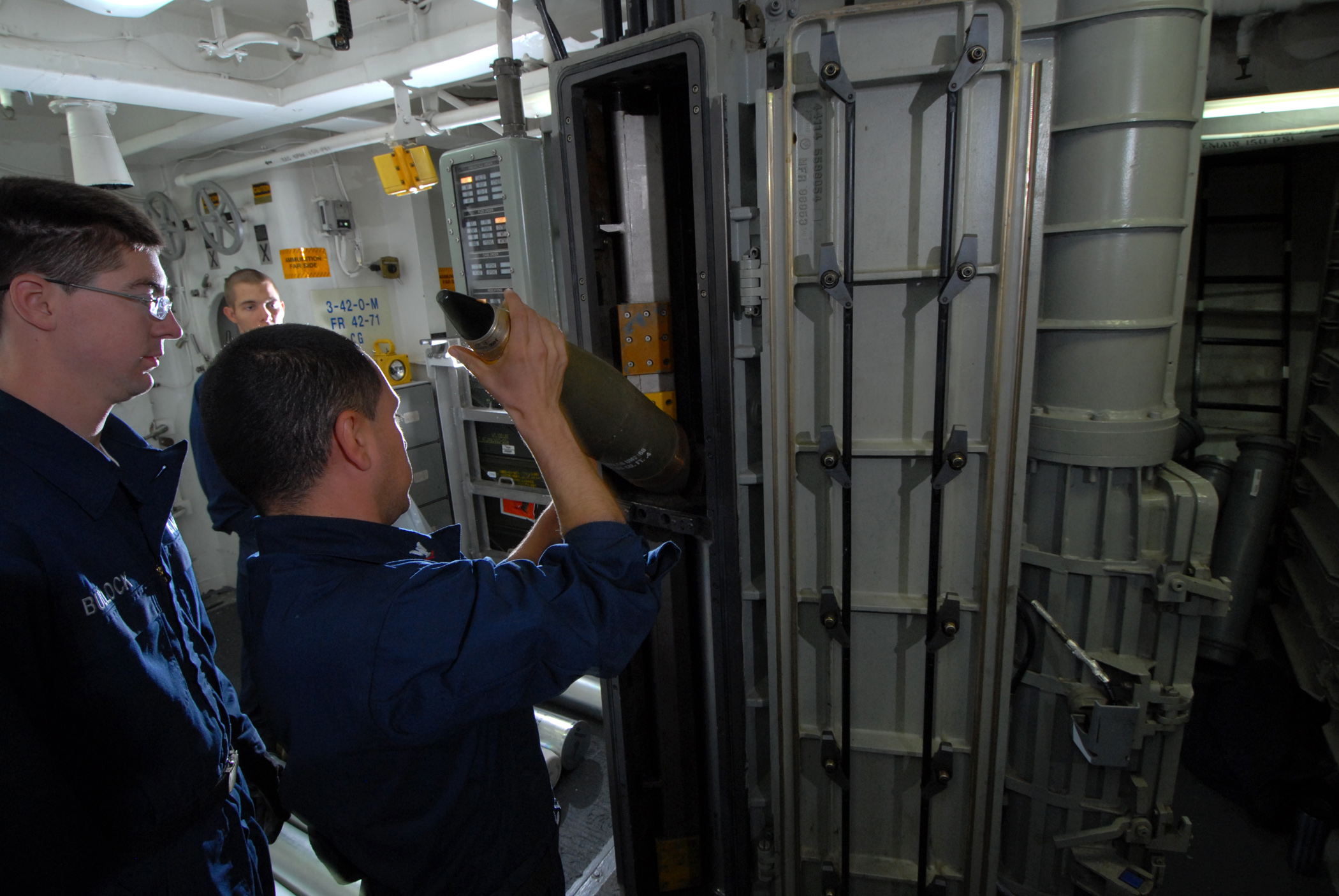
Loading a 70-pound (32 kg) 5-inch round in the below-deck gun mount

=== Current operators ===
Australia

- Royal Australian Navy
  - Anzac-class frigate: Mod 2, upgraded Mod 2 versions fitted with a Common Control System.
  - Hobart-class destroyer: Mod 4

Denmark

- Royal Danish Navy
  - Absalon-class frigate: Mod 2

Greece

- Hellenic Navy
  - Hydra-class frigate (MEKO 200 HN)

Japan

- Japan Maritime Self-Defense Force
  - Mogami-class frigate: Mod 4
  - Atago-class destroyer: Mod 4
  - Maya-class destroyer: Mod 4
  - Akizuki-class destroyer: Mod 4
  - Asahi-class destroyer: Mod 4

South Korea

- Republic of Korea Navy
  - Sejong the Great-class destroyer: Mod 4
  - Chungmugong Yi Sun-sin-class destroyer: Mod 4
  - Incheon-class frigate: Mod 4

New Zealand

- Royal New Zealand Navy
  - Anzac-class frigate: Mod 2

Spain

- Spanish Navy
  - Álvaro de Bazán-class frigate: Mod 2

Taiwan

- Republic of China Navy
  - Kee Lung-class destroyer

Thailand

- Royal Thai Navy
  - Naresuan-class frigate: Mod 2, upgraded to Mod 4

Turkey

- Turkish Navy
  - Barbaros-class frigate (MEKO 200 TN II)
  - Yavuz-class frigate (MEKO 200 TN I)

United States

- United States Navy
  - Active service ships:
    - Ticonderoga-class cruiser: Mod 2
      - CG-52-73: Mod 4 after receiving the cruiser modernization
    - Arleigh Burke-class destroyer:
      - DDG 51–80: Mod 2
      - DDG 81–112: Mod 4
  - Decommissioned:
    - California-class cruiser
    - Kidd-class destroyer
    - Spruance-class destroyer
    - Tarawa-class amphibious assault ship (later removed)
    - Virginia-class cruiser
    - USS Norton Sound (AVM-1) (testbed, later removed)

=== Future operators ===
Australia

- Royal Australian Navy
  - Hunter-class frigate: 3 ships ordered of 6 planned

United Kingdom

- Royal Navy
  - Type 26 frigate: 8 ships ordered (Mod 4)

Turkey

- Turkish Navy
  - TF2000-class frigate: 8 ships planned

Canada

- Royal Canadian Navy
  - River-class destroyer: 15 ships planned (Mod 4)

=== Cancelled deals ===
India

- Indian Navy: The mod 4 variant was planned to be deployed on 7 Nilgiri-class frigate and 4 Visakhapatnam-class destroyer. The procurement of 13 guns was cleared by the Indian Ministry of Defence in April 2018. Of the guns, 11 would be deployed on the above-mentioned ships while 2 would be in the INS Dronacharya missile and gunnery school, and the INS Valsura electrical and weapons engineering school. The US Defense Security Cooperation Agency cleared under the Foreign Military Sales for the same deal in 2019. The deal would be worth over $1 billion. In 2021, India moved on to the development of an indigenous gun of similar calibre due to cost and logistics factor. Till the completion of the development, the 11 destroyers and frigates would be fitted with already operational OTO Melara 76 mm naval gun. The 13 gun deal for the Indian Navy did not go through.

== See also ==
- Extended Range Guided Munition: long range (~60 nautical miles (110 km; 69 mi)) precision guided projectile program by Raytheon for the Mark 45 gun, canceled in 2008
- Advanced Gun System: The 155 mm (6 in) gun on Zumwalt-class destroyers

=== Weapons of comparable role, performance and era ===
- Otobreda 127/54 Compact and Otobreda 127/64: contemporary 127 mm naval gun from Italian manufacturer Oto Melara
- 4.5 inch Mark 8 naval gun: contemporary standard naval gun for British ships
- AK-130: contemporary 130 mm twin standard naval gun mounting for Russian ships
- H/PJ-38 130mm naval gun : contemporary 130 mm standard naval gun mounting for Chinese ships
- French 100 mm naval gun: contemporary standard naval gun for French ships
