= CG(X) =

US Navy cruiser research program

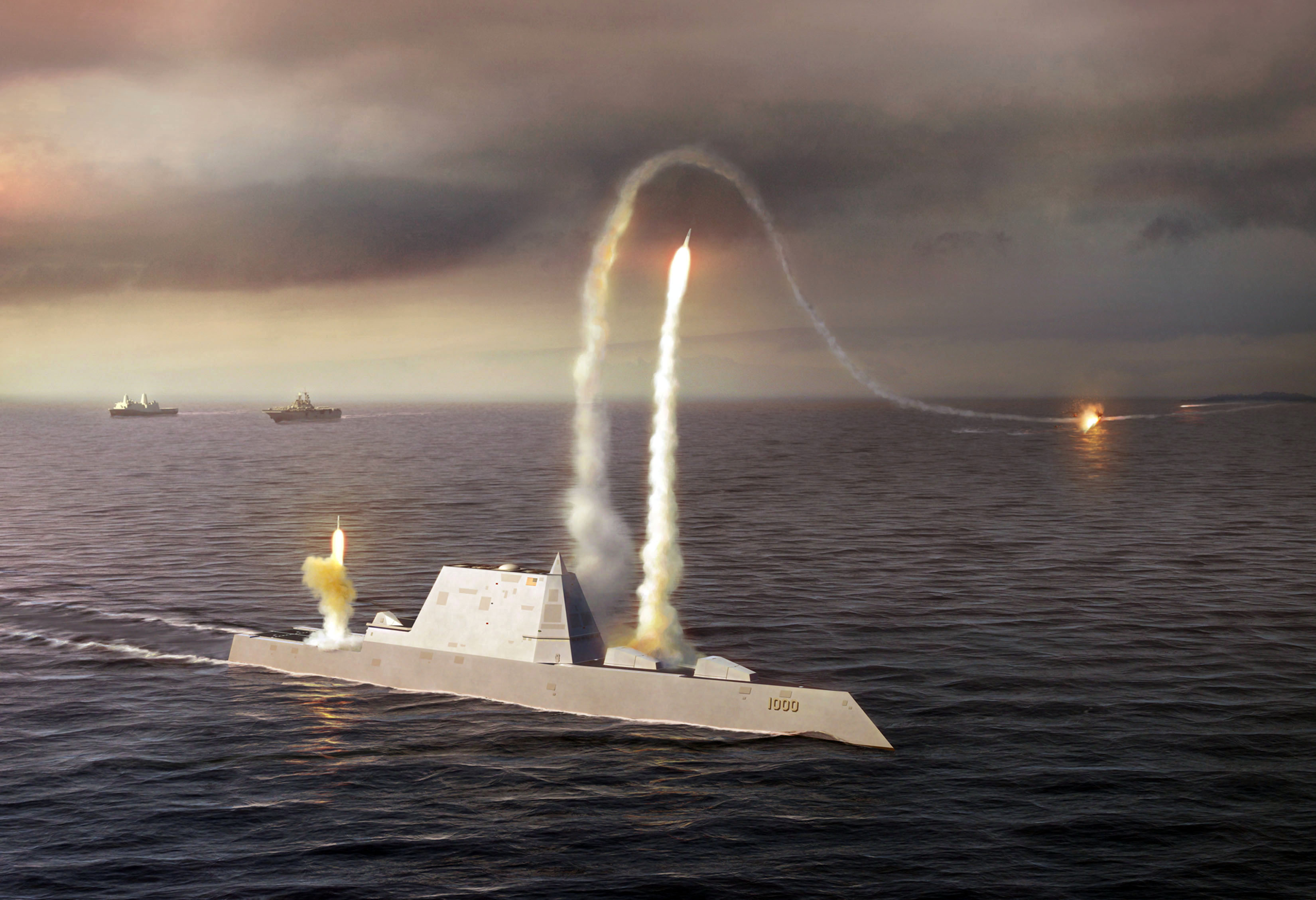
- CG(X) may have used the hull of the Zumwalt-class destroyer, seen here.

Class overview
- Name: CG(X)
- Operators: United States Navy
- Preceded by: Ticonderoga class
- Cost: US$3.2 billion (forecast for lead ship)
- In commission: Cancelled (planned 2017)
- Planned: 19
- Building: none
- Canceled: 19

General characteristics
- Type: Cruiser
- Displacement: 20,000–25,000 tons
- Installed power: Nuclear
- Propulsion: Integrated Electric
- Armament: 128 to 256 VLS; 2 × 155 mm (6 in)/62 caliber Advanced Gun System

The CG(X) program, also known as the Next Generation Cruiser program, was a United States Navy research program to develop a replacement vessel for its 22 Ticonderoga-class cruisers. Original plans were for 18–19 ships, based on the 14,500 ton Zumwalt-class destroyer with additional ballistic missile defense and area air defense for a carrier group. These vessels were to enter service beginning in 2017. The program was ended in 2010 with its mission to be fulfilled by the successor to the Flight III Arleigh Burke-class destroyers.

== History ==
=== Background ===
In the early 1990s, the U.S. Armed Forces had to respond to new threats and budgets after the end of the Cold War. The U.S. Navy's response was the Surface Combatant for the 21st Century (SC-21) program. This envisaged a destroyer called DD-21 and a planned cruiser called CG-21. Budget cuts in November 2001 meant that SC-21 became the less ambitious Future Surface Combatant program. The DD-21 was renamed DD(X), which was later named the Zumwalt-class destroyer. By April 2002, DD(X) was to be the "foundation" for a family of surface combatants, including CG(X) as the successor to the CG-21. The Ticonderoga-class cruisers will reach their retirement age of 35 years between 2021 and 2029, although the U.S. Navy may use upgrades to extend their lives to 40 years.

=== Next Generation Cruiser ===
The CG(X) program was announced on 1 November 2001. An initial requirement for 18 CG(X) was raised to 19 under the plan for a 313-ship Navy in 2005.

A reassessment in 2007 suggested splitting the CG(X) into two classes: fourteen "escort cruisers" of a size similar to that of the future Zumwalt class and five 23,000 ton ballistic missile defense ships. There was political pressure for some or all of these ships to be nuclear powered.

The fiscal year (FY)2009 budget called for procurement of the first CG(X) in 2011, and the second in 2013. On 1 February 2010, U.S. President Barack Obama unveiled his proposed budget for FY2011. This budget called for, among other things, canceling the entire CG(X) program.

The program was cancelled in the 2010 Quadrennial Defense Review. The CG(X)'s mission will instead be performed by DDG-51 Flight III destroyers, after the U.S. Navy concluded that the ships could rely on off-board and space-based sensors and so did not need a radar bigger than the DDG could carry.

== Design ==
=== Hull ===
In April 2002, John Young, Assistant Secretary of the Navy for Research, Development and Acquisition, stated that "the DD(X) hull will be the base from which they propose the design changes necessary to evolve this to CG(X). That could include various things from lengthening the hull and changing the size, but it will be, to our view, likely the basic hull form shape, appropriately sized and with the proper features added to accommodate the CG(X) mission". The Chief of Naval Operations claimed in 2005 that "the DD(X) hull and propulsion plant will be spiraled into the CG(X) platform with about 80% design overlap". In the same testimony, he stated that designing a new hull would cost about $4B.

However, concerns began to grow about the stability of Zumwalt's hull. Naval architect Ken Brower said in April 2007 that "as a ship pitches and heaves at sea, if you have tumblehome instead of flare, you have no righting energy to make the ship come back up. On the [Zumwalt], with the waves coming at you from behind, when a ship pitches down, it can lose transverse stability as the stern comes out of the water - and basically roll over." There were also doubts whether the Zumwalt hull was big enough to accommodate ballistic defense weapons, and a possible nuclear propulsion system. In July 2007 came the first suggestions that the AOA might recommend a two-class solution, a 14,000 ton "escort cruiser" based on Zumwalt's stealthy tumblehome hull, and a ballistic missile defense ship of 23,000 tons. The latter would use a more conventional shape than the tumblehome, as its use of radars to search for missiles while on station would make a stealthy hull pointless. In July 2008, Roscoe Bartlett of the House Seapower subcommittee stated that it was "unlikely the [Zumwalt] hull could be used in the CG(X) program".

=== Propulsion ===
The CG(X) would have used the IPS electric propulsion system of Zumwalt, as of the FY09 budget estimates in February 2008. Zumwalt's gas turbines are capable of generating 78 megawatts (105,000 hp), and that was thought barely sufficient for the radar and future weapon systems on the CG(X) - the working assumption is that the entire ship's electric load, including a Theater Ballistic Missile Defense radar will consume 31 megawatts (MW). In July 2008, Young said that "for the most capable radar suites under consideration, the [Zumwalt] hull cannot support the radar".

Meanwhile, members of the House Projection Forces Subcommittee had been pressing the Navy to use nuclear power for major combatants, partly as a response to concerns about the price and availability of oil. They prompted studies in 2005 and 2006, the second of which stated that nuclear power broke even at an oil price of $70–$225 per barrel for escort ships of 21–26,000 tonnes with heavy radar use. This led to a requirement in the FY2008 Defense Authorization Act that all major combatant vessels be nuclear powered unless it was not in the national interest.

The Navy studied nuclear power as a design option for the CG(X), but has never announced whether it would prefer to build the CG(X) as a nuclear-powered ship - it would have added $600–800M to the initial cost of the ship, but save on running costs. Under normal budgeting practices, long lead-time items for nuclear propulsion would have needed to be procured in FY2009 if the main ship were to be procured in FY2011. If the two-class solution had been pursued, it seems probable that the escort cruiser would have used gas turbines like Zumwalt, and the larger ballistic missile defense ship would have been nuclear powered, and hence known as the CGN(X).

The AOA apparently looked at two options, using two of the Seawolf-class submarines' 43 MW S6W reactors of which 34 MW is used for propulsion, and halving one of the two 550 thermal MW A4W reactors used in Nimitz-class aircraft carriers. The first option would not even match Zumwalt for power, while the second option probably would not fit into the Zumwalt hull. On the other hand, it would give plenty of headroom for future weapon systems such as directed-energy weapons and railguns, hence the proposal for the ballistic missile defense ship of a larger hull with nuclear propulsion.

=== Sensors ===
The CG(X) radar system would likely have been a development of the AN/SPY-3 dual-band active electronically scanned array radar of the Zumwalt class. It might also have been influenced by the replacement for the AN/SPQ-11 Cobra Judy missile-tracking radar on USNS Observation Island. As mentioned above, a future Theater Ballistic Missile Defense radar is being modelled as consuming 31 MW of electrical power, compared to 5 MW for the AEGIS system on an Arleigh Burke-class destroyer.

=== Weapons ===
A CG(X) based on the Zumwalt hull would lose one or both of its guns, and replace them with more VLS launchers for anti-aircraft missiles. However, Zumwalt's lack of capability in air defense and ballistic missile defense was cited as a major reason for the near-cancellation of the class in July 2008. Recent intelligence that China is developing targetable anti-ship ballistic missiles based on the DF-21 appears to be shaping the Navy's thinking on the CG(X)'s capabilities, when previously Zumwalt's air defense was believed to be good enough to justify delaying the introduction of the CG(X).

The Kinetic Energy Interceptor program was developing new weapons against ballistic missiles, but the missiles would have taken up six times more space than SM-3s and a Zumwalt-sized hull could not carry a meaningful number. They were considered to be dropped from the CG(X) program before ultimately being canceled altogether in May 2009 due to "technical and financial" reasons.

== See also ==
- List of cruisers of the United States Navy
