= USS Michael Monsoor =

US naval guided missile destroyer

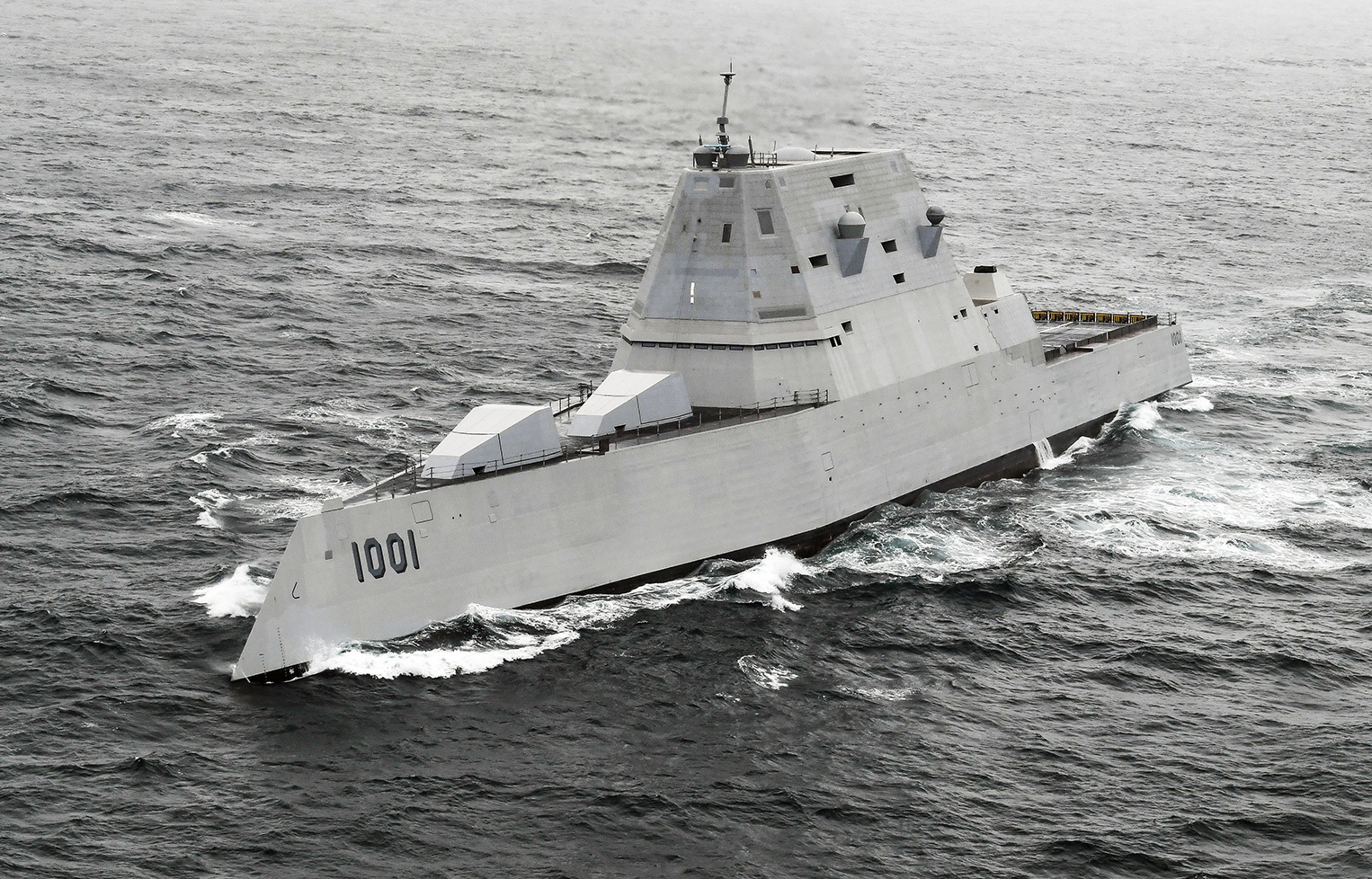
- USS Michael Monsoor on 20 April 2021

History

United States
- Name: Michael Monsoor
- Namesake: Michael A. Monsoor
- Awarded: 15 September 2011
- Builder: Bath Iron Works
- Cost: US$1.4 billion
- Laid down: 23 May 2013
- Launched: 20 June 2016
- Christened: 18 June 2016
- Acquired: 24 April 2018
- Commissioned: 26 January 2019
- Home port: San Diego
- Identification: MMSI number: 368926267; Callsign: NMAM; Hull number: DDG-1001
- Motto: I Will Defend
- Status: In active service
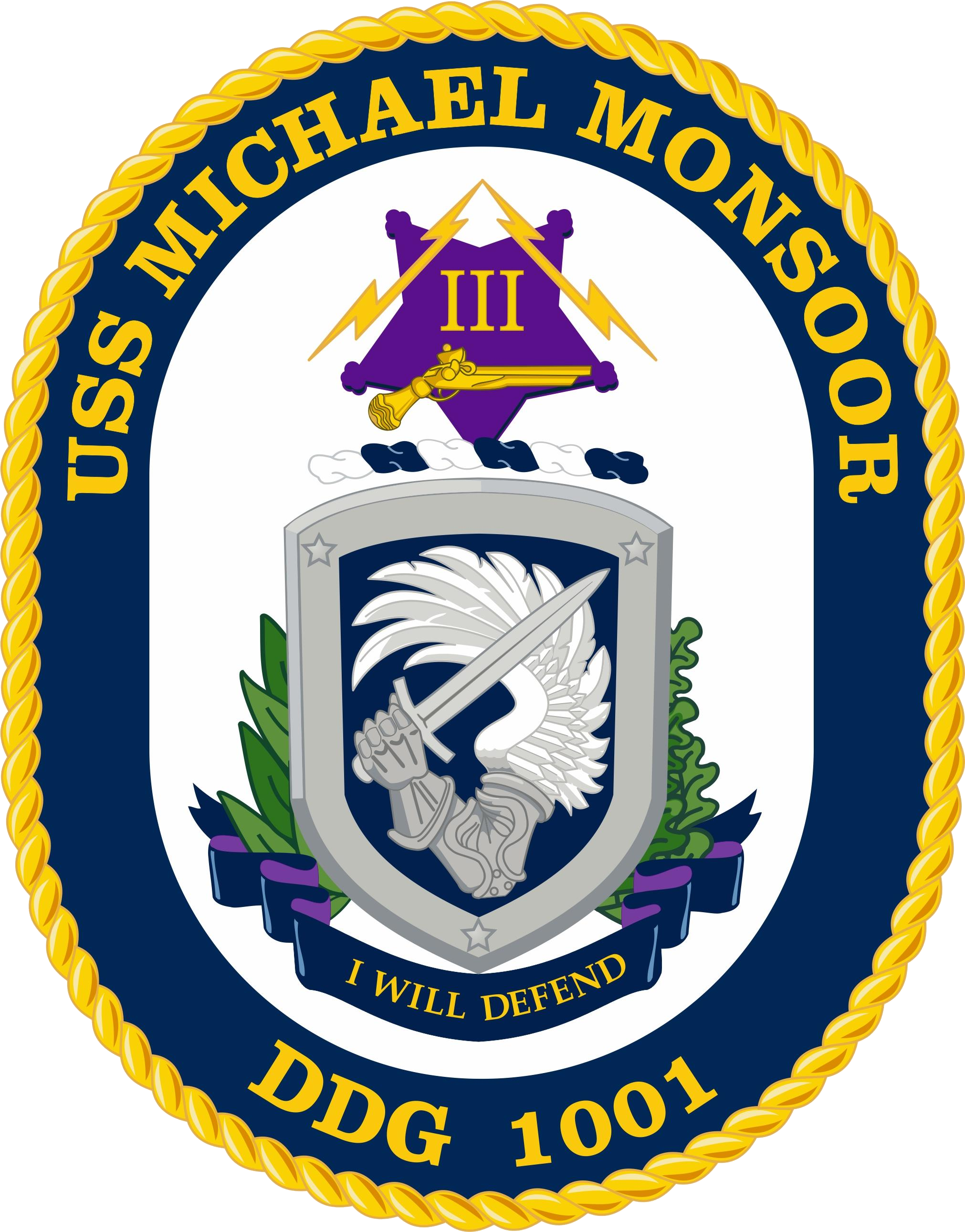
- Badge

General characteristics
- Class & type: Zumwalt-class destroyer
- Displacement: 14,564 long tons (14,798 t)
- Length: 600 ft (182.9 m)
- Beam: 80.7 ft (24.6 m)
- Draft: 27.6 ft (8.4 m)
- Propulsion: 2 × Rolls-Royce MT30 gas turbines (35.4 MW ea.) driving Curtiss-Wright electric generators; 2 × Rolls-Royce RR4500 turbine generators (3.8 MW ea.); 2 × propellers driven by electric motors; Total: 78 MW (105,000 shp)
- Speed: 30.3 knots (56.1 km/h; 34.9 mph)
- Complement: 140
- Sensors & processing systems: AN/SPY-3 Multi-Function Radar (MFR) (X-band, scanned array); Volume Search Radar (VSR) (S-band, scanned array)
- Armament: 20 × MK 57 VLS modules, with 4 vertical launch cells in each module, 80 cells total. Each cell can hold one or more missiles, depending on the size of the missiles.; Evolved Sea Sparrow Missile (ESSM); Tactical Tomahawk; Vertical Launch Anti-Submarine Rocket (ASROC); 2 × 155 mm Advanced Gun System, with a 920 round magazine. Unusable, no ammunition.; 2 × Mk 46 Mod 2 Gun Weapon System
- Aircraft carried: 2 × SH-60 LAMPS helicopters or; 1 × MH-60R helicopter; 3 × MQ-8 Fire Scout VTUAV
- Aviation facilities: Hangar Bay, Helicopter Pad

USS Michael Monsoor (DDG-1001) is the second ship of the three-ship Zumwalt class of guided missile destroyers. The Zumwalt-class was designed as a multi-mission surface combatant for land attack and littoral operations with a mission of supporting both ground campaigns and the joint/naval battlespace. The main guns are a pair of Advanced Gun Systems (AGS). The Navy cancelled the ammunition procurement program for the only type of ammunition it can use, so the AGS cannot provide naval gunfire support and the Zumwalts were repurposed for surface warfare.

== Design ==
Michael Monsoor is the second Zumwalt-class destroyer. The ship is 600 feet (180 m) in length, with a beam of 80.7 feet (24.6 m) and displacing approximately 15,000 tons. Michael Monsoor has a crew size of approximately 148 officers and sailors; she can make speed in excess of 30 knots (56 km/h; 35 mph).

=== Namesake ===
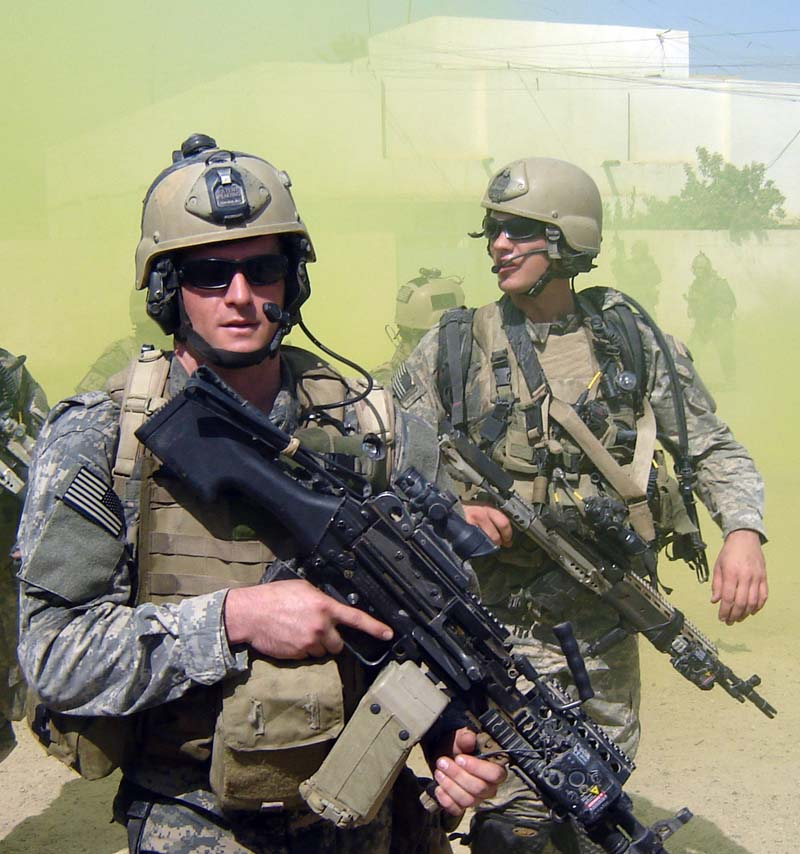
Ship's namesake, Michael A. Monsoor

Michael Monsoor is named after Master-at-Arms Petty officer Second Class and Medal of Honor recipient Michael A. Monsoor (1981–2006). The United States Navy SEAL was killed during the Iraq War and posthumously awarded his Medal of Honor.

== Construction and career ==
Assembly of modules for Michael Monsoor began in March 2010. The keel laying and authentication ceremony for Michael Monsoor was held at the General Dynamics Bath Iron Works shipyard on 23 May 2013. Michael Monsoor was launched on 21 June 2016.

=== Electrical failure during trials ===
On 4 December 2017, Michael Monsoor had problems with the complex electrical system which ended builders' trials early and forced the ship to return to the General Dynamics Bath Iron Works shipyard in Maine. A harmonic filter aboard failed one day after she left the yard. The ship returned to the yard on 5 December 2017. Harmonic filters are used in complex electrical systems to prevent unintended power fluctuations from damaging sensitive equipment. The delay in sea trials would not affect her expected March 2018 delivery.

=== Service with the U.S. Navy ===
The Navy chose to use an unusual two-part commissioning scheme for the Zumwalt-class. The initial commissioning was done prior to weapons systems integration, and the ships were placed in the status of "in commission, special", before sailing to San Diego for weapons installation and final acceptance. Zumwalt and Michael Monsoor used this scheme, while the third and final ship in the class, Lyndon B. Johnson, will use the more traditional approach with formal commissioning after final acceptance.

Michael Monsoor was delivered to the Navy in April 2018, and commissioned on 26 January 2019, at Naval Air Station North Island. She is homeported at Naval Base San Diego. Chief of Naval Operations Admiral Mike Gilday visited Michael Monsoor while in San Diego on 25 February 2021.

Michael Monsoor participated in RIMPAC 2022.

== See also ==
- Mountain Warfare Training Camp Michael Monsoor
