= USS Lyndon B. Johnson =

Zumwalt-class destroyer of the US Navy

USS Lyndon B. Johnson (DDG-1002)
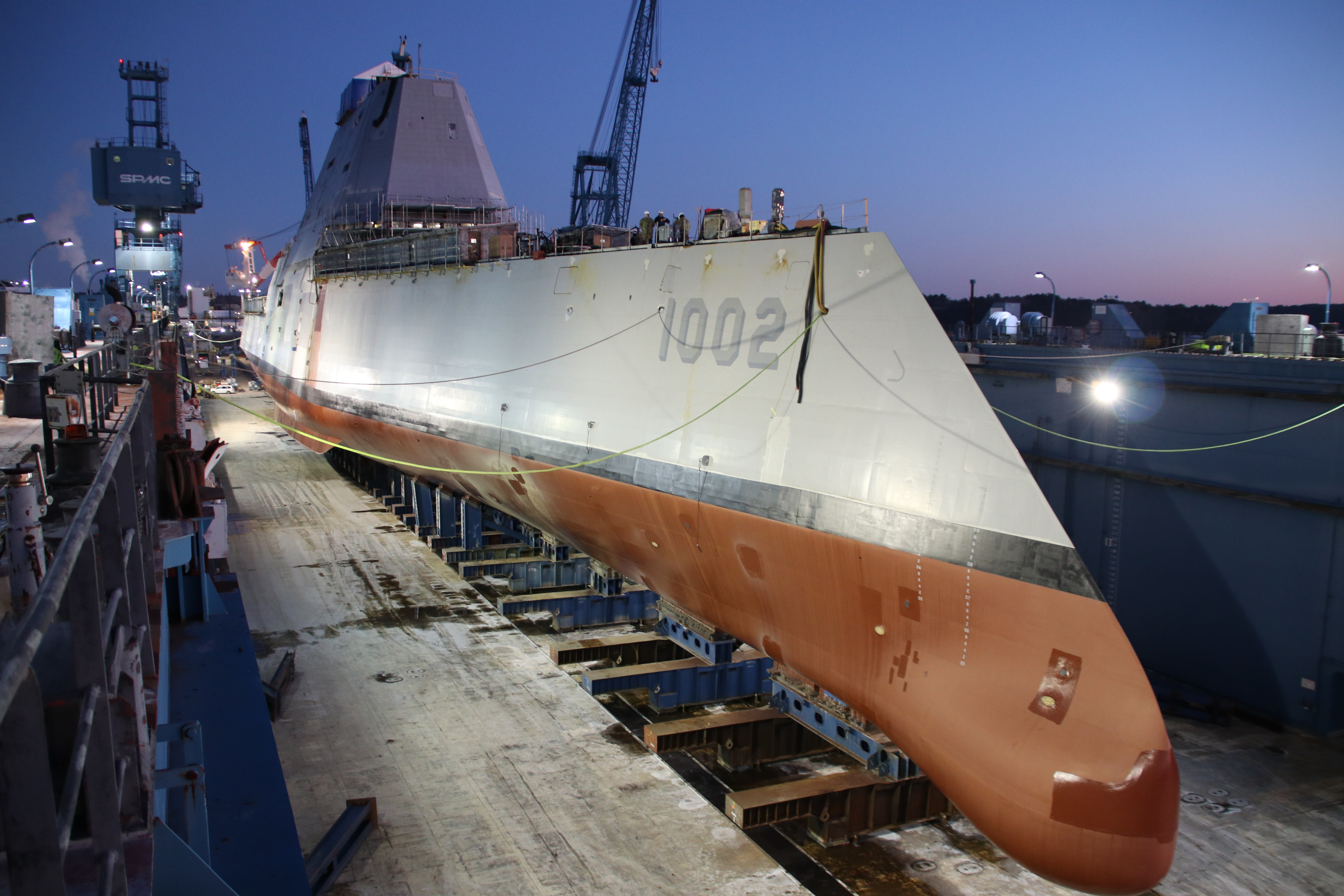
- USS Lyndon B. Johnson at the Bath Iron Works in December 2018

History

United States
- Name: Lyndon B. Johnson
- Namesake: Lyndon B. Johnson
- Awarded: 15 September 2011
- Builder: Bath Iron Works
- Laid down: 30 January 2017
- Launched: 9 December 2018
- Sponsored by: Lynda Bird Johnson Robb
- Christened: 27 April 2019
- Home port: Pascagoula, Mississippi
- Identification: Hull number: DDG-1002
- Motto: In Defense of Great Society
- Status: Under sea trials
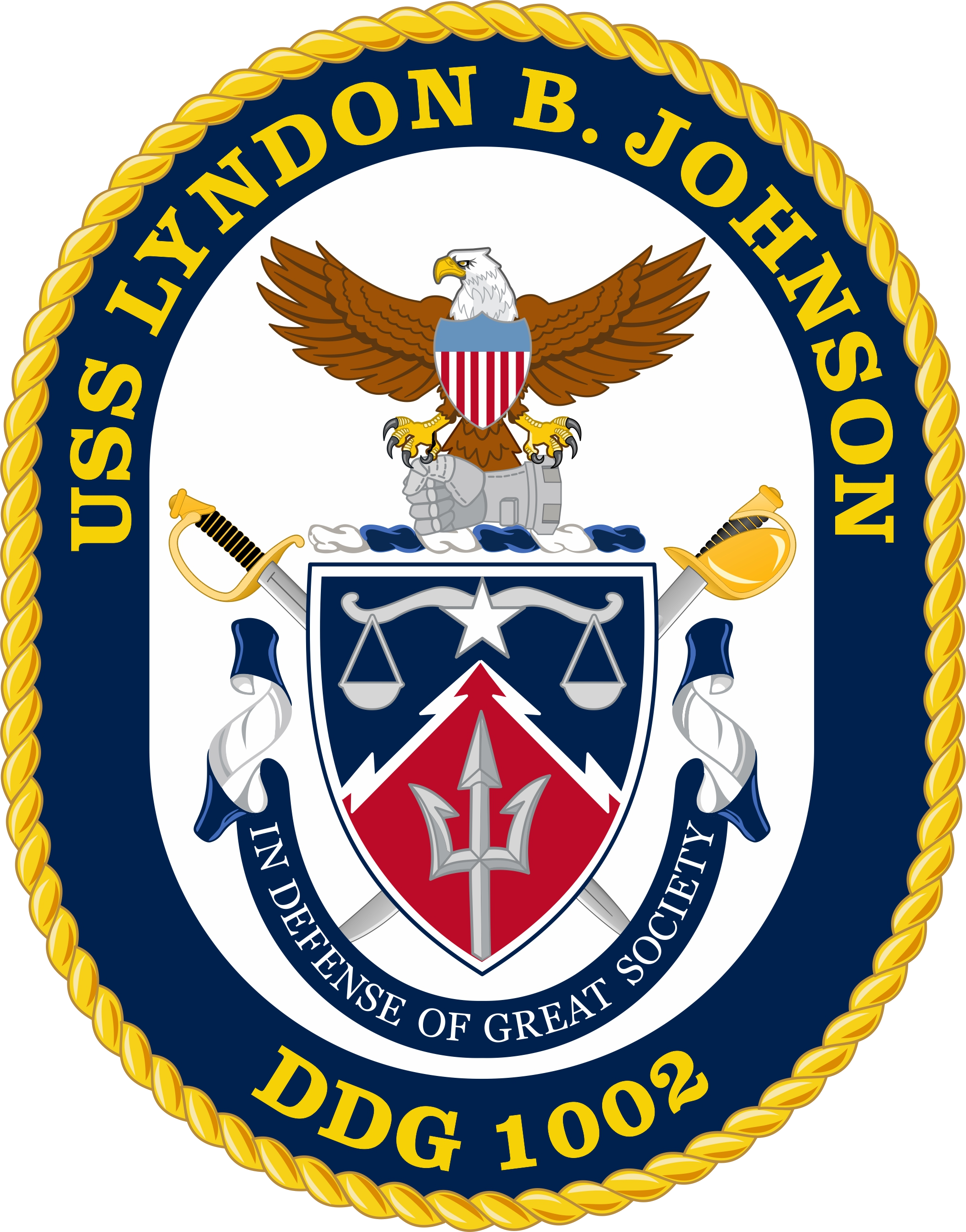
- Badge

General characteristics
- Class & type: Zumwalt-class destroyer
- Displacement: 14,564 tons
- Length: 600 ft (182.9 m)
- Beam: 80.7 ft (24.6 m)
- Draft: 27.6 ft (8.4 m)
- Propulsion: 2 Rolls-Royce Marine Trent-30 gas turbines plus 2 Rolls-Royce RR4500 gas turbine generator sets, 78 MW
- Speed: 30.3 knots (56.1 km/h; 34.9 mph)
- Complement: 140
- Sensors & processing systems: AN/SPY-3 Multi-Function Radar (MFR) (X-band, scanned array); Volume Search Radar (VSR) (S-band, scanned array)
- Armament: 20 × MK 57 VLS modules, with 4 vertical launch cells in each module, 80 cells total. Each cell can hold one or more missiles, depending on the size of the missiles.; Evolved Sea Sparrow Missile (ESSM); Tactical Tomahawk Vertical Launch Anti-Submarine Rocket (ASROC); 2 × 155 mm Advanced Gun System, with a 920 round magazine. Unusable, no ammunition; 2 × Mk 46 Mod 2 Gun Weapon System
- Aircraft carried: 2 × SH-60 LAMPS helicopters or; 1 × MH-60R helicopter; 3 × MQ-8 Fire Scout VTUAV
- Aviation facilities: Hangar Bay, large Helipad

USS Lyndon B. Johnson (DDG-1002) is the third and final Zumwalt-class destroyer built for the United States Navy. The contract to build her was awarded to Bath Iron Works located in Bath, Maine, on 15 September 2011. The award, along with funds for the construction of USS Michael Monsoor, was worth US$1.826 billion. On 16 April 2012, Secretary of the Navy Ray Mabus announced the ship would be named Lyndon B. Johnson in honor of Lyndon B. Johnson, who served as the 36th President of the United States from 1963 to 1969. Johnson served in the Navy during World War II, when he was awarded the Silver Star, and ultimately reached the U.S. Naval Reserve rank of commander. DDG-1002 is the 34th ship named by the Navy after a U.S. president.

== History ==
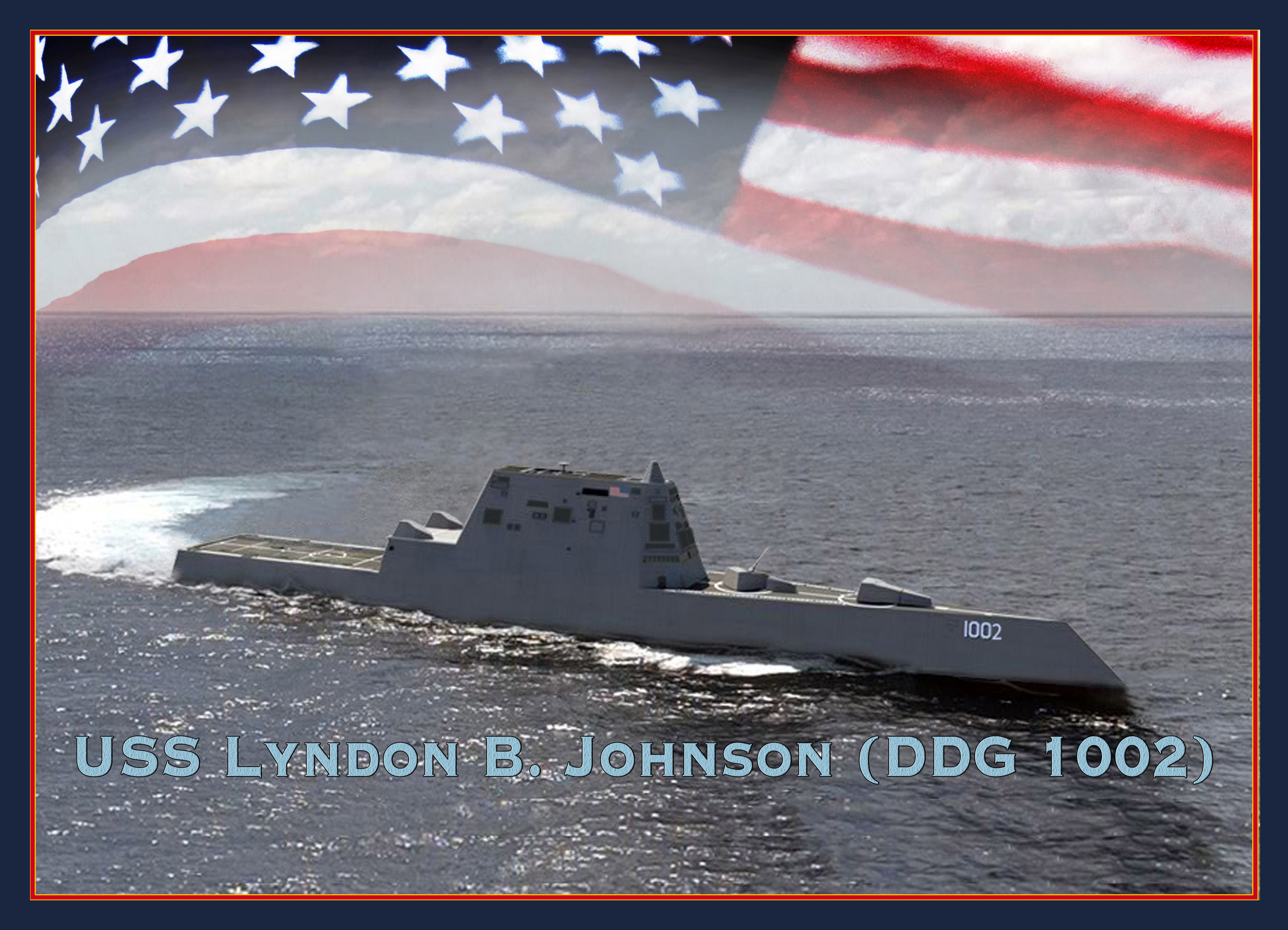
Conceptual image

Lyndon B. Johnson will be a Zumwalt-class destroyer. Although 32 ships were originally planned for that class of ship, the U.S. Navy eventually reduced this number to three units. Designed as multi-mission ships with an emphasis on land attack and littoral warfare, the class features the tumblehome hull form, reminiscent of ironclad warships. In January 2013, the Navy solicited bids for a steel deckhouse as an option for Lyndon B. Johnson instead of the composite structures of the other ships in the class. This change was made in response to cost overruns for the composite structure, but due to the tight weight margins in the class, this required weight savings in other parts of the ship.

In February 2015, the Navy revealed they had begun engineering studies to include an electromagnetic railgun on Lyndon B. Johnson. The Zumwalt class has been identified as more suited to use emerging technologies, like railguns, due to its superior electricity generation capability over previous destroyers and cruisers at 80 megawatts; Lyndon B. Johnson specifically was being studied because it is the latest of the class, while the previous two ships would be less likely to initially field the capability due to the testing schedule. The railgun would likely replace one of the two Advanced Gun Systems. By March 2016, construction had become too far along to install the railgun during building, although it still could be added later. However, in 2022 the Navy stopped railgun development altogether, rendering such installation highly unlikely in the near future.

In September 2015, it was reported that U.S. Department of Defense officials were considering terminating funding for Lyndon B. Johnson prior to her completion. Although considered as a cost-saving measure, cancelling the third Zumwalt ship at that stage was likely not possible, and might have ended up actually costing more after paying program shutdown costs and contract termination penalties. By December 2015, the Pentagon had decided in favor of keeping the ship.

The ship's two AGSs can only fire the LRLAP round. LRLAP procurement was cancelled in 2016, and the Navy has no plan to replace it. As such, the guns cannot be used and the ship cannot provide naval gunfire support. The Navy has re-purposed the Zumwalt class to surface warfare.

The ceremonial keel laying of Lyndon B. Johnson took place on 30 January 2017, by which time construction of the ship was over half finished. The ship was launched in Bath, Maine, on 9 December 2018, and christened on 27 April 2019, by Johnson's daughters, Luci and Lynda.

On 12 January 2022, the ship left Bath for Ingalls Shipbuilding in Pascagoula, Mississippi for combat systems activation, with entry into service reportedly expected in 2024. The Navy subsequently chose to retrofit the prompt strike hypersonic missile onto Lyndon B. Johnson prior to her commissioning, and she entered drydock at Ingalls in January 2025 for the work, with commissioning scheduled for 2027. The two AGSs will be removed as part of this modification.
