= Nunn–McCurdy Amendment =

US federal law against defense contract budget overruns

The Nunn–McCurdy Amendment or Nunn–McCurdy Provision, introduced by Senator Sam Nunn and Congressman Dave McCurdy in the United States 1982 Defense Authorization Act and made permanent in 1983, is designed to curtail cost growth in American weapons procurement programs.

It requires notification to the United States Congress if the cost per unit goes more than 25% beyond what was originally estimated and calls for the termination of programs with total cost growth greater than 50%, unless the secretary of defense submits a detailed explanation certifying:

1. the program is essential to national security, that no suitable alternative of lesser cost is available;
2. new estimates of total program costs are reasonable; and
3. management structure is (or has been made) adequate to control costs.

Congress normally regards the explanations from the Secretary of Defense as acceptable. It is unusual for a program to be cancelled as a result of notification, but it has led to many changes to project management.

In 2006, the House of Representatives proposed amending the provision to require a detailed explanation, including information about possible alternatives, at the 15%-cost-growth mark.

== Examples ==
- The Space-Based Infrared System (SBIRS) was affected by the provision in 2002 and again in 2005.
- The US Army's Future Combat Systems was cancelled in 2009 due to cost overruns.
- Marine Corps' Expeditionary Fighting Vehicle vehicle programs was cancelled in 2011 due to cost overruns.
- The US Navy's Zumwalt-class destroyer's production cost increased from a projected $3.15 billion to $5.82 billion per ship, triggering a Nunn–McCurdy Amendment breach and cancellation of further production in 2016.
