= SC-21 (United States) =

Research and development program

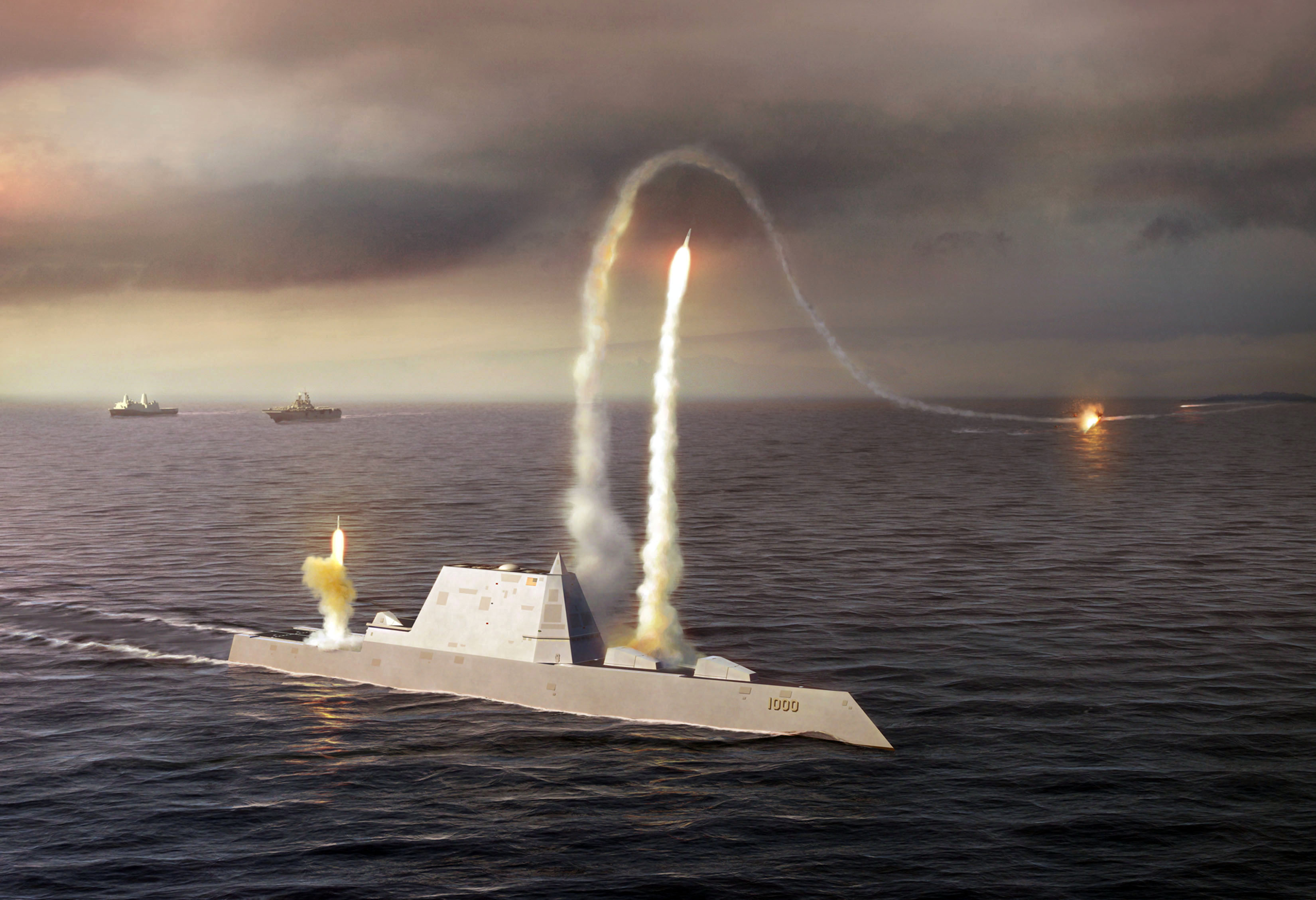
The distinctive hull of the Zumwalt class was derived from the SC-21 program.

SC-21 (Surface Combatant for the 21st century) was a research and development program started in 1994 intended to design land attack ships for the United States Navy. A wide variety of designs were created and extensively examined, including an arsenal ship with 500 cruise missiles. Eventually a "tumblehome" design of around 16,000 tons with two long-range guns and 128 missile tubes was selected as the DD-21, the Destroyer for the 21st century. The program ended in November 2001.

== Background ==
The origins of SC-21 lie in the realization by Admiral Joseph Metcalf III that new technologies such as vertical launch missiles permitted a complete rethink of warship design. He established a steering group, Group Mike, to study the possibilities. Group Mike sponsored two studies in 1987: the Ship Operational Characteristics Study (SOCS) and the Surface Combatant Force Requirement Study (SCFRS). Respectively, these studies sought to identify the operational characteristics required of an escort ship and estimate how many such ships were required by the fleet. Since it was expected at that time that the Navy would be fighting prolonged campaigns in the Norwegian Sea, SOCS put an emphasis on ships' continuing ability to fight after an initial Soviet attack. This in turn called for larger, more survivable escort ships than had historically been the norm, around 12,000 tons, and for networking sensors and weapons together so that they could be used by the task force as a whole even if an individual ship had their radar disabled. Survivability also called for the bridge and Combat Information Center to be combined and "buried" in the heart of the ship, and for the ship to use electric drive to distribute the engineering around the ship. This would provide more room for weapons as well as the scope for future weapons such as railguns and lasers. SCFRS suggested that the Navy should not replace the Oliver Hazard Perry-class frigate for convoy escort duties, but concentrate on building front-line combatants that could be assigned to less demanding convoy duties in their later years.

Both studies reported in 1989, but were almost immediately rendered obsolete by the conclusion of the Cold War. The sudden disappearance of its greatest threat raised the prospect of Navy budget cuts as part of the peace dividend. Interest waned in big new designs like the SOCS ship; the Destroyer Variant (DDV) program of December 1991 was intended as a stopgap, the final development of the Arleigh Burke-class destroyer.

In 1992 the CNO ordered a 21st-century Destroyer (DD-21) Technology Study. This led to a new program called Surface Combatant for the 21st century (SC-21), intended as a family of ships with a range of capabilities that would not necessarily fit old designations of "destroyers" and "cruisers". Meanwhile, strategy papers such as "FORWARD...FROM THE SEA" were redefining the Navy's priorities towards littoral warfare and the support of amphibious assaults inland. It seemed, then, that land attack would be the most important mission for the new ships.

=== Naval fire support role ===
Since the retirement of the Iowa-class battleships, there had been a Congress-mandated requirement relating to the Navy's capability for Naval Fire Support (NFS). The U.S. Marine Corps and the U.S. Navy maintained that destroyers would be adequate in this role, although there are dissenters.

While smaller caliber guns (and missiles) have been used for centuries in naval fire support, very large guns have special capabilities beyond that of medium range calibres. US battleships were re-activated three times after WWII specifically for NFS, and their 16 inch gunfire was used in every major engagement of the U. S. from WWII to the Gulf War. The battleships USS Iowa and USS Wisconsin were finally struck from the Naval Vessel Register in 2006, having been kept on in part to fill a naval fire support role.

== Program approved ==
The SC-21 Mission Need Statement was approved by the Joint Requirements Oversight Council between September–October 1994. The Defense Acquisition Board approved the project on 13 January 1995, allowing the program to proceed to Cost & Operational Effectiveness Analysis (COEA).

== Concept designs ==
The SC-21 COEA had an unusually wide remit, and studied a variety of designs from 2,500 tons to 40,000 tons. There were three main "concepts". Concept 1 looked at possible upgrades to existing vessels, Concept 2 looked at variations of existing designs, and Concept 3 was for new ships :

- 2A : newbuilds of Arleigh Burke Flight IIA
- 2B : further update of the Burke design
- 3A : Power Projection Ship, Aviation Cruiser, Heavy Cruiser – most had 256 VLS cells and amphibious capability
- 3B : Littoral Combatant - Affordable multimission ship with 128 VLS; similar to Improved Spruances
- 3C : Maritime Combatant, Armed Supertanker, Agile Maritime Patrol Ship, Small ASW Combatant, Focused Mission Local Area Combatant - 8-64 VLS
- 3D : Expeditionary Force Support Ship, Tailored Maritime Support Ship and other vessels with modular "mission packs".

Option 3B1 was closest to what became the Zumwalt class, with a pair of 64-cell VLS fore and aft and two standard 5" guns on a conventional flared hull of around 9,400 tonnes. A bigger hull would be required to enclose everything in a stealthy shape, and to accommodate the much bigger AGS gun system.

== Arsenal ship ==
In a separate study in 1993, two French students had been assigned the design of a Large Capacity Missile Ship, a 20,000-tonner with 500 VLS cells filled with land-attack missiles. This design was inspired by a RAND paper in that year, which suggested a land invasion could be halted by destroying 20% of its vehicles with precision munitions. This would take several days with aircraft, but a surface ship with large numbers of land-attack missiles could achieve the same effect almost instantly.

This design was apparently included in the SC-21 assessment as an afterthought - it was not included in the original list of concepts. Two designs were considered, both with 512 VLS cells - Option 3A6 was a minimal version of 13,400 tons with no self-defense capability, Option 3A5 was a 30,000 ton "goal ship" with many more survivability features. The latter Maritime Fire Support Ship became the basis of the Arsenal Ship championed by CNO Jeremy Boorda. In fact he was so enthusiastic that the rest of the SC-21 program was suspended in favor of development of the Arsenal Ship.

The Navy set up a joint venture with DARPA on March 18, 1996. The Arsenal Ship would be acquired as a prototype under DARPA's Other Transaction Authority under Section 845 of the National Defense Authorization Act for FY 1994 (Public Law 103-160), which allowed them to bypass much of the bureaucracy involved with defense procurement, enabling a prototype to be built by the end of 2000. The requirement was for a network-capable ship with around 500 VLS and less than 50 personnel, for a cost of less than $520 m for the lead ship. A further five ships would be acquired at a later date.

In July 1996, five consortia were awarded $1 m to come up with some concepts. Three received follow-on contracts in January 1997, but the Navy had lost enthusiasm for the project with Boorda's suicide in May 1996, and in April 1997 the Arsenal Ship was redesignated as the Maritime Fire Support Demonstrator (MFSD), which would be a technology demonstrator for a revitalised SC-21 program. As a result, Congress cut funding to the project and it was finally canceled in October 1997. The Arsenal Ship concept was revived in 2002 by converting four Ohio-class submarines into SSGNs carrying 154 VLS tubes.

== DD-21 ==
In 1997, plans for the Littoral Combatant (3B1) were revived under the SC-21 banner. It was initially renamed the Power Projection Ship, and then DD-21, Destroyer for the 21st century. Influenced by the Arsenal Ship, it would have a stealthy hull with a significant land attack capability. At first the plan was to install a twin-barreled Vertical Gun for Advanced Ships (VGAS), developed from experiments on advanced projectiles for the Iowa-class battleships, but this was dropped in favour of a conventional 5" gun and two 64-cell VLS. It would also feature a revolutionary cross-layer active sonar. An Operational Requirements Document was signed in November 1997, and an Advanced Development Memorandum on 11 December. A Program Executive Office was established on 25 February 1998. As with the Arleigh Burke-class, the construction of the DD-21 ships would be split between Bath Iron Works and Ingalls Shipbuilding to preserve the industrial base. However, there would be a competition between the two yards to design DD-21 and to be the full-service contractor for the class, which would mean the winning team receiving 85% of the total program costs of around $70 billion. BIW partnered with Lockheed Martin as the combat system designer and integrator, forming the "Blue" team; Ingalls partnered with Raytheon in the "Gold" team.

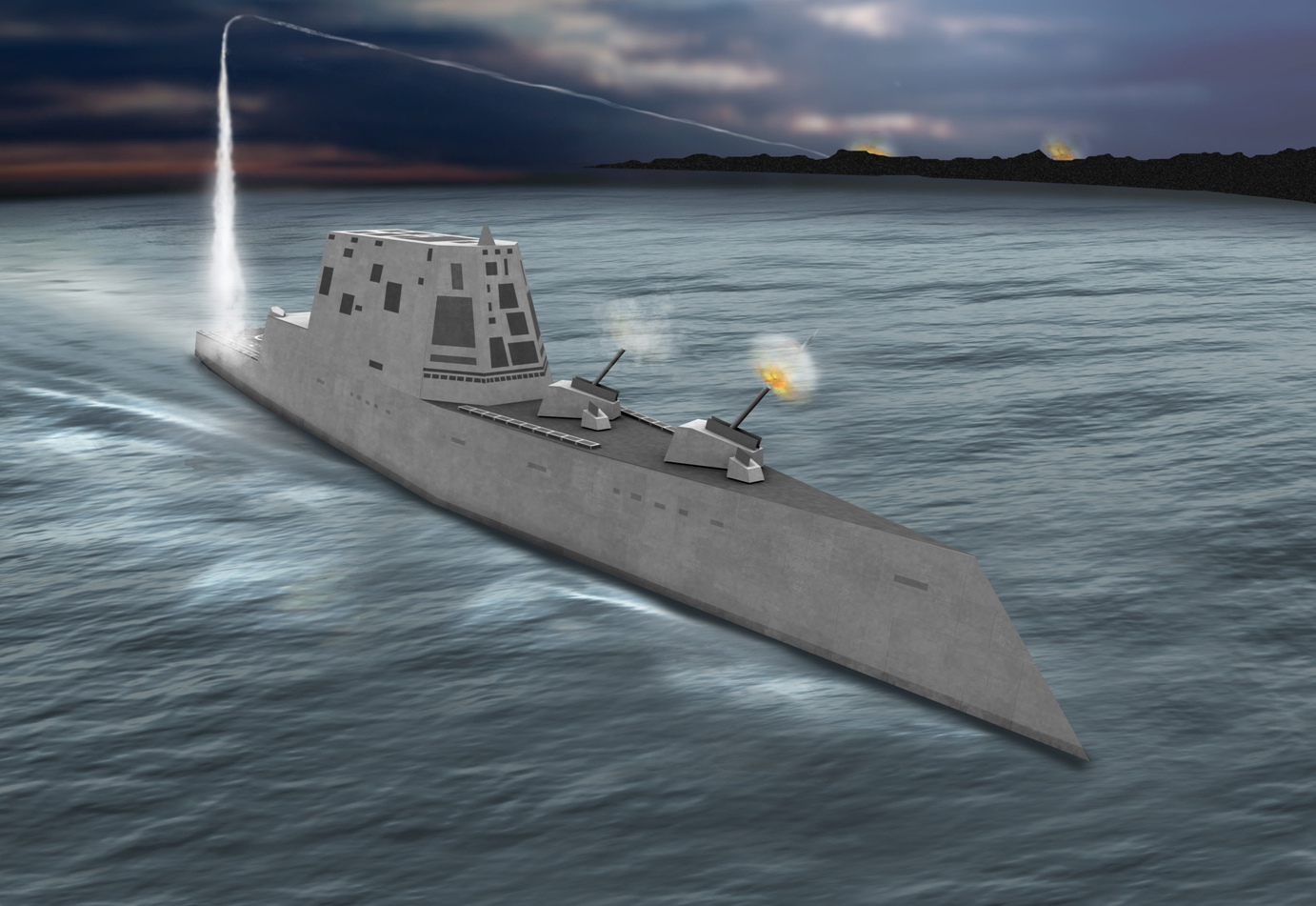
The Zumwalt class tumblehome hull is derived from that of the DD-21

The new design was compared to the current Arleigh Burke hull and possible developments of it, and it was decided to go ahead with a new hull to be called DD-21 (or DD 21), the 21st century Land Attack Destroyer. The new hull was judged to have more potential for stealth and reductions in manning than the Arleigh Burke class. This was important, as one aim of the program was to reduce manning and operational costs by 70%, while providing scope for a follow-on cruiser class. On 4 July 2000 it was announced that the lead ship of the class would be named after Admiral Elmo Zumwalt, who had died earlier that year. The name would be inherited by subsequent versions of the design, culminating in the Zumwalt-class destroyer.

The ship's delivery schedule was delayed by a year following the decision in January 2000 to use electric drive in the ship. But by early 2000 a "tumblehome" design had emerged that resembles that of the eventual Zumwalt class, albeit with differences in the weapons carried. Sources disagree on the displacement of the DD-21, and indeed it probably varied during the design process, but around 16,000 tons seems most likely. As of July 2001, 32 DD-21s were planned, with construction planned to start in FY05.

Many of the weapons planned for the DD-21 were to be trialled in existing ships, increasing the land attack capability of the existing fleet in FY05 before the delivery of DD-21 in FY10. Rocket-boosted Extended Range Guided Munitions (ERGM) for existing 5"/62 guns would have a range of 63 nautical miles (117 km), while the long-range Block IV Tactical Tomahawk missile could be fired from existing Mk 41 vertical launching systems. It was also planned to turn old Standard Missile SAMs into Land Attack Standard Missiles (LASM) with 150 nautical miles (278 km) range.

Initially it was planned to use the Vertical Gun for Advanced Ships (VGAS), but this was abandoned in favor of a more conventional Advanced Gun System fore and aft, each with a separate magazine of 600-750 rounds. The guns would fire a 155 mm version of the ERGM which would double the payload and increase the range to 100 nautical miles (185 km). Together the two guns would give the ship a rate of fire of 24 rounds/minute, giving them the throw weight of two 6-gun 155 mm artillery batteries. Precision munitions make gunfire three times more effective than unguided shells, hence the DD-21 was said to have the destructive power of six batteries. The Navy's goal was to have 256 VLS cells on the DD-21, but the final number may have been 128 - some sketches show missiles being launched from fore and aft but the aft launchers appear to have been replaced by a second gun system and/or a helicopter pad. As well as LASM and Tactical Tomahawk, the DD-21 would receive the Advanced Land Attack Missile (ALAM), a new missile with a variety of warheads and a design range of up to 300 nautical miles (556 km).

== CG-21 ==
A 21st century air defense cruiser (CG-21) was announced in January 2000 to replace the 27 Ticonderoga class cruisers. Procurement was to begin after the end of the DD-21 program, perhaps around 2015. Development work had not started before the program was terminated in November 2001; CG-21 was replaced by the CG(X) program, which was subsequently cancelled in 2010.

== Cancellation ==
The winner of the competition to design the DD-21 was due to be announced in March 2001, but the decision was put back twice as the new Bush administration reviewed defense spending. On March 1 it was announced that the decision would be made in May, and on May 31 it was announced that the Navy would wait for the results of the Quadrennial Defense Review, and a future shipbuilding review. After the House Appropriations Committee proposed a reduction in the DD-21 allocation in the FY2002 budget in late October 2001, on 1 November the Navy announced a less ambitious Future Surface Combatant program (FSC). Polmar claims that DD-21 was terminated primarily for political reasons as the program was closely identified with the Clinton administration, whereas Work views it as the culmination of a debate within the Navy about whether they should use in the littoral zone large capable ships like the DD-21 or more numerous smaller ships like the "Streetfighter" concept. It did not help that the original plan called for the fifth ship to cost $750 m in FY96 dollars, but in the fourth quarter of 1999 alone the program cost went up from $3.2bn to $5.2bn.

Streetfighter evolved into the Littoral Combat Ship; under FSC the DD-21 became the DD(X) which would become the Zumwalt class destroyer, while the preliminary plans for CG-21 would be folded into the CG(X) ballistic missile defense cruiser.

The hull of the Zumwalt class is similar to that of the DD-21, but the new design displaces 14,564 tons and unlike the DD-21, the deckhouse is flush to the sides of the hull. The central "block" of VLS cells is replaced by a peripheral VLS of 80 cells, which allows both guns to be located forward of the deckhouse. This in turn allows the stern to be given over to helicopter facilities but means that the automated magazine can only contain 750 rounds, supplemented by an auxiliary store. The lead ship was finally commissioned in 2016, and the class was truncated to a total of three ships as the Navy's mission changed and the costs increased. The AGS is unusable, as the only munition it can fire, the LRLAP, has been cancelled and there are no plans to replace it.
