= Zumwalt-class destroyer =

Stealth missile destroyer class of the US Navy

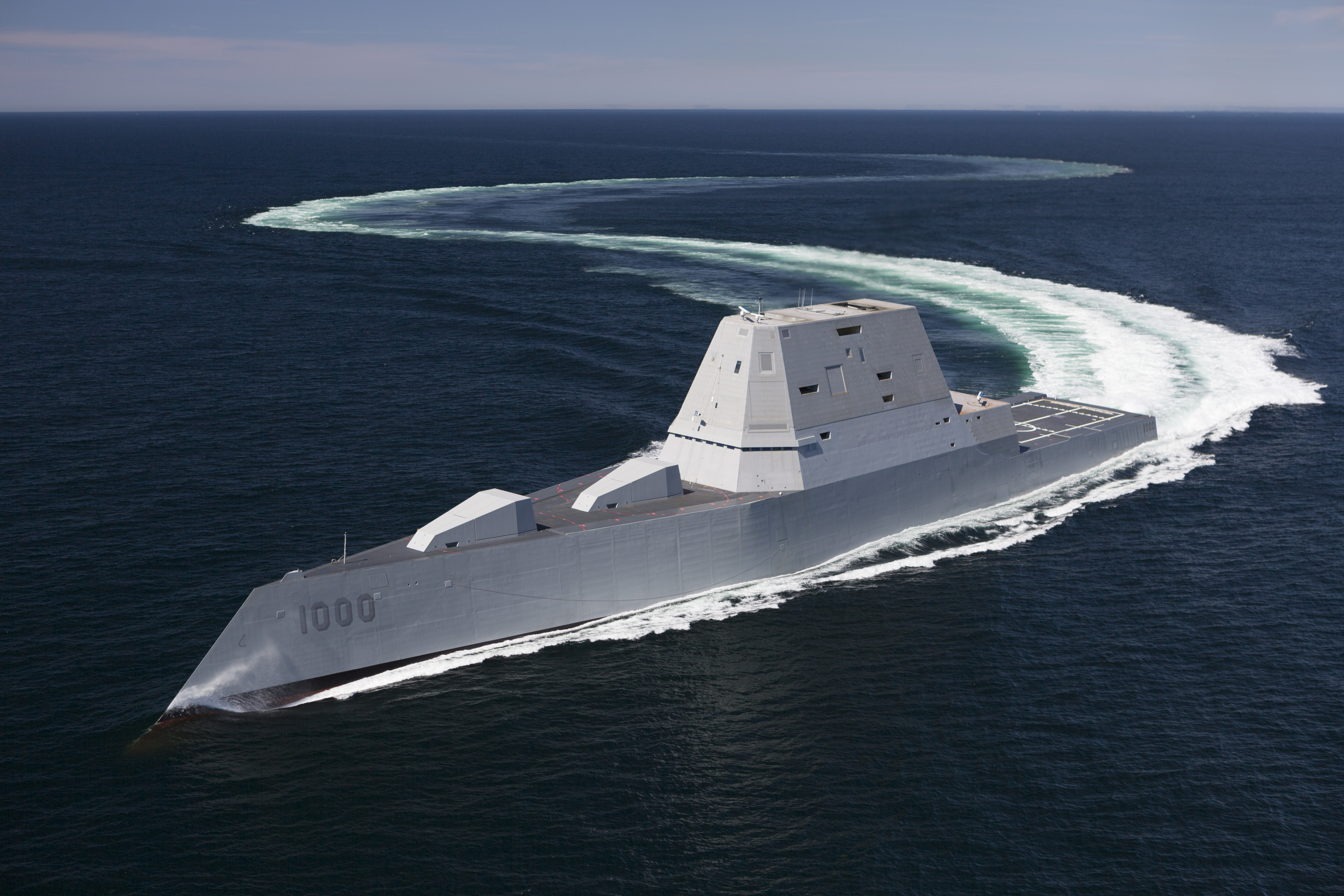
- USS Zumwalt underway in 2016

Class overview
- Name: Zumwalt class
- Builders: Bath Iron Works, Ingalls Shipbuilding
- Operators: United States Navy
- Preceded by: Arleigh Burke class
- Succeeded by: Arleigh Burke class Flight III; DDG(X)
- Cost: $22.5 billion program cost (FY15); $4.24B per unit (excl R&D) as of 2016
- In commission: 15 October 2016
- Planned: 32
- Completed: 3
- Cancelled: 29
- Active: 2

General characteristics
- Type: Large guided-missile destroyer
- Displacement: 15,656 long tons (15,907 t)
- Length: 610 ft (190 m)
- Beam: 80.7 ft (24.6 m)
- Draft: 27.6 ft (8.4 m)
- Installed power: 2 × Rolls-Royce MT30 gas turbines (35.4 MW (47,500 hp) each) driving Curtiss-Wright electric generators; 2 × Rolls-Royce RR4500 turbine generators (3.8 MW (5,100 hp) each)
- Propulsion: 2 × propellers driven by electric motors; Total: 78 MW (105,000 shp)
- Speed: 30 knots (56 km/h; 35 mph)
- Complement: 147 +28 in air detachment
- Sensors & processing systems: AN/SPY-3 Multi-Function Radar (MFR) (X band active electronically scanned array)
- Armament: 20 × Mk 57 VLS modules, 4 cells per module, 80 launch cells total; Each cell can contain: 4 × RIM-162 Evolved SeaSparrow Missiles, 1 × Tomahawk, 1 x SM-6, or; 1 × RUM-139 vertical launch anti-submarine rocket; 2 × 6.1 in (155 mm)/62 caliber Advanced Gun System (functionally inoperable; only a nominal ammunition supply exists) replaced by (12) Conventional Prompt Strike (CPS) Hypersonic Missiles SSMs providing high value target (HVT) Land Attack and Anti-Ship strike capability.; 2 × 1.2 in (30 mm) Mk 46 Mod 2 Gun Weapon System
- Aircraft carried: 1 × MH-60R helicopter; 3 × MQ-8 Fire Scout VT-UAVs
- Aviation facilities: Flight deck and enclosed hangar for up to two medium-lift helicopters

The Zumwalt-class destroyer is a class of three United States Navy large guided-missile destroyers designed as multi-mission stealth ships with a focus on land attack. The class was designed with a primary role of naval gunfire support and secondary roles of surface warfare and anti-aircraft warfare. The class design emerged from the DD-21 "land attack destroyer" program as "DD(X)" and was intended to take the role of battleships in meeting a congressional mandate for naval fire support. The ship was designed around its two Advanced Gun Systems (AGS), utilizing unique Long Range Land Attack Projectile (LRLAP) ammunition. LRLAP procurement was canceled, rendering the guns unusable, so the Navy re-purposed the ships for surface warfare. In 2023, the Navy began removing the AGS from the ships and replaced them with hypersonic missiles.

The ships are classed as destroyers, but they are now the largest surface combatants in the US Navy, much larger than any other active destroyers or cruisers. The vessels' distinctive appearance results from the design requirement for a low radar cross-section (RCS). The Zumwalt class has a wave-piercing tumblehome hull form whose sides slope inward above the waterline, dramatically reducing RCS by returning much less energy than a conventional flare hull form.

The class has an integrated electric propulsion (IEP) system that can send electricity from its turbo-generators to the electric drive motors or weapons, the Total Ship Computing Environment Infrastructure (TSCEI), automated fire-fighting systems, and automated piping rupture isolation. The class is designed to require a smaller crew and to be less expensive to operate than comparable warships.

The lead ship is named Zumwalt for Admiral Elmo Zumwalt and carries the hull number DDG-1000. Originally, 32 ships were planned, with $9.6 billion research and development costs spread across the class. As costs overran estimates, the number was reduced to 24, then to 7; finally, in July 2008, the Navy requested that Congress stop procuring Zumwalts and revert to building more Arleigh Burke destroyers. Only three Zumwalts were ultimately built. The average costs of construction accordingly increased, to $4.24 billion, well exceeding the per-unit cost of a nuclear-powered Virginia-class submarine ($2.688 billion), and with the program's large development costs now attributable to only three ships, rather than the 32 originally planned, the total program cost per ship jumped. In April 2016 the total program cost was $22.5 billion, $7.5 billion per ship. The per-ship increases triggered a Nunn–McCurdy Amendment breach.

== History ==
=== Background and funding ===
Many of the features were developed under the DD-21 program ("21st Century Destroyer"), which was originally designed around the Vertical Gun for Advanced Ships (VGAS). In 2001, Congress cut the DD-21 program by half as part of the SC21 program; to save it, the acquisition program was renamed DD(X) and heavily reworked.

Originally, the Navy had hoped to build 32 destroyers. That number was reduced to 24, then to 7, due to the high cost of new and experimental technologies. On 23 November 2005, the Defense Acquisition Board approved a plan for simultaneous construction of the first two ships at Northrop Grumman's Ingalls yard in Pascagoula, Mississippi, and General Dynamics' Bath Iron Works in Bath, Maine. However, at that date, funding had yet to be authorized by Congress.

In late December 2005, the House and Senate agreed to continue funding the program. The US House of Representatives allotted the Navy only enough money to begin construction on one destroyer as a "technology demonstrator". The initial funding allocation was included in the National Defense Authorization Act of 2007. However, this was increased to two ships by the 2007 appropriations bill approved in September 2006, which allotted US$2.568 billion to the DDG-1000 program.

On 31 July 2008, US Navy acquisition officials told Congress that the service needed to purchase more Arleigh Burke-class destroyers and no longer needed the next-generation DDG-1000 class; only the two approved destroyers would be built. The Navy said the world threat picture had changed in such a way that it made more sense to build at least eight more Burkes rather than DDG-1000s. The Navy concluded from fifteen classified intelligence reports that the DDG-1000s would be vulnerable to forms of missile attacks. Many Congressional subcommittee members questioned that the Navy completed such a sweeping re-evaluation of the world threat picture in just a few weeks, after spending some 13 years and $10 billion on the development of the surface ship program known as DD-21, then DD(X), and finally DDG-1000. Subsequently, Chief of Naval Operations Gary Roughead cited the need to provide area air defense and specific new threats such as ballistic missiles and the possession of anti-ship missiles by groups such as Hezbollah. The mooted structural problems have not been discussed in public. Navy Secretary Donald Winter said on 4 September, "Making certain that we have—I'll just say, a destroyer—in the '09 budget is more important than whether that's a DDG 1000 or a DDG 51".

On 19 August 2008, Secretary Winter said that a third Zumwalt would be built at Bath Iron Works, citing concerns about maintaining shipbuilding capacity. House Defense Appropriations Subcommittee Chairman John Murtha said on 23 September 2008 that he had agreed to partial funding of the third DDG-1000 in the 2009 Defense authorization bill.

Est. combined procurement cost for 3 ships View source data.

A 26 January 2009 memo from John Young, the US Department of Defense's (DoD) top acquisition official, stated that the per ship price for the Zumwalt-class destroyers had reached $5.964 billion, 81 percent over the Navy's original estimate used in proposing the program, resulting in a breach of the Nunn–McCurdy Amendment, requiring the Navy to re-certify and re-justify the program to Congress or to cancel its production.

On 6 April 2009, Defense Secretary Robert Gates announced that the DoD's proposed 2010 budget would end the DDG-1000 program at a maximum of three ships. In April, the Pentagon awarded a fixed-price contract with General Dynamics to build the three destroyers, replacing a cost-plus-fee contract that had been awarded to Northrop Grumman. At that time, the first DDG-1000 destroyer was expected to cost $3.5 billion, the second approximately $2.5 billion, and the third even less.

What had once been seen as the backbone of the Navy's future surface fleet with a planned production run of 32 has since been replaced by destroyer production reverting to the Arleigh Burke class after ordering three Zumwalts. In April 2016, the US Naval Institute stated that the total cost of the three Zumwalt ships is about $22.5 billion with research and development costs, which is an average of $7.5 billion per ship.

=== Construction ===
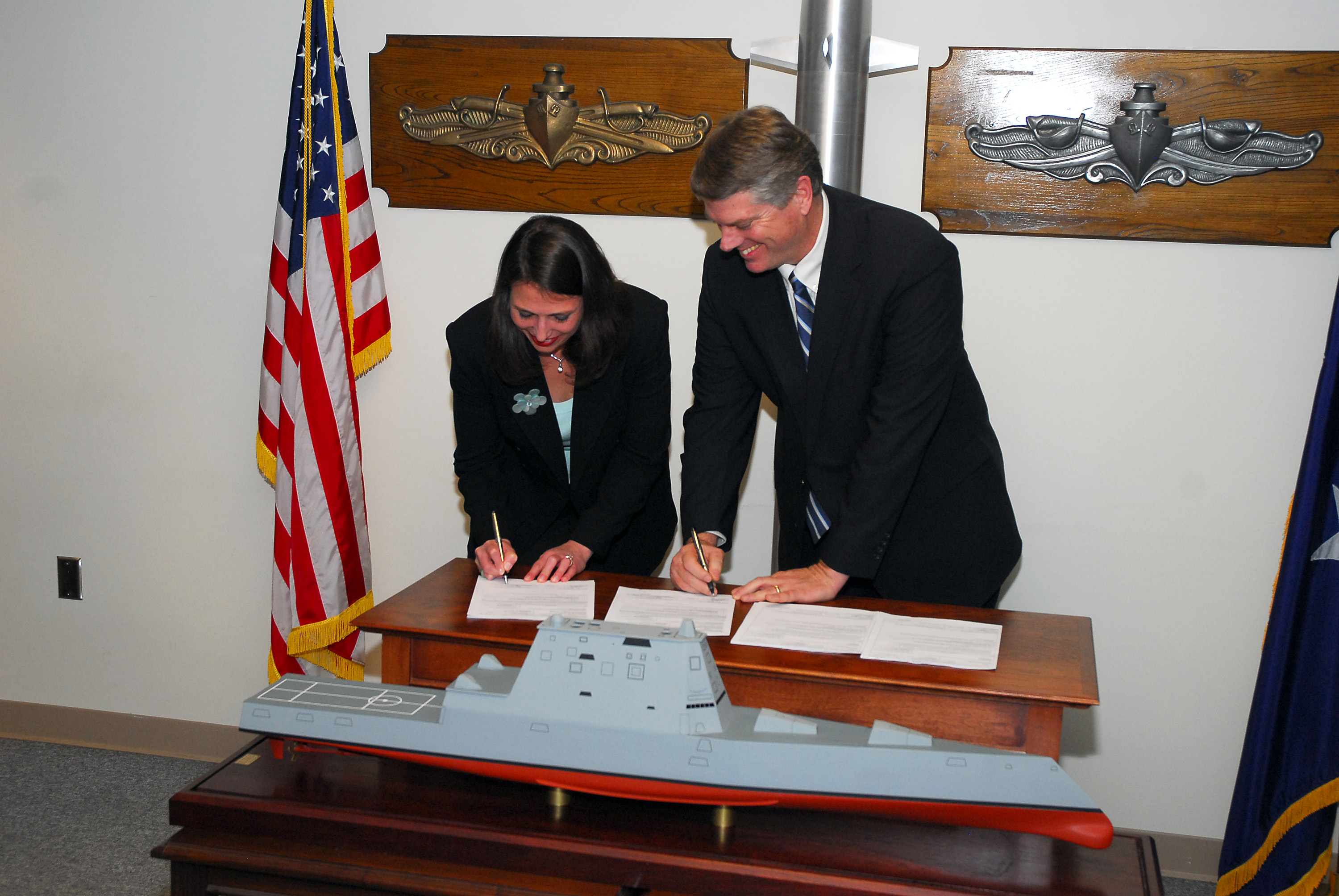
Representatives from Naval Sea Systems Command and Bath Iron Works sign a construction contract at the Pentagon, February 2008.

In late 2005, the program entered the detailed design and integration phase, for which Raytheon was the Mission Systems Integrator. Both Northrop Grumman Ship Systems and General Dynamics Bath Iron Works shared dual-lead for the hull, mechanical, and electrical detailed design. BAE Systems Inc. had the advanced gun system and the Mk 57 Vertical Launching System (VLS). Almost every major defense contractor (including Lockheed Martin, Northrop Grumman Sperry Marine, and L-3 Communications) and subcontractors from nearly every state in the U.S. were involved to some extent in this project, which was the largest single line item in the Navy's budget. During the previous contract, the development and testing of 11 Engineering Development Models (EDMs) took place: Advanced Gun System, Autonomic Fire Suppression System, Dual Band Radar [X-band and L-band], Infrared, Integrated Deckhouse & Apertures, Integrated Power System, Integrated Undersea Warfare, Peripheral Vertical Launch System, Total Ship Computing Environment Infrastructure (TSCEI), Tumblehome Hull Form. The decision in September 2006 to fund two ships meant that one could be built by the Bath Iron Works in Maine and one by Northrop Grumman's Ingalls Shipbuilding in Mississippi.

Northrop Grumman was awarded a $90M contract modification for materials and production planning on 13 November 2007. On 14 February 2008, Bath Iron Works was awarded a contract for the construction of Zumwalt (DDG-1000), and Northrop Grumman Shipbuilding was awarded a contract for the construction of Michael Monsoor (DDG-1001) at a cost of $1.4 billion each.

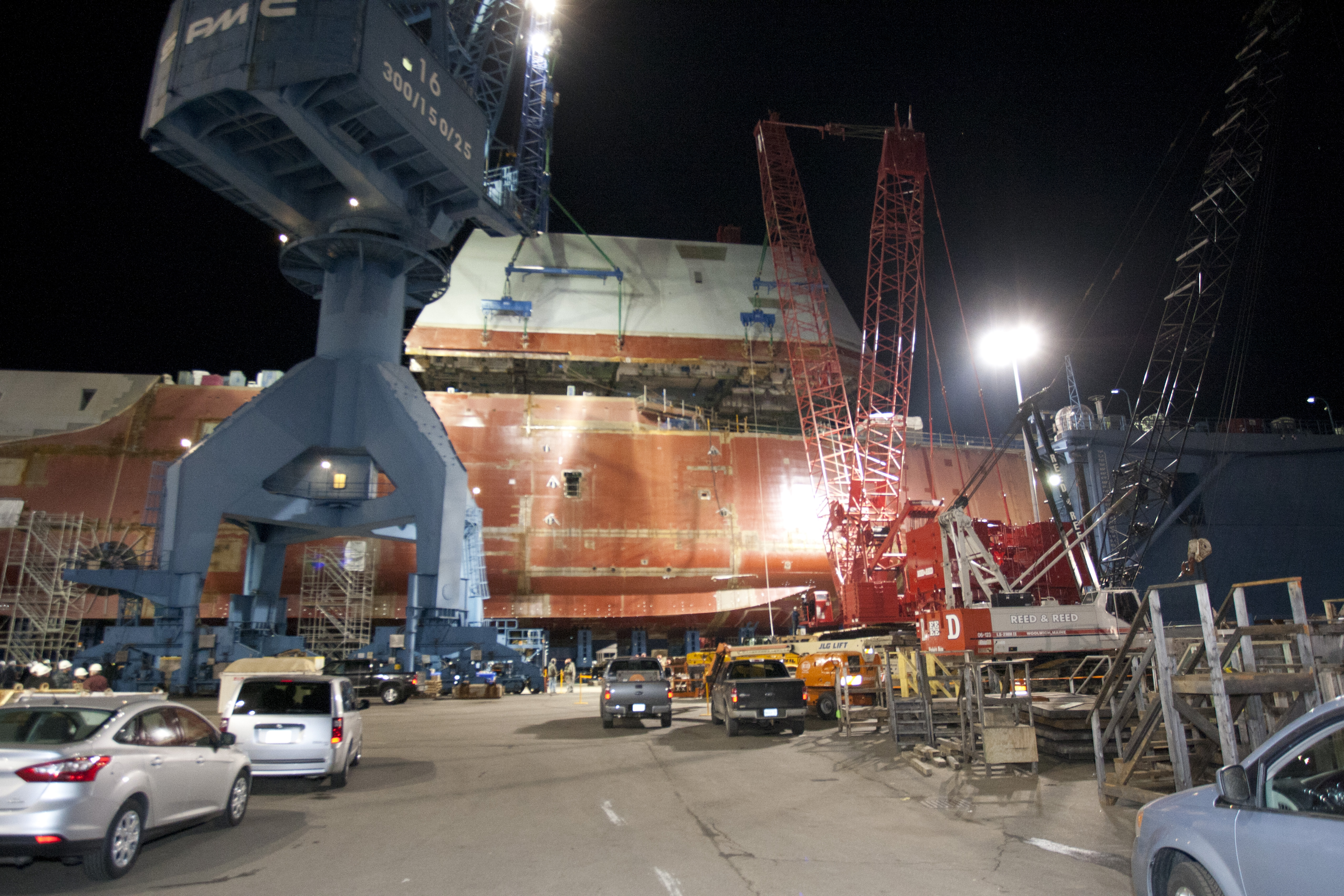
Deckhouse of USS Zumwalt being installed in December 2012

On 11 February 2009, full-rate production officially began on the first Zumwalt-class destroyer. Construction on the second ship of the class, Michael Monsoor, began in March 2010. The keel for the first Zumwalt-class destroyer was laid on 17 November 2011. This first vessel was launched from the shipyard at Bath, Maine, on 29 October 2013.

The construction timetable in July 2008 was:

- October 2008: DDG-1000 starts construction at Bath Iron Works
- September 2009: DDG-1001 starts construction at Bath Iron Works.
- April 2012: DDG-1002 starts construction at Bath Iron Works
- April 2013: DDG-1000 initial delivery
- May 2014: DDG-1001 initial delivery
- March 2015: DDG-1001 Initial operating capability
- December 2018: DDG-1002 initial delivery

The Navy planned for Zumwalt to reach initial operating capability (IOC) in 2016. The second ship, Michael Monsoor, was commissioned in 2019, and the third ship, Lyndon B. Johnson (DDG-1002), was to have reached IOC in 2021.

== Ships in class ==
In April 2006, the Navy announced plans to name the first ship of the class Zumwalt after former Chief of Naval Operations Admiral Elmo R. "Bud" Zumwalt Jr. The vessel's hull number would be DDG-1000, which abandoned the guided-missile destroyer sequence used by the Arleigh Burke class destroyers (DDG-51–) and continued the previous "gun destroyer" sequence from the last of the Spruance class, Hayler (DD-997).

The Navy announced on 29 October 2008 that DDG-1001 would be named for Master-at-Arms 2nd Class Michael A. Monsoor, the second Navy SEAL to receive the Medal of Honor during the Battle of Ramadi (2006) in the Iraq War. Monsoor had deliberately fallen upon a grenade to reduce danger to his SEAL teammates.

On 16 April 2012, Secretary of the Navy Ray Mabus announced that DDG-1002 would be named for former naval officer and U.S. President Lyndon B. Johnson.

The Navy chose to use an unusual two-part commissioning scheme for the ships. The initial commissioning was done prior to weapons systems integration, and the ships were placed in the status of "in commission, special" before sailing to San Diego for weapons installation and final acceptance. The first two ships used this approach, while the last one will use the more traditional approach with formal commissioning after final acceptance.

Ships of the Zumwalt destroyer class
Name	Hull no.	Laid down	Launched	Commissioned	Accepted	Homeport	Status
Zumwalt	DDG-1000	17 November 2011	28 October 2013	15 October 2016	24 April 2020	San Diego, California	Active
Michael Monsoor	DDG-1001	23 May 2013	20 June 2016	26 January 2019	27 August 2024	San Diego, California	Active
Lyndon B. Johnson	DDG-1002	30 January 2017	9 December 2018	Planned for 2027			Under sea trials

== Design ==
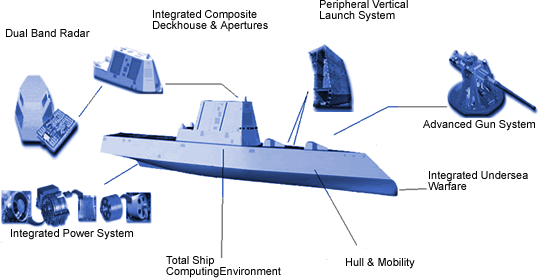
Features of the DDG-1000

In January 2009, the Government Accountability Office (GAO) found that four out of twelve of the critical technologies in the ship's design were fully mature. Six of the critical technologies were "approaching maturity", but five of those would not be fully mature until after installation.

=== Stealth ===
According to a Naval Sea Systems Command spokesman, despite being 40% larger than an Arleigh Burke-class destroyer, the radar cross-section (RCS) is more akin to that of a fishing boat. The tumblehome hull and composite deckhouse reduce radar return. Overall, the destroyer's angular build makes it "50 times harder to spot on radar than an ordinary destroyer."

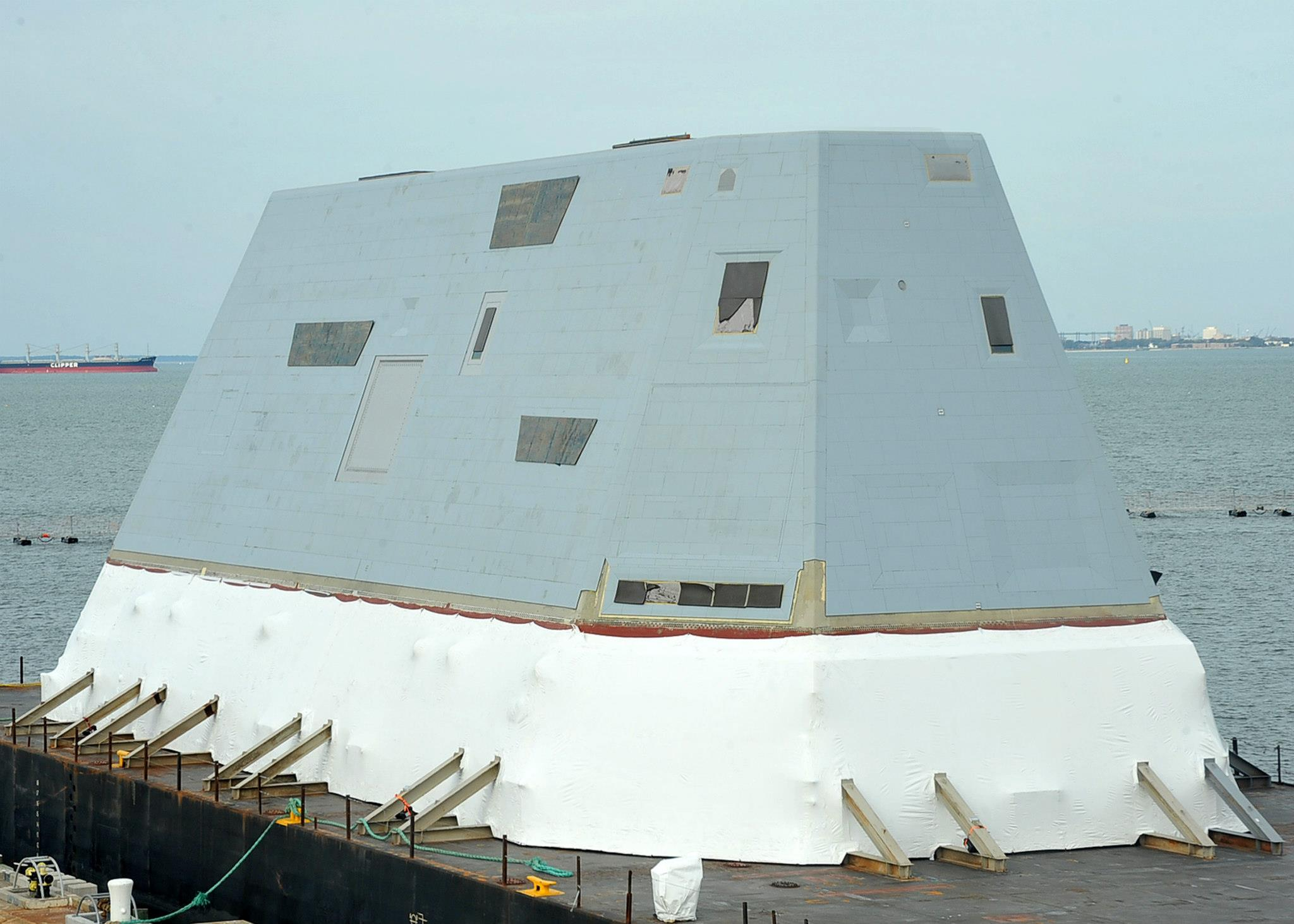
Zumwalt's deckhouse in transit in November 2012

The acoustic signature is comparable to that of the Los Angeles-class submarines. Water sleeting along the sides and passive cool air induction in the mack reduces infrared signature.

The composite deckhouse encloses many of the sensors and electronics. In 2008, Defense News reported there had been problems sealing the composite construction panels of this area; Northrop Grumman denied this.

The U.S. Navy solicited bids for a lower-cost steel deckhouse as an option for DDG-1002, the last Zumwalt destroyer, in January 2013. On 2 August 2013, the U.S. Navy announced it was awarding a $212 million contract to General Dynamics Bath Iron Works to build a steel deckhouse for destroyer Lyndon B. Johnson (DDG-1002). The U.S. Naval Institute stated, "the original design of the ship would have had a much smaller RCS, but cost considerations prompted the Navy over the last several years to make the trades in increasing RCS to save money."

To improve detection in non-combat situations by other vessels, such as traversing busy shipping channels or operating in inclement weather, the Navy is testing adding onboard reflectors to improve the design's radar visibility.

The usefulness of the stealth features has been questioned. The class's role was to provide Naval Surface Fire Support, which requires the ship to be in typically crowded near-shore waters where such large and distinctive ships can be tracked visually, and any surface ship becomes non-stealthy when it begins firing guns or missiles.

=== Tumblehome wave-piercing hull ===
The Zumwalt-class destroyer reintroduces the tumblehome hull form, a hull form not seen to this extent since the Russo-Japanese War in 1905. The appearance has been compared to that of the historic USS Monitor and her famous antagonist CSS Virginia. The hull form was originally put forth in modern steel battleship designs by the French shipyard Forges et Chantiers de la Méditerranée in La Seyne, Toulon. French naval architects believed that tumblehome, in which the beam of the vessel narrowed from the waterline to the upper deck, would create better freeboard, greater seaworthiness, and, as Russian battleships were to find, would be ideal for navigating through narrow constraints (e.g., canals). On the downside, the tumblehome battleships leaked – partly due to their riveted construction – and could be unstable, especially when turning at high speed. The tumblehome has been reintroduced in the 21st century to reduce the radar return of the hull. The inverted bow is designed to cut through waves rather than ride over them. The stability of this hull form in high sea states has caused debate among naval architects, with some charging that "with the waves coming at you from behind, when a ship pitches down, it can lose transverse stability as the stern comes out of the water—and basically roll over."

=== Advanced Gun System ===
The Advanced Gun System is a 6.1 in (155 mm) naval gun, two of which are installed in each ship. This system consists of an advanced 6.1-inch gun and its Long Range Land Attack Projectile (LRLAP). This projectile is a rocket with a warhead fired from the AGS gun; the warhead has an 24-pound (11 kg) bursting charge and has a circular error probable of 160 feet (50 m). This weapon system has a range of 83 nautical miles (154 km). The fully automated storage system has room for up to 750 rounds. The barrel is water-cooled to prevent overheating and allows a rate of fire of 10 rounds per minute per gun. Using a Multiple Rounds Simultaneous Impact (MRSI) firing tactic, the combined firepower from a pair of turrets gives each Zumwalt-class destroyer initial strike firepower equivalent to 12 conventional M198 howitzers. The Zumwalts use ballast tanks to lower themselves into the water for a reduced profile in combat. In November 2016, the Navy moved to cancel procurement of the LRLAP, citing per-shell cost increases to $800,000–$1 million resulting from trimming of total ship numbers of the class. Since the AGS was tailor-made to use the LRLAP, it was unable to fulfill the naval gunfire support role it was designed for.

Lyndon B. Johnson, the last Zumwalt, was being considered for the installation of a railgun in place of one of the 6.1 in (155 mm) naval guns after the ship was built. This would be feasible because the installed Rolls-Royce turbine generators are capable of producing 105,000 horsepower (78 MW), enough for the electrically powered weapon. In 2021, U.S. Navy funding for railgun development ceased with no plans to continue the project. Both guns on all three ships were scheduled to be removed and replaced with hypersonic missiles starting in 2023.

=== Advanced Payload Module ===
In March 2021, the Navy solicited information from the industry on how to reconfigure the Zumwalt-class ships to host Long-Range Hypersonic Weapons (LRHW). Since they would be too large to fit in the VLS tubes, it has been suggested that the two AGS, having no use since the cancellation of their ammunition, could be replaced with three-pack advanced payload modules to fulfill a conventional prompt strike deterrence role. The Navy will request FY 2022 funding to replace the 6.1 in (155 mm) AGS turrets with Advanced Payload Modules for the Conventional Prompt Strike (CPS) hypersonic missile. The conversion would be part of the DDG-1000 Dry-Docking Selected Restricted Availability (DSRA) beginning FY 2024. The LRHW is also slated for Block V Virginia-class attack submarines (SSN). The larger tubes for the VLS will be based upon the Virginia Payload Module (VPM) used in the Virginia SSNs. The first Zumwalt-class destroyer will be ready to test the CPS in 2025. In mid-August 2023 the lead vessel arrived at Pascagoula to have the AGS replaced by the LRHW tubes and the integration of the new weapons system.

=== Peripheral Vertical Launch System ===
The Mk 57 Peripheral Vertical Launch System (PVLS) is a missile launch system designed to avoid intrusions into the prized center space of the hull while reducing the risk of loss of the entire missile battery or the ship in a magazine explosion. The system consists of pods of VLS cells distributed around the ship's outer shell, with a thin steel outer shell and a thick inner shell. The design of the PVLS directs the force of any explosion outward rather than into the ship. Additionally, this design reduces the loss of missile capacity to only the affected pod.

=== Aircraft and boat features ===
Two spots are available on a large aviation deck with a hangar capable of housing two full-size SH-60 helicopters. Boats are handled within a stern-mounted boat hangar with a ramp. The boat hangar's stern location meets high sea state requirements for boat operations.

=== Radar ===
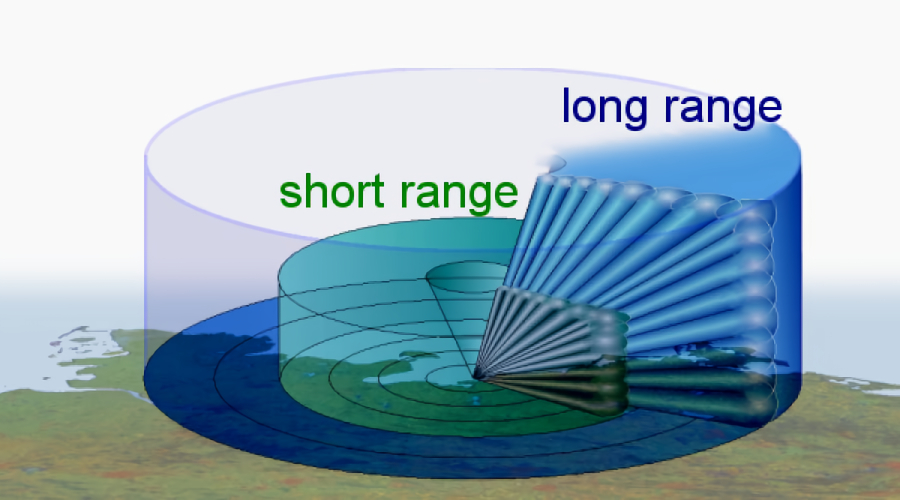
Diagram of AN/SPY-3 vertical electronic pencil beam radar conex projections

Originally, the primarily X band AN/SPY-3 active electronically scanned array radar was to be married with Lockheed Martin's AN/SPY-4 S-band volume search radar. Raytheon's X-band, active-array SPY-3 Multi-Function Radar (MFR) offers superior medium to high altitude performance over other radar bands, and its pencil beams give it an excellent ability to focus on targets. SPY-3 will be the primary radar used for missile engagements. A 2005 report by Congress' investigative arm, the Government Accountability Office (GAO), questioned that the technology leap for the Dual Band Radar would be too much.

On 2 June 2010, Pentagon acquisition chief Ashton Carter announced that they would be removing the SPY-4 S-band Volume Search Radar from the DDG-1000's dual-band radar to reduce costs as part of the Nunn–McCurdy certification process. Due to the SPY-4 removal, the SPY-3 radar will have software modifications for volume search functionality. Shipboard operators will be able to optimize the SPY-3 for either horizon search or volume search. While optimized for volume search, the horizon search capability is limited. The DDG-1000 is still expected to perform local area air defense. This system is thought to provide high detection and excellent anti-jamming capabilities, particularly when used in conjunction with the Cooperative Engagement Capability (CEC). It is, however, not reported if the CEC system will be installed on the Zumwalt-class destroyers upon commissioning, but it is scheduled for eventual incorporation in the ship type.

In that the Zumwalt class has no AN/SPG-62 fire-control radars, which are used for terminal guidance for Standard and Evolved SeaSparrow Missile (ESSM) Block 1 in anti-aircraft engagements, the SPY-3 will generate Interrupted Continuous Wave Illumination (ICWI) rather than the Continuous Wave Illumination of the AN/SPG-62 fire-control radars. Significant software modifications are required to support the ICWI and transmit and receive link messages to the missiles. Standard Missile (SM)-2 IIIA and the ESSM slated for Zumwalt class require modified missile receivers, transmitters, encoders, decoders, and a redesigned digital signal processor to work with the ship's system. These modified missiles will not be able to be used on Aegis class ships.

The SPY-3 had to be reprogrammed to do the volume search that the SPY-4 was supposed to have performed. With the duties of volume and surface search and terminal illumination, there is concern that a large-scale missile attack could overwhelm a radar's resource management capacity. In such a case, the radar may be unable to manage incoming threats properly or guide offensive missiles.

The Dual Band Radar in its entirety (SPY-3 & SPY-4) is to be installed only on the Gerald R. Ford-class aircraft carrier Gerald R. Ford. With the development of the AN/SPY-6 Air and Missile Defense Radar (AMDR), it seems unlikely the DBR will be installed on any other platforms, as it is on the DDG-1000 class, or in total, as it is on Gerald R. Ford. The Enterprise Air Surveillance Radar (EASR) is a new design surveillance radar that is to be installed in the second Gerald R. Ford-class aircraft carrier, John F. Kennedy, instead of the Dual Band radar. The America-class amphibious assault ships starting with LHA-8 and the planned LX(R)-class amphibious warfare ships will also have this radar.

The AN/SPY-6 AMDR was originally proposed to be installed in the hull of DDG-1000 type under the CG(X) program. However, the CG(X) program was canceled due to cost growth. The AMDR has continued in fully funded development for installation on the Arleigh Burke class destroyer Flight III ships, with plans to be also installed on Flight IIA ships. However, a smaller than optimally planned aperture of 14 feet (4.3 m), the AMDR for the Flight III ships is to be less sensitive than the 22 feet (6.7 m) variant that had been planned for CG(X).

A study to place the AN/SPY-6 on a DDG-1000 hull was done with the 22-foot (6.7 m) aperture primarily for Ballistic Missile Defense (BMD) purposes. In that the DDG-1000 does not have an Aegis Combat System, as do the DDG-51 class ships, but rather the Total Ship Computing Environment Infrastructure (TSCEI), the Radar/Hull Study stated:

... that developing a BMD capability "from scratch" for TSCE was not considered viable enough by the study team to warrant further analysis, particularly because of the investment already made in the Aegis program. The navy concluded that developing IAMD software and hardware specifically for TSCE would be more expensive and present higher risk. Ultimately, the navy determined that Aegis was its preferred combat system option. Navy officials stated that Aegis had proven some BMD capability and was widely used across the fleet, and that the navy wanted to leverage the investments it had made over the years in this combat system, especially in its current development of a version that provides a new, limited IAMD capability.

=== Common Display System ===
The ship's Common Display System is nicknamed "keds": Sailors operate keds via trackballs and specialized button panels, with touchscreens option to the interface. The technology array allows sailors to monitor multiple weapons systems or sensors, saving manpower, and allowing it to be steered from the ops center.

=== Sonar ===
A dual-band sonar controlled by a highly automated computer system will be used to detect mines and submarines. It is claimed that it is superior to the Arleigh Burke class's sonar in littoral ASW but less effective in blue water/deep sea areas.

- Hull-mounted mid-frequency sonar (AN/SQS-60)
- Hull-mounted high-frequency sonar (AN/SQS-61)
- Multi-function towed array sonar and handling system (AN/SQR-20)

Although Zumwalt ships have an integrated suite of undersea sensors and a multi-function towed array, they are not equipped with onboard torpedo tubes, so they rely on their helicopters or VL-ASROCs to destroy submarines that the sonar picks up.

=== Propulsion and power system ===
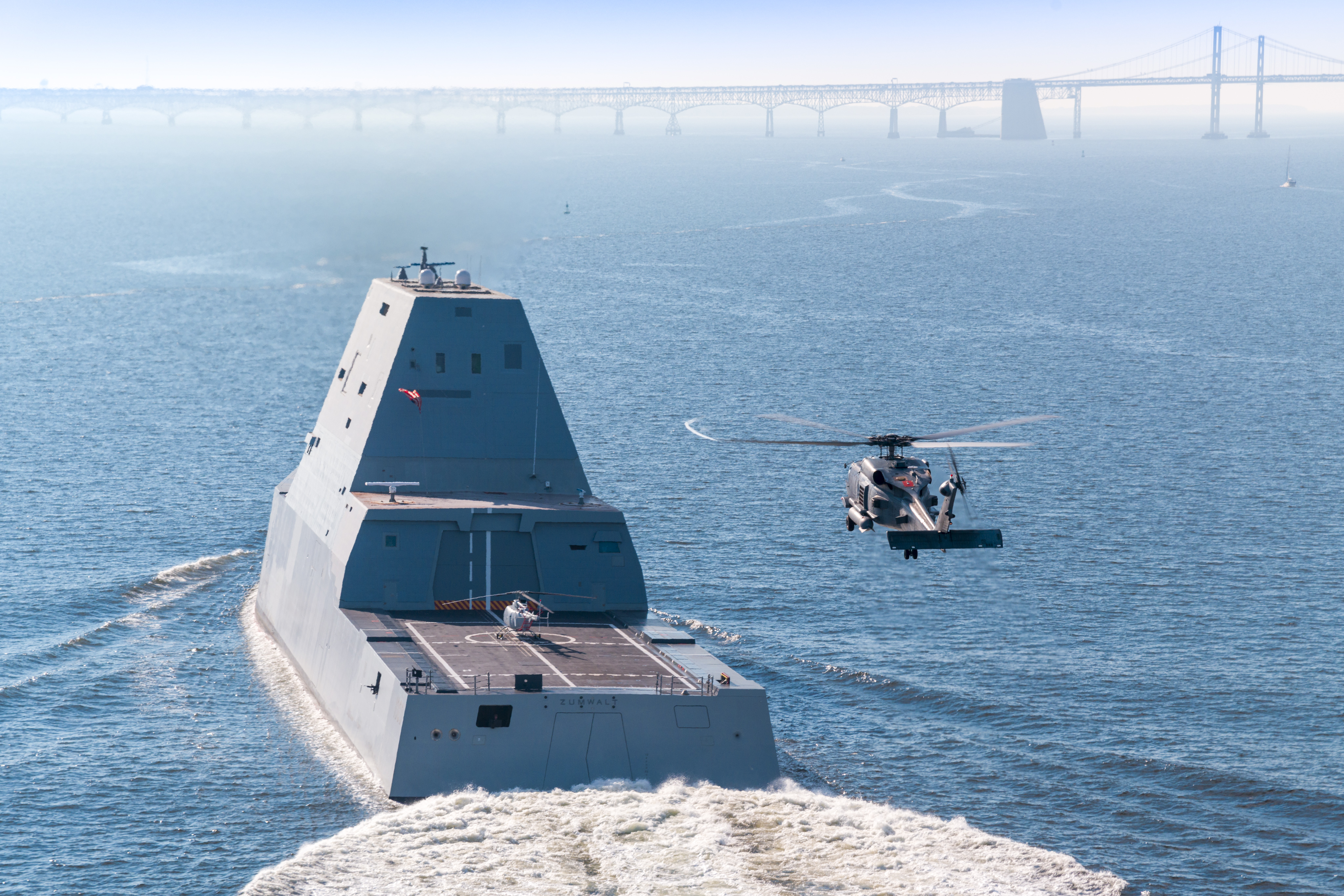
View of the stern of USS Zumwalt, 2016

Zumwalt-class ships use an Integrated Power System (IPS), a modern version of a turbo-electric drive system. The IPS is a dual system, with each half consisting of a gas turbine prime mover directly coupled to an electrical generator, providing power for an electric motor that drives a propeller shaft. The system is "integrated" because the turbo-generators provide electrical power for all ship systems, not just the drive motors. The system provides much more available electrical power than is available in other types of ships.

The DDX proposed using permanent-magnet motors (PMMs) within the hull, which was abandoned in favor of a more conventional induction motor. An alternate twin pod arrangement was rejected as the ramifications of pod drives would require too much development and validation cost to the vessel. The PMM was considered to be another technology leap and was the cause of some concern (along with the radar system) from Congress. As part of the design phase, Northrop Grumman had the world's largest permanent magnet motor designed and fabricated by DRS Technologies. This proposal was dropped when the PMM motor failed to demonstrate that it was ready to be installed in time.

Zumwalt has Converteam's Advanced Induction Motors (AIM) rather than DRS Technologies' Permanent Magnet-Synchronous Motors (PMM).

The exact choice of engine systems remains somewhat controversial. The original concept called for an Integrated Power System (IPS) based on in-hull Permanent Magnet Motors (PMMs), with Advanced Induction Motors (AIM) considered as a backup option. However, in February 2005, the design shifted to the AIM system to meet scheduled milestones. Although the technical issues with PMMs were later resolved, the program had already moved forward with AIM. The drawback of AIM technology is that it uses heavier motors, requires more space, and necessitates the development of a separate controller to meet noise requirements. Additionally, it produces only one-third the voltage. On the other hand, reverting away from AIM at this stage would introduce significant time and cost penalties due to the design and construction changes required to "design AIM out."...

The system reduces the ship's thermal and sound signature. As noted by the GAO, the IPS has added to weight growth in the Zumwalt-class destroyer.

Electric power is provided by two Rolls-Royce MT30 gas turbines (47,500 hp or 35.4 MW each) driving Curtiss-Wright electric generators.

The second ship of the class, Michael Monsoor, will require a new gas turbine after she experienced problems during sea trials resulting in damaged turbine blades.

=== Automation and fire protection ===
Automation reduces crew size on these ships: the Zumwalt-class destroyer's minimum complement is 130, less than half that of similar warships. Smaller crews reduce a significant component of operating costs. Ammunition, food, and other stores are all mounted in containers able to be struck below to magazine/storage areas by an automated cargo handling system.

Water spray or mist systems are proposed for deployment in the Zumwalt-class destroyer, but the electronic spaces remain problematic to the designers. Halon/nitrogen dump systems are preferred but do not work when space has been compromised by a hull breach. The GAO has noted this system as a potential problem yet to be addressed.

=== Computer network ===
The Total Ship Computing Environment Infrastructure (TSCEI) is based on General Electric Fanuc Embedded Systems' PPC7A and PPC7D single-board computers running LynuxWorks' LynxOS Real-time operating system (RTOS). These are contained in 16 shock, vibration, and electromagnetic protected Electronic Modular Enclosures. Zumwalt carries 16 pre-assembled IBM blade servers. The network allows seamless integration of all onboard systems, e.g., sensor fusion and easing operation and mission planning.

== Criticism ==
An April 2018 GAO report said the total cost of the three Zumwalt destroyers, including research and development, was $24.5 billion—an average of about $8 billion per ship.

Lawmakers and others questioned whether the Zumwalt class costs too much and whether it provides the capabilities that the military needs. In 2005, the Congressional Budget Office estimated the acquisition cost of a DD(X) at $3.8 billion to $4 billion in 2007 dollars, $1.1 billion more than the Navy's estimate. The National Defense Authorization Act For the Fiscal Year 2007 (Report of the Committee on Armed Services House of Representatives on H.R. 5122 Together With Additional And Dissenting Views) stated:

The committee understands there is no prospect of being able to design and build the two lead ships for the $6.6 billion budgeted. The committee is concerned that the navy is attempting to insert too much capability into a single platform. As a result, the DD(X) is now expected to displace more than 14,000 tons and by the navy's estimate, cost almost $3.3 billion each. Originally, the Navy proposed building 32 next generation destroyers, reduced that to 24, then finally to 7 in order to make the program affordable. In such small numbers, the committee struggles to see how the original requirements for the next generation destroyer, for example providing naval surface fire support, can be met.

Mike Fredenburg analyzed the program for National Review after Zumwalt broke down in the Panama Canal in November 2016. He concluded that the ship's problems "are emblematic of a defense procurement system that is rapidly losing its ability to meet our national security needs." Fredenburg went on to detail problems relating to the skyrocketing costs, lack of accountability, unrealistic goals, a flawed concept of operations, the perils of designing a warship around stealth, and the failure of the Advanced Gun System. He concludes:

The Zumwalt is an unmitigated disaster. Clearly it is not a good fit as a frontline warship. With its guns neutered, its role as a primary anti-submarine-warfare asset in question, its anti-air-warfare capabilities inferior to those of our current workhorse, the Arleigh Burke-class destroyers, and its stealth not nearly as advantageous as advertised, the Zumwalt seems to be a ship without a mission.

=== Ballistic missile/air defense capability ===
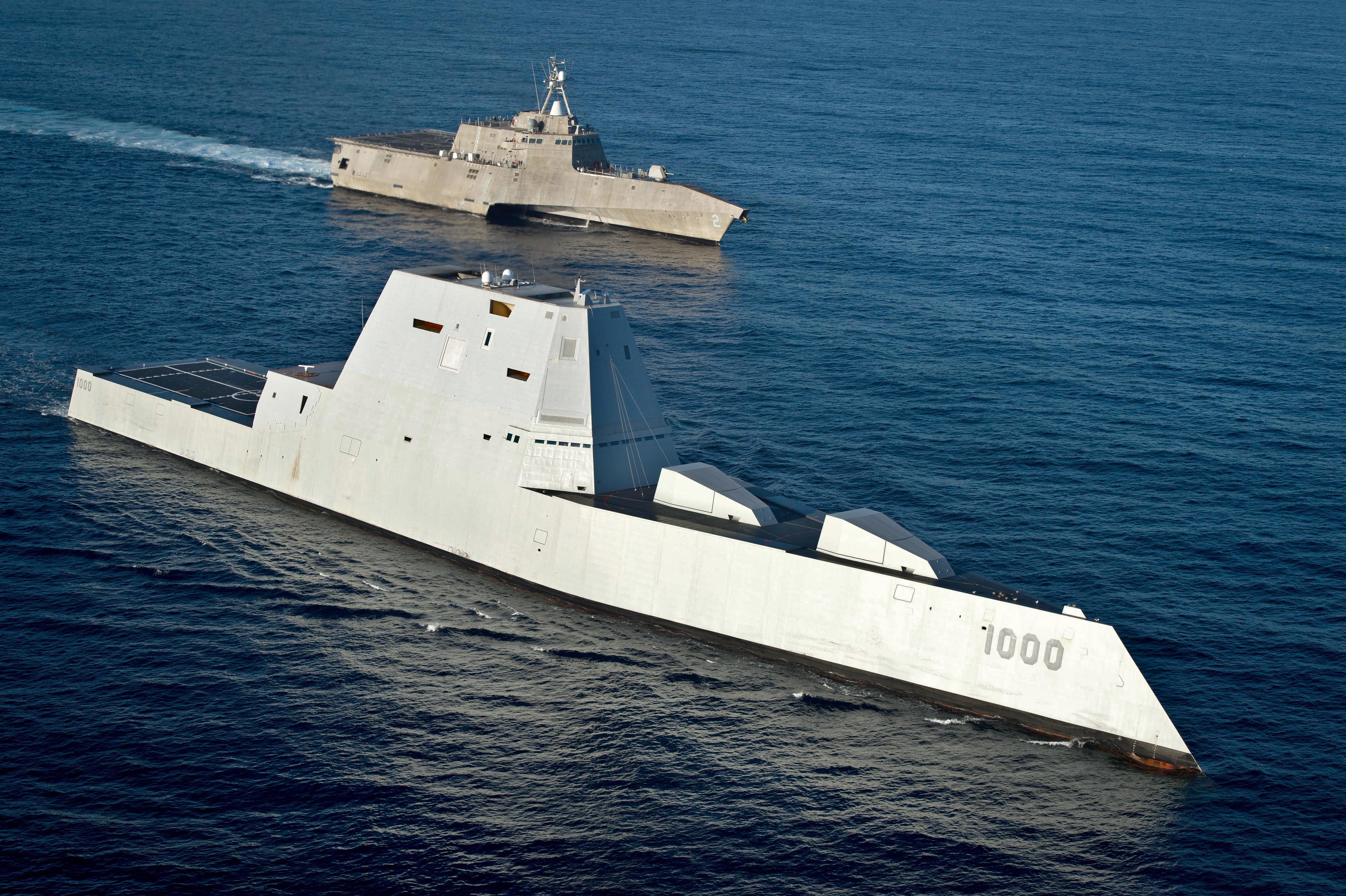
USS Zumwalt sailing alongside the littoral combat ship USS Independence in 2016

In January 2005, John Young, Assistant Secretary of the Navy for Research, Development, and Acquisition, was so confident of the DD(X)'s improved air defense over the Arleigh Burke class that between its new radar and ability to fire SM-1, SM-2, and SM-6, "I don't see as much urgency for [moving to] CG(X)" – a dedicated air defense cruiser.

On 31 July 2008, VADM Barry McCullough (DCNO for Integration of Resources and Capabilities) and Allison Stiller (DASN for Ship Programs) assessed that DDG 1000 lacks area air defense capability. The platform cannot effectively employ SM-2, SM-3, or SM-6 and is not capable of conducting ballistic missile defense (BMD)." Dan Smith, president of Raytheon's Integrated Defense Systems division, has countered that the radar and combat system are essentially the same as other SM-2-capable ships, "I can't answer the question as to why the Navy is now asserting ... that Zumwalt is not equipped with an SM-2 capability". The lack of anti-ballistic missile capability may represent a lack of compatibility with SM-2/SM-3. The Arleigh Burke-class ships have BMD systems with their Lockheed-Martin AEGIS tracking and targeting software, unlike the DDG-1000's Raytheon TSCE-I targeting and tracking software, which does not, as it is not yet complete, so while the DDG-1000, with its TSCE-I combat system, does have the SM-2/SM-3 missile system installed, it does not yet have the BMD/IAMD upgrade planned for the derived CG(X). The Aegis system, on the other hand, was used in the Aegis Ballistic Missile Defense System. Since Aegis has been the Navy's chief combat system for the past 30 years, when the Navy started a BMD program, the combat system it was tested on was the Aegis combat system. So while the DDG-51 platform and the DDG-1000 platform are both SM-2/SM-3 capable, as a legacy of the Aegis Ballistic Missile Defense System, only the DDG-51 with the Aegis combat system is BMD capable. However, the DDG-1000's TSCE-I combat system had both BMD and IAMD upgrades planned. Combined with recent intelligence that China is developing targetable anti-ship ballistic missiles based on the DF-21, this may be considered a fatal flaw.

On 22 February 2009, James "Ace" Lyons, the former commander in chief of the U.S. Pacific Fleet, stated that the DDG-1000's technology was essential to a future "boost phase anti-ballistic missile intercept capability."

In 2010, the Congressional Research Service reported that the DDG-1000 could not currently be used for BMD because the BMD role was deferred to the DDG-1000 derived CG(X) program (the DDGs had the strike role, the CG had the BMD role, but they shared both the SM3 missile and the TSCE-I), the proposed radar of the CG(X) was much larger (22') and used much more energy and cooling capacity than the DDG-1000's. Since then, the 22-foot (6.7 m) radar system has been canceled with the CG(X), and it has been determined that a 14-foot (4.3 m) radar could be used either on DDG 51-or DDG-1000, though it would not have the performance the Navy predicts would be needed "to address the most challenging threats". Were the CG(X)'s BMD requirement adopted by the DDG-1000, the DDG-1000 would have to get the TSCE-I upgrade slated for the CG(X) to support that mission.

The analysis supporting a cost advantage for constructing Flight III Arleigh Burke-class destroyers with enhanced radar systems, rather than integrating BMD capability into Zumwalt-class destroyers, assumed minimal modifications between Flight II and Flight III variants. However, projected costs for Flight III have increased significantly as requirements and performance expectations have expanded. While the Flight III design and costs have been studied by the Navy, there is very little reliable data available on the cost of modifying a DDG-1000–class ship to provide a BMD capability. However, if the Air Missile Defense Radar is adopted in common on both the Flight III Burkes and the Zumwalts, and if they were both upgraded to the same combat system, then the only limitation of the Zumwalts in this role would be their limited missile magazines.

With the awarding of the development contract to the next generation Air and Missile Defense S-Band Radar to Raytheon, deliberation to put this radar on the Zumwalt-class destroyer is no longer being actively discussed.

It is possible for the Zumwalt-class destroyers to get the more limited BMD hardware and software modifications that would allow them to use their existing SPY-3 radar and Cooperative Engagement Capability to utilize the SM-3 missile and have a BMD capability similar to the BMD-capable Ticonderoga-class cruisers and Arleigh Burke-class Flight IIA destroyers. Procurement of a BMD-specific version of the Zumwalt-class destroyer was also proposed.

Zumwalt Peripheral Vertical Launch System (PVLS) cells are capable of launching the SM-2 Standard Missile; however, the platform has no ballistic missile defense (BMD) requirement. The launch cells are sized to accommodate future interceptor variants. While the ship was designed primarily for littoral dominance and land-attack missions, Raytheon has assessed that BMD capability could be integrated with minimal modifications.

=== Missile capacity ===
The original DD-21 design would have accommodated between 117 and 128 VLS cells. However, the final DDG-1000 design provides only 80 cells. Zumwalt uses Mk 57 Peripheral Vertical Launching System (PVLS) cells, which are larger than the Mk 41 cells found on most American destroyers.

Each VLS cell can be quad packed with RIM-162 Evolved SeaSparrow Missiles (ESSM). This gives a maximum theoretical load of 320 ESSM missiles. The ESSM is considered a point defense weapon not generally used for fleet area defense.

The Zumwalt-class destroyer is not an Aegis system. It instead uses the class-unique Total Ship Computing Environment Infrastructure (TSCEI) integrated mission system. The Mk 57 PVLS is capable of accommodating all Standard missile types. It has not been publicly stated if the TSCE will be modified to support the Standard missile or the ballistic missile defense mission.

=== Naval fire support role ===
The design concept for the Zumwalt class developed from the "Land Attack Destroyer (DD 21)" development effort. A primary goal for DD 21 was to provide sea-based fire support for on-shore troops as part of the force mix that would replace the retiring Iowa-class battleships as mandated by Congress. There was considerable skepticism that the Zumwalt class could succeed in this role.

In summary, the committee is concerned that the navy has foregone the long range fire support capability of the battleship, has given little cause for optimism with regard to meeting near-term developmental objectives, and appears unrealistic in planning to support expeditionary warfare in the mid-term. The committee views the navy's strategy for providing naval surface fire support as 'high risk', and will continue to monitor progress accordingly.

— Evaluation of the United States Navy's naval surface fire support program in the National Defense Authorization Act of 2007,

The Zumwalt class was intended to provide naval surface fire support (NSFS) using the AGS and additional land attack using Tomahawk missiles from its PVLS launchers. As deployed, the Zumwalt class cannot provide NSFS since there are only 90 rounds of ammunition available that are compatible with the AGS in total. The Zumwalt class were re-purposed as surface attack vessels and are no longer intended for use as land attack destroyers.

=== Tumblehome design stability ===
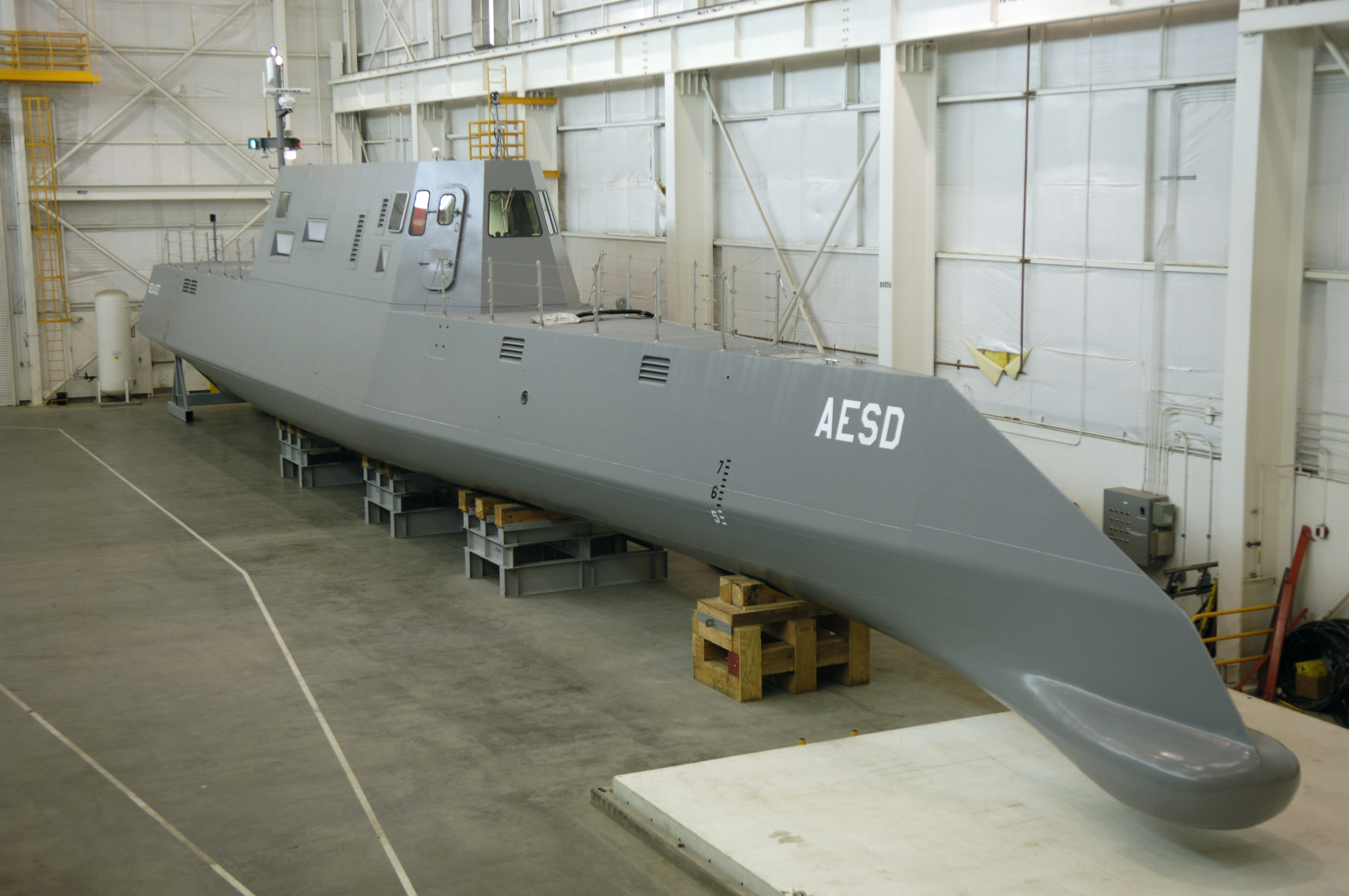
Sea Jet out of the water and showing the unique hull design

The stability of the DDG-1000 hull design in heavy seas has been a matter of controversy. In April 2007, naval architect Ken Brower said, "As a ship pitches and heaves at sea, if you have tumblehome instead of a flare, you have no righting energy to make the ship come back up. On the DDG-1000, with the waves coming at you from behind, when a ship pitches down, it can lose transverse stability as the stern comes out of the water – and basically, roll over." The Navy had decided not to use a tumblehome hull in the CG(X) cruiser before the program was canceled, which may suggest that there were concerns regarding Zumwalt's seakeeping abilities. The tumblehome hull, however, proved seaworthy in a 1/4-scale test of the hull design named Sea Jet.

Sea Jet, funded by the Office of Naval Research (ONR), is a 133-foot (40-meter) vessel located at the Naval Surface Warfare Center Carderock Division, Acoustic Research Detachment in Bayview, Idaho. Sea Jet was operated on Lake Pend Oreille, where it was used to test and demonstrate various technologies. Among the first technologies tested was an underwater discharge waterjet from Rolls-Royce Naval Marine, Inc. called AWJ-21.

While underway during the spring of 2019, USS Zumwalt sailed through a storm causing sea state six, with a maximum wave height between 13 and 20 feet (4 and 6 m), off the coast of Alaska. The test indicated that the Zumwalt class possesses greater stability compared to typical hull forms. During an interview, Captain Andrew Carlson, the commanding officer of USS Zumwalt at the time, related, "All told I'd rather be on that ship than any other ship I've been on." According to Captain Carlson, during the storm, he summoned his executive officer from his cabin to inform him of the sea state six conditions. Based on the rolls he had been experiencing in his cabin, the executive officer thought that, at most, they were at sea state three, where wave height only reaches a maximum of 4 feet (1.2 m). A combination of the Zumwalt class's hull form, rudder stop locations, and propeller size contribute to its improved seakeeping.

=== Secondary guns ===
In 2005, a Critical Design Review (CDR) of the DDG-1000 led to the selection of the Mk 110 2.2-inch (57 mm) cannon to defend the destroyer against swarming attacks by small, fast boats; the Mk 110 has a rate of fire of 220 rounds per minute and a range of 9 nmi (17 km). From then to 2010, various analysis efforts were conducted to assess potential cost-saving alternatives. Following a 2012 assessment using the latest gun and munition effectiveness information, it was concluded that the Mk 46 1.2-inch (30 mm) Gun System was more effective than the Mk 110 with increased capability, reduced weight, and significant cost avoidance. The Mk 46 has a rate of fire of 200 rounds per minute and a range of 2.17 nmi (4.02 km).

Naval experts have questioned the decision to replace the close-in swarm defense guns of the Zumwalt-class destroyers with ones of decreased size and range. The 2.2-inch (57 mm) can engage targets at 2 to 3 nautical miles (3.7 to 5.6 km), while the 1.2-inch (30 mm) can only start to engage at around 1 nautical mile (1.9 km). However, the DDG-1000 program manager said that the 2.2-inch round's lethality was "significantly over-modeled" and "not as effective as modeled" in live test-firing, and "nowhere near meeting the requirements"; he admitted that the results were not what he expected to see. When the Naval Weapons Laboratory re-evaluated the Mk 46, it met or exceeded requirements and performed equal to or better than the 2.2-inch in multiple areas, even coming just ahead of the 3.0-inch (76 mm) naval cannon. A 1.2-inch gun mount also weighs less, around 2 tons compared to 12 to 14 tons for the 2.2-inch, but the Navy is adamant that weight had nothing to do with the decision.

== See also ==
- List of destroyer classes in service

Equivalent destroyers of the same era

- Type 055
- Maya class
- Sejong the Great-class destroyer
