= Advanced Gun System =

Naval artillery system

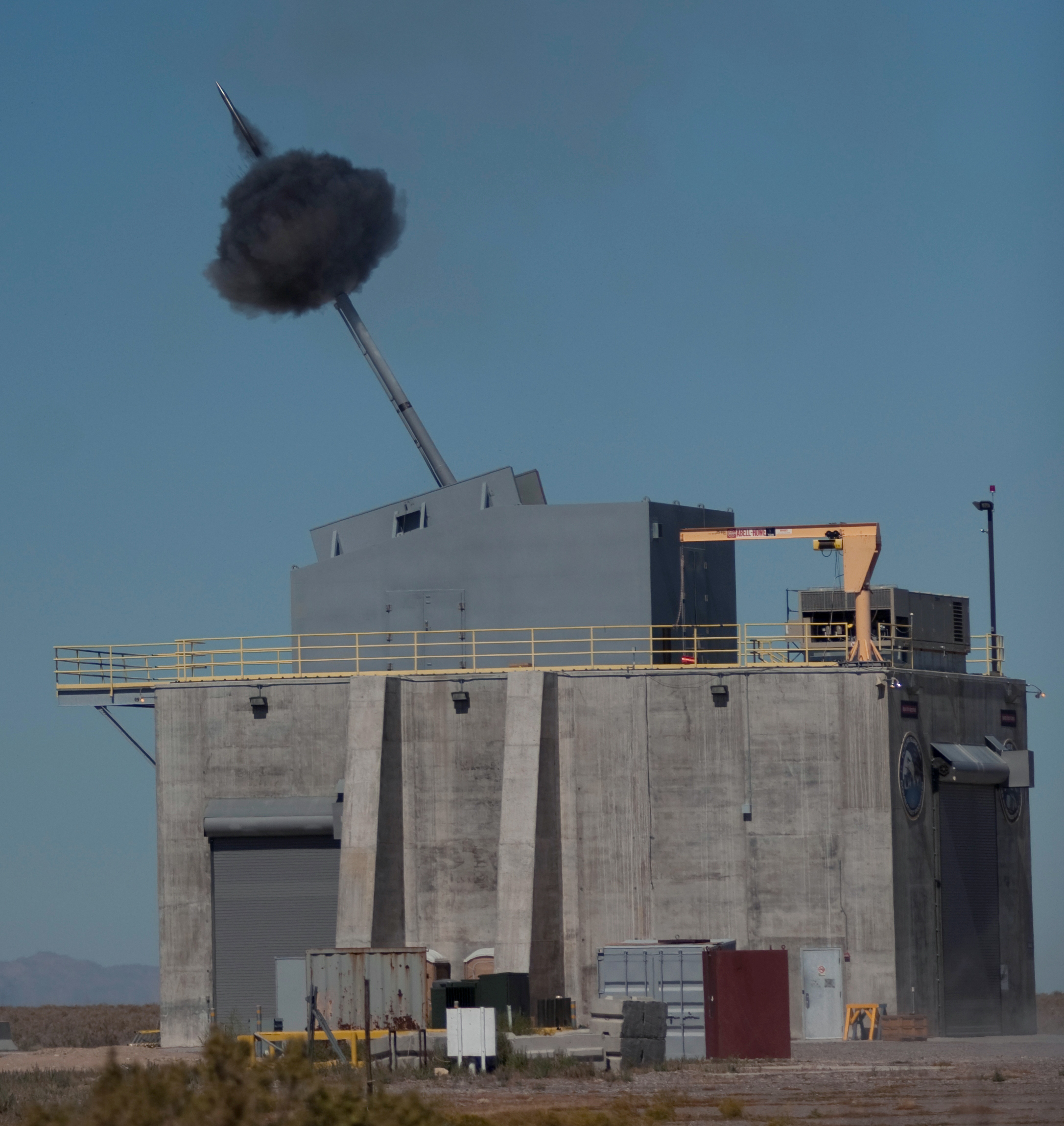
- Test firing of Advanced Gun System
- Type: Naval artillery
- Place of origin: United States

Production history
- Designer: BAE Systems Land & Armaments
- Designed: 1996
- Manufacturer: BAE Systems Land & Armaments
- Produced: 2010
- No. built: 6

Specifications
- Mass: 104 short tons (94 t; 93 long tons)
- Barrel length: 9.61 m (31.5 ft)
- Caliber: 155 mm (6.1 inch)
- Elevation: +70 / −5 degrees
- Rate of fire: 10 rounds per minute (rpm)
- Effective firing range: 83 nmi (150 km) with Long Range Land Attack Projectile (LRLAP)

The Advanced Gun System (AGS) is a naval artillery system developed and produced by BAE Systems Armaments & Services for the Zumwalt-class destroyer of the United States Navy. Designated the 155 mm/62 (6.1-inch) Mark 51 Advanced Gun System (AGS), it was designed to provide long-range naval gunfire support against shore-based targets. A total of six of the systems were installed, two on each of the three Zumwalt-class ships. The Navy has no plans for additional Zumwalt-class ships, and no plans to deploy AGS on any other ship. AGS can only use ammunition designed specifically for the system. Only one ammunition type was designed, and the Navy halted its procurement in November 2016 due to cost ($800,000 to $1,000,000 per round), so the AGS has no ammunition and cannot be used. The Navy began removing the AGS from the three ships starting in 2024.

== History ==
The Zumwalt-class and AGS were designed and developed in the context of the United States battleship retirement debate. Battleship proponents argued that the battleships should not be decommissioned until an alternative method of providing naval gunfire support could be deployed, while others argued that such support was no longer needed in the era of missiles and aircraft.

There has been research on extending the range of naval gunfire for many years. The 203 mm 8"/55 caliber Mark 71 gun was the US Navy's Major Caliber Lightweight Gun (MCLWG) program. The system was designed and tested in 1975, but the program was terminated in 1978. Gerald Bull and Naval Ordnance Station Indian Head tested an 11 in (280 mm) sub-caliber saboted long-range round in a stretched 16"/45 caliber Mark 6 gun in 1967. The Advanced Gun Weapon System Technology Program (AGWSTP) evaluated a similar projectile with longer range in the 1980s. After the last battleship, USS Missouri (BB-63), was decommissioned on 31 March 1992, the AGWSTP became a 127 mm (5-inch) gun with an intended range of 180 km (110 mi), which then led to the Vertical Gun for Advanced Ships (VGAS). The original DD-21 (1994 precursor to the Zumwalt-class design) was designed around this "vertical gun", but the project encountered serious technology and cost problems.

Originally designed for mounting as a vertical gun adapted from the VGAS design, this 155 mm (6.1 in) AGS was then designed and produced for mounting within a more conventional turret arrangement. The AGS was designed to deliver precision munitions at a high rate of fire and at over-the-horizon ranges. As a vertical gun system it would only have been capable of firing guided munitions; the turret mounting allows the use of unguided munitions as well if any are developed for it. Even though the 155 mm (6.1 in) caliber is the standard for both the US Army and NATO land artillery systems, the AGS is not designed to use the same standard munitions as other 155 mm (6.1 in) artillery. This means that each type of munition must be designed and manufactured specifically for the AGS.

Long Range Land Attack Projectile (LRLAP) ammunition for AGS was to be a major advance. LRLAP featured separate projectile and propellant portions and was to be highly precise, with a circular error probable (CEP) of 50 m (160 ft) or less. Lockheed Martin's flight test of the munition in July 2005 had a reported a flight distance of 59 nautical miles (109 km; 68 mi). However, LRLAP procurement was cancelled in 2016 and the navy had no plan to replace it. By early 2021, the navy was exploring replacing the AGS on Zumwalt-class ships with modules to carry hypersonic missiles. In March 2022, it was announced that both AGS would be removed from Zumwalt-class destroyers to enable installation of tubes to accommodate Common-Hypersonic Glide Body missiles. The switch was scheduled to begin in late 2023 as the ships undergo maintenance periods.

AGS was developed and produced by BAE Systems Armaments Systems (formerly United Defense) for the Zumwalt-class destroyer of the United States Navy. The first magazine was delivered to the U.S. Navy on May 25, 2010.

== Description ==
The AGS uses the same 155 mm caliber as most American field artillery forces, although it is unable to fire the same ammunition due to differences in the size and shape of both projectile and firing charges. The gun barrel is 62 calibers long, and is able to fire the entire magazine (300+ rounds) with an average rate of fire of ten rounds per minute using a water-cooled barrel. The AGS is mounted in a turret specifically designed for the Zumwalt-class destroyer with fully automated ammunition supply and operation. The turret itself is designed to be stealthy, allowing for the entire length of the barrel to be enclosed and hidden from radar when not firing.

A primary advantage of the AGS over the existing 127 mm Mark 45 5-inch gun which equips most major surface combatants of the US Navy was to be its increased capability for supporting ground forces and striking land targets. With a 10-round-per-minute capacity, it would have had the ability to deliver the firepower of a battery of six 155 mm howitzers. This was intended to increase the utility of vessels equipped with the weapon, especially in areas in which the US Navy exercises absolute sea supremacy.

== Ammunition ==
AGS cannot use ammunition designed for existing artillery, so each type of ammunition must be designed and manufactured for AGS. The only type to be designed as of 2018 was the LRLAP. LRLAP procurement, however, was canceled and there are no plans to replace it. Other projectiles were examined to replace the LRLAP, but since it is the only munition designed to be fired from the AGS, the barrel, software, cooling system, and automated magazines would have to be modified to accommodate a different round. It could cost up to $250 million in engineering costs to modify all six guns on the three ships to accept a new round.

After some research had been abandoned into whether the M982 Excalibur guided munition could be adapted for use with the AGS, officials announced in January 2018 that there was now no plan for any replacement round for the AGS. Instead, Naval Sea Systems Command and the Chief of Naval Operations staff would "monitor new technologies" which might be used with the AGS system in the future. In particular he noted that the BAE Hypervelocity Projectile testing, a cross-service 127 mm (5-inch) naval and 155 mm land, low-drag self-guided Mach 7–capable round originally intended for railguns, was achieving range close to the original LRLAP specification while having superior rate of fire and accuracy. As of 2018, The HVP rounds were estimated to cost around $25,000 for a surface-to-surface 127 mm (5-inch) or $86,000 for an anti-missile variant 155 mm round.

=== LRLAP ===
The development of new ammunition for the AGS under the name Long Range Land Attack Projectile (LRLAP) was one of the major advances offered by the AGS program. The munitions were highly precise, with a circular error probable (CEP) of 50 m (160 ft) or less. Lockheed Martin conducted a flight test of the munition in July 2005, reporting a flight distance of 59 nautical miles (109 km; 68 mi). The LRLAP ammunition features separate projectile and propellant portions. Total weight is 225 pounds (102 kg), including a bursting charge of 24 lb (11 kg). The maximum length of the combined munition is 88 in (220 cm), amounting to about 14 calibers.

In 2004, the manufacturer stated that the goal for the LRLAP per-round cost was $35,000. Shortly after the USS Zumwalt (DDG-1000) was commissioned but prior to weapons system integration, the U.S. Navy moved to cancel the LRLAP due to excessive cost. With the number of ships reduced from 32 to 3 examples, the per-unit cost of each LRLAP shot increased to $800,000–1 million. This made the system untenable even though there were no significant performance issues.
