= Japanese ship Akashi =

At least four naval vessels of Japan have borne the name Akashi:

- Japanese cruiser Akashi, a Suma-class cruiser launched in 1897 and expended as a target in 1930.
- Japanese repair ship Akashi, a repair ship launched in 1938 and sunk in 1944.
- JDS Akashi, an oceanographic research ship launched in 1971 and decommissioned in 1996.
- JS Akashi, an oceanographic research ship launched in 2025.
