= Integrated electric propulsion =

Arrangement of marine propulsion systems that generators generate electricity

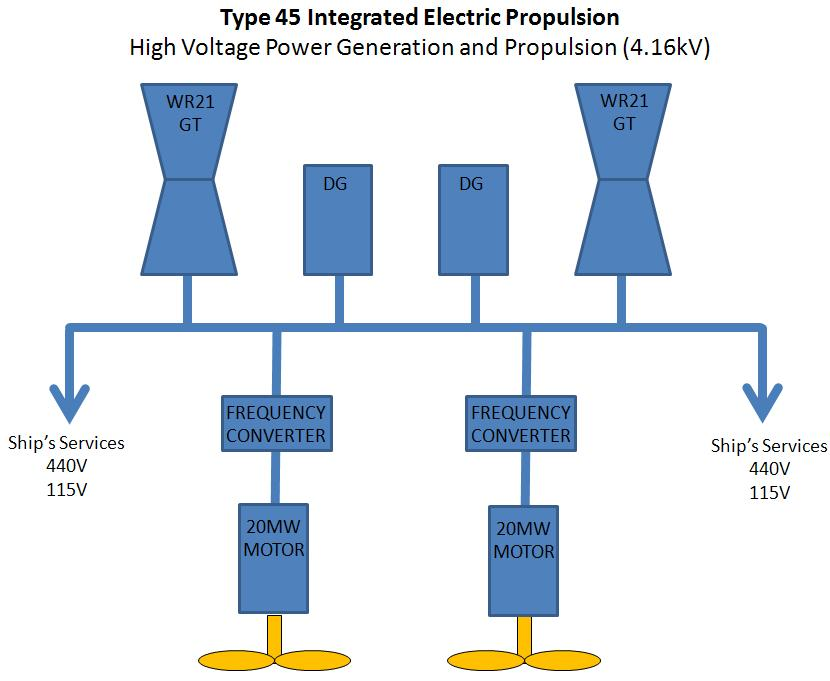
An example of integrated electric propulsion in the Type 45 destroyer (GT: gas turbine; DG: diesel generator)

Integrated electric propulsion (IEP), full electric propulsion (FEP) or integrated full electric propulsion (IFEP) is an arrangement of marine propulsion systems such that gas turbines or diesel generators, or both, generate three-phase electricity that is then used to power electric motors that turn either propellers or waterjet impellors. It is a modification of the combined diesel–electric and gas propulsion system for ships which eliminates the need for clutches and reduces or eliminates the need for gearboxes by using electrical transmission rather than mechanical transmission of energy; so, it is a series hybrid electric propulsion, instead of parallel.

Some newer nuclear-powered warships also use a form of IEP. A nuclear power plant produces the steam to operate turbine generators; these in turn power electric propulsion motors.

== Integrated system ==
Combined marine propulsion
Combined diesel or gas	(CODOG)
Combined diesel and gas	(CODAG)
Combined diesel–electric and diesel	(CODLAD)
Combined diesel–electric and gas	(CODLAG)
Combined diesel and diesel	(CODAD)
Combined steam and gas	(COSAG)
Combined gas or gas	(COGOG)
Combined gas and gas	(COGAG)
Combined gas and steam	(COGAS)
Combined nuclear and steam	(CONAS)
Integrated electric propulsion	(IEP or IFEP)

Eliminating the mechanical connection between engines and propellers has several advantages including increased freedom in placement of the engines, acoustical decoupling of the engines from the hull, which makes the ship less noisy, and a reduction in weight and volume. Reducing acoustic signature is particularly important to naval vessels seeking to avoid detection and to cruise ships seeking to provide passengers with a pleasant voyage, but is of less benefit to cargo ships. Because ships require electricity even when not underway, having all of the engines produce electricity reduces the number of engines needed compared to more traditional arrangements in which one pool of engines provides electricity and another pool of engines provides propulsion, reducing capital and maintenance costs.

A typical integrated electric propulsion arrangement on larger (e.g. cruise ships) and naval vessels includes both diesel generators and gas turbines. On smaller vessels (which make up the majority of IEP vessels) the engines are typically just diesel. The advantages of gas turbines include much lower weight. and smaller size than diesels of similar power, with much less noise and vibration; but gas turbines are efficient only at or near maximum power. Diesel generators have the advantage of high efficiency over a wide range of power levels. Using both types in combination allows for the benefits of a full range of operational efficiency, a low-vibration quiet mode of operation, and some reduction in weight and volume relative to a diesel-only arrangement. In naval vessels, a pool of diesel generators are typically used to provide a base load and enough power to achieve cruise speed. The gas turbines are used to provide peak power for higher speeds and may be required to operate weapon systems that have high power demands. In passenger ships, one or more gas turbines are used for fast cruising. The diesels provide reliable redundancy and an efficient source of electricity when in port, at anchor, or drifting.

A diesel–electric system is an integrated electric propulsion system in which no gas turbines are used and all of the engines are diesel.

A turbine–electric system is possible using only gas turbine generators. Some yachts use only gas turbines for integrated electric propulsion without any diesel engines. If electric propulsion is used via electric motor on shaft, or integrated into the main reduction gear driving the shaft, greater power is realized faster than using diesels. In addition, an on-shaft permanent magnet motor drive system, utilizing gas turbine prime movers on the main reduction gear, can also provide electricity when driven by the prime movers. The on-shaft permanent magnet electric motors provide propulsion at lower speeds via on-board electrical power generation by gas turbine or diesel, at significant fuel savings. If fleet-wide usage is analyzed, significant logistical advantages are realized over time. Compared to diesel, a gas turbine system increases flexibility, versatility, and efficiency, with the capability of transforming to provide either propulsion or electrical power more rapidly.

== Reducing pollution ==
In Norway, gas electric hybrid propulsion is being used on a fleet of fully electric and plug-in hybrid ferries that cross fjords. Capable of travelling at 17–18 knots, these ships reduce total NO_{x} by 8,000 tonnes, and CO_{2} emissions by 300,000 tonnes, per year. While saving a million litres of diesel per year per ferry, the ferries recharge their batteries overnight and top them up from shore power at each port of call.

== List of IEP ships ==
- DDG(X) – U.S. Navy program to develop a class of principal surface combatants
- Type 45 destroyer – 2009 Royal Navy destroyer class
- Zumwalt-class destroyer – Stealth missile destroyer class of the US Navy
- RMS Queen Mary 2 – British Cruise Ship and Ocean Liner (Cunard Line)
- Lewis and Clark-class dry cargo ship – US dry cargo and ammunition ship
- Queen Elizabeth-class aircraft carrier – Royal Navy aircraft carrier class
- Juan Carlos I LHD (Spanish Navy)
- Multi Role Combat Vessel (Republic Of Singapore Navy)
- Canberra-class landing helicopter dock – Australian naval amphibious ship class
- Shirase – Japanese Polar Icebreaker
- JS Nichinan – Nichinan-class oceanographic research ship of JMSDF
- JS Shōnan – Shōnan-class oceanographic research ship of JMSDF
- Leeuwin-class survey vessel – Australian naval research ship class
- Type 076 landing helicopter dock, People's Liberation Army Navy – Class of amphibious assault ship
- INS Anvesh (A41) – Missile range instrumentation ship
- Project 18-class destroyer – Indian stealth guided missile destroyers
- USS Langley (CV-1) – First United States Navy aircraft carrier

== See also ==
- Electric boat
- DC distribution system (ship propulsion)
