= JS Shōnan =

Shōnan-class oceanographic research ship of JMSDF

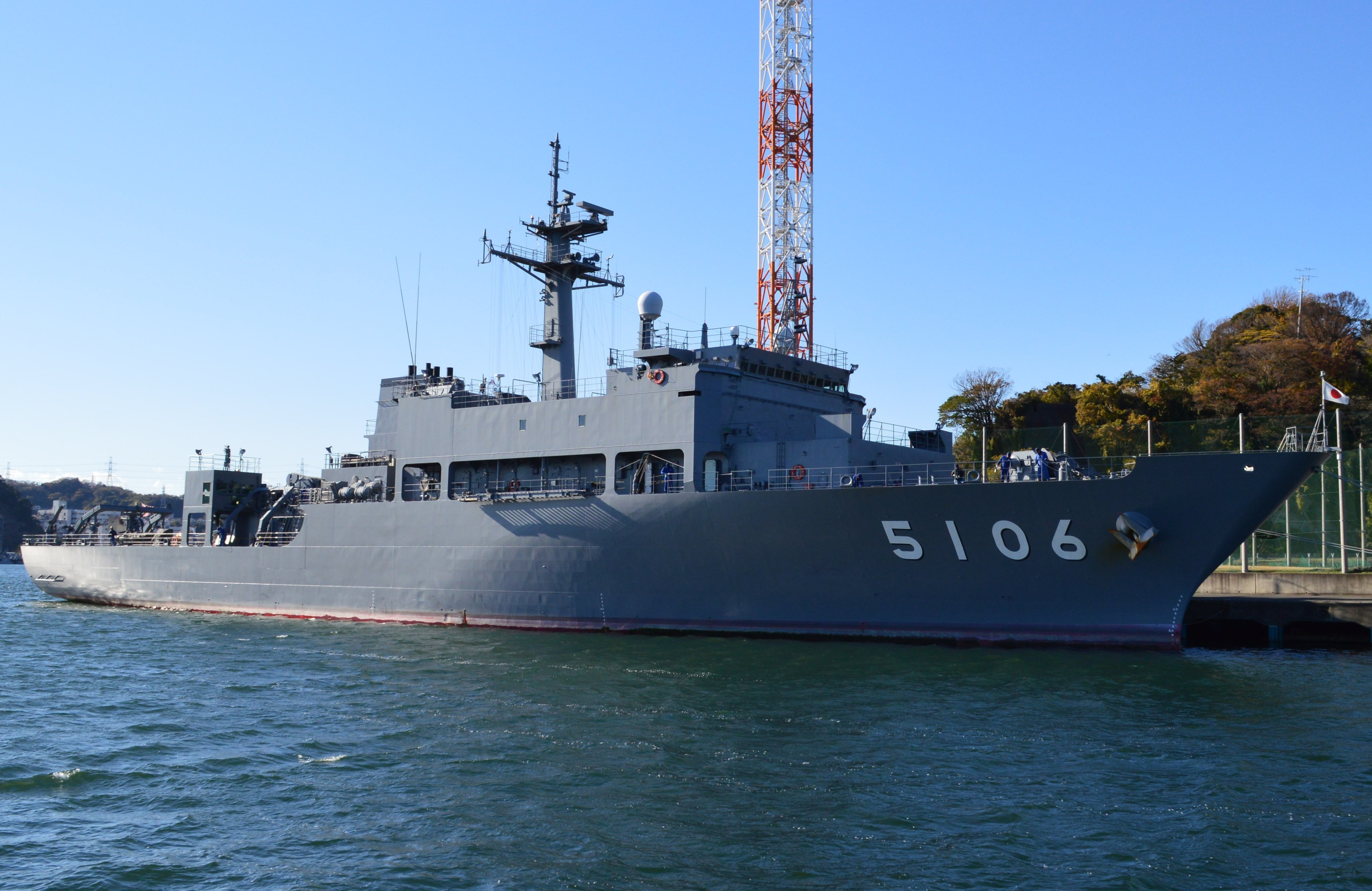
- JS Shōnan on 29 November 2013

History

Japan
- Name: Shōnan; (しょうなん)
- Namesake: Shōnan
- Ordered: 2007
- Builder: Mitsui, Tamano
- Laid down: 16 December 2008
- Launched: 29 June 2009
- Commissioned: 17 March 2010
- Home port: Yokosuka
- Identification: Pennant number: AGS-5106
- Status: Active

Class overview
- Preceded by: Nichinan class
- Succeeded by: Akashi class

General characteristics
- Type: Oceanographic research ship
- Displacement: 2,950 t (2,900 long tons) standard; 4,150 t (4,080 long tons) full load
- Length: 103.0 m (337 ft 11 in)
- Beam: 16.4 m (53 ft 10 in)
- Draft: 4.5 m (14 ft 9 in)
- Depth: 9.0 m (29 ft 6 in)
- Propulsion: 3 × Mitsubishi S16U diesel electric engines; 2 × shafts
- Speed: 16 kn (30 km/h; 18 mph)
- Complement: 80
- Sensors & processing systems: OPS-20 surface-search radar; OPS-28 surface-search radar; Sonar

JS Shōnan (AGS-5106) is the only ship of her type of oceanographic research ship for the Japan Maritime Self-Defense Force.

== Development ==
The ship was built as a replacement for the Futami-class, which was scheduled to be removed in the late 2000s. In terms of design, she is said to be a modification of the preceding JS Nichinan, and the ship type is also the same long bow type, but as a result of the emphasis on reducing construction costs, a major reexamination was carried out in all aspects. The hull design uses a commercial ship structure.

The biggest change in appearance is the abolition of the bow sheave on the bow, which was adopted by JDS Akashi for the purpose of laying and maintaining underwater acoustic equipment and cables, and has been followed by the Futami-class and Nichinan since then, but it has been followed by cable engines and cable storage. The bow side crane was also abolished, which led to a considerable simplification of the structure and equipment. With the abolition of the bow sheave, the requirement for the height of the bridge has been relaxed, and the superstructure is said to have two layers, which is one layer lower than JS Nichinan. In addition, large anti-sway tanks are installed on both sides of the rear part of the superstructure, similar to JS Nichinan. On the other hand, the stern deck is regarded as an observation deck like JS Nichinan, and it is equipped with a break-action crane in the center of the port side and an A-frame crane in the stern.

The main engine is said to be a diesel-electric system similar to the JS Nichinan, and integrated electric propulsion shared with the onboard service generator. On the other hand, the propeller was changed to a pod-type azimuth thruster that can turn 360 degrees, which was the first adoption as the main propeller of the Maritime Self-Defense Force's ship. Combined with this and the bow thruster, it has excellent ship position holding ability.

== Design ==
For general ocean observation, she is equipped with a self-recording surface water temperature salinity meter, a seafloor-mounted ultrasonic multi-layer current meter, a water temperature recorder, a CTD observation device, and a mooring self-recording current meter. It is also equipped with an acoustic environment measurement system, a towed sound source device, and a positioning device for observation for underwater acoustic observation.

As an oceanographic surveying device, she is equipped with a mud collector, etc., including a multi-beam bathymetric sounder installed on the bottom of the bridge below the bridge.

In order to process and analyze these observation data and collected specimens, the first observation room is set up behind the bridge at the 03 deck level, and the second observation room is set up behind the first deck. Of these, the second observation room is a so-called wet laboratory that handles samples collected from the sea and the seabed.

She is equipped with dabits for onboard boats on the decks of the poop on both sides of the chimney, with an 11-meter work boat on the port side and a compound work boat on the starboard side.

== Equipment ==
For general ocean observation, it is equipped with a water temperature recorder, an ultrasonic Doppler multi-layer current meter, a moored self-recording current meter (AICM-2F), a shipboard meteorological observation device, and a microwave wave height meter. It is also equipped with a buoy suspension type sound wave propagation measuring device (WQM-10B), a subsidence type sound wave propagation measuring device (EMB), and a seafloor return loss measuring device (BLMS) for underwater acoustic observation. The equipment related to the laying of acoustic observation equipment is grouped in the front half of the ship, and a large sheave and gantry crane are installed on the bow.

Ocean surveying equipment includes a sea beam 2112 type multi-narrow beam sounder installed on the bottom of the bridge, a mud sampler, and a proton magnetometer (magnetic resonance magnetometer).

In order to process and analyze these observation data and collected specimens, the first observation room is set up behind the bridge at the 3rd deck level, and the second observation room is set up behind the first deck. Of these, the first observation room is equipped with an observation data integration processing device that can accurately edit and record so that post-processing on land is easy after adding metadata such as time and position to the collected data.

As for the onboard boats, 11-meter work boats are mounted on the dabit on the deck of the poop on both sides of the chimney, of which the port side boats are equipped with shallow sea echo sounders and towed side scan sonar. It is said to be an observation work boat.

In addition, it is equipped with a roped unmanned underwater vehicle (ROV) for underwater work such as cable repair. It is usually mounted on the deck room that is continuous with the deck of the ship tower, and is lifted and lowered by the A-frame crane at the stern. Made in the United States, it weighs about 5.5 tons in the air, has a total length of about 2.9 meters, a width of about 1.8 meters, and a height of about 2.4 meters. It is equipped with two manipulators and a water jet excavator as work equipment. She is said to have a pressure resistance of 1,000 meters and a working depth of 400 meters.

== Construction and career ==
Shōnan was laid down on 7 August 1997 and launched on 1 June 1998 by Mitsui Engineering & Shipbuilding Tamano Shipyard. Started sea trials on December 2, the same year. She was commissioned on March 17, 2010, and she was transferred to the Oceanographic Command in Yokosuka.

On December 1, 2015, the Oceanographic Command Group was reorganized into the Oceanographic Command and Anti-submarine Support Group, and was incorporated into the 1st Oceanographic Observatory, which was newly formed under the same group.

Around 3:00 am on April 23, 2016, the Chinese Navy's Type 053H3 frigate, Jiaxing, Lianyungang, and the Type 903 supply ship Gaoyouhu sailing north from the Pacific Ocean to the East China Sea 65 km south-southwest of Nakanokami Island and 74 km south-southeast of Yonaguni Island. Discovered and monitored Gaoyouhu. After that, at around 7:30 am, she went out of the connecting water area 45 km north-northeast of Yonaguni Island.
