= JS Wakasa =

Futami-class oceanographic research ship of JMSDF

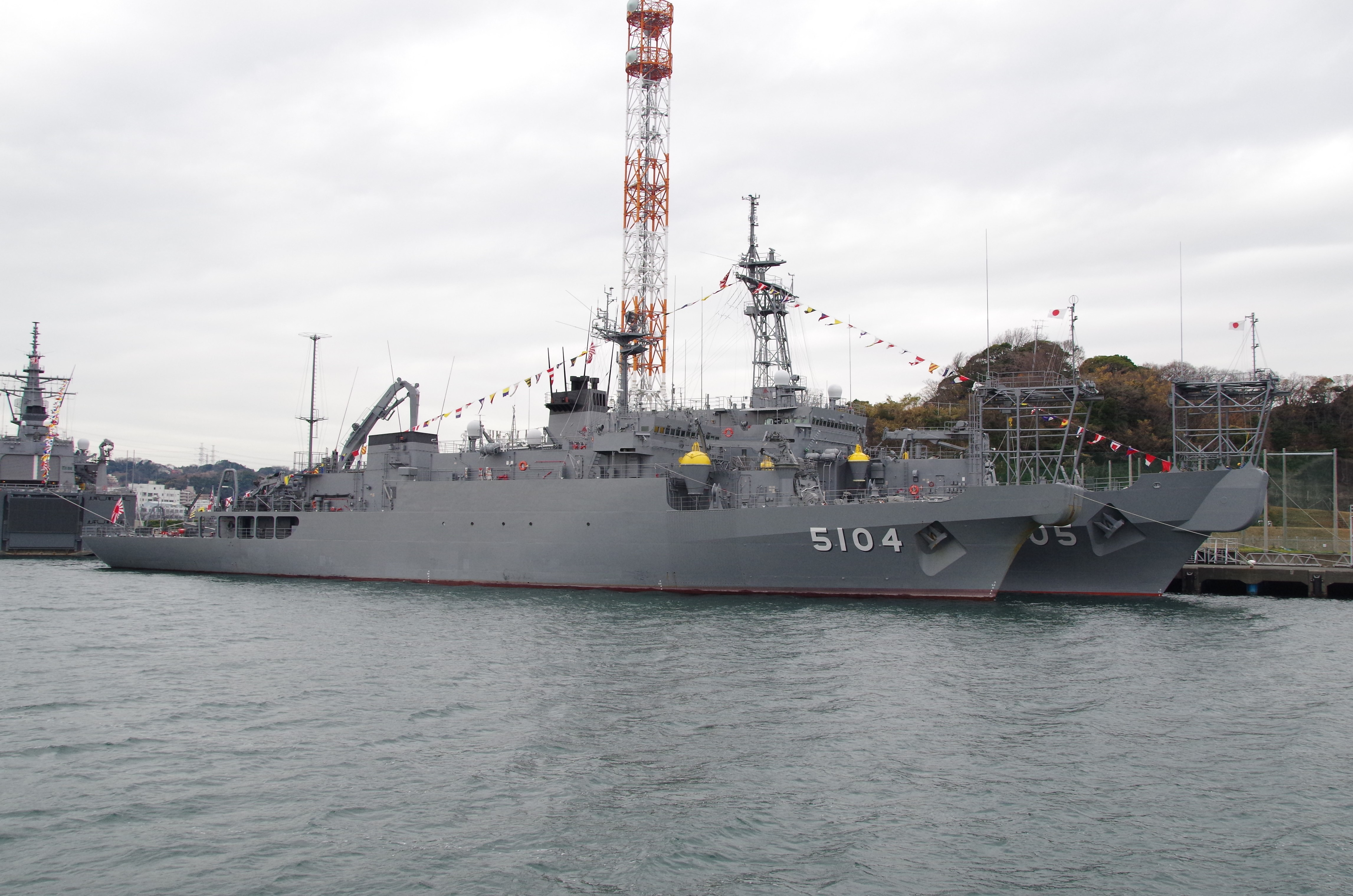
- Wakasa and Nichinan on 23 December 2012

History

Japan
- Name: Wakasa; (わかさ)
- Namesake: Wakasa
- Ordered: 1976
- Builder: Hitachi, Maizuru
- Laid down: 21 August 1984
- Launched: 21 May 1985
- Commissioned: 25 February 1986
- Decommissioned: 19 March 2026
- Home port: Yokosuka
- Identification: Pennant number: AGS-5104
- Status: Decommissioned

General characteristics
- Class & type: Futami class oceanographic research ship
- Displacement: 2,050 t (2,020 long tons) standard; 3,200 t (3,100 long tons) full load
- Length: 97.0 m (318 ft 3 in)
- Beam: 15 m (49 ft 3 in)
- Draft: 4.3 m (14 ft 1 in)
- Depth: 7.6 m (24 ft 11 in)
- Propulsion: 2 × Fuji 8L27.5XF diesel electric engines; 2 × shafts
- Speed: 16 kn (30 km/h; 18 mph)
- Complement: 95
- Sensors & processing systems: OPS-18 surface-search radar
- Electronic warfare & decoys: NOLR-6

JS Wakasa (AGS-5104) was a Futami-class oceanographic research ship for the Japan Maritime Self-Defense Force.

== Construction and career ==
Wakasa was laid down on 21 August 1984 and launched on 21 May 1985 by Hitachi Zosen Corporation Maizuru Shipyard. She was commissioned on 25 February 1986 and was incorporated into the Marine Service Corps and deployed in Yokosuka.

The fishing boat Kiyotoku Maru (7.3t), whose hull was cut off after colliding with JS Atago on 18 February 2008, was towed by Muroto.

On 18 September 2009, Naoko Matsuo, 3rd class Kaisa (at that time), was appointed as Wakasa's captain, becoming the first female captain of the Maritime Self-Defense Force.

In response to the Great East Japan Earthquake caused by the 2011 off the Pacific coast of Tohoku Earthquake, Wakasa departs from Yokosuka for disaster relief. At 2:42 pm on March 21, she shipped relief supplies to the Ishinomaki City Oshika General Branch. She returned to Yokosuka on 28 March.

On 1 December 2015, the Oceanographic Command Group was reorganized into the Oceanographic Command and Anti-submarine Support Group. Wakasa was incorporated into the 1st Oceanographic Observatory, which was newly formed under the same group.

When JS Akashi was commissioned in March 2026 to replace Wakasa, the latter was decommissioned on 19 March.

== Gallery ==
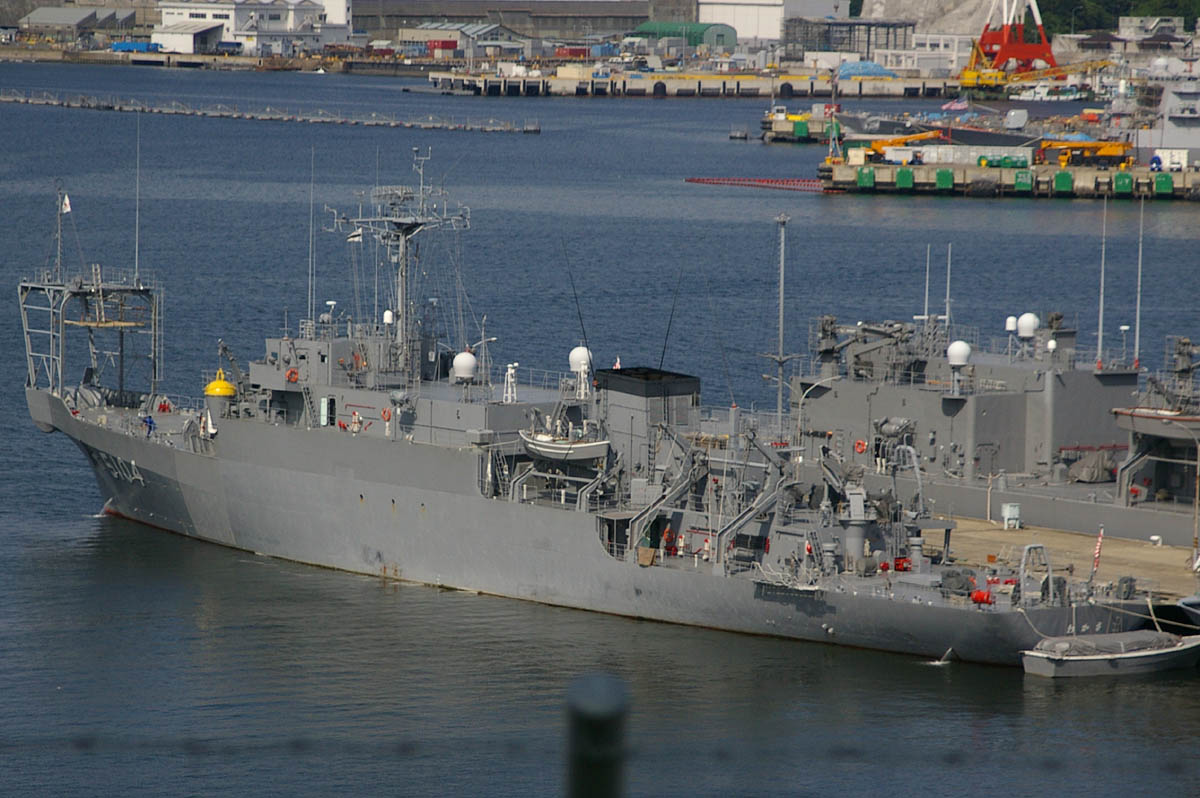
JS Wakasa on 17 June 2007

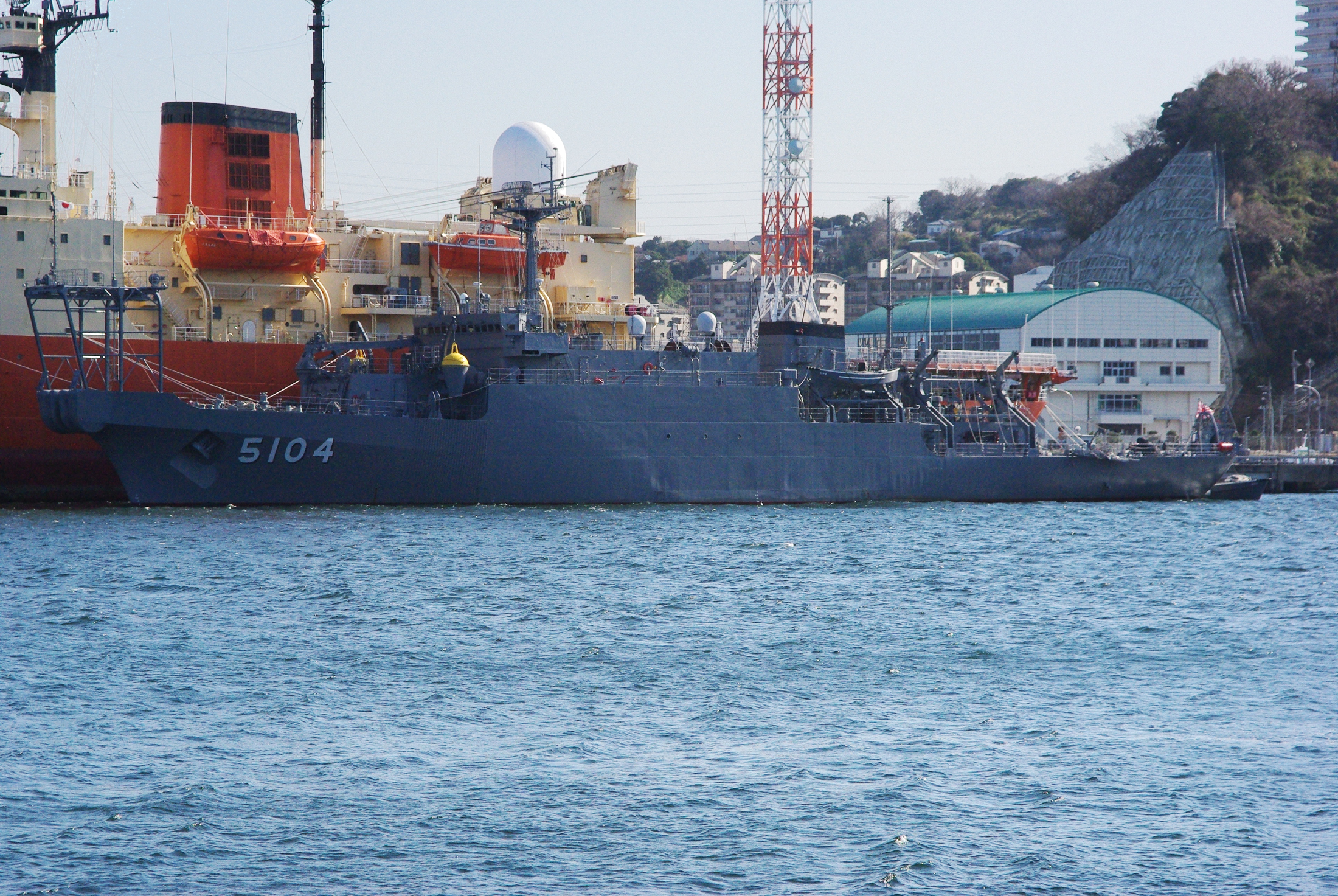
JS Wakasa on 8 February 2009

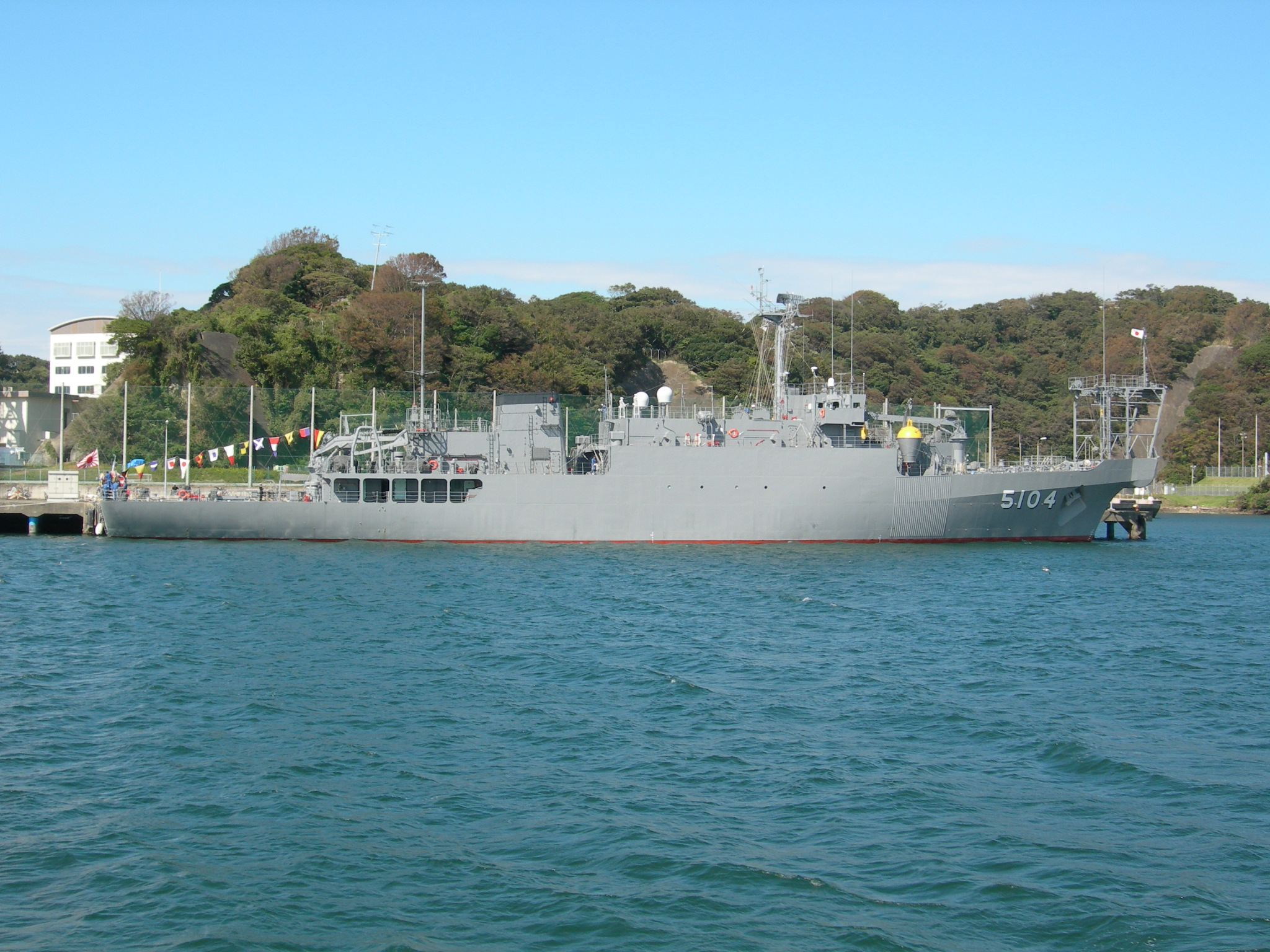
JS Wakasa on 26 October 2011

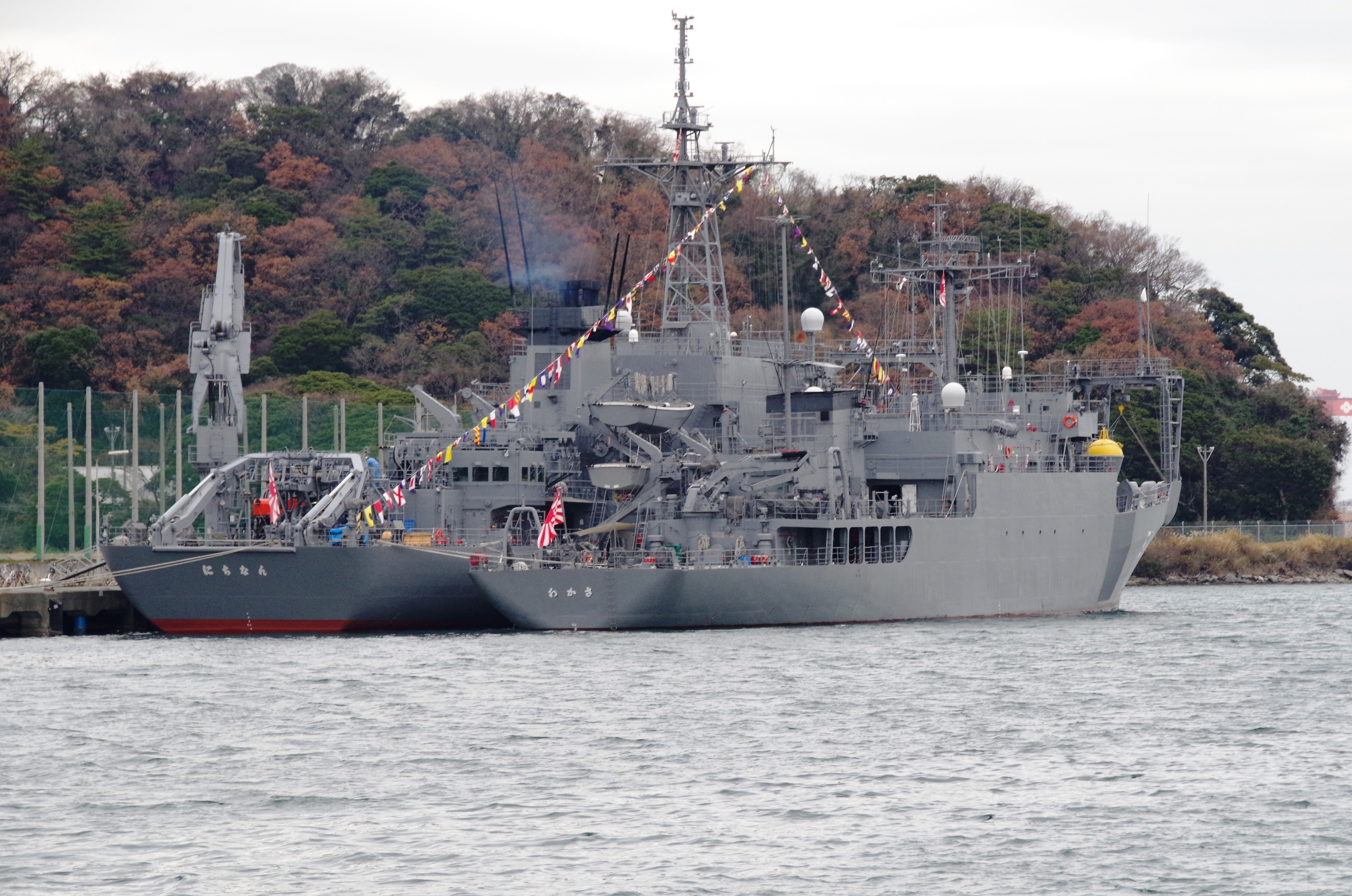
JS Wakasa and JS Nichinan on 23 December 2012

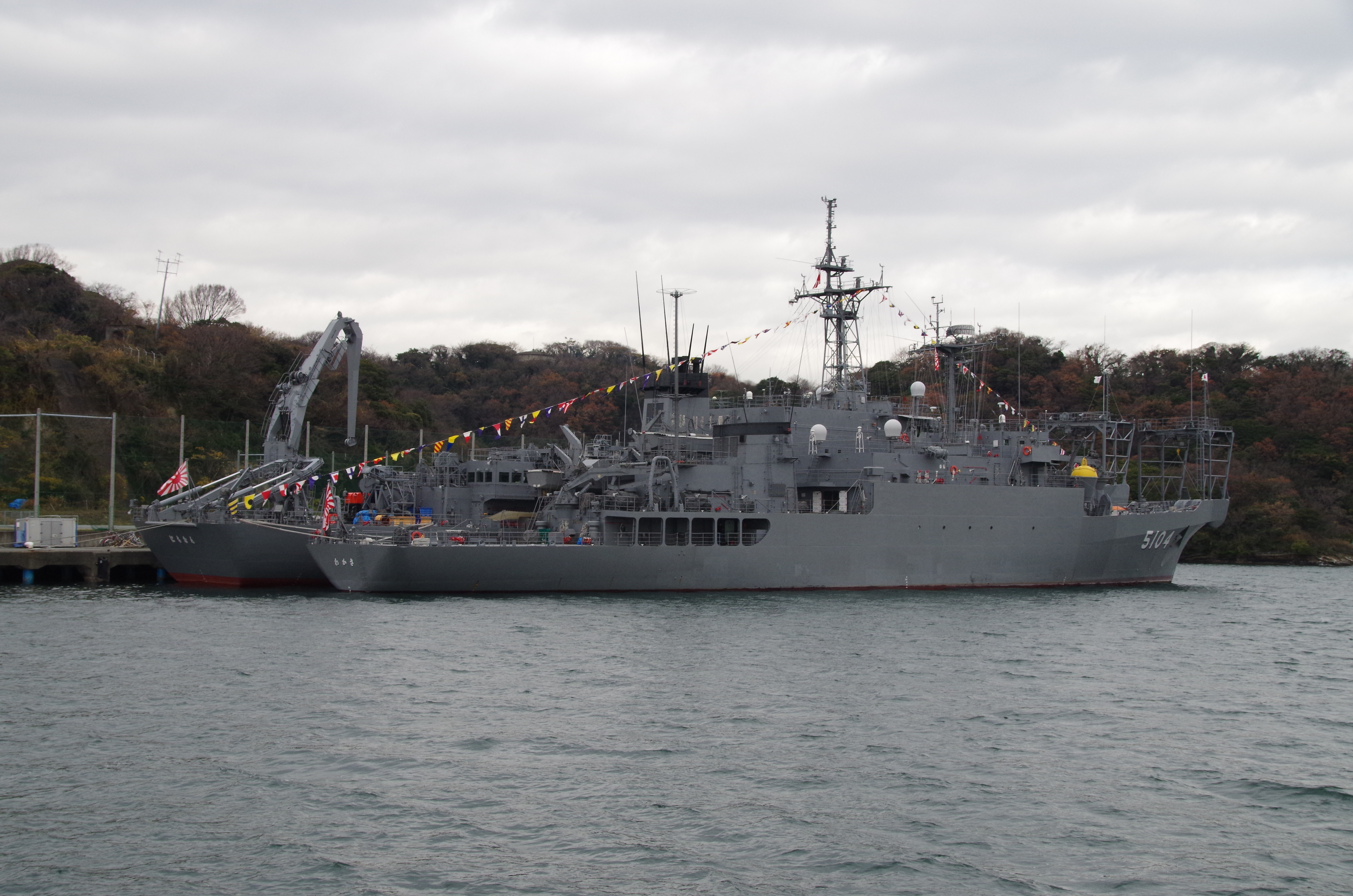
