= JS Futami =

Futami-class oceanographic research ship of JMSDF

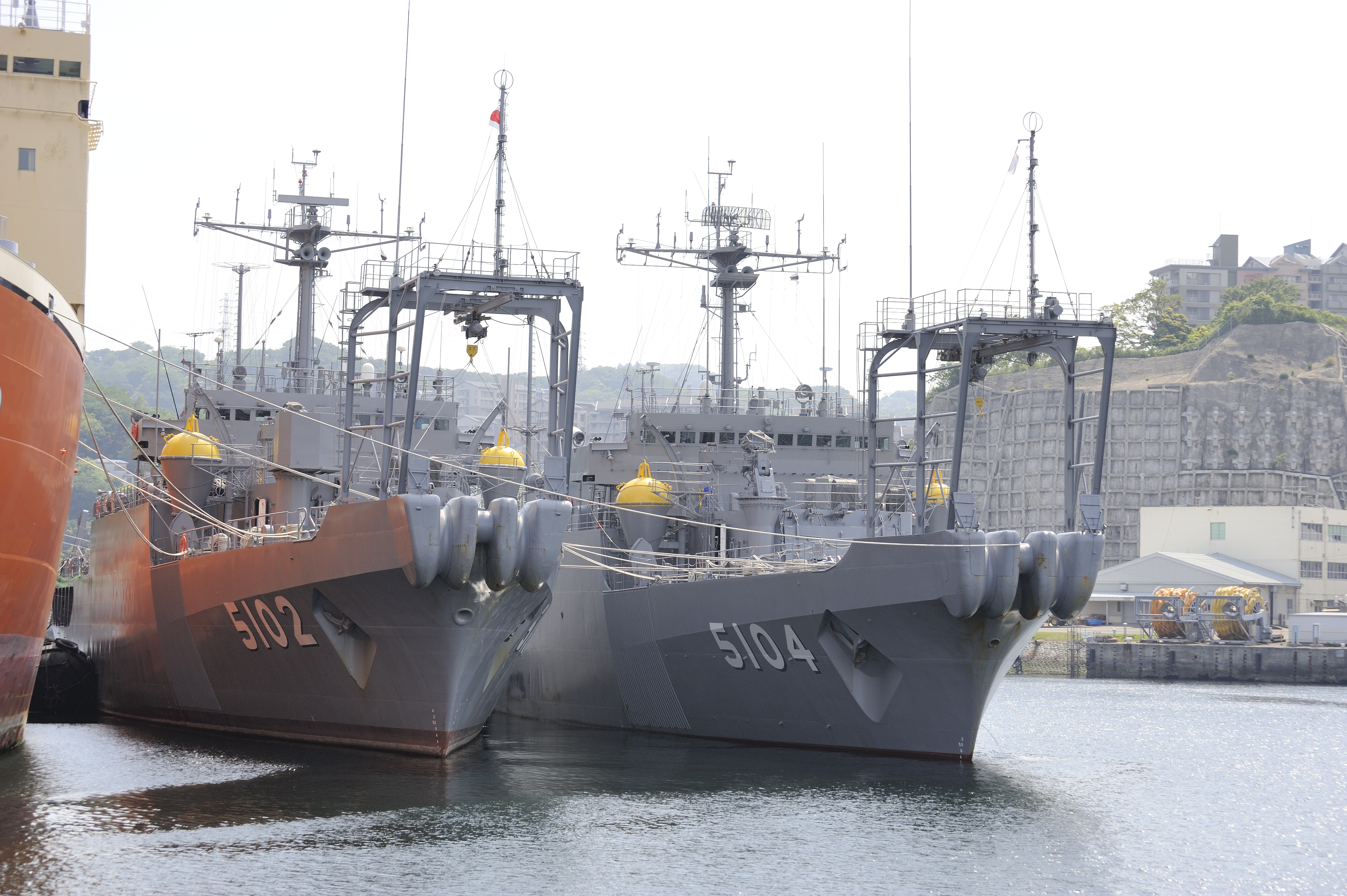
- JS Futami (left) and JS Wakasa (right)

History

Japan
- Name: Futami; (ふたみ)
- Namesake: Futami
- Ordered: 1976
- Builder: Mitsubishi, Shimonoseki
- Laid down: 20 January 1978
- Launched: 9 August 1978
- Commissioned: 27 February 1979
- Decommissioned: 17 March 2010
- Home port: Yokosuka
- Identification: Pennant number: AGS-5102
- Status: Decommissioned

General characteristics
- Class & type: Futami class oceanographic research ship
- Displacement: 2,050 t (2,020 long tons) standard; 3,200 t (3,100 long tons) full load
- Length: 97.0 m (318 ft 3 in)
- Beam: 15 m (49 ft 3 in)
- Draft: 4.3 m (14 ft 1 in)
- Depth: 7.6 m (24 ft 11 in)
- Propulsion: 2 × Kawasaki V8 V22 / 30ATL diesel electric engines; 2 × shafts
- Speed: 16 kn (30 km/h; 18 mph)
- Complement: 95
- Sensors & processing systems: OPS-18 surface-search radar
- Electronic warfare & decoys: NOLR-6

JS Futami (AGS-5102) was a Futami-class oceanographic research ship for the Japan Maritime Self-Defense Force.

== Construction and career ==
Futami was laid down on 20 January 1978 and launched on 9 August 1978 by Mitsubishi Heavy Industries Shimonoseki Shipyard. She was commissioned on 27 February 1979 and was incorporated into the Marine Service Corps and deployed in Yokosuka.

On 17 March 1980, the Marine Service Corps was reorganized into the Oceanographic Command.

She was decommissioned on 17 March 2010. During her service, her total voyage reached 579,780 nautical miles, about 28 weeks on Earth, and total voyage time of 74,809 hours.
