= JS Akashi =

Japanese oceanographic research ship

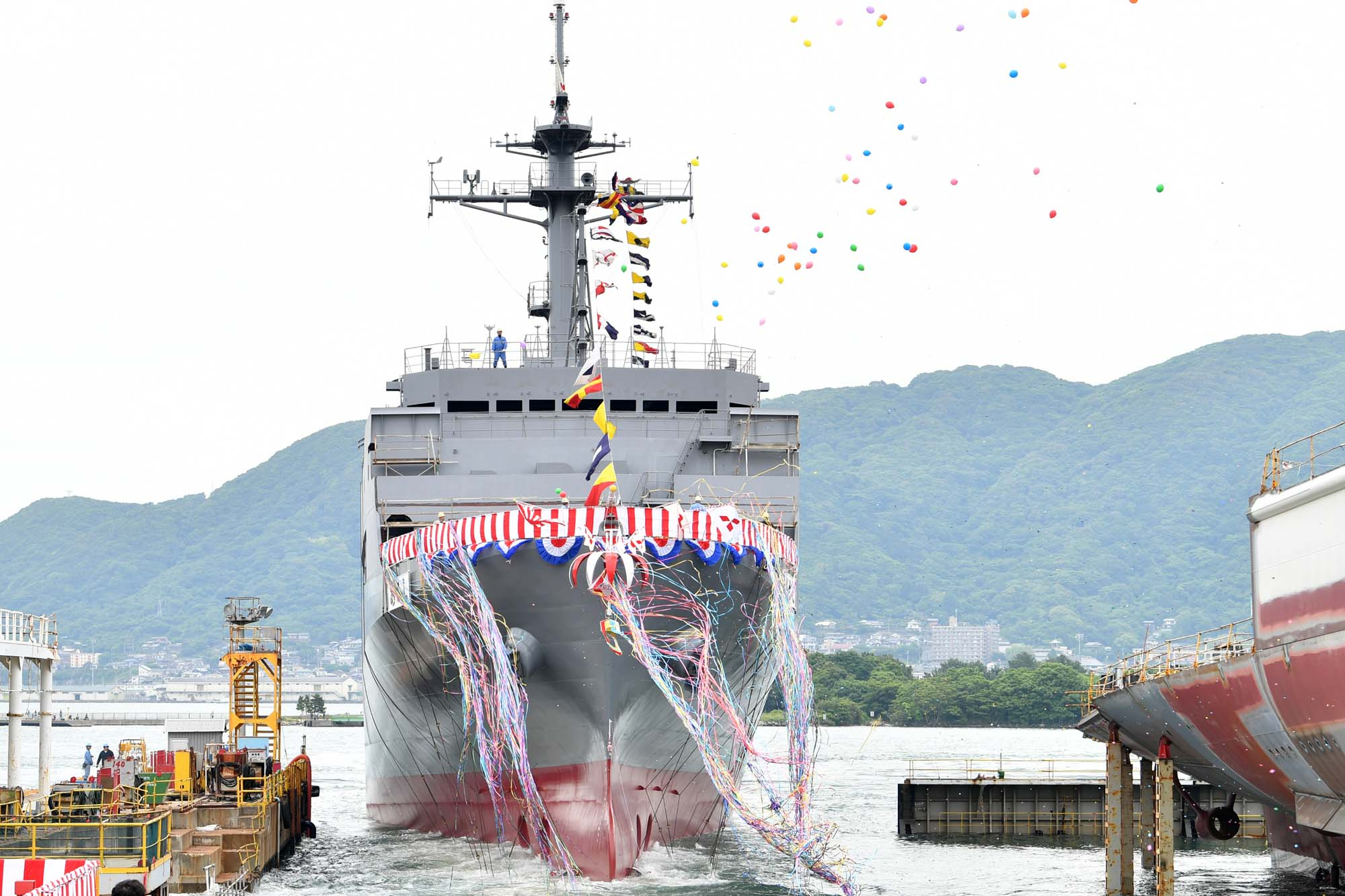
- Akashi being launched, 29 May 2025

History

Japan
- Name: Akashi
- Ordered: 2022
- Builder: Mitsubishi Heavy Industries Shimonoseki Shipyard
- Cost: 28.3 billion yen
- Laid down: 20 August 2024
- Launched: 29 May 2025
- Commissioned: 9 March 2026
- Home port: Yokosuka
- Identification: Pennant number: AGS-5107
- Status: Active

Class overview
- Preceded by: Shōnan
- Succeeded by: N/A

General characteristics
- Type: Oceanographic research ship
- Displacement: 3,500 t (3,400 long tons; 3,900 short tons) (standard); 4,700 t (4,600 long tons; 5,200 short tons) (full load)
- Length: 113.7 m (373 ft 0 in)
- Beam: 17.8 m (58 ft 5 in)
- Draft: 9.2 m (30 ft 2 in)
- Installed power: 4,600 hp (3,400 kW)
- Propulsion: 2 x Azimuth thrusters; 2 x bow thrusters
- Speed: 16 kn (30 km/h; 18 mph)
- Crew: Approximately 90

JS Akashi (Japanese: あかし; Pennant number: AGS-5107) is an oceanographic research ship built for the Japan Maritime Self-Defense Force, named after the Akashi Coast. She is the fourth ship to bear this name, after the Imperial Japanese Navy's protected cruiser Akashi, the repair ship Akashi, and the JMSDF's research ship Akashi.

== Construction and career ==
Akashi was laid down at the Enora Plant of Mitsubishi Heavy Industries' Shimonoseki Shipyard in May 2023, as part of the JMSDF's Mid-Term Defense Program for the fiscal year 2022. She was christened and launched on 29 May 2025, costing 28.3 billion yen during the vessel's construction. After a period of fitting out and sea trials, Akashi was commissioned on 9 March 2026. She will be deployed to the Yokosuka Naval Base, replacing JS Wakasa of the 1st Oceanographic Research Squadron under the Oceanography ASW Support Command.
