= JS Nichinan =

Nichinan-class oceanographic research ship of JMSDF

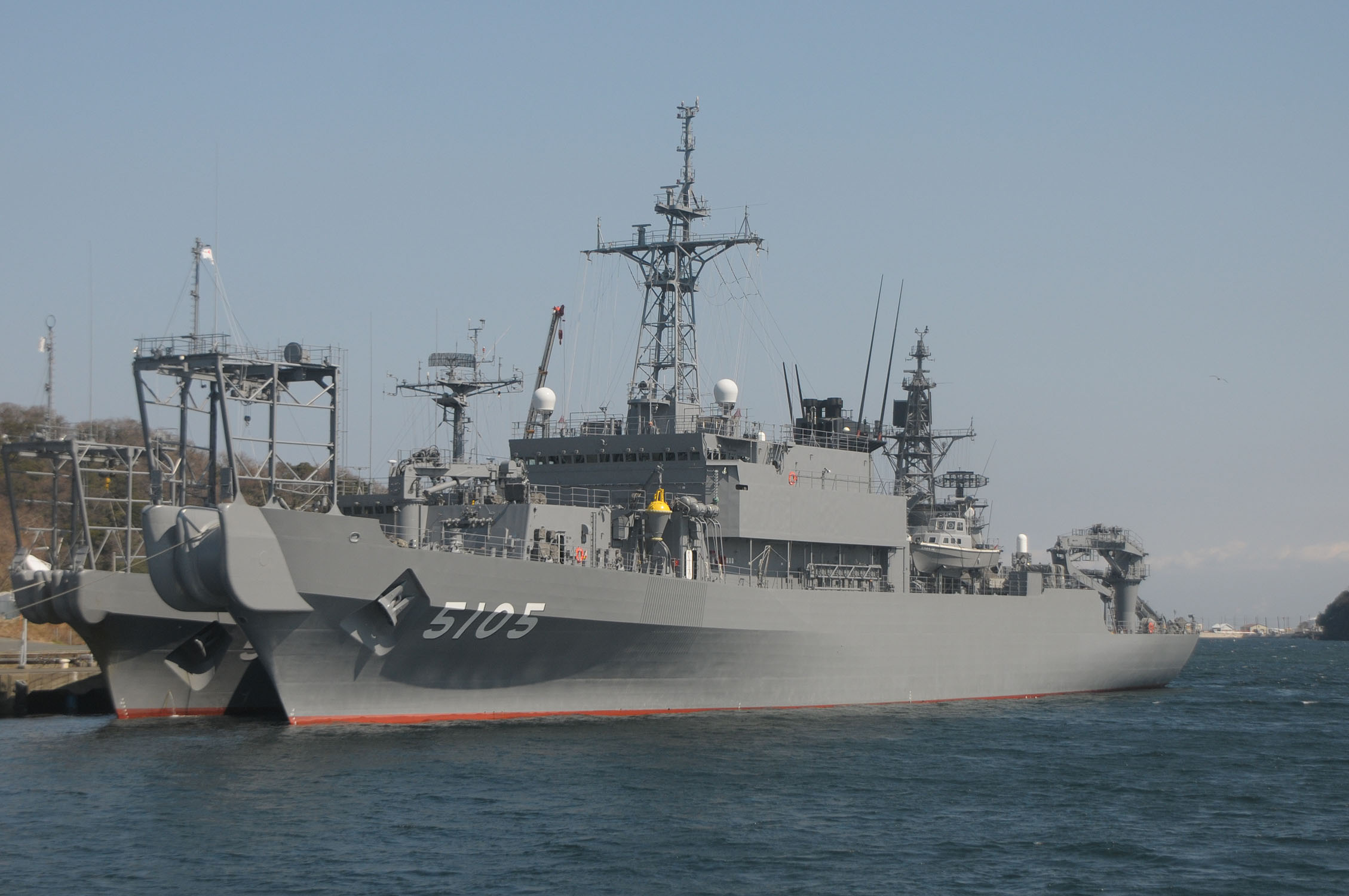
- JS Nichinan on 3 March 2012

History

Japan
- Name: Nichinan; (にちなん)
- Namesake: Nichinan
- Ordered: 1996
- Builder: Mitsubishi, Shimonoseki
- Laid down: 7 August 1997
- Launched: 11 June 1998
- Commissioned: 24 March 1999
- Home port: Yokosuka
- Identification: Pennant number: AGS-5105; IMO number: 9178604; MMSI number: 431999636; Callsign: ZL6DEF1
- Status: Active

Class overview
- Preceded by: Futami class
- Succeeded by: Shōnan class

General characteristics
- Type: Oceanographic research ship
- Displacement: 3,300 t (3,200 long tons) standard; 4,500 t (4,400 long tons) full load
- Length: 111.0 m (364 ft 2 in)
- Beam: 17 m (55 ft 9 in)
- Draft: 4.5 m (14 ft 9 in)
- Depth: 9.0 m (29 ft 6 in)
- Propulsion: 2 × Mitsubishi S16U diesel electric engines; 1 × Mitsubishi S8U diesel electric engine; 2 × shafts
- Speed: 20 kn (37 km/h; 23 mph)
- Complement: 80
- Sensors & processing systems: OPS-20 surface-search radar; Sonar Sea Beam 2112 Multibeam Echo Sounder
- Electronic warfare & decoys: NORA-1

JS Nichinan (AGS-5105) is the only ship of her type of oceanographic research ship for the Japan Maritime Self-Defense Force.

== Development ==
With the shift to passive anti-submarine warfare, the collection of marine environmental data is required for efficient execution of maritime operations, and seafloor topography / sediment, tidal currents / geomagnetism, and water temperature / salt content, etc. Marine weather was interrelated and needed to be measured precisely. For this reason, the Maritime Self-Defense Force built the JDS Akashi in the plan of 1967, and in 1969, it newly formed the Marine Operations Corps as its operation unit and started marine environment information activities. After that, in the 1950s, Futami-class oceanographic research ship and JS Suma were installed, and ocean observations were carried out with a system of four vessels.

Of these, this ship was planned as a substitute for the 42AGS, which was scheduled to be removed in the latter half of the 1990s, and was approved for construction in the 1996 plan based on the medium-term defense capability development plan.

== Design ==
In terms of design, it is said to be a performance-enhancing type of JS Wakasa, and the ship type has also the same long forecastle, but the displacement is increased by 1,000 tons or more. The same is true for the apparently distinctive bow bow sheave. In order to reduce wave-making resistance and prevent interference with underwater acoustic equipment at the bottom of the ship (acoustic obstruction due to air bubbles, etc.), a U-shaped frame is used for the bow and a V-shaped frame is used for the stern. Was done. The adoption of bulbous bow was the first for an ocean observation ship.

The observation side is on the starboard side, and the stern deck is used as the observation work deck in consideration of the effects of stools and waves of various equipment. An A-frame crane is installed at the stern and a break-action crane is installed at the center of the port side of the observation work deck in order to put the equipment into the sea and collect it. A telescopic crane is installed at the 2nd deck level. A rear control room is installed at the rear of the 1st deck for centralized monitoring and remote control of various equipment on the observation work deck, including break-action cranes. In addition, there is an equipment storage just below the observation work deck, which is connected by a lift.

As the anti-sway device, U-shaped tube type anti-sway tanks (ART) are installed on both sides of the central part of the 1st deck. The standard fin stabilizer on an escort ship is ineffective without a certain amount of footsteps, but the ocean observation ship has many opportunities to berth and observe due to the nature of its mission, so it can be effective even at low speeds. The tank method was chosen. In addition, this ART system is said to be a type called Stabilo Ace that automatically predicts and diminishes upset.

In addition, the crew of female SDF personnel is taken into consideration, and as a residential area for women, there is an officer's bedroom (for 2 people) near the officer's room on the 2nd deck and a staff's living area (for 8 people) in the central part of the 1st deck. It has been placed. Also, on this ship, as the first attempt as a self-defense ship, the design of her captain's room was ordered from a private designer, which is very excellent.

The engine compartment is divided into two compartments, a machine room and a propulsion motor room, and the cockpit and emergency command post is located on the second deck. A diesel-electric system is used for the main engine to reduce underwater radiation noise. It is equipped with two Mitsubishi Heavy Industries S16U diesel generators and one Mitsubishi S8U diesel generator as generators, and a variable pitch propeller is driven by two propulsion motors. In addition, these generators also serve as power supply to the propulsion generator and the onboard services, and will be an integrated electric propulsion system.

In order to reduce underwater radiation noise, the main engine and main generator are double anti-vibration support, and auxiliary equipment such as the hull is also anti-vibration support with anti-vibration rubber and anti-vibration pipe joints as with conventional ships. The vibration damping material is installed on the outer panel of the hull at the bottom of the ship. The variable-pitch propeller is also a large-diameter 5-wing high-skewed propeller, and the shaft rotation speed is also reduced. In order to suppress the shaft inclination as much as possible, the height of the propulsion motor itself was kept low and placed on the side as much as possible. In addition, it is equipped with two side thrusters on the bow (thrust of 9 tons each) and one on the stern (thrust of 12 tons) to improve low-speed motion performance in the presence of wind and tide.

== Equipment ==
For general ocean observation, it is equipped with a water temperature recorder, an ultrasonic Doppler multi-layer current meter, a moored self-recording current meter (AICM-2F), a shipboard meteorological observation device, and a microwave wave height meter. It is also equipped with a buoy suspension type sound wave propagation measuring device (WQM-10B), a subsidence type sound wave propagation measuring device (EMB), and a seafloor return loss measuring device (BLMS) for underwater acoustic observation. The equipment related to the laying of acoustic observation equipment is grouped in the front half of the ship, and a large sheave and gantry crane are installed on the bow.

Ocean surveying equipment includes a sea beam 2112 type multi-narrow beam sounder installed on the bottom of the bridge, a mud sampler, and a proton magnetometer (magnetic resonance magnetometer).

In order to process and analyze these observation data and collected specimens, the first observation room is set up behind the bridge at the 3rd deck level, and the second observation room is set up behind the first deck. Of these, the first observation room is equipped with an observation data integration processing device that can accurately edit and record so that post-processing on land is easy after adding metadata such as time and position to the collected data.

As for the onboard boats, 11-meter work boats are mounted on the dabit on the deck of the poop on both sides of the chimney, of which the port side boats are equipped with shallow sea echo sounders and towed side scan sonar. It is said to be an observation work boat.

In addition, it is equipped with a roped unmanned underwater vehicle (ROV) for underwater work such as cable repair. It is usually mounted on the deck room that is continuous with the deck of the ship tower, and is lifted and lowered by the A-frame crane at the stern. Made in the United States, it weighs about 5.5 tons in the air, has a total length of about 2.9 meters, a width of about 1.8 meters, and a height of about 2.4 meters. It is equipped with two manipulators and a water jet excavator as work equipment. She is said to have a pressure resistance of 1,000 meters and a working depth of 400 meters.

== Construction and career ==
Nichinan was laid down on 7 August 1997 and launched on 1 June 1998 by Mitsubishi Heavy Industries Shimonoseki Shipyard. She was commissioned on 24 March 1999 and was incorporated into the Marine Service Corps and deployed in Yokosuka.

In response to the Great East Japan Earthquake caused by the 2011 off the Pacific coast of Tohoku Earthquake, Yokosuka departed urgently to dispatch a disaster.

Around 2:00 pm on 30 November 2013, the cable of an unmanned underwater vehicle (ROV) was broken in the Tsugaru Straits, and it went missing. There was concern about the impact on the vehicle. The Maritime Self-Defense Force has neglected to report on this matter until 29 January 2014, when there was a newspaper report, and Defense Minister Itsunori Onodera has criticized the response.

On December 1, 2015, the Oceanographic Command Group was reorganized into the Oceanographic Command and Anti-submarine Support Group, and was incorporated into the 1st Oceanographic Observatory, which was newly formed under the same group.

At around 2:45 am on 20 July 2016, a 27-year-old male chief sailor disappeared while sailing about 30 km east of Amami Oshima in Kagoshima Prefecture. The chief officer searched by aircraft or ship, thinking that he might have fallen into the sea, but the search was terminated at 8:00 pm on July 27.

== Gallery ==
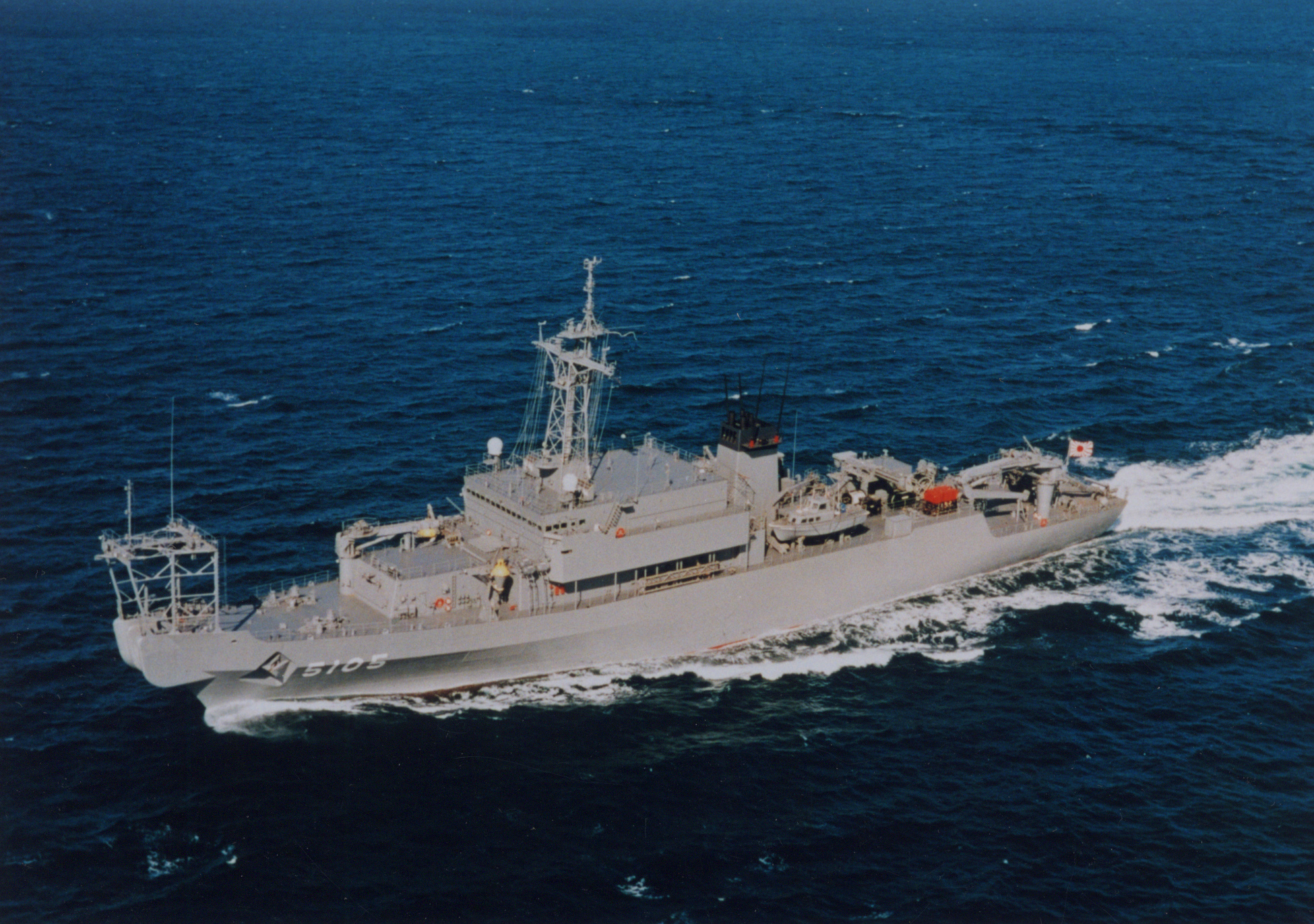
JS Nichinan underway, date unknown

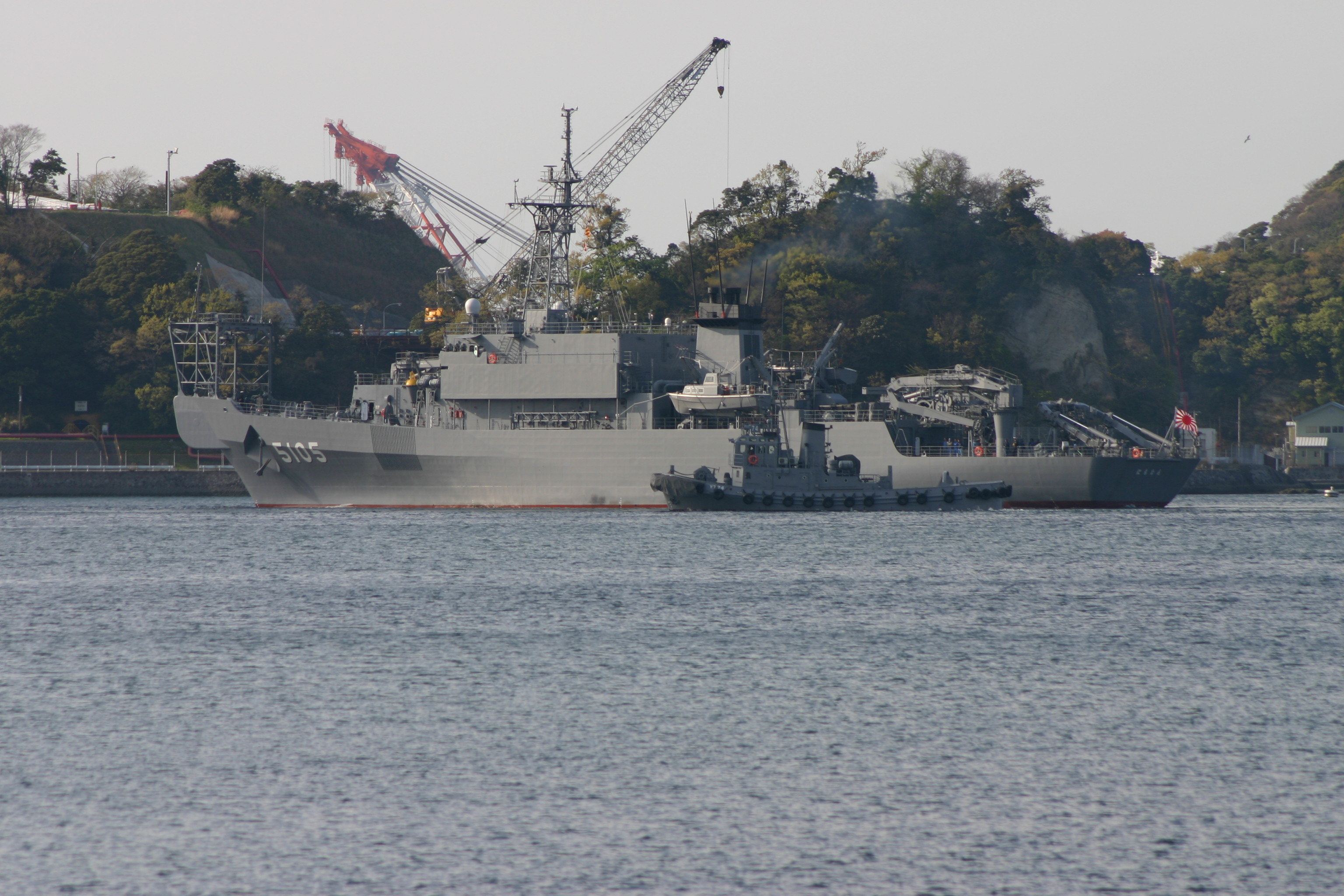
JS Nichinan on 9 April 2004

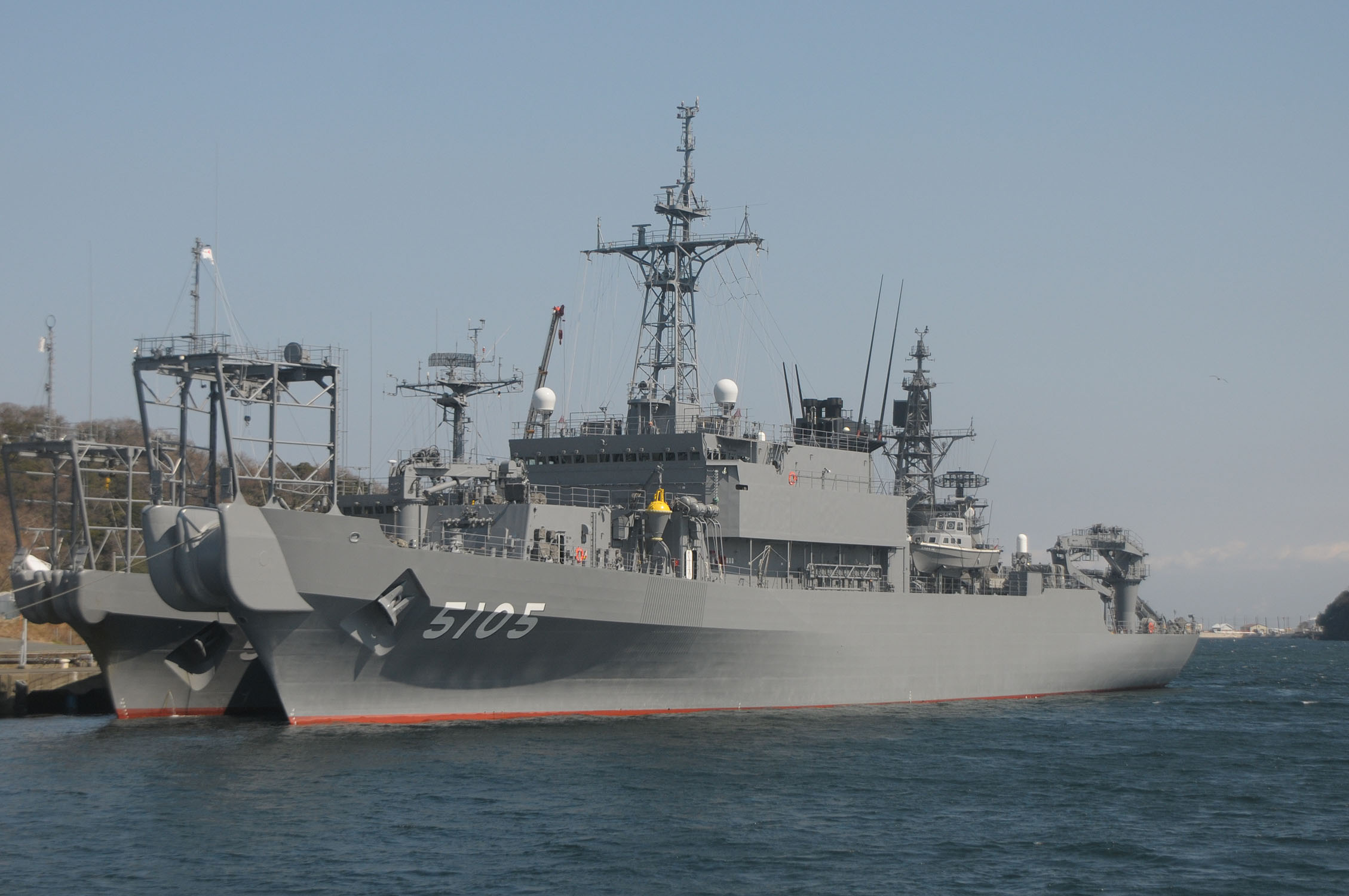
JS Nichinan on 3 March 2012

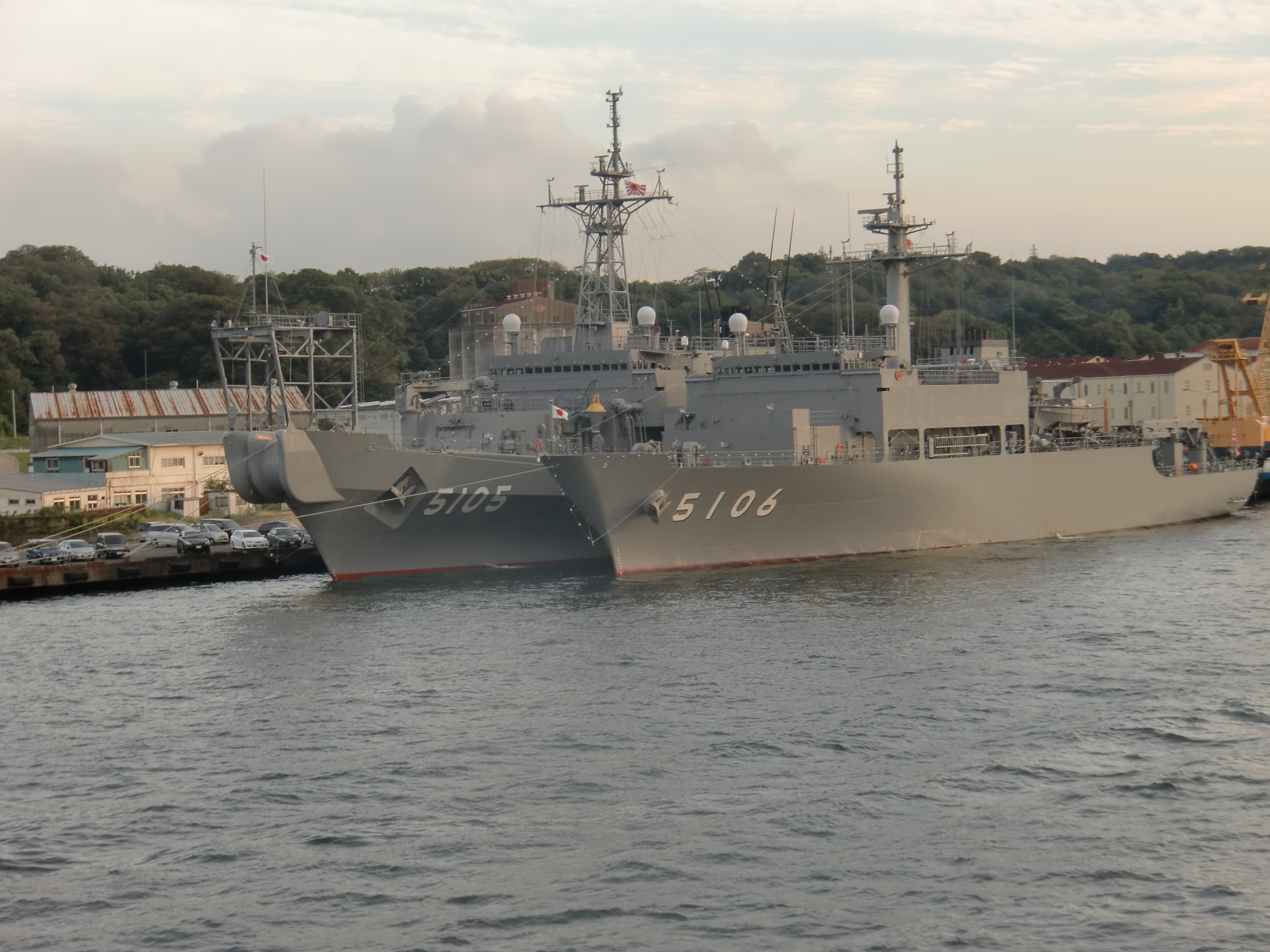
JS Nichinan and JS Shōnan on 11 October 2012

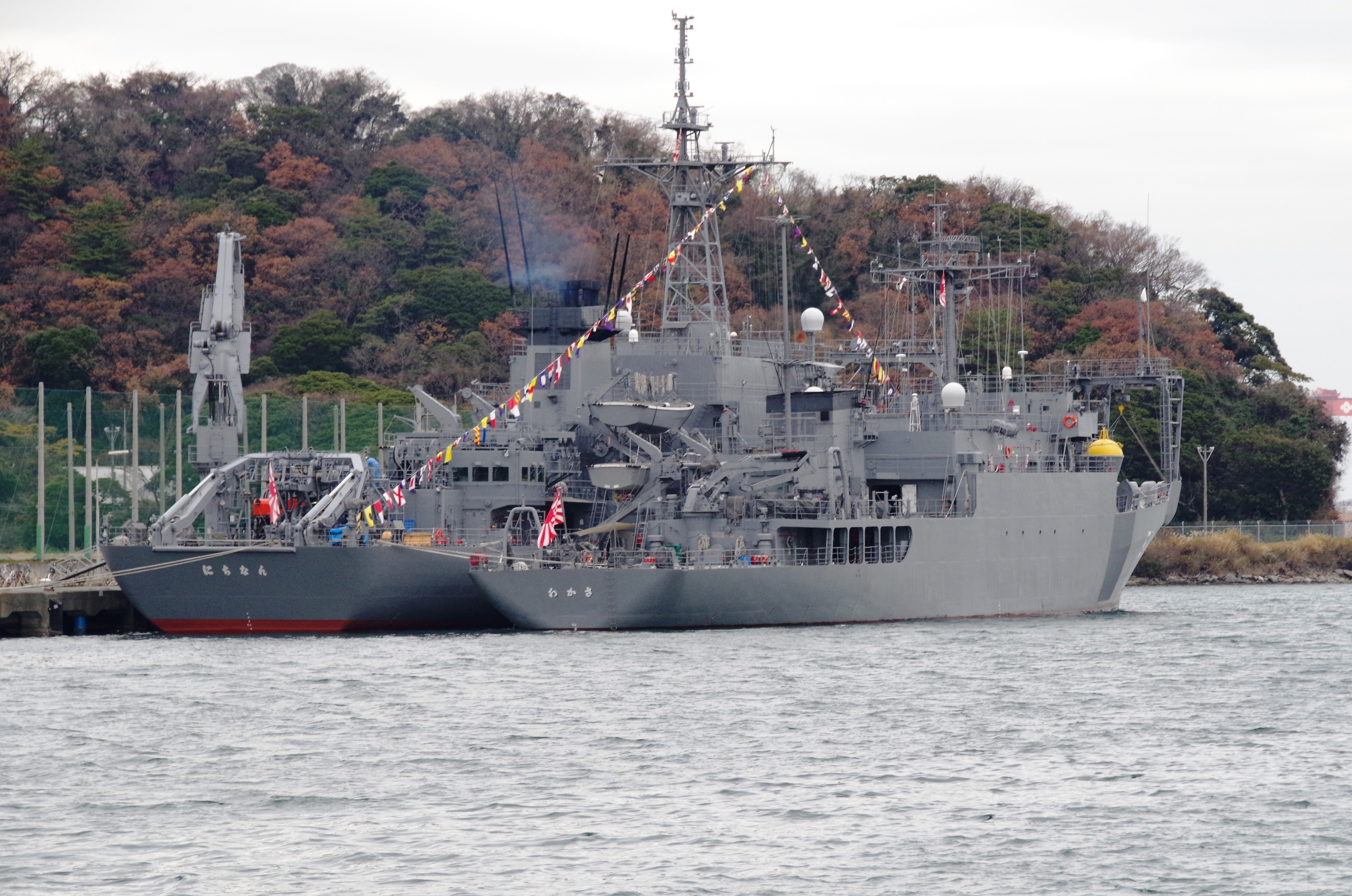
JS Wakasa and JS Nichinan on 23 December 2012

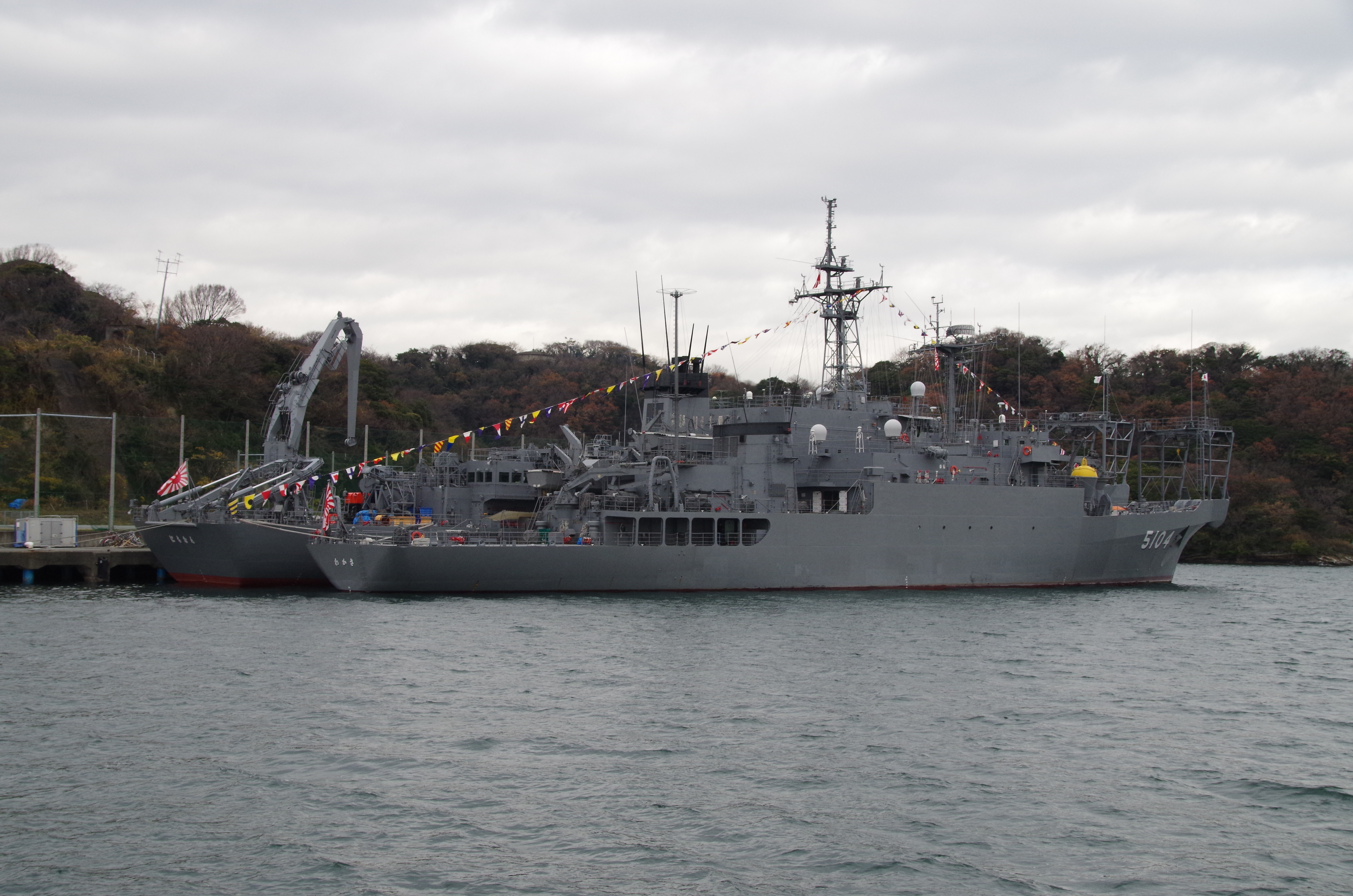

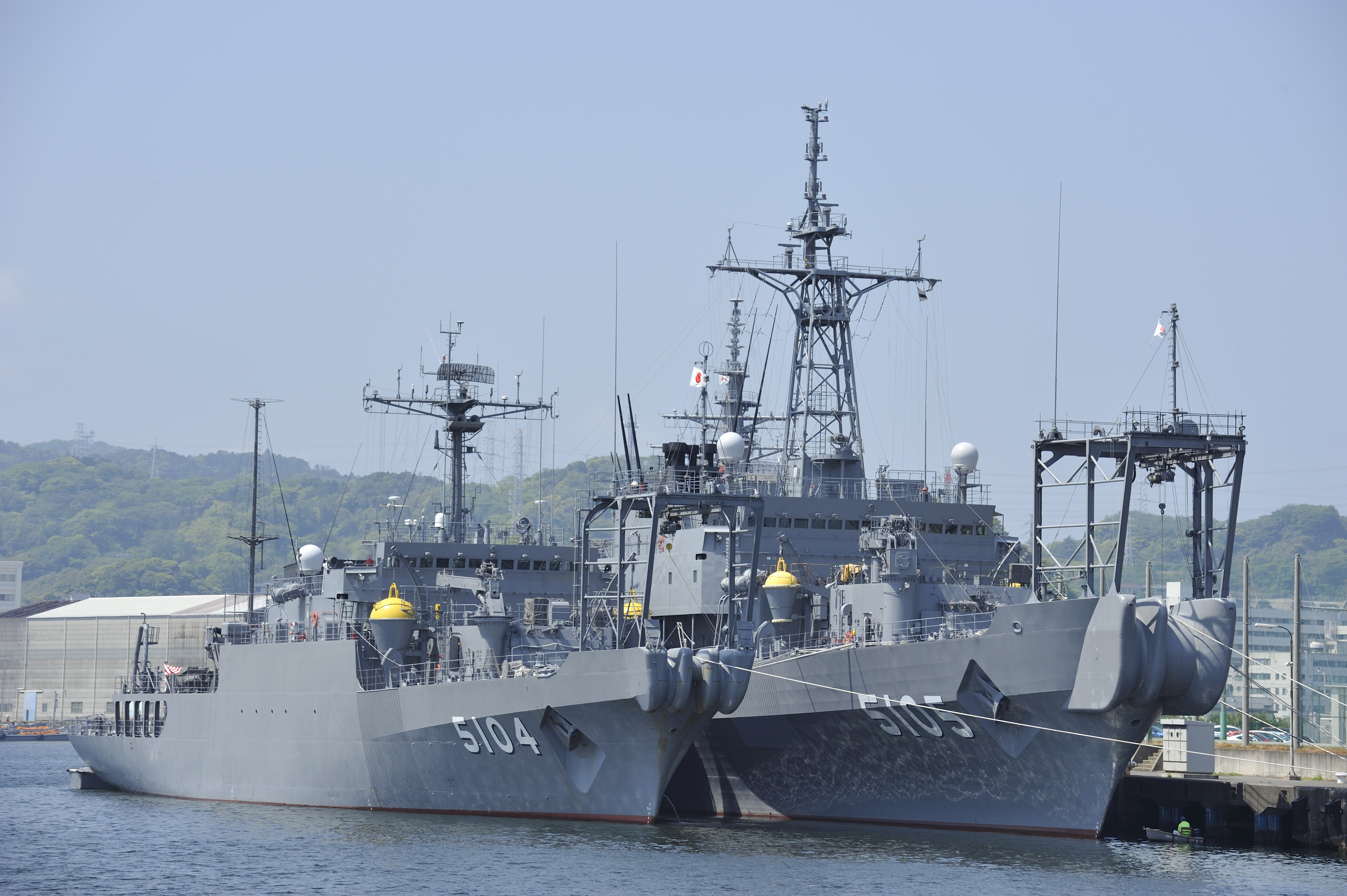
JS Wakasa and JS Nichinan on 27 April 2015

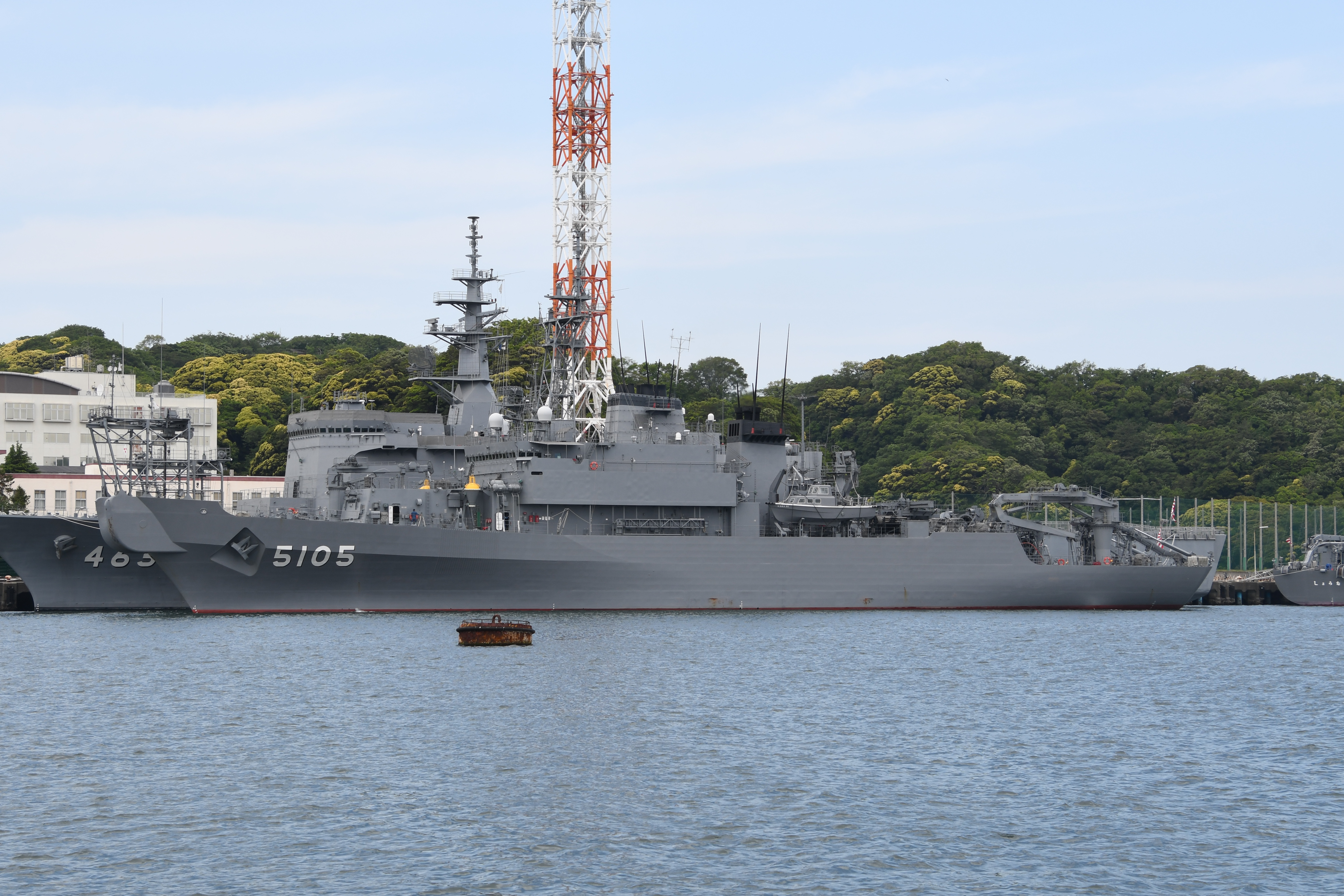
JS Nichinan on 30 April 2018

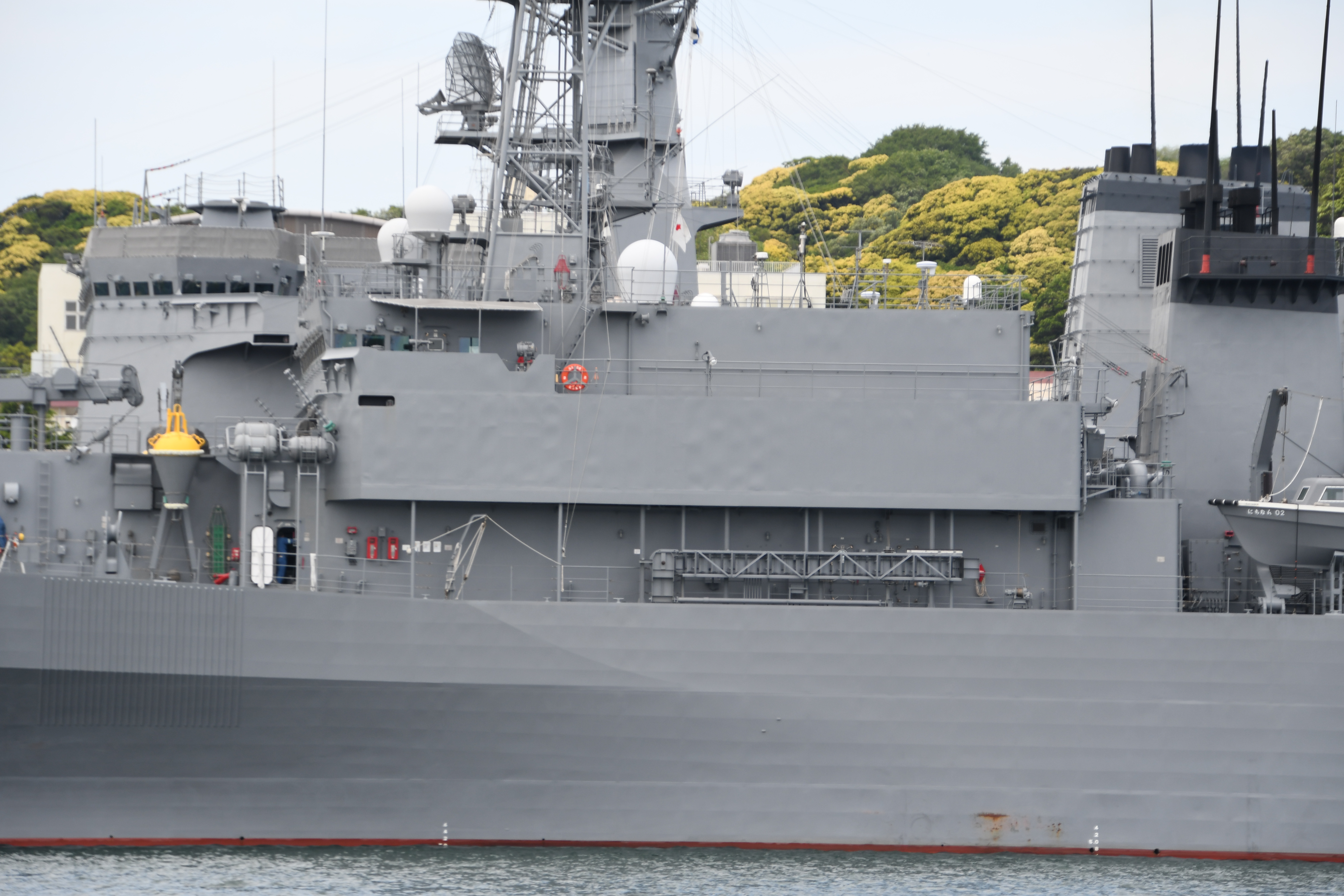

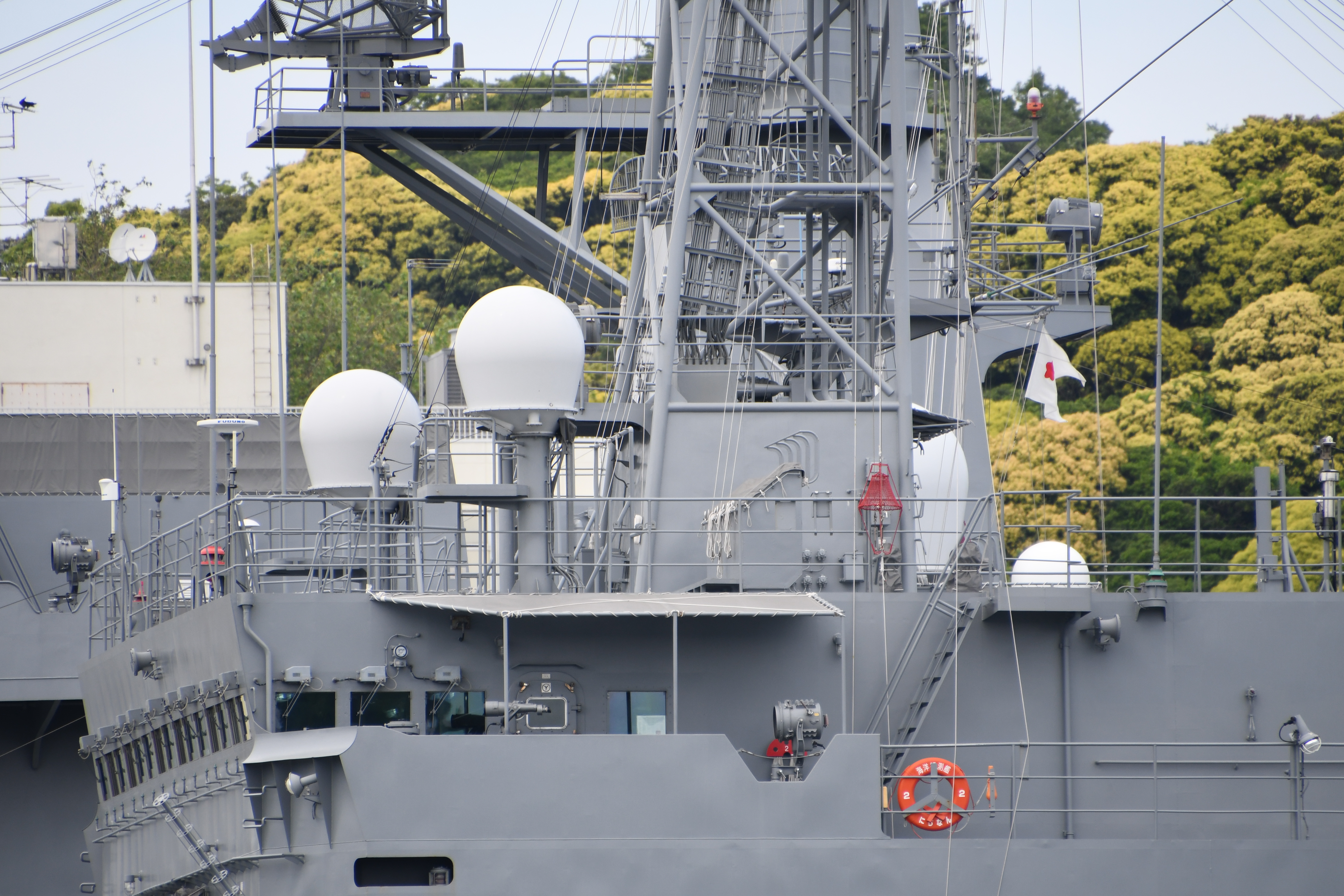

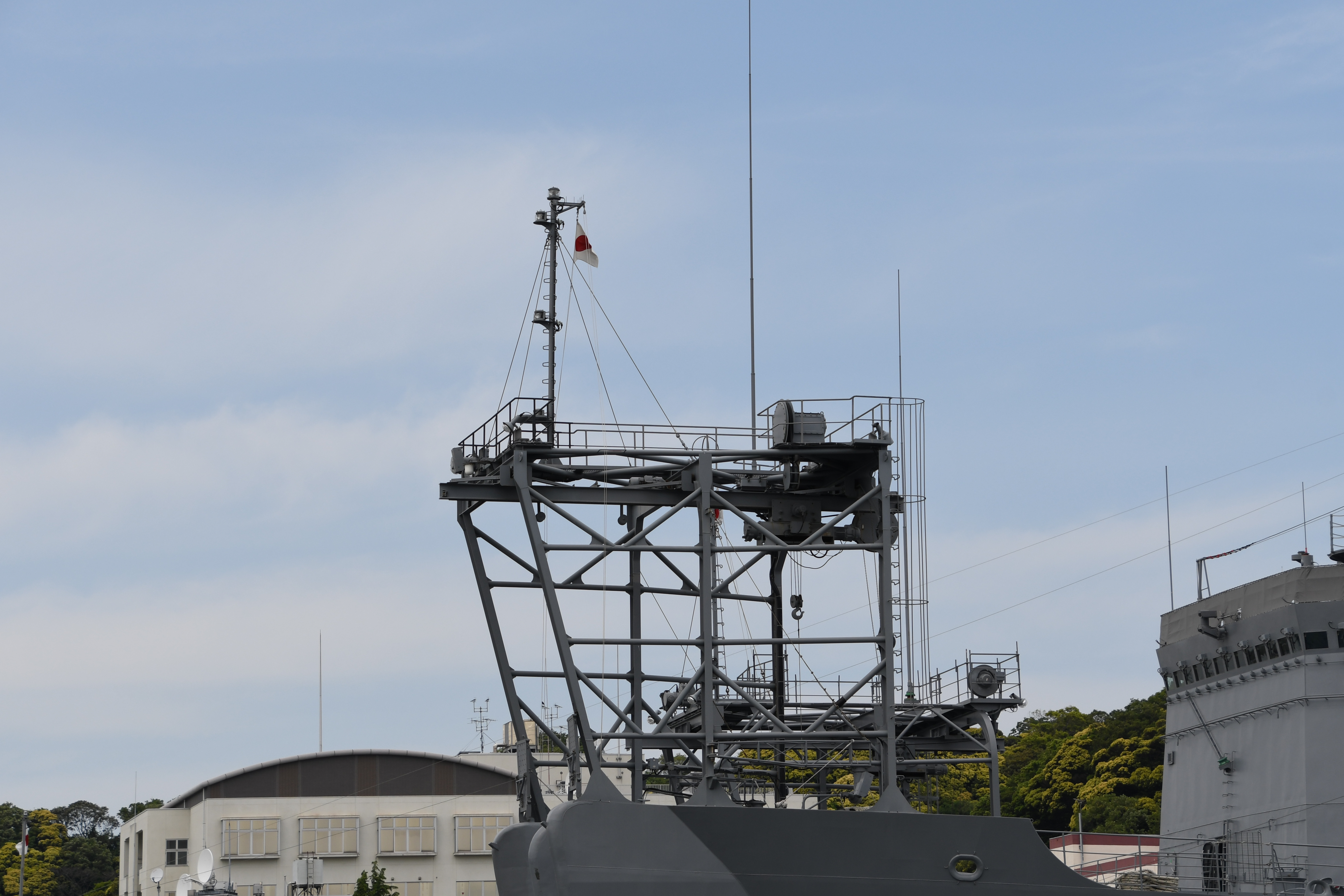
