= Futami-class oceanographic research ship =

Class of oceanographic research ship of JMSDF

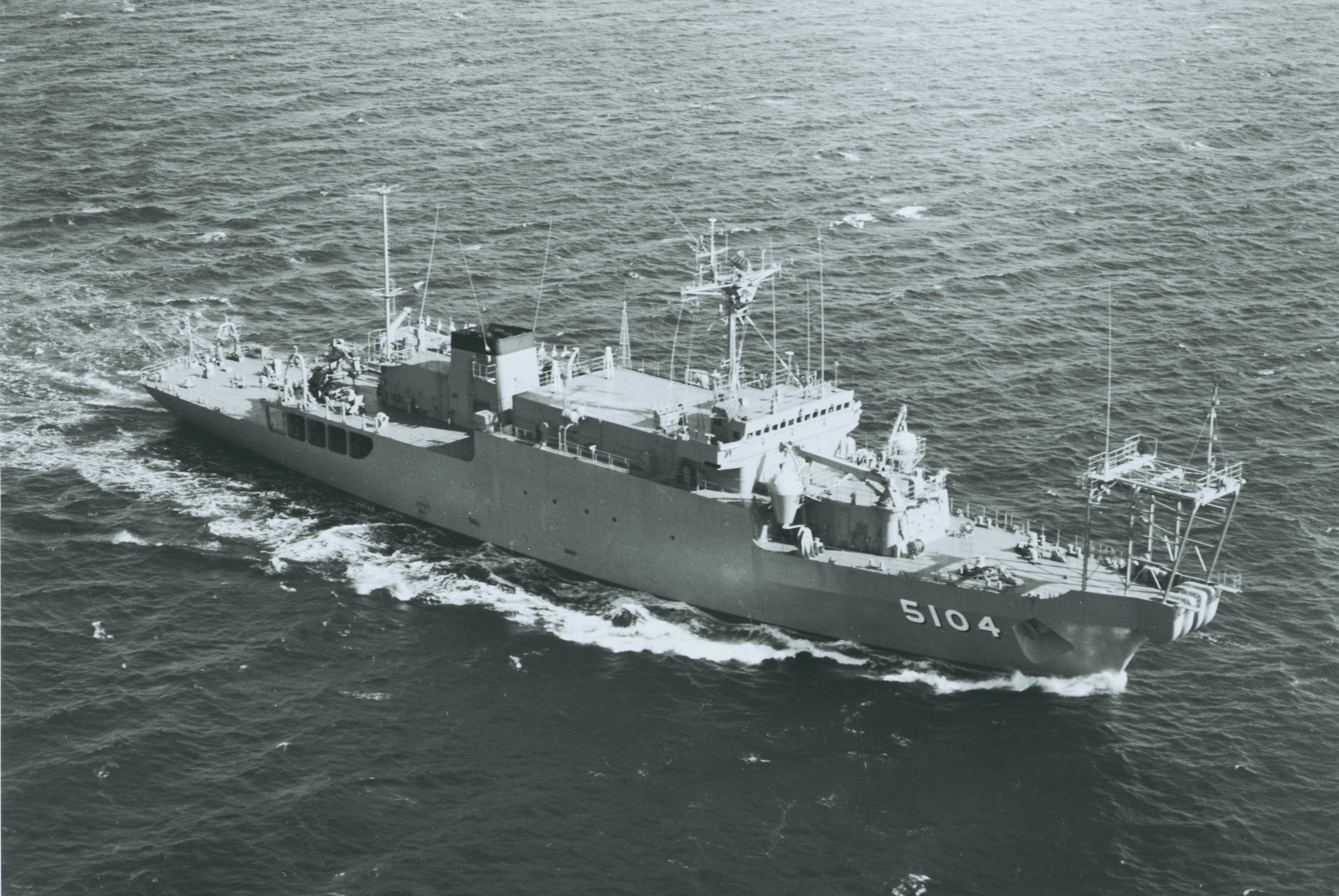
- JS Wakasa

Class overview
- Name: Futami
- Builders: Hitachi, Maizuru; Mitsubishi, Shimonoseki
- Preceded by: Akashi class
- Succeeded by: Nichinan class
- Built: 1978-1985
- In service: 1979-2026
- Planned: 2
- Completed: 2
- Active: 0
- Retired: 2

General characteristics
- Type: Oceanographic research ship
- Displacement: 2,050 t (2,020 long tons) standard; 3,200 t (3,100 long tons) full load
- Length: 97.0 m (318 ft 3 in)
- Beam: 15 m (49 ft 3 in)
- Draft: 4.3 m (14 ft 1 in)
- Depth: 7.6 m (24 ft 11 in)
- Propulsion: 2 × diesel electric engines; 2 × shafts
- Speed: 16 kn (30 km/h; 18 mph)
- Complement: 95–105
- Sensors & processing systems: OPS-18 surface-search radar

The Futami class was a class of oceanographic research ship of Japan Maritime Self-Defense Force (JMSDF) in the late 1970s.

== History ==
With the shift to passive anti-submarine warfare, the collection of marine environmental data is required for efficient execution of maritime operations, and seafloor topography / sediment, tidal currents / geomagnetism, and water temperature / salt content, etc. Marine weather was interrelated and needed to be measured precisely. For this reason, the Maritime Self-Defense Force built the JDS Akashi in the plan of 1967, and in 1969, it newly formed the Marine Operations Corps as its operation unit and started marine environment information activities.

However, it was difficult to build a sufficient information gathering system with one ship. For this reason, from 1974, five Kasado-class minesweepers were sequentially converted into marine observation boats and the construction of a dedicated marine observation ship was planned. Based on this, first, based on the Fourth Defense Build-up Plan, a 2,050-ton type marine observation ship was built in the 1976 plan and commissioned as JS Futami. After that, one more ship was built in the 1983 plan based on 56 middle-aged businesses, and commissioned as JS Wakasa.

== Design ==
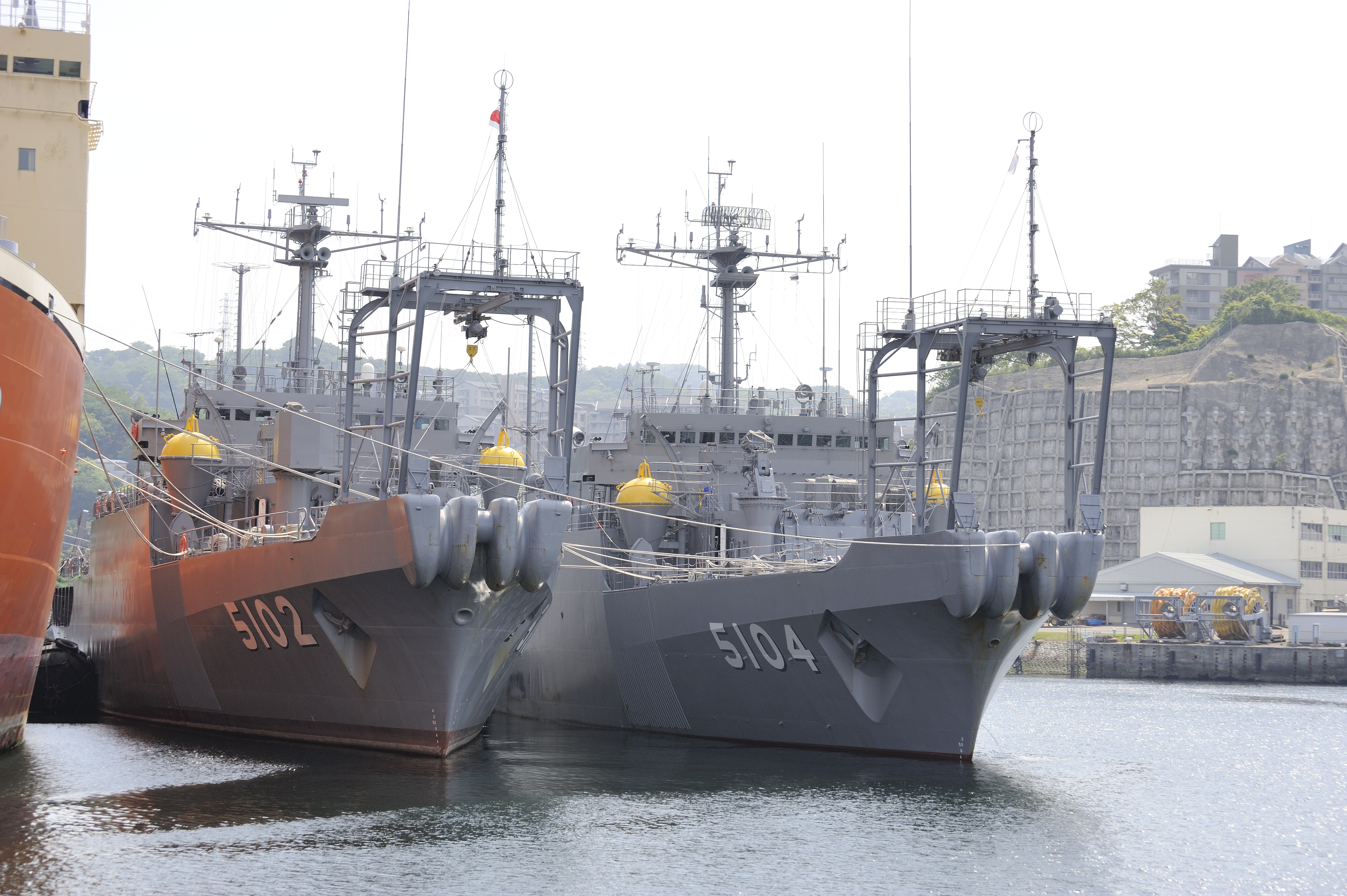
Futami (left) and Wakasa (right)

The hull type has a long forecast with two layers of all decks, and the hull design is a commercial ship structure. The observation side is on the starboard side, and the stern deck is used as the observation work deck in consideration of the effects of stools and waves of various equipment.

Compared to the Akashi, the acoustic observation capability has been strengthened, and in order to lay observation equipment and cables, a bow sheave and gantry similar to the laying ship are installed on the bow, but this is the subsequent ocean observation. It was followed by the ship and became a feature of appearance. The cable hoist is installed in the deck room just before the bridge structure, but here the upper deck (first deck) is the bottom and the 02 deck is the ceiling, ensuring a height of two layers. The cable tank is installed at the bottom of the ship below the bridge, and as the cable laying progresses, it becomes top heavy, so a seawater ballast tank is installed at the double bottom to ensure stability under any loading condition. To. It is also equipped with anti-sway tanks and bow thrusters for drifting or low-speed navigation.

As the main engine, the first ship was equipped with a V8 V22 / 30ATL diesel engine (single machine output 2,200 horsepower), which is a V8 engine of Kawasaki Heavy Industries MAN. This belonged to the VV22 / 30 series, which was common in auxiliary ships of this period, but the ships planned after 1979 were equipped with Fuji Diesel's L27.2XF series. From, the second ship was changed to the in-line 8-cylinder Fuji 8L27.5XF diesel engine (single machine output 2,250 horsepower) connected to this lineage. For acoustic observation, various underwater radiation noise reduction measures have been taken inside the ship and the main engine also employs a highly elastic rubber joint and a variable pitch propeller driven via a reducer.

It also has one gas turbine generator and three diesel generators as power sources, with a total output of 1,800 kW. The prime mover for the gas turbine main generator was an OEM-produced IME831-800 gas turbine engine from Garrett of the United States, which was installed by Shinko Engineering Company.

== Equipment ==
A control room and an observation room are located on the 2nd deck directly under the bridge, and precision ship position measuring equipment, precision acoustic measuring equipment, submarine sound wave exploration equipment, various recorders, analysis equipment, Loran C, etc. are arranged.

A break-action crane (with a capacity of 3 tons) is installed at the front end of the observation deck, and a retractable gallows is installed in front of the starboard side and at the stern. At the rear, there is an electromagnetic ocean current meter, a magnetometer, a hoisting machine such as a water temperature recorder, and a water temperature detection weight drop machine. There are also four large and small hoisting machines at the rear end of the 1st deck, which is just before the observation work deck.

As onboard boats, one 11-meter work boat and one 7.9-meter internal fire boat will be installed. She is also said to be equipped with an American-made RCV-225 ROV for underwater work.

== Ships of class ==
Pennant no.	Name	Builder	Laid down	Launched	Commissioned	Decommissioned
AGS-5102	Futami	Mitsubishi Heavy Industries, Shimonoseki	20 January 1978	9 August 1978	27 February 1979	17 March 2010
AGS-5104	Wakasa	Hitachi Zosen Corporation, Maizuru	21 August 1984	21 May 1985	25 February 1986	19 March 2026
