= JDS Akashi =

Oceanographic research ship of JMSDF

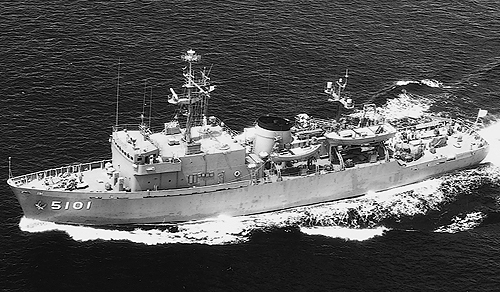
- JDS Akashi

History

Japan
- Name: Akashi; (あかし)
- Namesake: Akashi
- Ordered: 1967
- Builder: Hitachi, Maizuru
- Laid down: 21 September 1968
- Launched: 30 May 1969
- Commissioned: 25 October 1969
- Decommissioned: 24 March 1999
- Home port: Yokosuka
- Identification: Pennant number: AGS-5101
- Fate: Unknown

Class overview
- Preceded by: N/A
- Succeeded by: Futami class

General characteristics
- Type: Oceanographic research ship
- Displacement: 1,420 t (1,400 long tons) standard; 1,750 t (1,720 long tons) full load
- Length: 74.0 m (242 ft 9 in)
- Beam: 13 m (42 ft 8 in)
- Draft: 4.3 m (14 ft 1 in)
- Depth: 6.6 m (21 ft 8 in)
- Propulsion: 2 × Kawasaki MAN V6 V22 / 30ATL diesel electric engines; 2 × shafts
- Speed: 16 kn (30 km/h; 18 mph)
- Complement: 70–80
- Sensors & processing systems: OPS-9 surface-search radar
- Electronic warfare & decoys: NOLR-5

JDS Akashi (AGS-5101) was an oceanographic research ship of Japan Maritime Self-Defense Force (JMSDF) in the late 1960s.

== History ==
In Japan before World War II, the Imperial Japanese Navy Hydrographic Department was engaged in marine surveying and observation missions, but after the war, after the Ministry of Transport, it became a subordinate with the establishment of the Japan Coast Guard. Due to the transition (currently the Marine Information Department), the Maritime Self-Defense Force, which was established after that, did not have a ship specializing in marine surveying and observation missions. However, with the passive warfare of anti-submarine warfare, the collection of marine environmental data is required for efficient execution of maritime operations, and seafloor topography / sediment, tidal currents / geomagnetism, and water temperature / salt content and marine weather, etc. were interrelated and needed to be measured precisely.

As for the ocean observation of the Maritime Self-Defense Force, the scheduled BT observation during the voyage was first started in 1961 by the ship equipped with the self-recorded seawater temperature recorder (BT), and the BT report based on the observation data was started from the following year. After that, BT observations for anti-submarine warfare were carried out by escort vessels and submarine chasers, and marine surveys for installing underwater fixed equipment and minesweeper surveys for anti-submarine warfare were carried out by minesweepers. However, as research progressed and the required observation elements and observation depths increased, it became difficult to equip escort vessels with equipment for that purpose. The national government also established the Maritime Science and Technology Council in 1961 to strengthen the ocean observation system of each government agency and institution, and in 1969, a joint Kuroshio survey of nine-country cooperation is planned. As a result, expectations for the construction of an observation ship have come to the Maritime Self-Defense Force from related parties.

For this reason, the JMSDF was planned as the first ship dedicated to ocean observation. The former Navy had Tsukushi as the first and last dedicated surveying ship.

== Design ==
At the beginning of the formulation of the Third Defense Build-up Plan, the smallest scale of 700 tons, speed of 12 knots, and about 58 crew members were considered. However, this scale was inadequate for winter operations in the North Pacific, eventually resulting in a 1,420-ton ship.

The hull type is a long poop deck with bulwark from the bow to the center of the hull, and the hull design is a commercial ship structure. The waterline has an ice-resistant structure. Since the starboard side is the observation side, the bow tower on this side is shortened, and the work deck flush with the stern deck continues to just below the chimney like a walking deck. Observation equipment was installed in the center of the starboard side, while internal fire boats and work boats were installed on the port side. It was equipped with various dabits and winches, including two cranes on the stern work deck (capacity 5 tons and 1 ton) for the introduction and collection of observation equipment.

The main engine was a V6 V22 / 30ATL diesel engine (single machine output 1,600 horsepower), which is a V6 engine of Kawasaki Heavy Industries MAN. This belongs to the genealogy of the VV22 / 30 series developed by MAN, but the series aircraft became a common model for auxiliary ships built after the same year's plan. Also, due to the nature of the mission, it cruised at 14 knots and had a cruising range of 16,500 nautical miles (about 30,000 km), which is the longest cruising range of conventional Maritime Self-Defense Force vessels.

== Construction and career ==
Akashi was laid down on 21 September 1968 and launched on 30 May 1969 by Hitachi Zosen Corporation Maizuru Shipyard. She was commissioned on 25 October 1969 and was incorporated into the Marine Service Corps and deployed in Yokosuka.

In 1975, an electronic warfare device was added.

On March 17, 1980, the Oceanographic Command was reorganized into the Oceanographic Command.

She was decommissioned on March 24, 1999. Her total distance traveled was about 680,000 nautical miles, and her marine observation missions were 194 times, spanning 3,011 days.
