= USS Wasp (LHD-1) =

US Navy amphibious assault ship

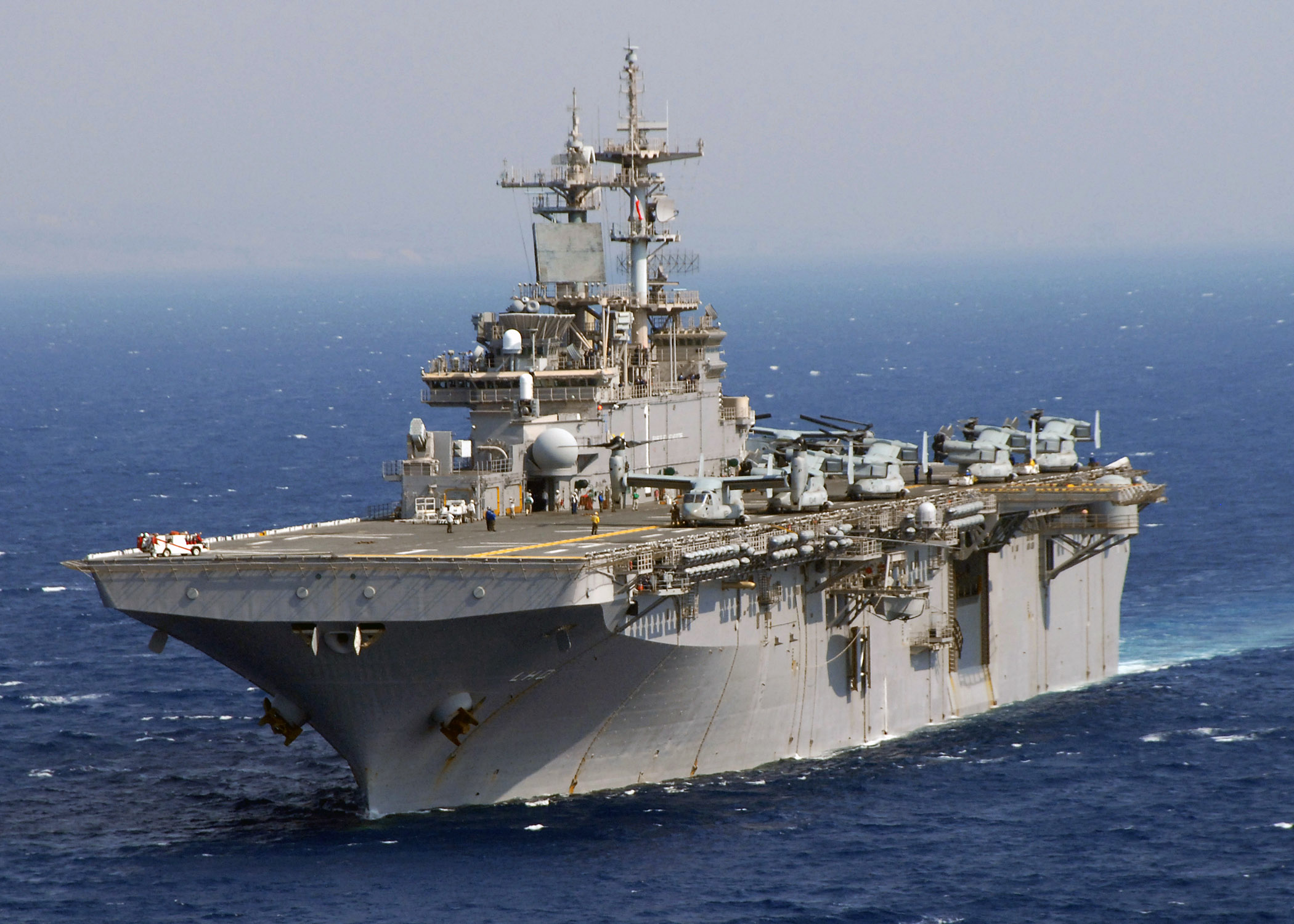
- USS Wasp (LHD-1)

History

United States
- Name: Wasp
- Namesake: USS Wasp (CV-18)
- Awarded: 28 February 1984
- Builder: Ingalls Shipbuilding
- Laid down: 30 May 1985
- Launched: 4 August 1987
- Commissioned: 29 July 1989
- Home port: Norfolk
- Identification: MMSI number: 366000001; Callsign: NEBP; Hull number: LHD-1
- Motto: Honor, Tradition, Excellence
- Nickname(s): Building 1
- Status: in active service
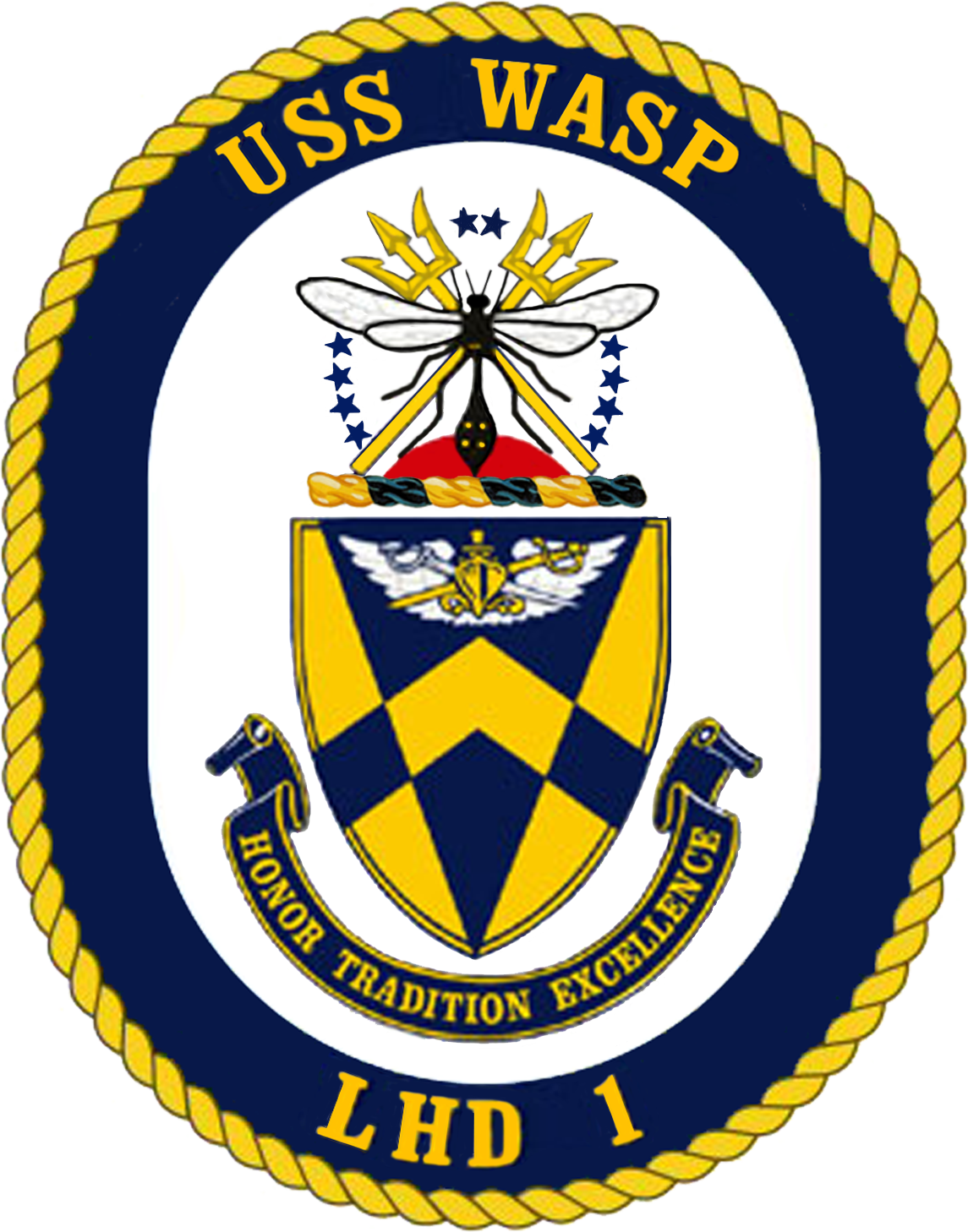
- Badge

General characteristics
- Type: Wasp-class amphibious assault ship
- Displacement: 40,500 long tons (41,150 t) full load
- Length: 846 ft (258 m)
- Beam: 104 ft (31.8 m)
- Draft: 27 ft (8.1 m)
- Propulsion: Two boilers, two geared steam turbines, two shafts, 70,000 shp (52,000 kW);
- Speed: 22 knots (41 km/h; 25 mph)
- Range: 9,500 nautical miles (17,600 km; 10,900 mi) at 18 kn (33 km/h; 21 mph)
- Well deck dimensions: 266-by-50-foot (81 by 15.2 m) by 28-foot (8.5 m) high
- Boats & landing craft carried: 3 Landing Craft Air Cushion or; 2 Landing Craft Utility or; 12 Landing Craft Mechanized
- Troops: 1,687 troops (plus 184 surge) Marine Detachment
- Complement: 66 officers, 1,004 enlisted
- Sensors & processing systems: 1 AN/SPS-49 2-D Air Search Radar; 1 AN/SPS-48 3-D Air Search Radar; 1 AN/SPS-67 Surface Search Radar; 1 Mk23 Target Acquisition System (TAS); 1 AN/SPN-43 Marshalling Air Traffic Control Radar; 1 AN/SPN-35 Air Traffic Control Radar; 1 AN/URN-25 TACAN system; 1 AN/UPX-24 Identification Friend Foe
- Armament: Two RIM-116 Rolling Airframe Missile launchers; Two RIM-7 Sea Sparrow missile launchers; Three 20 mm Phalanx CIWS systems; Four 25 mm Mk 38 chain guns; Four .50 BMG machine guns
- Aircraft carried: Actual mix depends on the mission; Standard Complement: 6 AV-8B Harrier II attack aircraft; or; 6 F-35B Lightning II stealth strike-fighters; 4 AH-1W/Z Super Cobra/Viper attack helicopter; 12 MV-22B Osprey assault support tiltrotor; 4 CH-53E Super Stallion heavy-lift helicopters; 3–4 UH-1Y Venom utility helicopters; Assault: 22+ MV-22B Osprey assault support tiltrotor; Sea Control: 20 AV-8B Harrier II attack aircraft; or; 20 F-35B Lightning II stealth strike-fighters; 6 SH-60F/HH-60H ASW helicopters

USS Wasp (LHD-1) is a United States Navy multipurpose amphibious assault ship, and the lead ship of her class. She is the tenth USN vessel to bear the name since 1775, with the last two ships named Wasp being aircraft carriers. She was built by the Ingalls Shipbuilding division of Litton in Pascagoula, Mississippi.

Wasp and her sister ships are the first specifically designed to accommodate new Landing Craft Air Cushion (LCAC) for fast troop movement over the beach, and Harrier II (AV-8B) Vertical/Short Take-Off and Landing (V/STOL) jets which provide close air support for the assault force. She can also accommodate the full range of Navy and Marine Corps helicopters, the tiltrotor MV-22 Osprey, the F-35B Lightning II multi-role fighter, conventional landing craft, and amphibious vehicles.

== Specifications ==
To carry out her primary mission, Wasp has an assault support system that synchronizes the simultaneous horizontal and vertical flow of troops, cargo and vehicles throughout the ship. Two aircraft elevators service the hangar bay and flight deck. Six cargo elevators, each 4 by 8 meters (13 by 26 ft), are used to transport material and supplies from the 3,000-cubic-meter (110,000 ft^{3}) cargo holds throughout the ship to staging areas on the flight deck, hangar bay and vehicle storage area. Cargo is transferred to waiting landing craft docked within the ship's 12,000-square-foot (1,100 m^{2}), 81-meter-long (266 ft) well deck. Helicopters in the hangar bay or on the flight deck are cargo-loaded by forklift.

=== Medical facilities ===
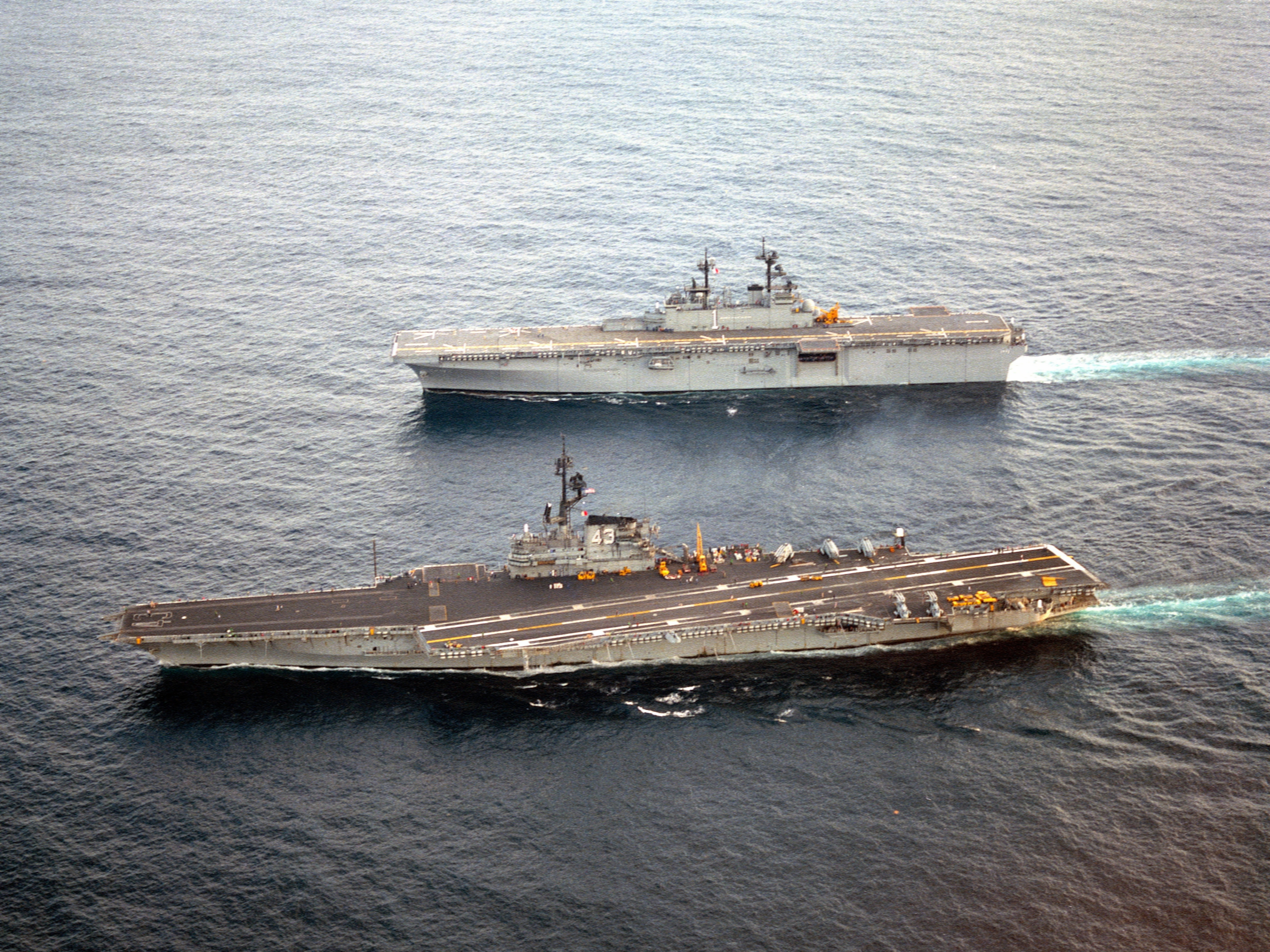
Wasp cruising alongside the aircraft carrier Coral Sea in September 1989

Wasp has medical and dental facilities capable of providing intensive medical assistance to 600 casualties, whether combat incurred or brought aboard ship during humanitarian missions. The ship's corpsmen also provide routine medical/dental care to the crew and embarked personnel. Major medical facilities include four main and two emergency operating rooms, four dental operating rooms, x-ray rooms, a blood bank, laboratories, and patient wards. In addition, three battle dressing stations are located throughout the ship, as well as a casualty collecting area at the flight deck level. Medical elevators rapidly transfer casualties from the flight deck and hangar bay to the medical facilities.

=== Accommodations ===
For the comfort of the 1,075 crewmembers and 2,200 embarked troops, all crewed spaces and berthing areas are individually heated and air conditioned. Berthing areas are subdivided to provide semi-private spaces without adversely affecting efficiency. Onboard recreational facilities include a Library Multi-Media Resource Center with Internet access, a weight room, and satellite television capabilities.

=== Propulsion ===
Wasp's two steam propulsion plants generate a total of 400 tons of steam per hour. The propulsion system develops 70,000 shaft horsepower (52 MW), powering the ship to speeds in excess of 22 knots (41 km/h; 25 mph). USS Wasp was built using more than 21,000 tons of steel, 400 tons of aluminum, 400 miles (640 km) of electrical/electronic cables, 80 miles (130 km) of piping and tubing of various types and sizes, and 10 miles (16 km) of ventilation ducting. Wasp weighed more than 27,000 tons when moved onto the Ingalls floating dry-dock on 30 July 1987 for launch on 4 August 1987, becoming the largest man-made object rolled across land. In 1996, the ship was fitted with the Advanced Combat Direction System (ACDS).

== Ship history ==
=== 1990s ===
On 20 June 1991, Wasp departed homeport for her maiden six-month Mediterranean deployment. In February 1993, she left her port on an emergency deployment to Somalia to participate in the United Nations intervention: Operation Restore Hope. Chairman of the Joint Chiefs of Staff, General Colin Powell landed on the ship that April for a discussion of military tactics taking place in and around Mogadishu. Following that, she assisted with another operation off the coast of Kuwait. She later made stops in Toulon, France, and Rota, Spain, en route to her home port in Norfolk, Virginia. In 1998, she won the Marjorie Sterrett Battleship Fund Award for the Atlantic Fleet.

=== 2000s ===
With the exception of deployments noted below, from 2004 to 2012, Wasp was not deployed as often or as long as other LHDs, as she was assigned to Joint Strike Fighter F-35B Lightning II testing and kept close to the U.S. as much as possible.

Operation Enduring Freedom, Operation Iraqi Freedom

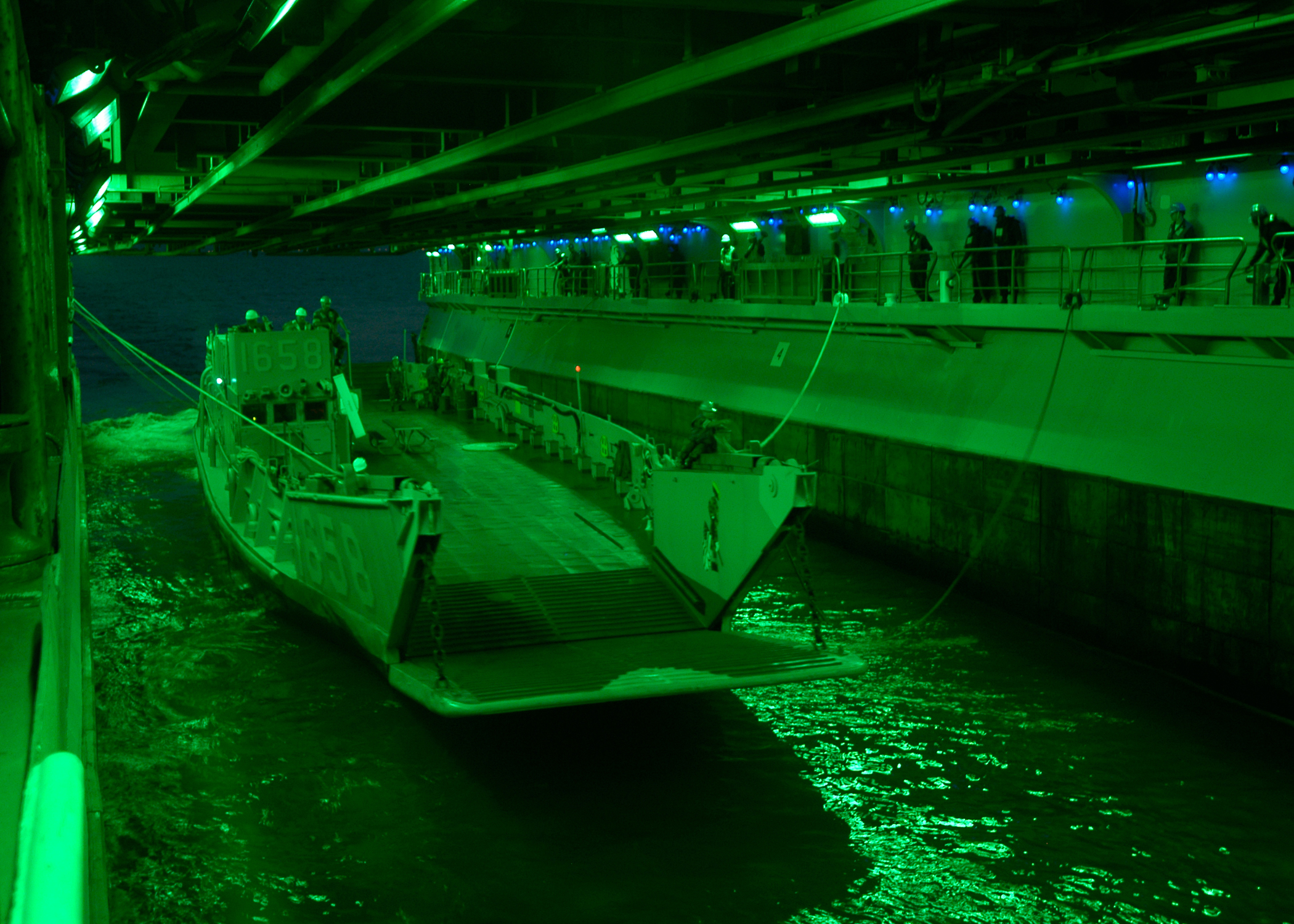
A Boatswain's Mate directs a Landing Craft Utility during wet well operations on board USS Wasp

In February 2004, Wasp set sail to take the Marines of 1/6 Marine Regiment and HMM-266 Rein to Afghanistan. They arrived at the end of March to offload the Marines, then returned to the U.S. to pick up more Marines from HMH-461 and transported them to Djibouti. After offloading HMH-461 in Djibouti, they picked up the Marines of HMM-266 Rein from Kuwait in August 2004, and returned to Norfolk, Virginia mid-September 2004. On 7 July 2006, Vice President Dick Cheney visited Wasp. He gave a speech honoring the efforts of the USS Nassau Expeditionary Strike Group in Operation Iraqi Freedom.

Wasp was the first ship to deploy the V-22 Osprey, doing so in October 2007, by carrying VMM-263's ten MV-22B Ospreys to Iraq to participate in Operation Iraqi Freedom. Wasp also served as the platform for the program's first Sea Trials in December 1990, involving the third and fourth Osprey prototypes. Wasp was the principal attraction at Fleet Week 2007 in New York City.

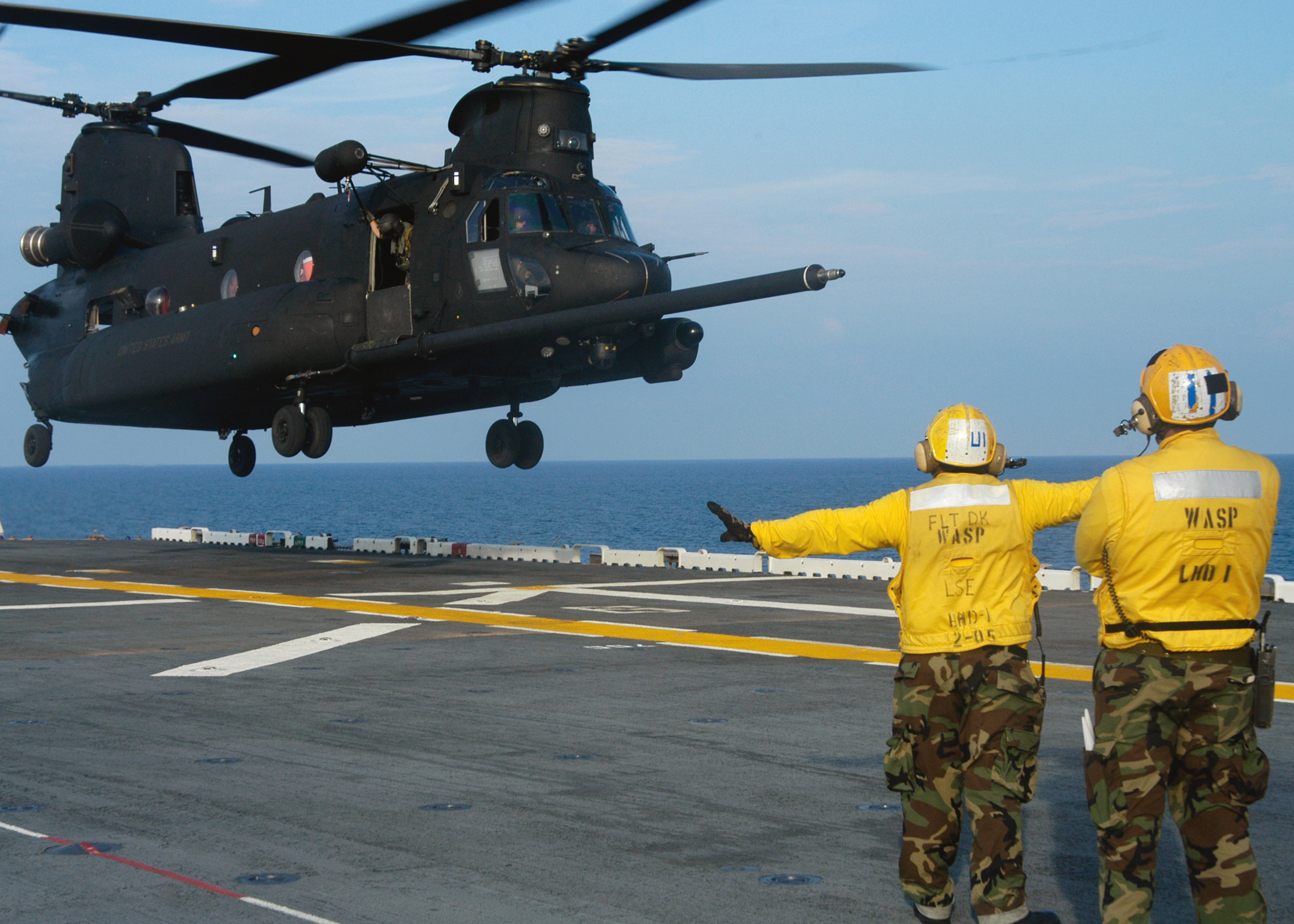
MH-47 Chinook takes off from Wasp

On 4 October 2009, Wasp deployed from her base at Norfolk Naval Station in Norfolk, Virginia on a three-month voyage down the Atlantic coast to the Caribbean, with Destroyer Squadron 40 and an embarked Marine Air-Ground Task Force. The 1,100 sailors and 365 embarked Marines conducted operations and exercises in the U.S. 4th Fleet area of responsibility. The operation, called Southern Partnership Station, is part of a maritime strategy, which focuses on building interoperability and cooperation in the region while meeting common challenges. In mid-October 2009, Wasp set anchor at the Guantanamo Bay Naval Base in Cuba and disembarked Marines who were assigned to training status for approximately three months while Wasp went underway.

=== 2010s ===
Video of a USMC F-35B conducting the first vertical landing on a flight deck aboard Wasp on 3 October 2011

In September 2007, Wasp sailed to Nicaragua to offer assistance to the victims of Hurricane Felix. On 29 June 2010, Wasp was one of the 18 international vessels taking part in the 100th anniversary celebrations of the Canadian Navy in Halifax, Nova Scotia. The Canadian and international warships were reviewed by Queen Elizabeth II, the Duke of Edinburgh, and Prime Minister Stephen Harper. In 2011, Wasp was modified for F-35B testing, including replacing a Sea Sparrow launcher with monitoring equipment. She returned to sea on 7 July 2011. On 3 October 2011, the F-35B made its first vertical landing at sea on Wasp. On 5 October 2011, Wasp successfully launched her first F-35B.

On 30 January 2012, Wasp set sail for Operation Bold Alligator, the largest amphibious exercise conducted by U.S. forces in the last decade. The exercise took place from 30 January to 12 February, both afloat and ashore in and around Virginia and North Carolina. In May 2012, Wasp participated in New York's Fleet Week, docking at Pier 92 on the Hudson River and offering tours of the ship to the general public. In July 2012, Wasp visited Boston for Fleet Week 2012 and Fourth of July festivities. On 30 October 2012, Wasp was sent towards the Hurricane Sandy impact area in case the USN was needed to support the disaster relief efforts. In June 2016, Wasp deployed for a six-month tour to the Middle East In October 2016, the US Navy announced that Wasp would deploy to Sasebo, Japan in late 2017, replacing her sister ship Bonhomme Richard, which will be moved to San Diego, California. On 1 August 2016, Marine AV-8B Harriers from Wasp began strikes against the Islamic State of Iraq and the Levant in Libya as part of crewed and uncrewed airstrikes on targets near Sirte, launching at least five times within two days.

The USN planned to deploy Wasp to the Asia-Pacific region in 2017 with a squadron of 16 F-35Bs. In September 2017, Wasp became the first U.S. warship to arrive in the Caribbean to provide supplies, damage assessment, and evacuation assistance in the wake of Hurricane Irma. On 3 March 2018, Wasp departed Sasebo, Japan for a routine patrol of the Indo-Pacific region. A detachment of 6 F-35Bs from VMFA-121 were deployed with the ship, marking the first operational shipboard deployment for the F-35B.

On 27 May 2019, President Donald Trump landed in a helicopter aboard the Wasp anchored near Yokosuka, Japan to deliver Memorial Day remarks to the troops during his visit to Japan for a state dinner with Emperor of Japan, Emperor Naruhito and Japanese Prime Minister, Shinzo Abe.

=== 2020s ===
From early 2021 through July 2022, Wasp underwent a comprehensive refurbishment at BAE Systems Platforms & Services.

In September 2024, U.S. service members embarked aboard the Wasp were the victims of an assault in İzmir, Turkey.

== Coat of arms ==
Dark blue and gold are the traditional colors of the US Navy. Blue alludes to the sea, the theater of Naval Operations. Gold is for excellence. The chevron, a traditional symbol for support, represents the amphibious assault mission of the ship. It resembles a wave move to shore and refers to the deployment of men, women and cargo. The wings highlight USS Wasp's aviation heritage and capabilities. The modern ship with crossed officers sword and enlisted cutlass adapted from the surface warfare emblems represents leadership, teamwork and the ship's mission in surface operations. The pile of a sharp pointed "V" shape is expressive of assault, combat readiness and victory. The wasp, with its well-developed wings and ability to administer painful stings, epitomizes quick striking power. The stars recall two of the previous ships named Wasp, CV-7 and CV-18, aircraft carriers that earned two and eight battle stars respectively for World War II service. The red disc or sun refers to World War II Japan and the Pacific Theater where these aircraft carriers saw heavy combat action. The tridents are symbolic of sea power and weaponry.

== See also ==
- List of United States Navy amphibious warfare ships
