= Wasp-class amphibious assault ship =

Class of American amphibious assault ships

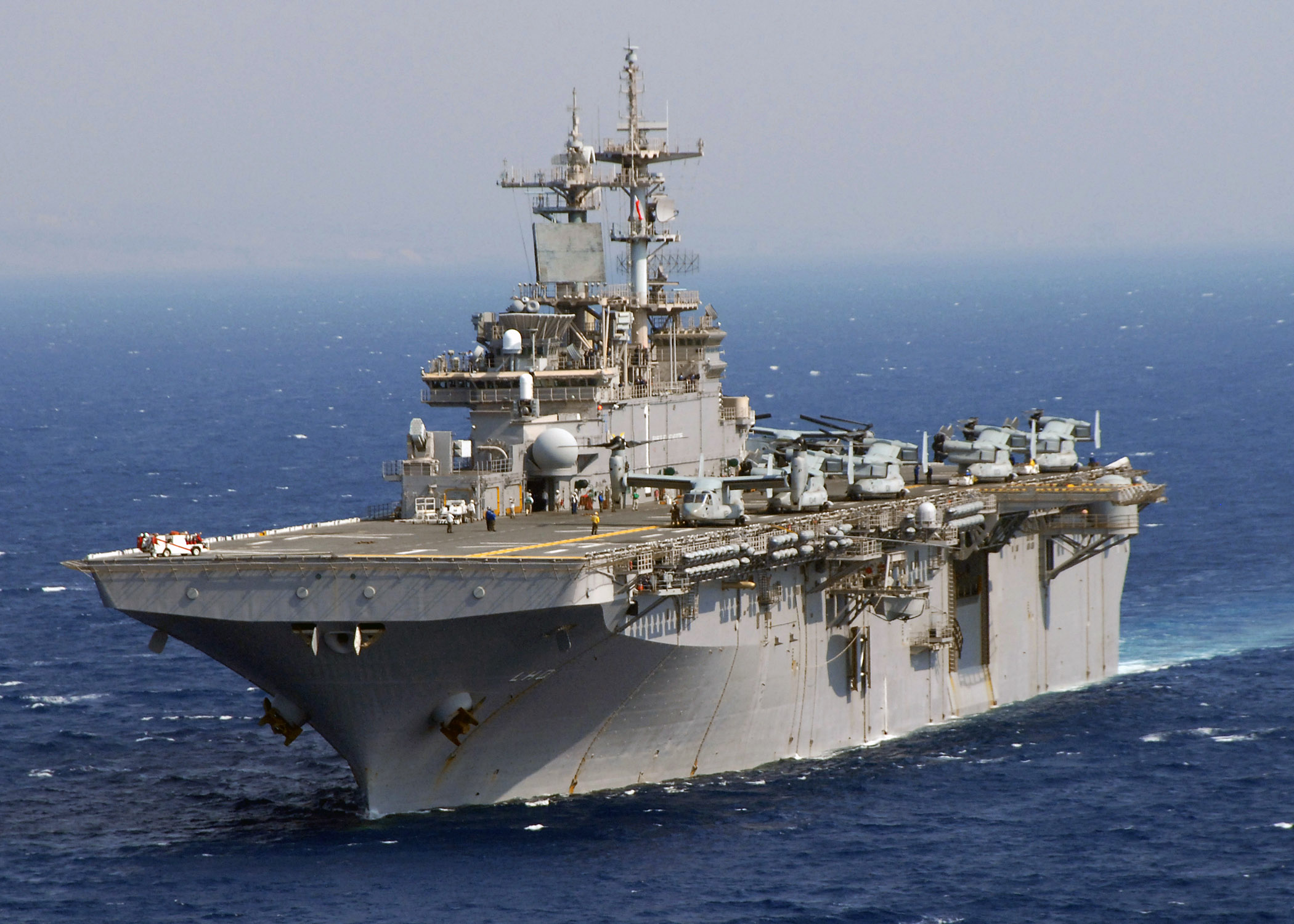
- USS Wasp on 4 October 2007

Class overview
- Name: Wasp class
- Builders: Ingalls Shipbuilding
- Operators: United States Navy
- Preceded by: Tarawa class
- Succeeded by: America class
- Cost: Roughly 2.34 billion in 2025 dollars
- In commission: 1989–present
- Completed: 8
- Active: 7
- Retired: 1

General characteristics
- Type: Amphibious assault ship with aircraft carrying capability
- Displacement: 40,500 long tons (41,150 t) full load
- Length: 843 ft (257 m)
- Beam: 104 ft (31.8 m)
- Draft: 27 ft (8.1 m)
- Installed power: Two boilers; 70,000 shp (52,000 kW)
- Propulsion: Two geared steam turbines, two shafts; Two General Electric LM2500 geared gas turbines, two shafts (USS Makin Island)
- Speed: 22 knots (41 km/h; 25 mph)
- Range: 9,500 nautical miles (17,600 km; 10,900 mi) at 18 kn (33 km/h; 21 mph)
- Well deck dimensions: 266-by-50-foot (81 by 15.2 m) by 28-foot (8.5 m) high
- Boats & landing craft carried: 3 Landing Craft Air Cushion or; 2 Landing Craft Utility or; 12 Landing Craft Mechanized
- Troops: 1,687 troops (plus 184 surge) Marine Detachment
- Complement: 66 officers, 1,004 enlisted
- Sensors & processing systems: 1 AN/SPS-49 2-D Air Search Radar; 1 AN/SPS-48 3-D Air Search Radar; 1 AN/SPS-67 Surface Search Radar; 1 Mk23 Target Acquisition System (TAS); 1 AN/SPN-43 Marshalling Air Traffic Control Radar; 1 AN/SPN-35 Air Traffic Control Radar; 1 AN/URN-25 TACAN system; 1 AN/UPX-24 Identification Friend Foe
- Armament: 2 × RIM-116 Rolling Airframe Missile launchers; 2 × RIM-7 Sea Sparrow missile launchers; 3 × 20 mm Phalanx CIWS systems (LHD 5–8 with two); 4 × 25 mm Mk 38 Machine Gun Systems (LHD 5–8 with three); 4 × .50 BMG machine guns
- Aircraft carried: Actual mix depends on the mission; Standard Complement: 6 AV-8B Harrier II attack aircraft; or; 6 F-35B Lightning II stealth strike-fighters; 4 AH-1W/Z Super Cobra/Viper attack helicopter; 12 MV-22B Osprey assault support tiltrotor; 4 CH-53E Super Stallion heavy-lift helicopters; 3–4 UH-1Y Venom utility helicopters; Assault: 22+ MV-22B Osprey assault support tiltrotor; Sea Control: 20 AV-8B Harrier II attack aircraft; or; 20 F-35B Lightning II stealth strike-fighters; 6 SH-60F/HH-60H ASW helicopters
- Aviation facilities: Hangar deck

The Wasp class is a class of landing helicopter dock (LHD) amphibious assault ships operated by the United States Navy. Based on the Tarawa class, with modifications to operate more advanced aircraft and landing craft, the Wasp class is capable of transporting almost the full strength of a United States Marine Corps Marine Expeditionary Unit (MEU), and landing them in hostile territory via landing craft or helicopters as well as providing air support via AV-8B Harrier II attack aircraft or F-35B Lightning II stealth strike-fighters. All Wasp-class ships were built by Ingalls Shipbuilding, at Pascagoula, Mississippi, with the lead ship, USS Wasp, commissioned on 29 July 1989. Eight Wasp-class ships were built, and as of April 2021, seven are in active service, as USS Bonhomme Richard was seriously damaged by fire on 12 July 2020, and subsequently decommissioned in April 2021.

== Design ==
The Wasp class is based on the preceding Tarawa-class design. The design was modified to allow for the operation of AV-8B Harrier II aircraft and Landing Craft Air Cushion (LCAC) hovercraft, making the Wasp class the first ships specifically designed to operate these.

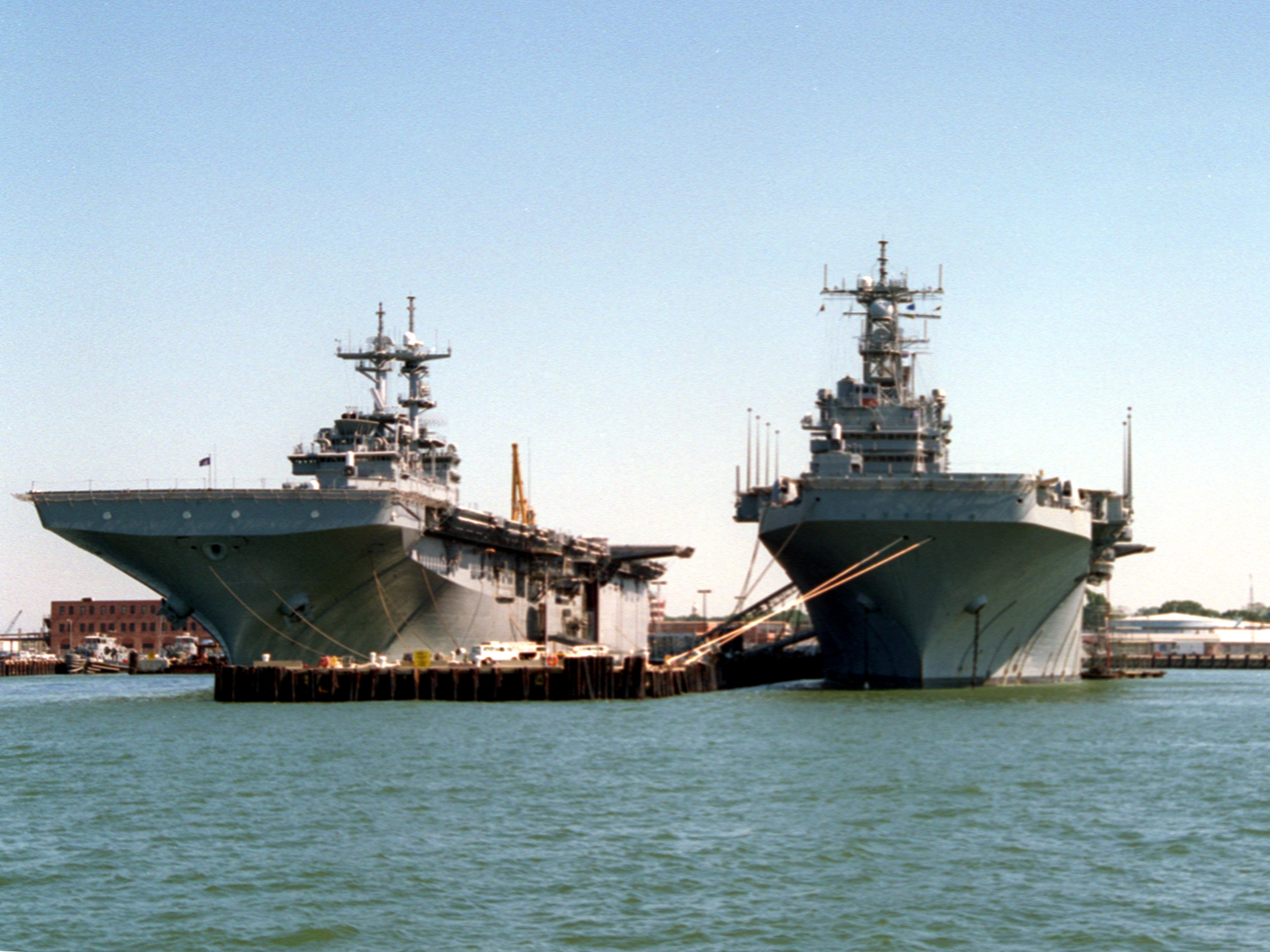
Wasp, left, and Tarawa-class Saipan, in 1993.

The main physical changes between the two designs are the lower placement of the ship's bridge in the Wasp class, the relocation of the command and control facilities to inside the hull, the removal of the 5-inch (127 mm) Mk 45 naval guns and their sponsons on the forward edge of the flight deck, and a lengthening of 24 feet (7.3 m) to carry the LCACs.

Each Wasp-class ship has a displacement of 40,500 long tons (41,150 t) at full load, is 831 feet (253.2 m) long, has a beam of 104 feet (31.8 m), and a draft of 27 feet (8.1 m). For propulsion, most of the ships are fitted with two steam boilers connected to geared turbines, which deliver 70,000 shaft horsepower (52,000 kW) to the two propeller shafts. This allows the LHDs to reach speeds of 22 knots (41 km/h; 25 mph), with a range of 9,500 nautical miles (17,600 km; 10,900 mi) at 18 knots (33 km/h; 21 mph). The last ship of the class, USS Makin Island, was instead fitted with two General Electric LM2500 geared gas turbines. The ship's company consists of 1,208 personnel.

=== Amphibious operations ===
The LHDs can support amphibious landings in two forms: by landing craft and by helicopter. In the 266-by-50-foot (81 by 15.2 m) by 28-foot (8.5 m) high well deck, the LHDs can carry three Landing Craft Air Cushion, twelve Landing Craft Mechanised, or 40 Amphibious Assault Vehicles (AAVs), with another 21 AAVs on the vehicle deck. The flight deck has nine helicopter landing spots and can operate helicopters and tiltrotors as large as the Sikorsky CH-53E Super Stallion and MV-22B Osprey. The size of the air combat element varies depending on the operation: a standard air combat element consists of six Harriers or six F-35B Lightning IIs and four AH-1W/Z Super Cobra/Viper attack helicopters for attack and support, twelve Ospreys and four Super Stallions for transport, and three or four Bell UH-1Y Venom utility helicopters. For a full assault, the air group can have a maximum of 22 Ospreys, while a Wasp operating in the sea control or "Harrier carrier" or "Lightning carrier" configuration carries 20 AV-8Bs or F-35Bs (though some ships of the class have operated as many as 24 Harriers), supported by 6 Sikorsky SH-60 Seahawk helicopters for anti-submarine warfare. Two aircraft elevators move aircraft between the flight deck and the hangar; in order to transit the Panama Canal, these elevators need to be folded in.

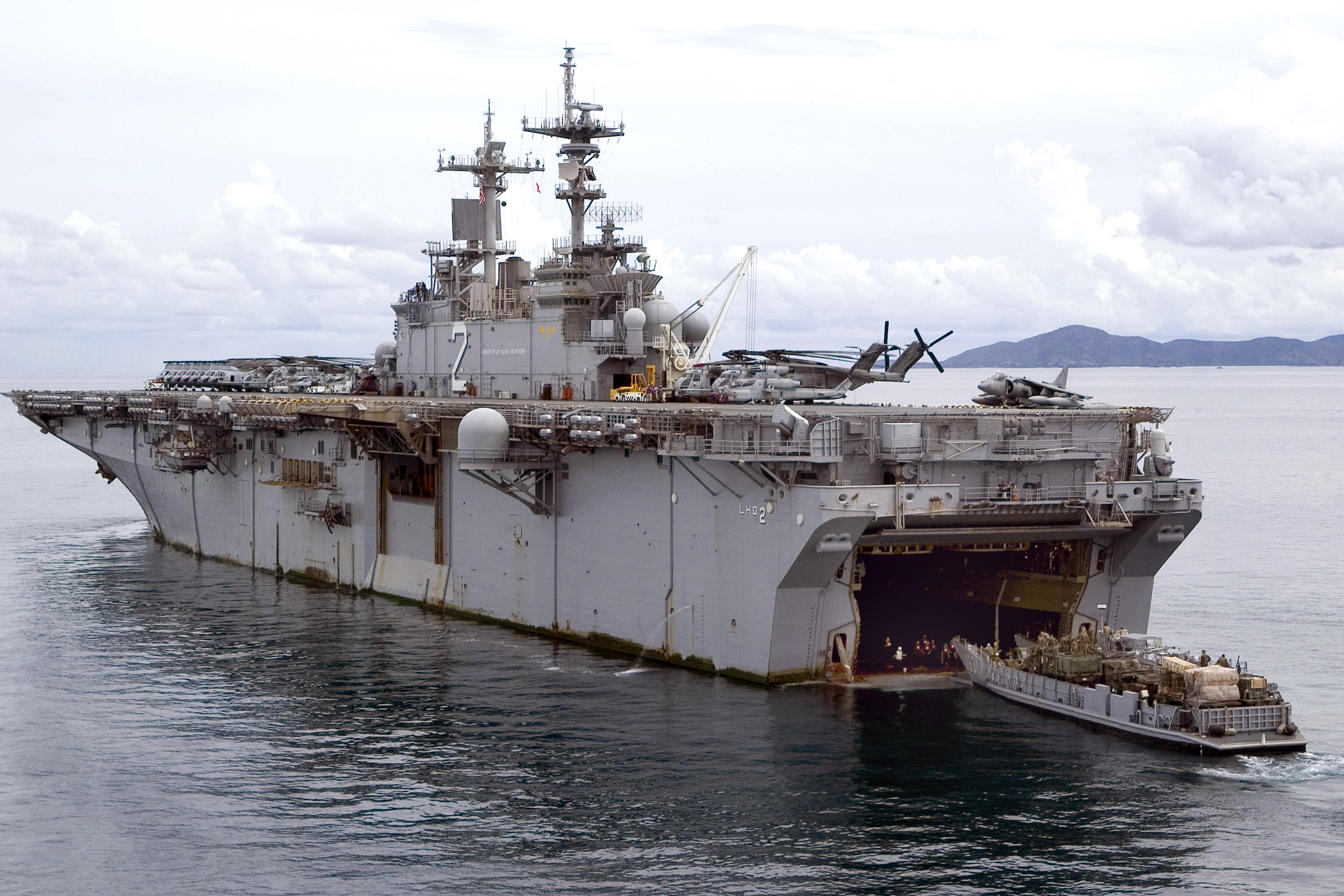
USS Essex performing a stern gate mating with a landing craft

Each ship is capable of hosting 1,894 personnel of the United States Marine Corps; almost the full strength of a marine expeditionary unit (MEU). A Wasp-class vessel can transport up to 30,800 square feet (2,860 m^{2}) of cargo, and another 20,000 square feet (1,858 m^{2}) is allocated for the MEU's vehicles, which typically include 5 M1 Abrams battle tanks, up to 25 AAVs, 8 M198 howitzers, 68 trucks, and up to 12 other support vehicles. A six-track internal monorail system and six 12,000-pound (5,400 kg) internal elevators are used to shift cargo from the cargo holds to landing craft in the well deck.

Each Wasp-class ship has a hospital with 64 patient beds and 6 operating rooms. An additional 536 beds can be set up in an overflow casualty ward as needed.

=== Armament and sensors ===
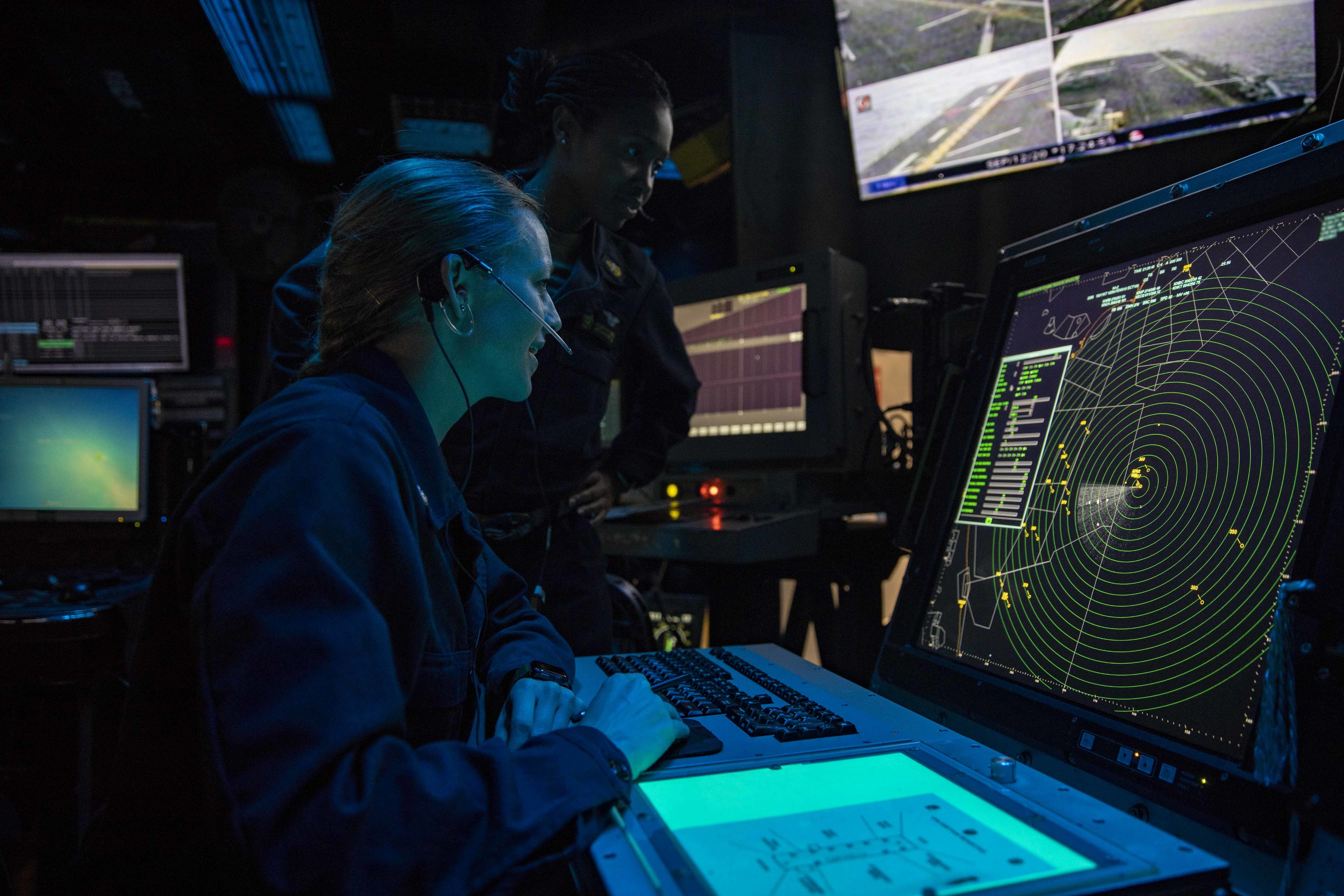
Air traffic control aboard USS Wasp

The armament of the first four Wasp class consists of two Mark 29 octuple launchers for RIM-7 Sea Sparrow missiles, two Mark 49 launchers for RIM-116 Rolling Airframe Missiles, three 20 mm Phalanx CIWSs, four 25 mm Mark 38 chain gun systems, and four .50 caliber machine guns. The next four ships, Bataan, Bonhomme Richard, Iwo Jima, and Makin Island, have a slightly reduced weapons outfit compared to their preceding sister ships, with one Phalanx and one Mark 38 gun removed.

Countermeasures fitted to the ships include four to six Mark 36 SRBOC chaff and decoy launchers, an AN/SLQ-25 torpedo decoy, AN/SLQ-49 chaff buoys, a Sea Gnat missile decoy, and an AN/SLQ-32 Electronic Warfare Suite.

The sensor suite fitted to each ship comprises an AN/SPS-48 or AN/SPS-52 air-search radar backed up by an AN/SPS-49 air-search radar, an SPS-67 surface search radar, an AN/URN-25 TACAN system, along with several additional radars for navigation and fire control.

== Construction ==
All Wasp-class ships were built by Ingalls Shipbuilding, at Pascagoula, Mississippi. The first ship of the class, USS Wasp, was commissioned on 29 July 1989.

The fifth ship of the class, USS Bataan, was constructed through a process of modular assembly and prefitting out, which meant that the LHD was almost 75 percent complete when she was launched. Bataan was also the first LHD that was purpose built to house female crew members (as opposed to being modified after completion), with dedicated berths for up to 450 female sailors or Marines.

Japanese Defense Minister Itsunori Onodera in 2014 suggested that Japan purchase at least one Wasp-class ship to provide robust defensive amphibious capability for Japanese outer islands in the face of Chinese threats.

== Ships in class ==
Name	Hull number	Laid down	Launched	Commissioned	Decommissioned	Homeport	Status
Wasp	LHD-1	30 May 1985	4 August 1987	29 July 1989		Norfolk, Virginia	Active in service
Essex	LHD-2	20 March 1989	23 February 1991	17 October 1992		San Diego, California	Active in service
Kearsarge	LHD-3	6 February 1990	26 March 1992	16 October 1993		Norfolk, Virginia	Active in service
Boxer	LHD-4	18 April 1991	13 August 1993	11 February 1995		San Diego, California	Active in service
Bataan	LHD-5	22 June 1994	15 March 1996	20 September 1997		Norfolk, Virginia	Active in service
Bonhomme Richard	LHD-6	18 April 1995	14 March 1997	15 August 1998	15 April 2021		Scrapped
Iwo Jima	LHD-7	12 December 1997	4 February 2000	30 June 2001		Norfolk, Virginia	Active in service
Makin Island	LHD-8	14 February 2004	22 September 2006	24 October 2009		San Diego, California	Active in service

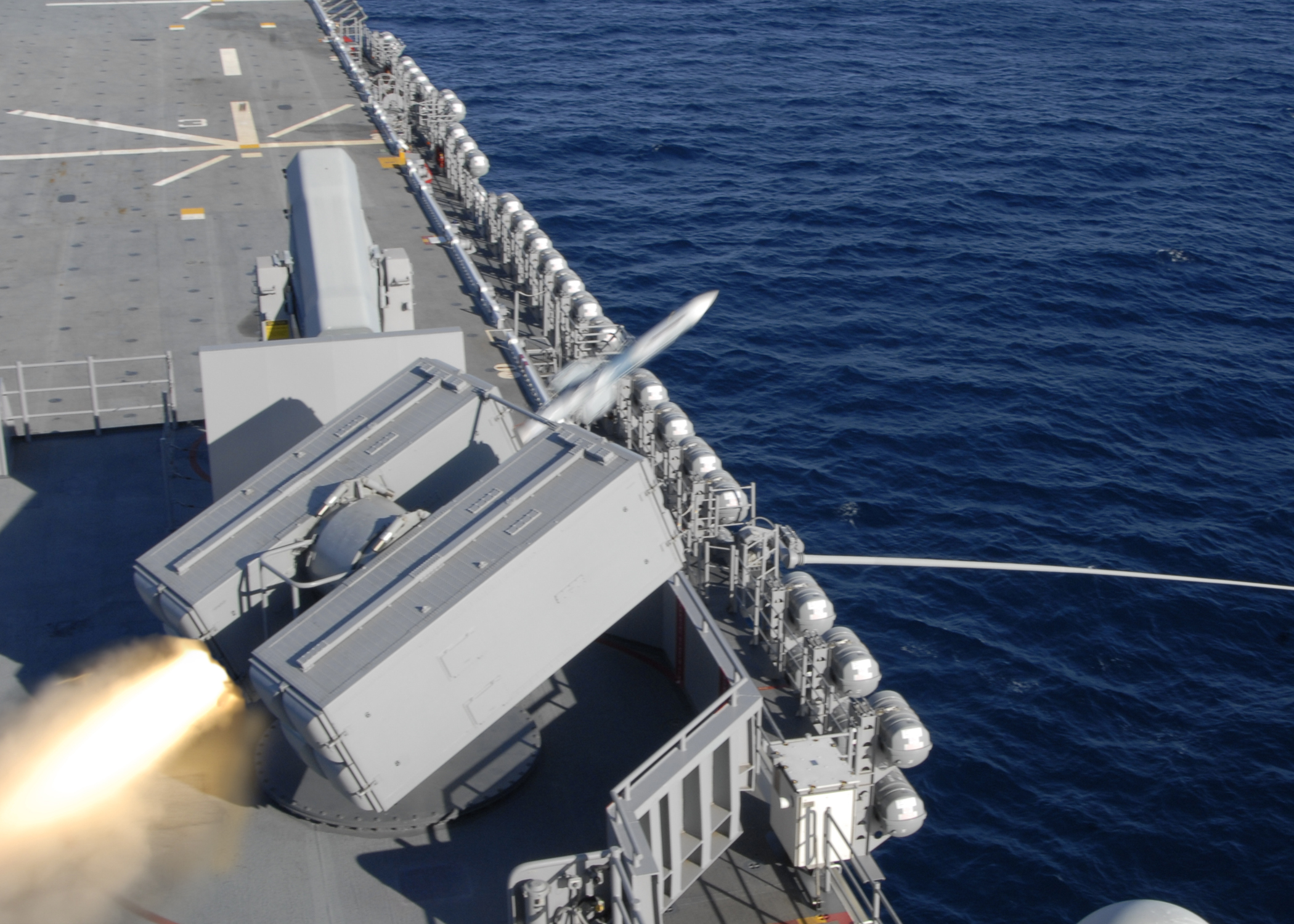
A Sea Sparrow missile being launched by USS Makin Island

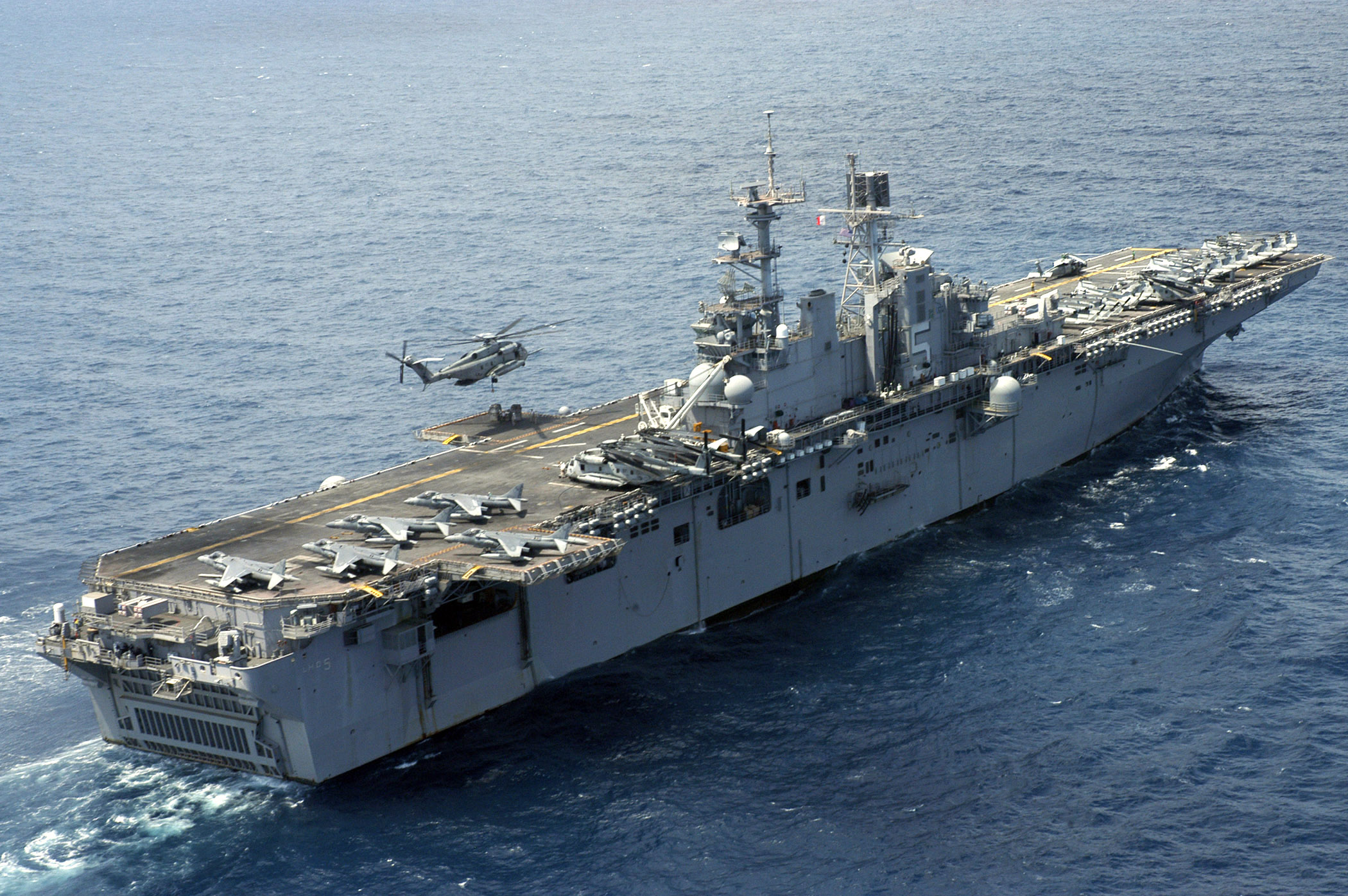
A CH-53E Super Stallion lifting pallets off USS Bataan

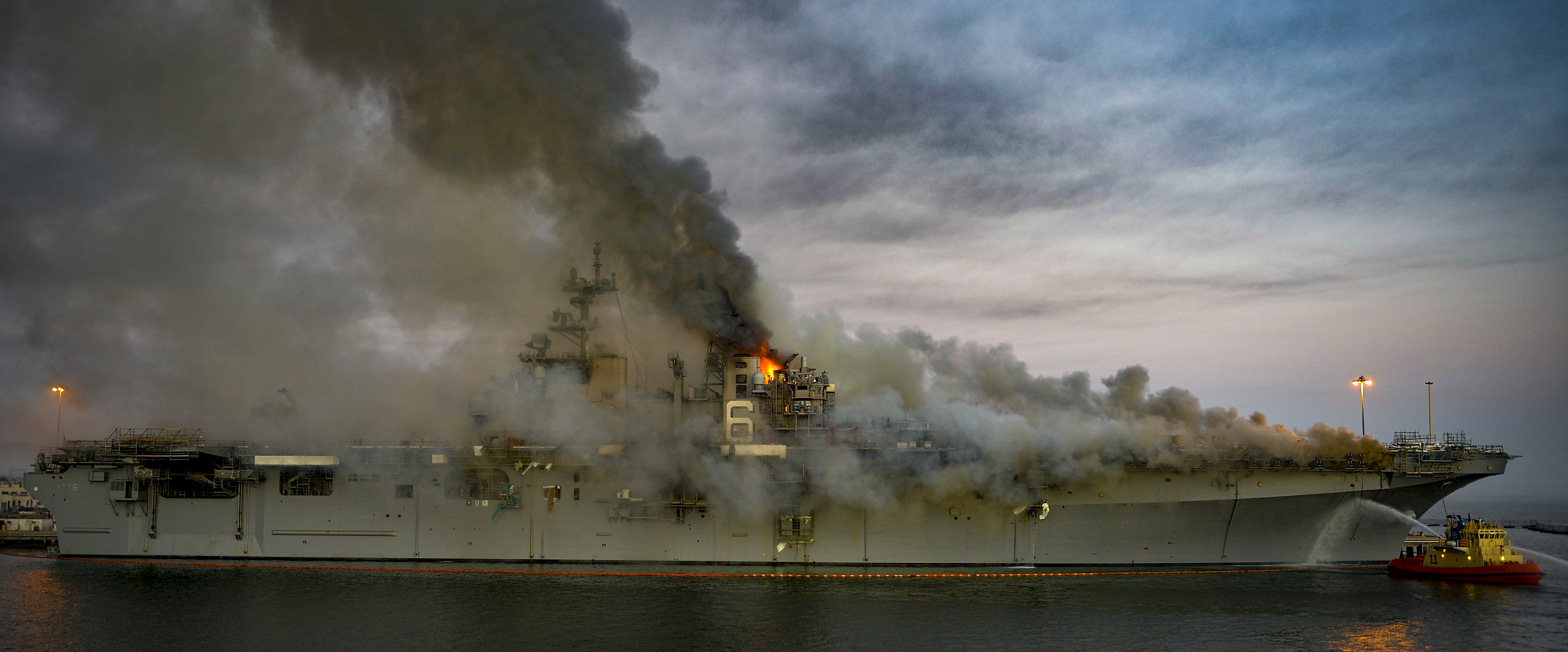
USS Bonhomme Richard on fire at Naval Base San Diego, California, on 12 July 2020.

== Video games ==
In the video game Arma 2, the MARSOC team callsign Razor operates amidst the 27th MEU from the fictional LHD-9 Khe Sanh.

In the video game Battlefield 4, during the single player portion of the game, the protagonist squad, Tombstone, is stationed on the fictional LHD-2 "Valkyrie", LHD-2s are also used as team spawns in some multiplayer maps.

In BATTLEFIELD 3's Noshahr Canals multiplayer map, one team's base is hosted on a Wasp-class amphibious assault ship.
