= USS Essex (LHD-2) =

Wasp-class amphibious assault ship of the US Navy

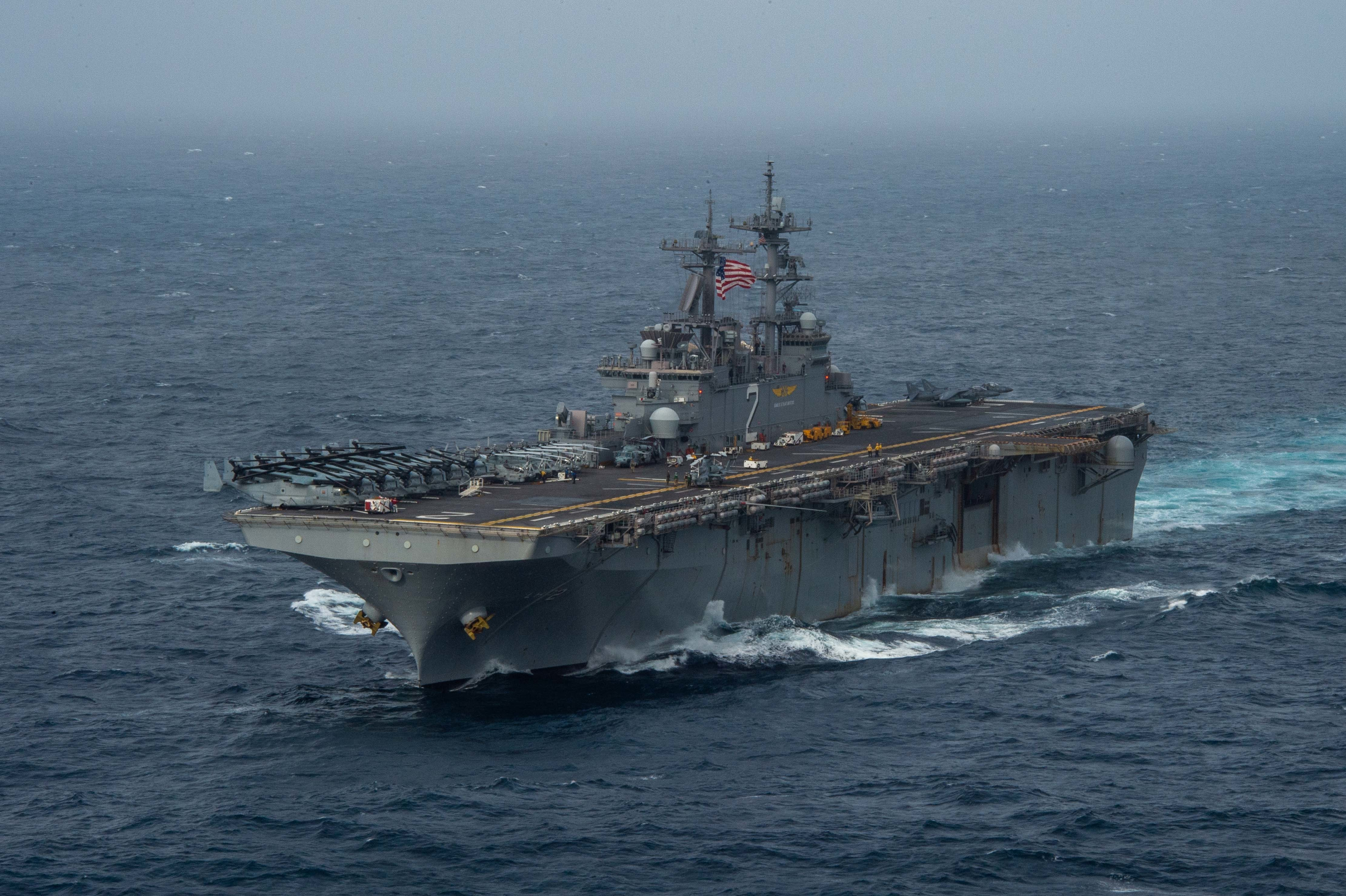
- USS Essex (LHD-2)

History

United States
- Name: Essex
- Namesake: USS Essex (CV-9)
- Ordered: 10 September 1986
- Builder: Ingalls Shipbuilding
- Laid down: 20 March 1989
- Launched: 23 February 1991
- Commissioned: 17 October 1992
- Home port: San Diego
- Identification: MMSI number: 368779000; Callsign: NESX; Hull number: LHD-2
- Motto: Take Notice
- Nickname(s): The Iron Gator
- Status: in active service
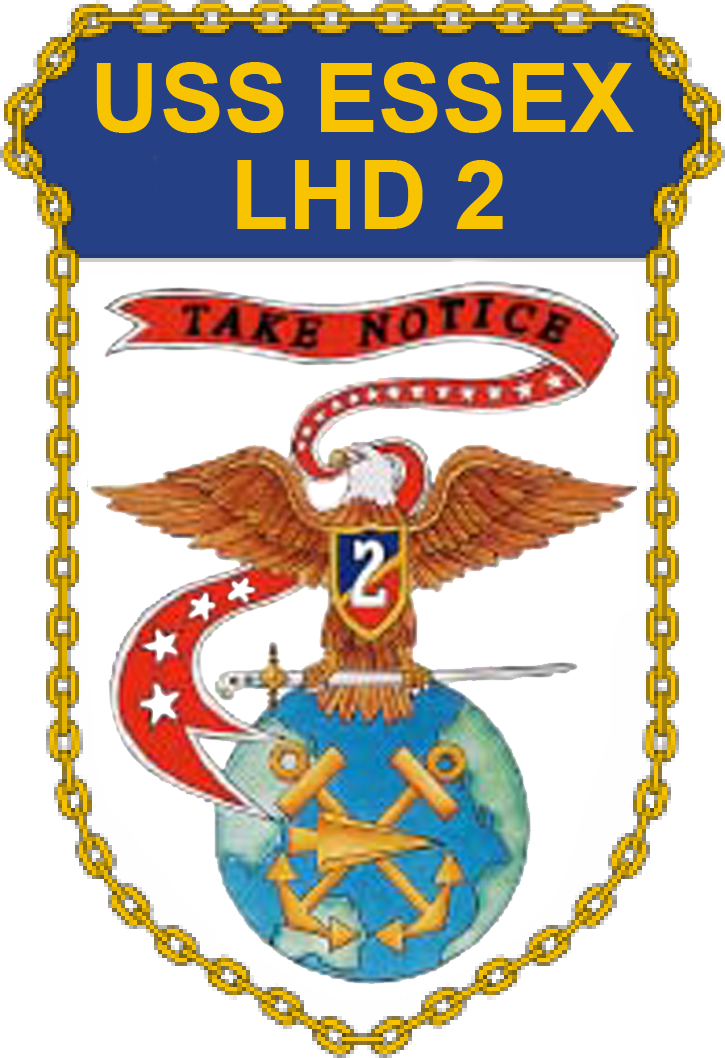
- Badge

General characteristics
- Type: Wasp-class amphibious assault ship
- Displacement: 40,500 long tons (41,150 t) full load
- Length: 844.0 ft (257.25 m)
- Beam: 106 ft (32.3 m)
- Draft: 27 ft (8.1 m)
- Propulsion: Two boilers, two geared steam turbines, two shafts, 70,000 shp (52,000 kW);
- Speed: 22 knots (41 km/h; 25 mph)
- Range: 9,500 nautical miles (17,600 km; 10,900 mi) at 18 kn (33 km/h; 21 mph)
- Well deck dimensions: 266-by-50-foot (81 by 15.2 m) by 28-foot (8.5 m) high
- Boats & landing craft carried: 3 Landing Craft Air Cushion or; 2 Landing Craft Utility or; 12 Landing Craft Mechanized
- Troops: 1,687 troops (plus 184 surge) Marine Detachment
- Complement: 1,208
- Sensors & processing systems: 1 AN/SPS-49 2-D Air Search Radar; 1 AN/SPS-48 3-D Air Search Radar; 1 AN/SPS-67 Surface Search Radar; 1 Mk23 Target Acquisition System (TAS); 1 AN/SPN-43 Marshalling Air Traffic Control Radar; 1 AN/SPN-35 Air Traffic Control Radar; 1 AN/URN-25 TACAN system; 1 AN/UPX-24 Identification Friend Foe
- Armament: Two RIM-116 Rolling Airframe Missile launchers; Three 20 mm Phalanx CIWS systems; Four 25 mm Mk 38 chain guns; Four .50 BMG machine guns
- Aircraft carried: Actual mix depends on the mission; Standard Complement: 6 AV-8B Harrier II attack aircraft; or; 6 F-35B Lightning II stealth strike-fighters; 4 AH-1W/Z Super Cobra/Viper attack helicopter; 12 MV-22B Osprey assault support tiltrotor; 4 CH-53E Super Stallion heavy-lift helicopters; 3–4 UH-1Y Venom utility helicopters; Assault: 22+ MV-22B Osprey assault support tiltrotor; Sea Control: 20 AV-8B Harrier II attack aircraft; or; 20 F-35B Lightning II stealth strike-fighters; 6 SH-60F/HH-60H ASW helicopters

USS Essex (LHD-2) is a Wasp-class Landing Helicopter Dock (LHD) in service with the United States Navy. The amphibious assault ship was built at what is now Huntington Ingalls Industries in Pascagoula, Mississippi. She was launched 23 February 1991 and commissioned on 17 October 1992 while moored at Naval Air Station (NAS) North Island. She is the fifth ship named for Essex County, Massachusetts. Essex served as the command ship for Expeditionary Strike Group Seven until replaced by USS Bonhomme Richard on 23 April 2012.

== History ==
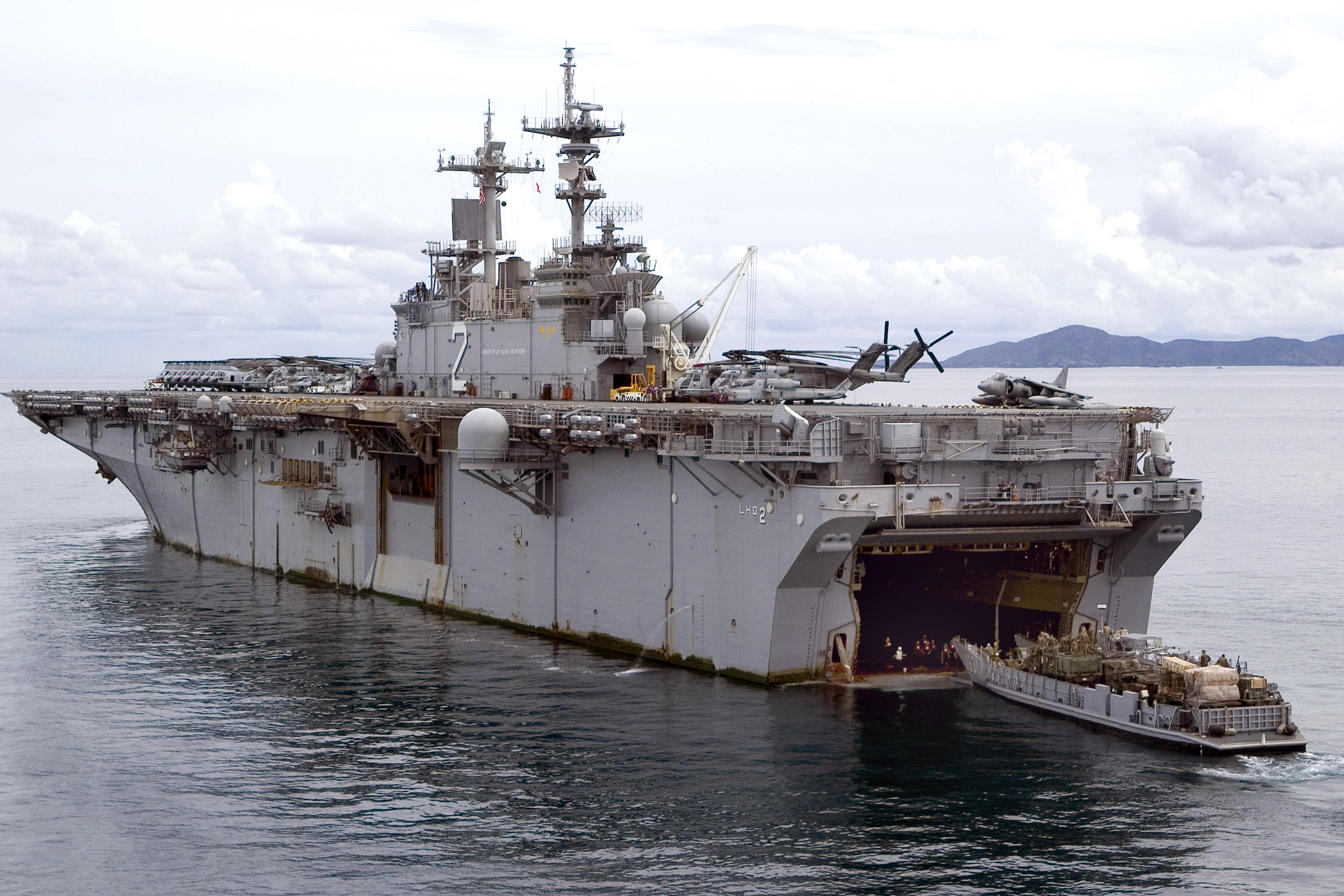
USS Essex performs a stern gate mating with Landing Craft Utility 1631, while back-loading elements of the 31st Marine Expeditionary Unit.

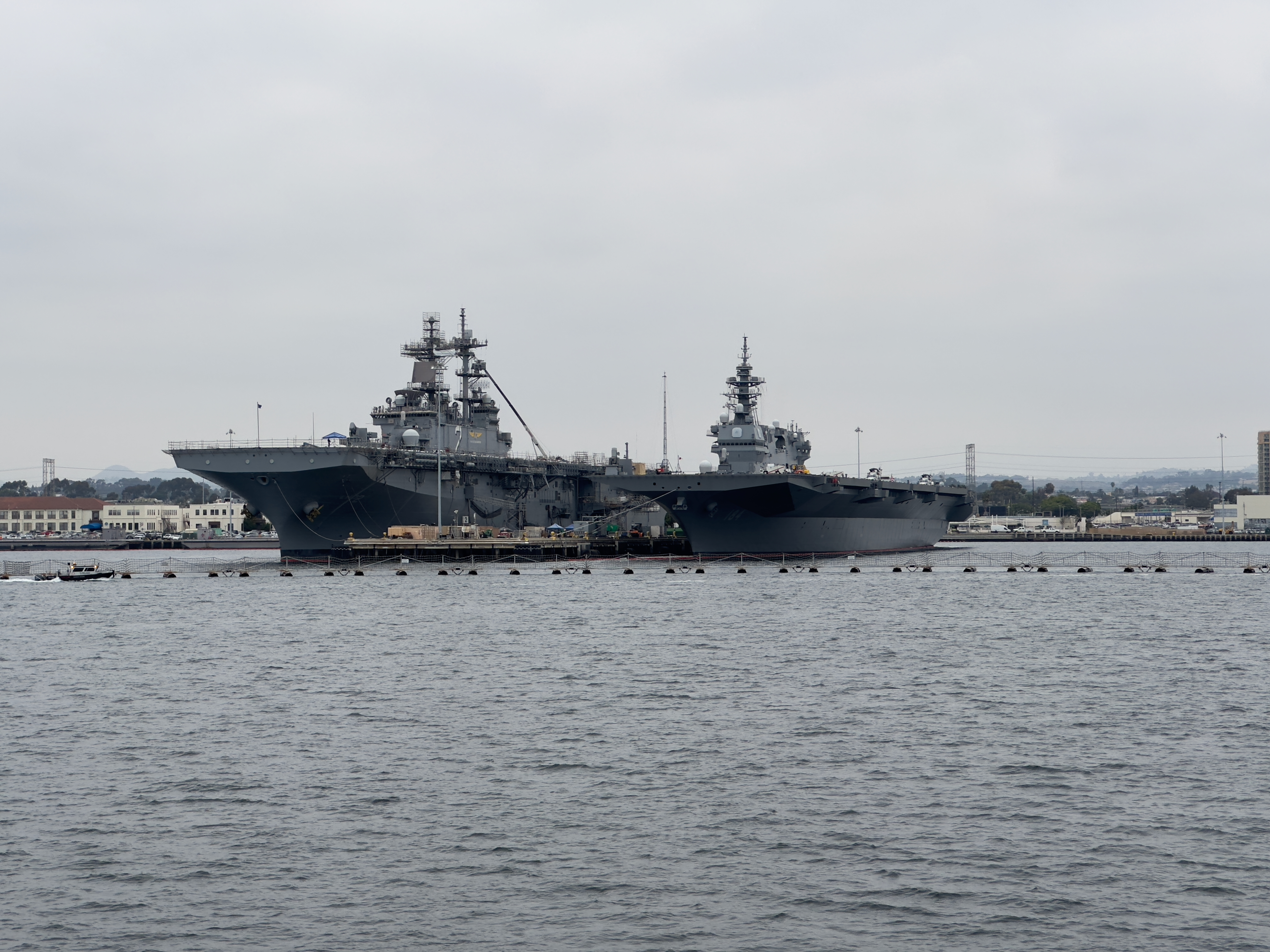
USS Essex and JS Kaga at San Diego Naval Base, October 2024

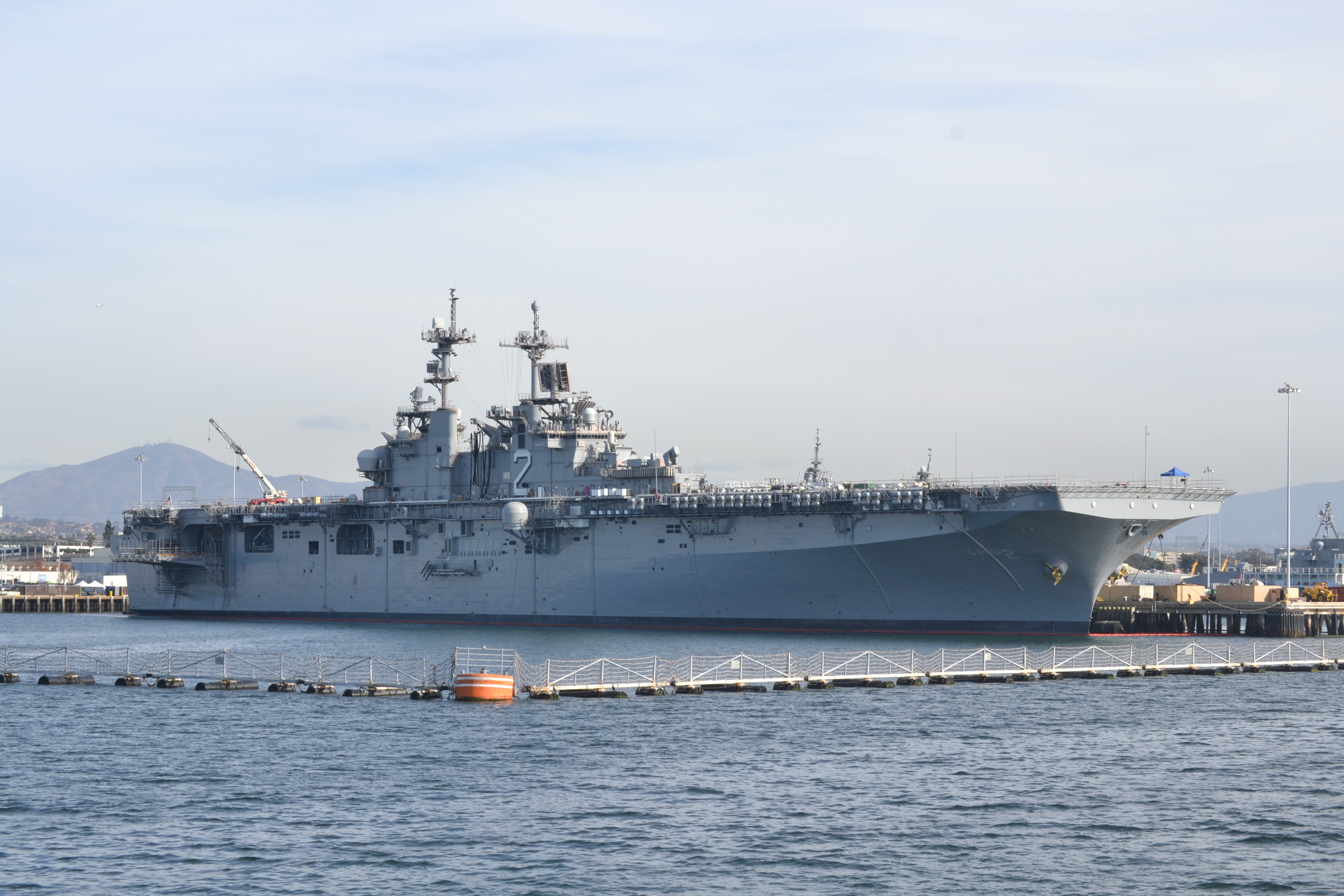
USS Essex in San Diego, 27 November 2024

=== 1990s ===
==== 1993 ====
Essex conducted a training program during the spring of 1993, and from 18 August until 23 November, was undergoing upgrades, during Post Shakedown Availability, in Long Beach harbor.

==== 1994 ====
Essex's maiden deployment was in October 1994. With the 13th Marine Expeditionary Unit (MEU) (Special Operations Capable (SOC)) embarked. In January 1995, she left the Persian Gulf to prepare for the complex task of covering the withdrawal of United Nations multinational force from Somalia in Operation United Shield. Under fire from advancing Somalis, every member of the force was successfully extracted. Essex returned to San Diego on 25 April 1995.

==== 1996 ====
After a short maintenance period, Essex embarked on a vigorous workup cycle, culminating in her participation in Rim of the Pacific Exercise (RIMPAC), a biennial, seven-nation naval exercise. On 10 October 1996, she embarked on her second Western Pacific deployment with the 11th MEU (SOC) and Amphibious Squadron Five. During the deployment, Essex participated in multinational exercises with Qatar, Oman, and Kuwait, as well as Exercise Tandem Thrust 1997, an American-Australian combined exercise with over 28,000 troops, 250 aircraft, and 40 ships participating.

==== 1997 ====
On her return in April 1997, Essex went into a short maintenance period, followed by a shortened workup cycle. She then departed for her third Western Pacific, Indian Ocean, and the Persian Gulf deployment on 21 June 1998 with the 15th MEU (SOC) and Amphibious Squadron Five. Essex participated in Exercises Sea Soldier and Red Reef and Military SALT and Non-Combatant Evacuation Operations with the U.S. Embassy in Kuwait. Additionally, Essex supported Operation Southern Watch, enforcing the UN-mandated no-fly zone over southern Iraq.

=== 2000s ===
==== 2000 ====
On 26 July 2000, after the successful completion of the largest crew swap in U.S. Navy history, Essex replaced USS Belleau Wood and inherited the distinctive role as the Navy's only permanently forward-deployed amphibious assault ship in United States Fleet Activities Sasebo, Japan.

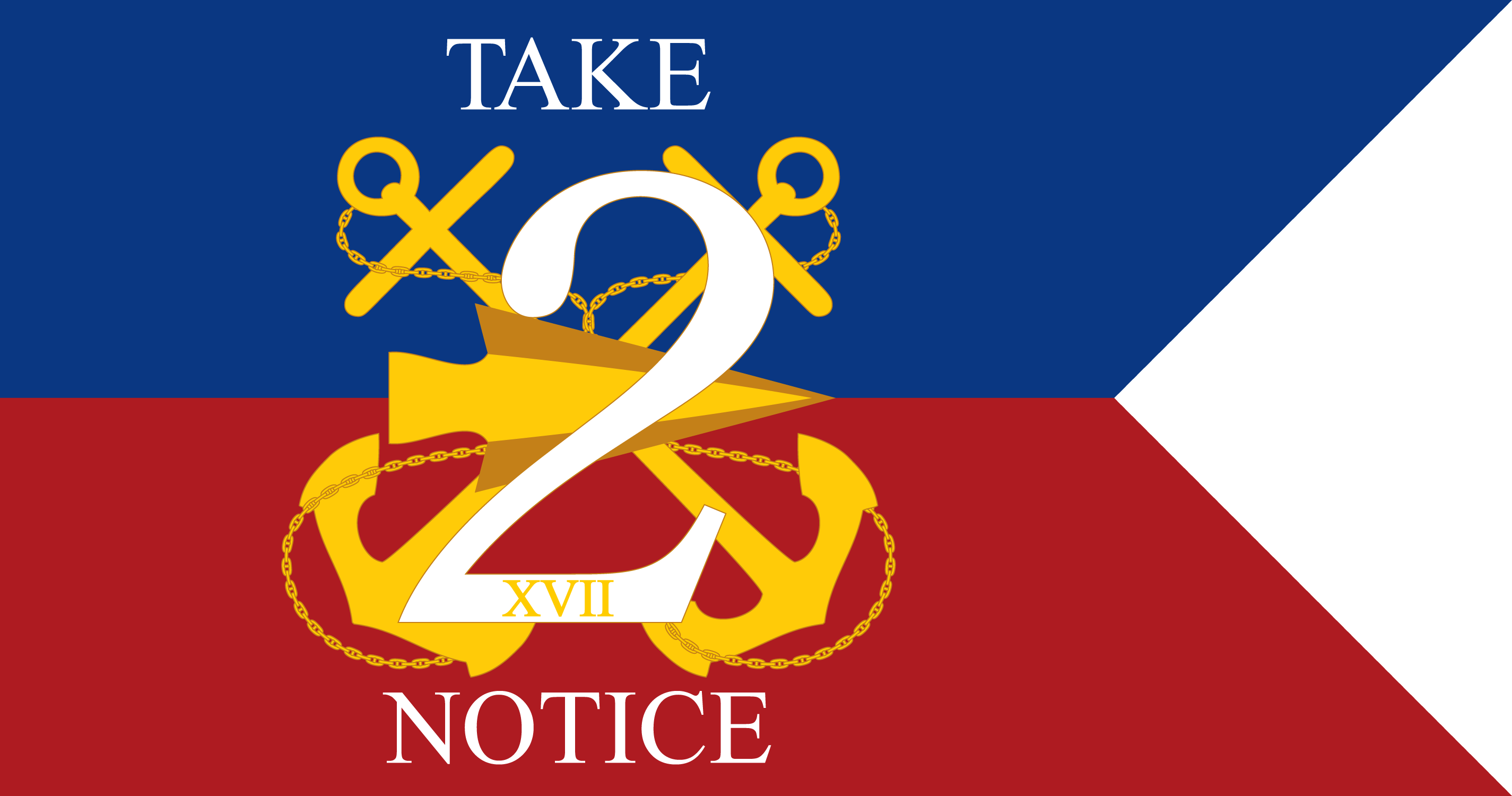
Pennant of Essex.

==== 2003 ====
While in her forward-deployed role, Essex has participated in various humanitarian assistance/disaster relief operations, including East Timor in October and November 2003 and Foal Eagle in Korea in 2003.

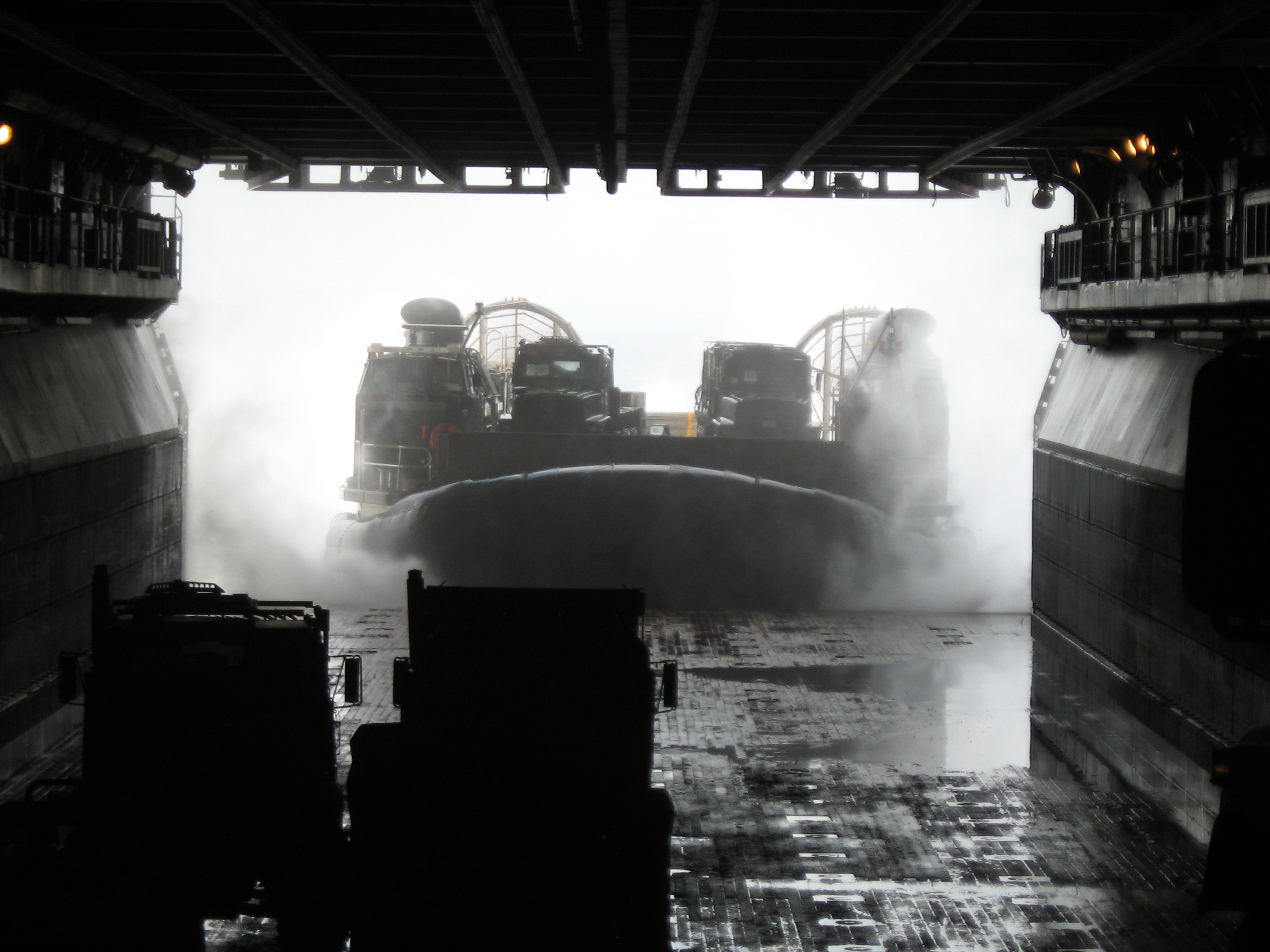
LCAC entering the stern of Essex.

==== 2004 ====
In 2004, Essex carried the 31st MEU to Kuwait, along with USS Harpers Ferry and USS Juneau. Essex stayed in the Persian Gulf while the 31st MEU and the combat element 1st Battalion, 3rd Marines went into Iraq for the Battle of Fallujah. During that time, Essex went to aid in Operation Unified Assistance in Banda Aceh, Indonesia, after the December 2004 tsunami. She then returned to the Persian Gulf to embark the 31st MEU SOC and the combat element despite being in need of maintenance. After picking up the MEU and the Combat Element, the three ships returned to Okinawa, Japan. The ship had been at sea for a total of eight months.

Following the attack on USS Cole in 2000, naval force-protection doctrine emphasized heightened vigilance toward unidentified small craft operating near U.S. vessels. In November 2004, the Essex reportedly fired warning shots at an unidentified small boat that maneuvered aggressively near the vessel during routine operations. The situation resulted in a force-protection response that deterred the approaching craft. No injuries or damage were reported as a result of the incident. Standard documentation procedures were reportedly followed afterward, consistent with Navy requirements for force-protection events. The incident has been referenced informally in discussions regarding small-craft threat response and early-2000s rules of engagement.

==== 2008 ====
During the 2008 Myanmar Cyclone Nargis crisis and the subsequent Operation Caring Response aid mission, Essex and her amphibious group (made up of Juneau, Harpers Ferry, and the destroyer USS Mustin) stood by off Burma from 13 May to 5 June, waiting for the Myanmar junta government to permit US aid to its citizens. In early June, with permission still not forthcoming, it was decided to put the group back on its scheduled operations.

==== 2009 ====
Early in 2009, Essex completed exercise Cobra Gold, which had been cut short the previous year. Essex followed this with exercise Balikatan with the Republic of the Philippines. Essex then got underway in support of exercise Talisman Saber 2009 and conducted various well deck and flight deck evolutions supporting this joint bilateral exercise between the U.S. and Australian military forces.

=== 2010s ===
==== 2010 ====
In February, at the conclusion of exercise Cobra Gold 2010, Essex visited Laem Chabang in Thailand.

From 21–23 October, the Essex Expeditionary Strike Group provided humanitarian assistance and disaster relief to the Philippines after the Super Typhoon Juan (international name Megi) caused extensive destruction to municipalities along the eastern coast of the Province of Isabela. The crew was awarded the Humanitarian Service Medal.

==== 2011 ====
At the request for assistance from the Japanese government, the Navy directed Essex to be deployed off the northeastern coast of Honshu after the massive 2011 Tōhoku earthquake and tsunami. The ship was involved in relief activities in the Sea of Japan off Akita Prefecture. Helicopters from the ship helped deliver relief supplies to quake and tsunami survivors along the northeast coast of Tohoku.

The ship departed Sasebo in September 2011 to patrol the western Pacific. Accompanying the ship were the landing ships USS Germantown and USS Denver.

In November, a Petty Officer 1st Class was fatally injured aboard Essex during a weapons systems test while the ship was off the coast of Bali. A command report released in early 2012 cited "breakdown of safety procedures, protocol violations and gross negligence".

==== 2012 ====
While Essex was scheduled to depart for Cobra Gold 2012, an annual exercise with Thailand, her participation was canceled due to maintenance issues.

It was announced in January 2012 that Essex would be returning to her former home port of San Diego, California, after 11 years of forward deployment in Japan. Before departing for San Diego, the Essex crew will perform a hull swap with the crew of fellow Wasp-class sister-ship, Bonhomme Richard, to continue their deployment to Sasebo, but aboard the newly arrived ship.

===== Collision with USNS Yukon =====
On 16 May 2012, Essex suffered an apparent steering failure while approaching USNS Yukon for an underway replenishment. The two ships collided, causing damage to both ships. There were no injuries, and no loss of fuel was reported. Both ships were able to continue to San Diego under their own power. On 19 June 2012 the Navy announced that the ship's commander, Captain Chuck Litchfield, had been relieved of command due to "loss of confidence in his ability to command."

An investigation determined that the collision was avoidable and caused by improper supervision by Litchfield over his junior bridge crew. Although Essex's steering had failed, the investigation determined that better leadership by Litchfield could have prevented the collision. The investigation recommended administrative action against Essex's executive officer, Officer Of the Deck (OOD), conning officer, and helm safety officer.

Essex entered Naval Base San Diego for an 18-month maintenance and upgrade on 18 September 2012.

==== 2014 ====
After two years of dry-dock and pier side maintenance, Essex executed an on-time underway to conduct sea trials in April 2014. Essex also received an aviation certification in May 2014 by showing proficiency in the launching, landing, and refueling of various helicopters and MV-22 Ospreys on the flight deck. Essex was one of the three US Navy ships, the other two being Harry S. Truman and Kearsarge, in which the US Navy installed metal 3D printers.

==== 2015 ====
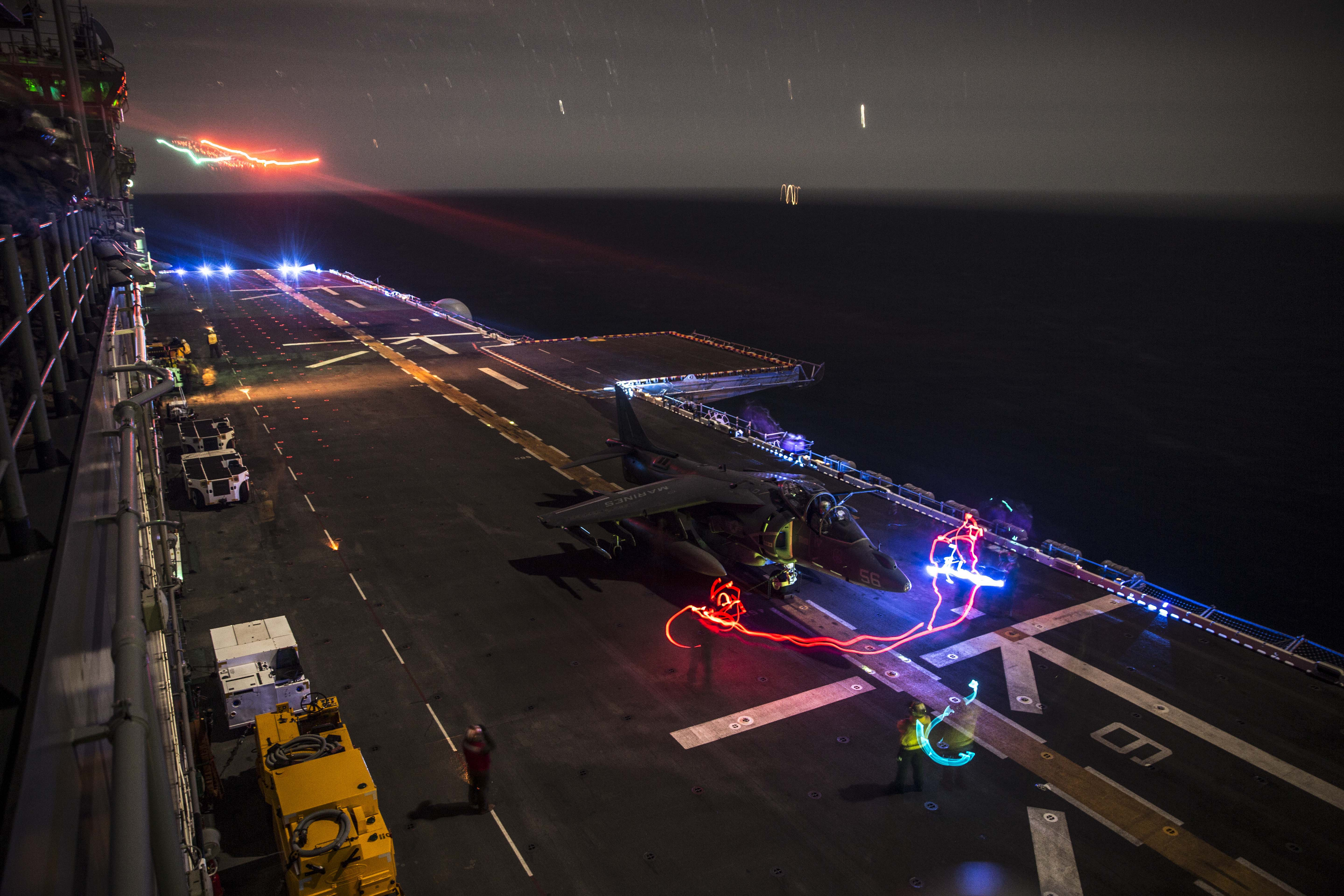
An AV-8B Harrier prepares to take off aboard Essex, off the coast of San Diego, 24 February 2015.

On 30 November 2015, Essex and her Amphibious Ready Group (ARG), embarked with the 15th MEU and entered the United States Third Fleet Area of Operations (AO), returning from a deployment that spread across the 5th, 6th and 7th AOs.

==== 2017 ====
On 7–9 October Essex was in San Francisco, and along with USS Champion, was open to visitors as part of the "San Francisco Fleet Week" event.

==== 2018 ====
In September 2018 the Essex ARG with the F-35B equipped Marine Fighter Attack Squadron 211 (VMFA-211) aboard deployed to the United States Central Command AO and the 13th MEU On 27 September, it was reported that the first-ever F-35B airstrike was launched from Essex against a fixed Taliban target.

=== 2020 COVID-19 pandemic ===
The coronavirus pandemic was reported to have spread to the crew of Essex when its first case was reported on 17 March. The sailor had been attending a course at Naval Base San Diego since 6 February 2020 when the test returned positive on 14 March. The student subsequently self-isolated at home.

=== 2022 ===
On 27-30 May, Essex and USS Portland (LPD-27) were open to the public as a part of Los Angeles Fleet Week 2022, in San Pedro, California.

Essex participated in RIMPAC 2022.

=== 2023 ===
On 2 August, Wei Jinchao a machinist’s mate, was arrested for espionage for passing information about the Essex, the ship he was stationed on, and others, to a Chinese intelligence officer.

== See also ==
- Maritime security
