= AN/SPS-67 =

US Navy 2D surface search and navigation radar

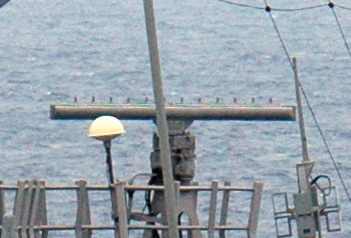
- AN/SPS-67 antenna on USS Paul Hamilton (DDG-60)
- Country of origin: United States
- Type: Surface-search/Navigation
- Frequency: 5.45–5.825 GHz (5.501–5.147 cm); C-band
- RPM: 15/30 rpm
- Range: 56.2 nmi (64.7 mi; 104.1 km)
- Azimuth: 1.5°
- Elevation: 12° AN/SPS-67(V)1; 31° AN/SPS-67(V)2 & (V)3
- Power: 280 kW

The AN/SPS-67 is a short-range, two-dimensional, surface-search/navigation radar providing highly accurate surface and limited low-flyer detection and tracking capabilities.

In accordance with the Joint Electronics Type Designation System (JETDS), the "AN/SPS-67" designation represents the 67th design of an Army-Navy electronic device for surface ship search radar system. The JETDS system also now is used to name all Department of Defense and some NATO electronic systems.

== History ==
The AN/SPS-67 is a solid-state replacement for the AN/SPS-10 radar, using a more reliable antenna and incorporating standard electronic module technology for simpler repair and maintenance. The SPS-67 provides excellent performance in rain and sea clutter, and is useful in harbor navigation, since the radar is capable of detecting buoys and small obstructions without difficulty.

The AN/SPS-67(V)1 version radar is a two-dimensional (azimuth and range) pulsed radar set primarily designed for surface operations with a secondary capability of anti-ship missile and low flyer detection. The radar set operates in the 5.45–5.825 gigahertz (5.501–5.147 cm) range, using a coaxial magnetron as the transmitter output tube. The transmitter/receiver is capable of operation in several pulse width settings: a long (1.0 μs), medium (0.25 μs), or short (0.10 μs) pulse mode to enhance radar performance for specific operational or tactical situations. Pulse repetition frequencies (PRF) of 750, 1200, and 2400 pulses/second are used for the long, medium, and short pulse modes, respectively. The higher PRF settings coupled with the shortest pulse increases the resolution of the return and enables the radar operator/observer to discern or differentiate between a single large target or 2 smaller targets in close proximity to each other.

== Variants ==
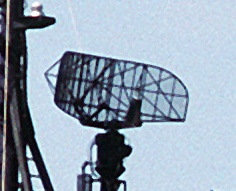
AN/SPS-10 antenna similar to those originally utilized by the SPS-67

- AN/SPS-67(V)1 – Replacement for AN/SPS-10 utilizing -10 antenna.
- AN/SPS-67(V)2 – Improved linear-array antenna and increased bearing accuracy over original.
- AN/SPS-67(V)3 – Used on Flight I Arleigh Burke-class destroyers and includes digital automatic target detection (ATD), track while scan (TWS) and moving target indicator (DMTI).
- AN/SPS-67(V)4 – Uses a slotted waveguide-type antenna
- AN/SPS-67(V)5 – Used on Arleigh Burke-class destroyers Flights II and onwards. Compared to previous variants, it provides more modernized detection and tracking capabilities, can support gun engagements, and has improved performance in littoral environments.

== See also ==
- List of radars
- Electronics Technician
- List of military electronics of the United States
