= Battle of Hollandia =

1944 battle between American and Japanese forces during World War II

Coordinates: 2°31′58.8″S 140°43′1.2″E

- Part of the New Guinea campaign
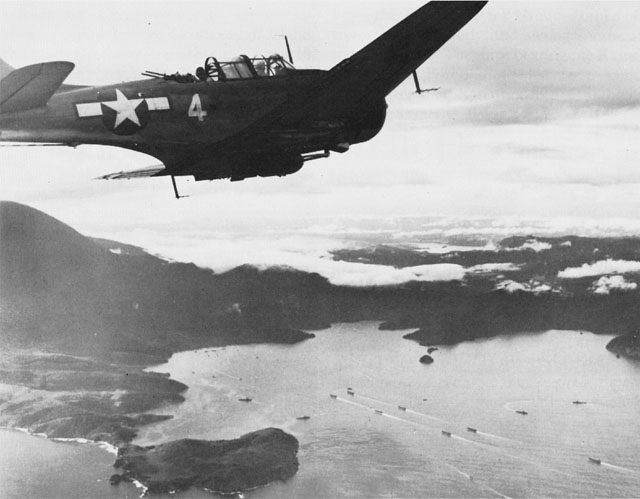
- Landing craft approaching Tanahmerah Bay
Date	22 April – 6 June 1944
Location	Hollandia, Dutch New Guinea
Result	Allied victory

Belligerents
United States; Australia (naval/air)	Japan

Commanders and leaders
(United States) Douglas MacArthur (United States) Robert Eichelberger (United States) Daniel Barbey	(Empire of Japan) Fusatarō Teshima (Empire of Japan) Masazumi Inada

Units involved
(United States) 24th Infantry Division (United States) 41st Infantry Division	(Empire of Japan) 2nd Army

Strength
~ 30,000	11,000

Casualties and losses
152 killed 1,057 wounded	3,300 killed 300 captured

The Battle of Hollandia (code-named Operation Reckless) was an engagement between Allies of World War II and Japanese forces during World War II. The majority of the Allied force was provided by the United States, with the bulk of two United States Army infantry divisions being committed on the ground. Air and naval support consisted largely of U.S. assets, although Australia also provided air support during preliminary operations and a naval bombardment force.

The battle took place between 22 April and 6 June 1944 and formed part of the New Guinea campaign. The operation consisted of two landings, one at Tanahmerah Bay and the other at Humboldt Bay, near Hollandia. The landings were undertaken simultaneously with the amphibious invasion of Aitape ("Operation Persecution") to the east. The battle was an unqualified success for the Allied forces, resulting in a withdrawal by the Japanese to a new strategic defense line in the west of New Guinea and the abandonment of all positions in the east of the island.

== Background ==
=== Geography and strategic situation ===
Hollandia was a port on the north coast of New Guinea, part of the Dutch East Indies, and was the only anchorage between Wewak to the east, and Geelvink Bay to the west. It was occupied by the Japanese during their invasion of the Dutch East Indies in 1942, who planned to use it as a base for their expansion towards the Australian mandated territories of Papua and New Guinea. Japanese plans to occupy Port Moresby were negated by losses during the Battle of the Coral Sea and Battle of Milne Bay. Consequently, Japanese efforts to develop the area were delayed throughout 1943 and 1944.

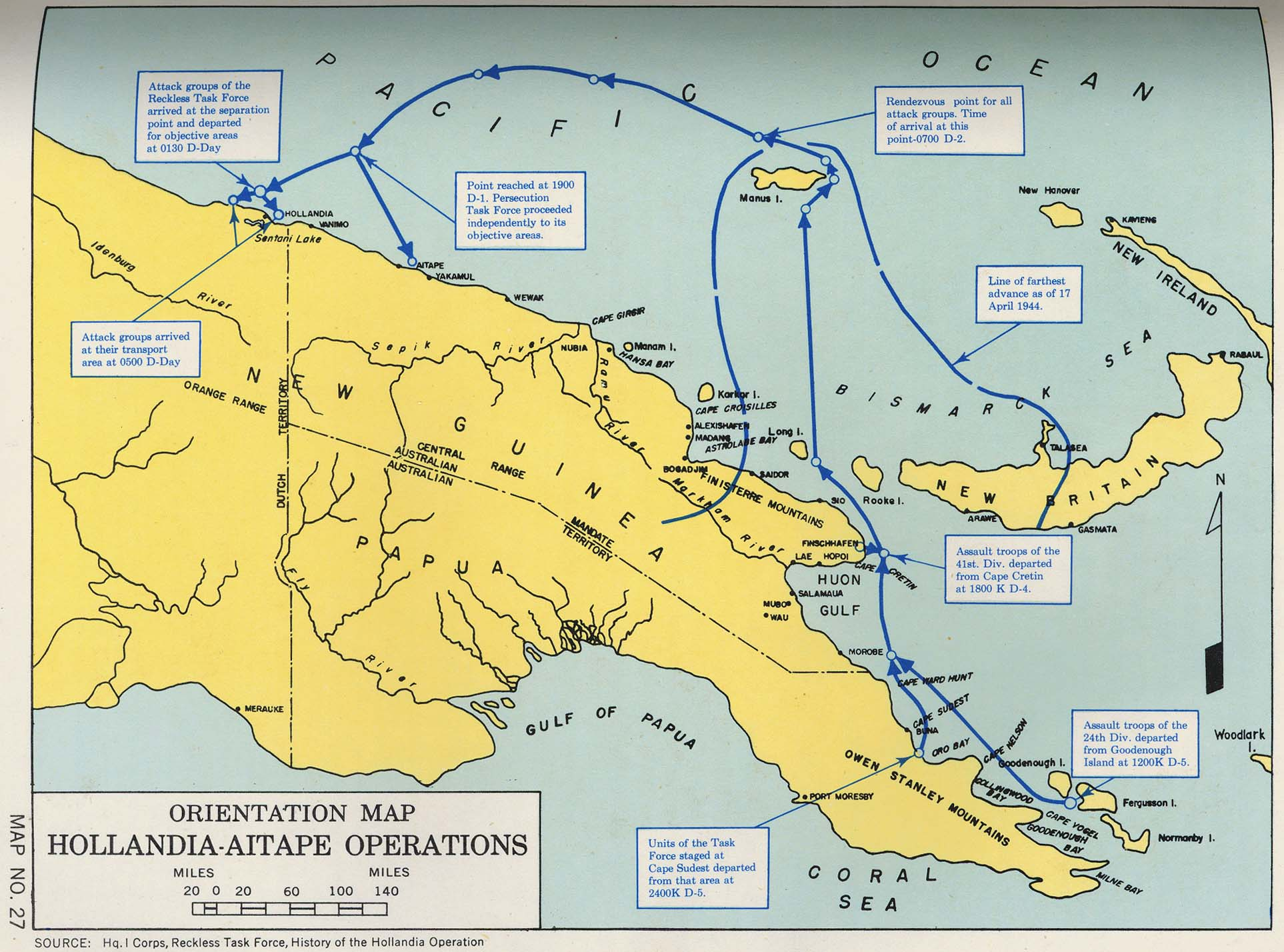
Hollandia–Aitape operations map

Hollandia was situated on the east side of a headland separating Humboldt Bay to the east and Tanahmerah Bay, 25 miles (40 km) to the west. The town itself was on the shore of Humboldt Bay, with a first-class anchorage. The headland was formed by the Cyclops Mountains, a mountain ridge rising steeply to 7,000 feet (2,100 m) and was backed by Lake Sentani, extending 15 miles (24 km) east to west. Between the mountain ridge and the lake was a narrow plain where the Japanese had built a number of airfields; three had been constructed by April 1944 and a fourth was under construction. Of these, only one was considered to be complete.

In early 1944, after the Huon Peninsula had been secured, the Allied South West Pacific Command determined that the area should be seized and developed into a staging post for their advance along the north coast of New Guinea into the Dutch East Indies and to the Philippines.

=== Plans ===
Allied intelligence successes led to the decision to land at Hollandia. Intelligence gained from breaking the codes protecting Imperial Japanese Army radio messages led the Allies to learn that the Hollandia area was only lightly defended, with Japanese forces being concentrated in the Madang-Wewak region. In response, on 8 March General Douglas MacArthur sought approval from the Joint Chiefs of Staff to bring forward the previously planned landings at Hollandia to 15 April. Approval was granted four days later. MacArthur's plan was bold, as it involved making a large amphibious landing deep behind the front lines in New Guinea. The Joint Chiefs of Staff also directed the United States Pacific Fleet to assign aircraft carriers to provide air support for the landings. The attack was designated Operation Reckless in recognition of the risks involved in carrying it out.

MacArthur met with the commander of the Pacific Fleet, Admiral Chester W. Nimitz, at Brisbane between 25 and 27 March to discuss the role of the Navy in the operation. While MacArthur sought eight days worth of support from the fleet's powerful fleet carriers, Nimitz would only agree to commit this force for two days after the landings. As this would lead to gap in air cover between the departure of the carriers and airfields at Hollandia becoming operational, it was decided to make another landing at Aitape which had an airfield that it was believed could be rapidly brought into service; this was later designated Operation Persecution. Nimitz offered to assign eight small escort carriers to support the landing at Aitape, with these vessels then proceeding to support operations at Hollandia until 11 May. The timing of the landings at Hollandia were moved back to 22 April at around this time due to logistical problems and the Pacific Fleet's other commitments, and it was decided to conduct the landing at Aitape simultaneously with the main assault.

The Japanese high command intended to hold Hollandia. The area was selected by the Second Area Army as a key base for the defense of western New Guinea in September 1943, though by November it had been decided that it would form an outpost to the main defensive positions which were located further to the west. Few combat units were stationed at Hollandia in early 1944. In March General Hatazo Adachi, the commander of the Japanese 18th Army, was ordered by the Second Area Army to withdraw his forces west from the Madang-Hansa Bay area to Hollandia, with one division to be dispatched there immediately. Adachi ignored this order, and instead decided to concentrate his troops at Hansa Bay and Wewak. Adachi's decision may have been motivated by a belief that Hansa Bay would be the target of the next Allied amphibious landing and that he could reinforce Hollandia at a later date. After the chief of staff of the Second Area Army travelled to Wewak to deliver Adachi orders in person, he directed that the 66th Infantry Regiment begin moving from Wewak to Hollandia on 18 April; it was expected that this unit would arrive there in mid-June. Adachi continued to plan to make a last stand at Hollandia if he was defeated at Hansa Bay.

As an attack on Hollandia was not expected, no plans were prepared to defend the area prior to the Allied landing. Because aircraft carriers had not been previously used to support Allied amphibious landings in the South-West Pacific, in early 1944 the Japanese leadership judged that Hollandia was safe from a direct attack as it was beyond the range of the available Allied fighter aircraft. The 18th Army did not plan for the defense of Hollandia, and the Army Air Force and Naval units stationed there had little opportunity to develop plans due to the rapid turnover of their leadership.

=== Opposing forces ===
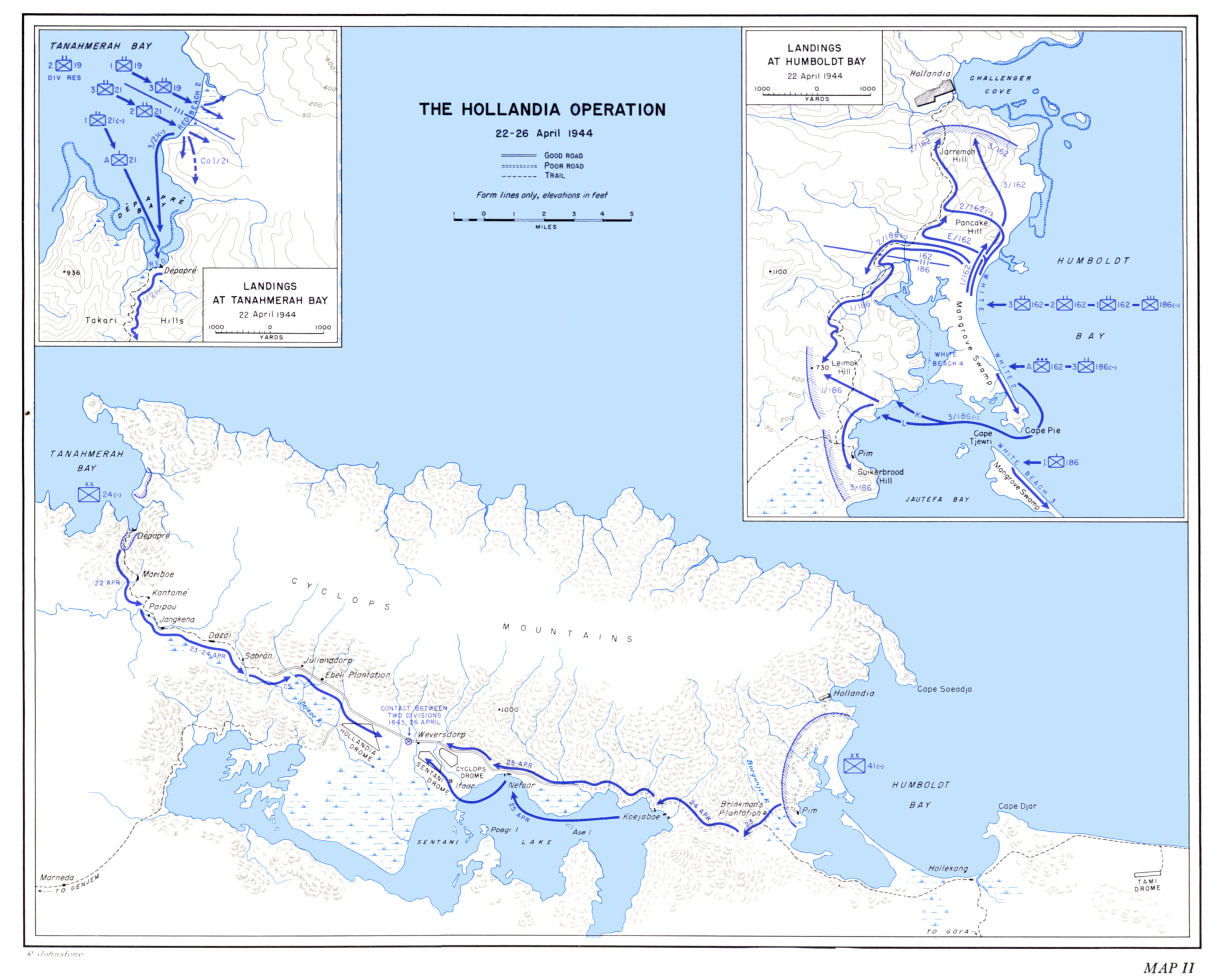
Map of Operation Reckless

The port and airfields were the base for units of the Japanese 2nd Army (General Fusatarō Teshima) and the 6th Air Division of the 4th Air Army. These totaled 11,000 men under the command of General Masazumi Inada, Major General Toyozo Kitazono and Rear Admiral Yoshikazu Endo (Ninth Fleet). Only about 500 of the 11,000 personnel were ground combat troops, being drawn from several antiaircraft batteries. These troops were positioned along the Depapre – Lake Sentani trail. A large number of Japanese aircraft were stationed at airfields near Hollandia in March 1944.

Allied planners estimated Japanese forces around Hollandia at around 14,000 troops in total. It proved difficult to accurately estimate the size and composition of the Japanese defenses, as attempts to infiltrate reconnaissance parties in the area failed. As a result, code breaking was the main source of intelligence. During the early stages of the planning process MacArthur's headquarters believed that two Japanese infantry regiments may have been in the Hollandia area, but this was later discounted. It was later thought that 3000 troops from the 6th Sea Detachment were in the area, and reinforcements were being rapidly transferred there.

I Corps under Lieutenant General Robert Eichelberger provided most of the ground forces for the combined Operations Reckless and Persecution. The attack force comprised 84,000 personnel, including 52,000 combat troops, 23,000 support personnel, and a naval task force of 200 vessels of 7th Fleet’s Task Force 77 under Rear Admiral Daniel Barbey. Of the total force, 22,500 combat troops were assigned to the landing at Aitape; while the rest (nearly 30,000) were allocated to the Hollandia landings.

The main landings at Hollandia would be made at two locations. The U.S. 24th Division's 19th and 21st Regimental Combat Teams (RCTs) were to land at Tanahmerah Bay. The other landing would be made at Humboldt Bay by two RCTs (the 162nd and 186th) of the 41st Division. The operation was the 24th Infantry Division's first combat assignment after home defense duties in Hawaii and training in Australia, but the 41st Infantry Division had previously taken part in the fighting in New Guinea in 1942–1943.

The ground forces would be supported by two naval bombardment forces. Task Force 74, under British Rear Admiral Victor Crutchley, consisted of the cruisers HMAS Australia and Shropshire plus several destroyers, while Task Force 75 was made up of three U.S. cruisers, Phoenix, Nashville and Boise under Rear Admiral Russell Berkey. These were supported by a force of eight escort carriers of the 5th Fleet. Secondary landings would take place Aitape, 125 miles to the east, at the same time as those around Hollandia. The decision to undertake these operations simultaneously stretched Allied shipping and logistics resources, and necessitated reallocating resources from other theaters and roles. The shortage of shipping meant that each ship had to be loaded as efficiently as possible, using a technique known as combat loading to ensure that the most important stores and equipment could be unloaded quickly.

== Landings ==
=== Preparations ===
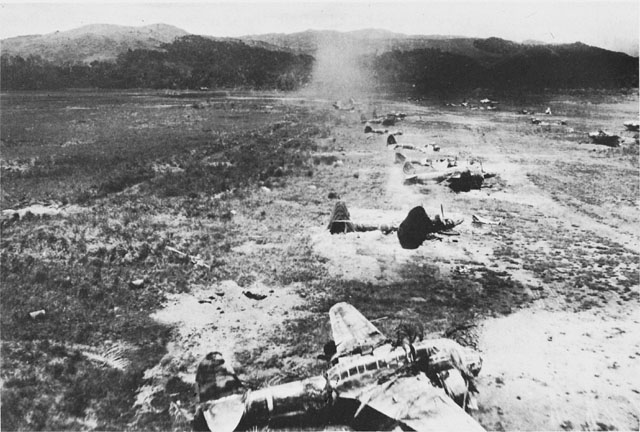
Hollandia airfield after raids by the 5th Air Force

Initial operations commenced in the second week of March 1944 with air raids by aircraft of the U.S. 5th Air Force and the Royal Australian Air Force attacked Japanese airfields along the New Guinea coast from Wewak to the Vogelkop and on Biak Island. In the final days of March, the Fast Carrier Force (Task Force 58) attacked Japanese airbases on Palau and islands in the Carolines. Meanwhile, on 30 March and continuing to 3 April these air forces attacked Hollandia itself and the airfields on the Sentani plain. Achieving complete surprise, they were able to destroy 340 aircraft on the ground and 60 more aircraft in the air, leaving the 6th Air Division unable to resist the planned invasion. This bombing operation was also the moment in the New Guinea campaign when Japanese air power no longer threatened the Allies. During the same period, American air and naval forces sank many of the Japanese ships which were attempting to transport reinforcements to the Hollandia and Wewak areas; these attacks were guided by intelligence gained from breaking the Japanese codes. The air and naval attacks succeeded in isolating the remaining Japanese forces in New Guinea.

The Allies conducted a deception operation to ensure that the Japanese continued to believe that they would land at Hansa Bay rather than Hollandia. This involved air attacks and naval bombardments on the Wewak area, and faked landings of reconnaissance patrols. This deception effort proved successful.

In response to a request from the head of the US Navy, Admiral Ernest King, the Eastern Fleet conducted a raid on Japanese positions on the island of Sabang in the Indian Ocean ahead of the landings at Hollandia and Aitape. This attack, which was designated Operation Cockpit, aimed to prevent the Japanese from transferring air units stationed near Singapore to New Guinea. The Eastern Fleet's British and American aircraft carriers raided Sabang on 19 April. This operation had no effect on the Japanese, as the air units were being held in reserve for a planned major attack on American naval forces in the Central Pacific.

=== Assault ===
The 41st Division was to stage from Cape Cretin, while the 24th would depart from Goodenough Island. After rehearsals and loading, on 16 to 18 April the amphibious forces sailed from their bases at Finschafen and Goodenough Island; they joined up with other ships carrying troops bound for Aitape from Seeadler Harbour and then rendezvoused with the escort aircraft carriers providing air cover off Manus Island early on 20 April. After taking evasive routes to the west of the Admiralty Islands to avoid air attack, the convoy turned back towards their objective late in the afternoon. The convoy split around 80 miles (130 km) offshore, with the Eastern Attack Group, consisting of troops assigned to Operation Persecution turning away for Aitape. They arrived off Hollandia during the night of 21/22 April and about 20 miles (32 km) offshore, the convoy split again with the Central Attack Group preceding for Humboldt Bay while the Western Attack Group turned towards Tanahmerah Bay. The landings took place at dawn on 22 April after a supporting naval bombardment at each site. Meanwhile, carrier-borne aircraft attacked targets around Wakde, Sarmi and Hollandia from 21 April, destroying at least 33 Japanese planes in the air and more on the ground.

At Tanahmerah Bay, after a naval bombardment from the three Australian cruisers commencing around 06:00, the two RCTs from the 24th Division disembarked from the four U.S. and Australian transports – Henry T. Allen, Carter Hall, Kanimbla and Manoora – and moved ashore aboard 16 LCIs. Seven LSTs were also assigned. The plan called for the establishment of a two-battalion front, with troops landed in seven waves at two beaches: Red 1 around the Depapre Inlet and Red 2 on the eastern side of the bay. Allied planners believed that the two beaches were connected by a road, and that another road – suitable for vehicle traffic – ran inland towards Lake Sentani. Pre-landing reconnaissance efforts were hampered by the destruction of the Australian scouting party that was landed in the area by submarine in late March, and the reality of the terrain was only discovered through aerial intelligence that arrived too late.

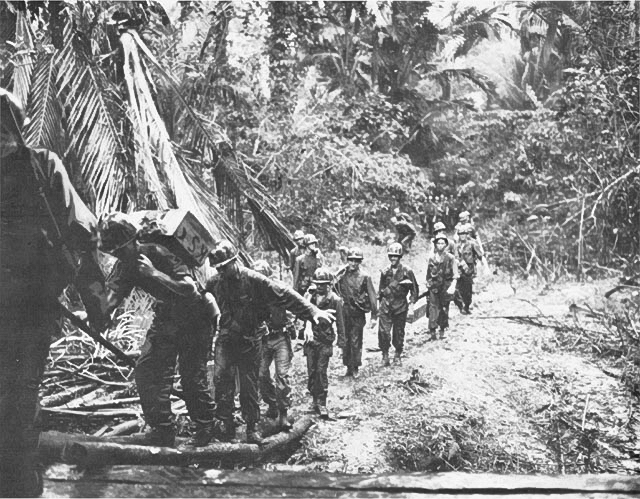
US troops at Tanahmerah Bay

On landing, the U.S. troops came under sporadic small arms and machine gun fire, but this was quickly suppressed. The terrain, however, proved more problematic. Red 2 beach was found to be highly unsuitable and the promised roads were non-existent. Backed by a swamp just 30 yards from the shoreline, and with just one exit trail unsuitable for vehicles, it quickly became congested. Red 1 was found to be better, allowing LVTs and LCMs to come ashore with their infantry charges, but the approaches had to be cleared by engineers to allow the passage of the larger LCMs and even after this had been completed. The beach was narrow, though, and only allowed two LCMs to land at a time, while the even bigger LSTs had to remain offshore where they were cross loaded on to LVTs.

As a result of the terrain difficulties, Tanahmerah Bay was quickly written off as a landing site; while the infantry already ashore pressed on to the Sentani plain the remainder of the 24th Division was diverted to Humboldt Bay, which had by this time been secured. After four days under these conditions the two units had reached the western airfield and on 26 April it was secured.

Meanwhile, at Humboldt Bay Rear Admiral William M. Fechteler's Central Attack Group carrying the U.S. 41st Division also achieved complete surprise, coming ashore at two beaches: White 1, about 2.5 miles (4.0 km) south of Hollandia, and White 2 on a narrow sandspit near Cape Tjeweri at the entrance to Jautefa Bay, and about 4 miles (6.4 km) from Lake Sentani. White 1 would be the main landing, as it provided the only spot where the larger LSTs could land, while White 2 would be secured with smaller LVTs and DUKWs, which would be used to cross the shallow entrance to Jautefa Bay. The three supporting U.S. cruisers and destroyers began their bombardment around 06:00, concentrating on targets around the entrance to Jautefa Bay and Hollandia. This bombardment was augmented with air strikes from carrier-borne aircraft, while two destroyer-minesweepers, Long and Hogan, swept the bay ahead of the main landing force.

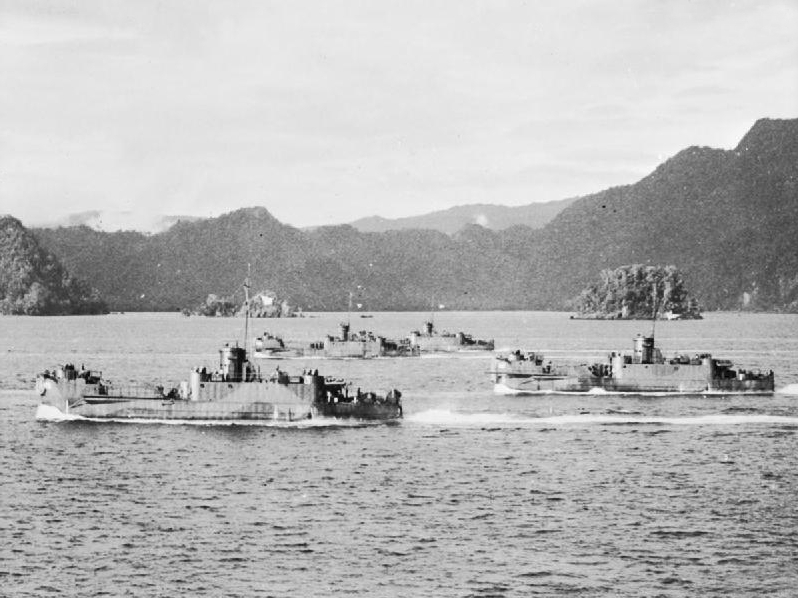
US landing craft cross Humboldt Bay

Three transports were assigned to the operation, Westralia, Gunston Hall and Ganymede. Eight waves landed at White 1 after two LCIs fired rockets at the high ground overlooking the beach where several Japanese antiaircraft guns were located. Over the course of an hour, this feature, dubbed Pancake Hill, was captured with only minimal opposition. The large majority of the defending Japanese troops there had uncharacteristically abandoned their positions and fled inland. One company landed on White 2 and secured Cape Tjeweri, after which a group of 18 LVTs crossed the sandspit to land two more companies near Pim inside Jautefa Bay.

Seven LSTs and the Australian transport Westralia were unloaded over the shore at White 1, landing 4,200 tonnes of combat supplies and over 300 vehicles on the first day. The beach quickly became congested, as it had also been the center of a Japanese supply dump prior to the assault, and engineers had to work to clear the area with bulldozers and construct a roadway to the beach's only exit. A fire caused by Allied bombing continued to burn in the Japanese supply dump for several days and later attracted the attention of a Japanese bomber, which attacked the beach area late on 23 April, resulting in more fires and killing 24 and wounding 100 more. This attack also destroyed 60 percent of all rations and ammunition that had been landed, and resulted in shortages amongst the infantry advancing towards the airfields. On 24 April, the beach became more congested with the arrival of scheduled reinforcements and further equipment, as well as two transports and seven LSTs carrying troops, including the corps commander and his headquarters, which had been diverted from Tanahmerah Bay. To ease the congestion on White 1, 11 LSTs were landed off White 2, while engineers from the 2nd Engineer Special Brigade worked to clear the beach, shifting stores and equipment into Jautefa Bay.

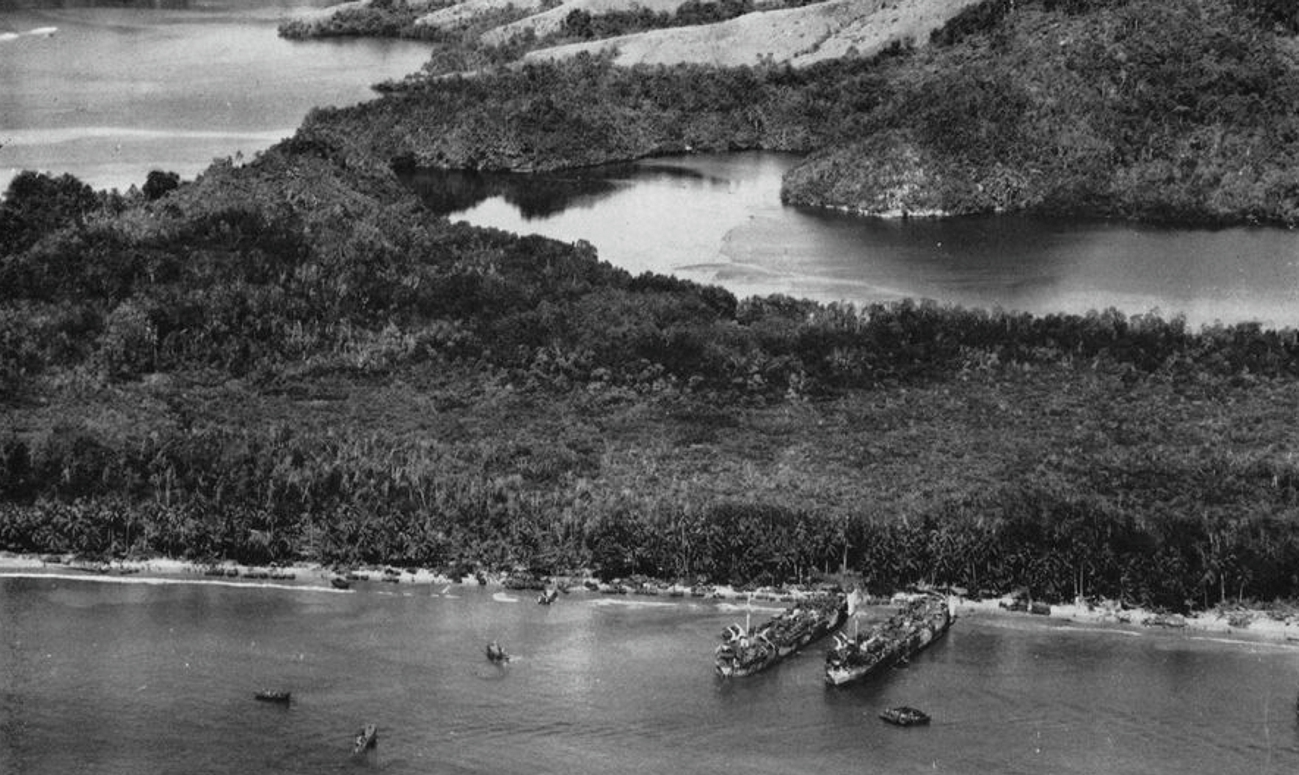
LSTs at Hollandia, 22 April 1944

Meanwhile, the infantry continued their advance inland. By the end of the day on 23 April the 186th Infantry were about halfway to Lake Sentani, while those from the 162nd had secured Hollandia and were securing the high ground around their objective, winkling out isolated pockets of resistance with aerial support. There was little resistance initially, but further inland there was some opposition as elements of the 186th Infantry reached the lake by 24 April. Engineers operating amphtracks pushed forward from Jautefa Bay to the lake to carry the infantry around the Japanese positions at the lake, completing their flanking maneuver on 25 April. By 26 April, U.S. troops secured the two eastern airfields, and later that day linked up with forces advancing from the 24th Division advancing from Tanahmerah Bay. The fires around White 1 continued until 27 April when the engineers were released to return to the beach. The stores situation in the forward area grew more urgent as the supply line up the single road broke down. Aerial resupply brought some relief, and on 30 April a group of 12 LCTs, towed by several LSTs, arrived at Humboldt Bay. The situation was not fully resolved until 3 May when transport aircraft began landing on an airstrip that was hastily built by an engineer aviation battalion at Tami.

According to historian Stanley Kirby, the collapse of Japanese resistance was due to a lack of preparedness, changes in the command structure and a lack of combat troops; many of the 11,000 men based there were administrative and support units. None of the senior officers present had been in post more than a few weeks and the senior air officer had been relieved following the destruction of his air forces at the beginning of April. Neither Kitazono nor Endo had been able to prepare a comprehensive defensive plan, and in any event had neither the men nor the resources to carry it out. On the other hand, the Allied operation had been over-insured; concerns over the strength of the Japanese garrison had left the Allies with a four to one advantage in the event. Historian Edward J. Drea attributed the success of the operation largely to MacArthur's bold decision to exploit intelligence gained through code breaking, and judged it was "MacArthur's finest hour in World War II and ULTRA's single greatest contribution to the general's Pacific strategy". Stephen R. Taaffe reached a similar conclusion.

== Aftermath ==
Japanese casualties amounted to 3,300 killed and 600 wounded in combat; a further 1,146 were killed or died in the area up to 27 September 1944. A total of 7,200 Japanese troops assembled at Genjem and then attempted to withdraw overland to Sarmi; only around 1,000 reached their destination. Allied casualties amounted to 157 killed and 1,057 wounded. U.S. forces undertook mopping up operations in the area until 6 June.

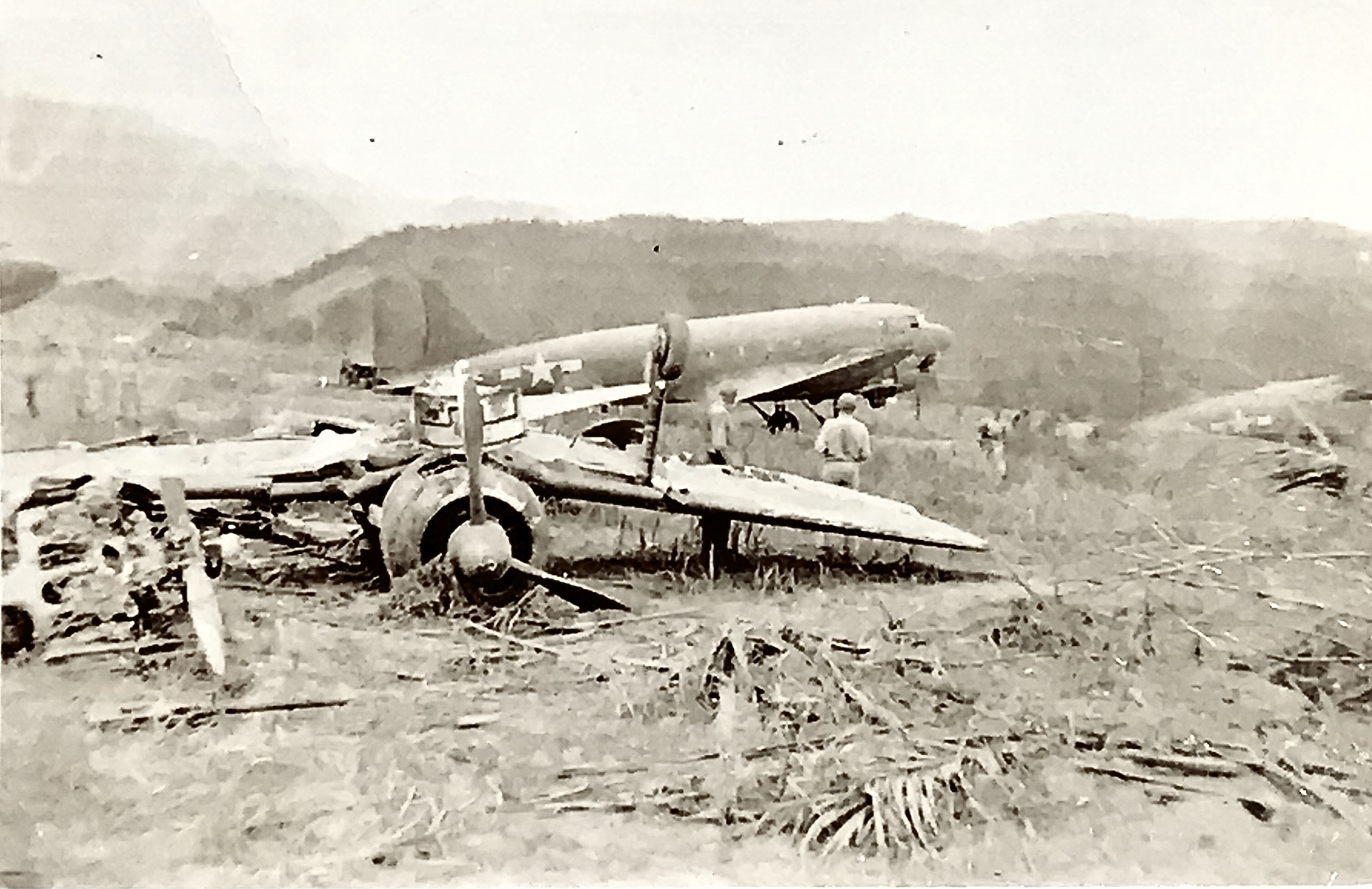
The day after the airstrip at Hollandia was taken

Operation Reckless was an unqualified success, as were the landings around Aitape under the guise of Operation Persecution. The loss of Hollandia made the Japanese strategic defense line at Wakde, to the west, and all Japanese positions to the east untenable. Japanese forces to the west were reconfigured to form a defense line through Biak and Manokwari, while the Japanese 18th Army, still in defensive positions around Wewak, to the east, were faced with a long retreat west through the jungle having been ordered to bypass Hollandia and Aitape and reinforce the 2nd Army in western New Guinea. This plan was eventually reversed in favor of a counterattack on U.S. forces around Aitape.

Meanwhile, the Allies quickly made the Sentani airfields operational and were able to mount bombing raids on Japanese positions as far west as Biak, making them useless for air operations. The landings at Hollandia and Aitape were followed just four weeks later by landings at Wakde, Sarmi and Toem, to the west. In mid-July, the Japanese launched their counterattack with around 20,000 troops, resulting in heavy fighting further inland during the Battle of Driniumor River. Both Humboldt and Tanahmerah were developed with naval base, ammunition, repair and fuel facilities. The facilities in the area were designated Base G. Several higher headquarters were moved to the area, including those of the Sixth Army, Eighth Army, Fifth Air Force, and Seventh Fleet. Base G played an important role as a staging area for subsequent operations in New Guinea and the Philippines.

== See also ==
- Naval Base Hollandia
- Indonesia in World War II

== Sources ==
- Clodfelter, Micheal (2017). Warfare and Armed Conflicts: A Statistical Encyclopedia of Casualty and Other Figures, 1492–2015 (4th ed.). Jefferson, North Carolina: McFarland. ISBN 978-147662-585-0.
- Drea, Edward J. (1992). MacArthur's ULTRA: Codebreaking and the war against Japan, 1942–1945. Lawrence: University of Kansas Press. ISBN 978-0-7006-0504-0.
- Futrell, Frank (1950). "Hollandia". In Craven, Wesley Frank; Cate, James Lea (eds.). The Army Air Forces in World War II: Vol. IV, The Pacific: Guadalcanal to Saipan, August 1942 to July 1944. U.S. Office of Air Force History. pp. 575–646. OCLC 909927818.
- Gill, G Herman (1968). Royal Australian Navy, 1942–1945. Australia in the War of 1939–1945. Vol. Series 2 – Navy. Volume II. Canberra: Australian War Memorial. OCLC 65475.
- Keogh, Eustace (1965). South West Pacific 1941–45. Melbourne, Victoria: Grayflower Publications. OCLC 7185705.
- Kirby, S. Woodburn (1962). The War against Japan. Vol. III: The Decisive Battles. London: HMSO. OCLC 632441219.
- McCartney, William F. (1948). The Jungleers: A History of the 41st Infantry Division (1st ed.). Washington, D.C.: Infantry Journal Press. OCLC 2339701.
- Morison, S.E. (1960) [1953]. New Guinea and the Marianas: March 1944 – August 1944. History of United States Naval Operations in World War II. Vol. VIII. Boston: Little, Brown. OCLC 174795561.
- Roskill, S.W. (1960). The War at Sea 1939–1945. Volume III: The Offensive Part I. London: Her Majesty's Stationery Office. OCLC 58588186.
- Smith, Robert Ross (1953). The Approach to the Philippines. The United States Army in World War II. Washington, D.C.: United States Army Center of Military History. OCLC 570739529.
- Taaffe, Stephen R. (1998). MacArthur's Jungle War: The 1944 New Guinea Campaign. Lawrence, Kansas: University Press of Kansas. ISBN 978-0-7006-0870-6.
- Young, Gordon Russell (1959). Army Almanac: A Book of Facts Concerning the Army of the United States. Washington, D.C.: United States Government Printing Office. OCLC 1022243.
