= Carter Hall (Millwood, Virginia) =

Historic house in Virginia, United States

- U.S. National Register of Historic Places
- Virginia Landmarks Register
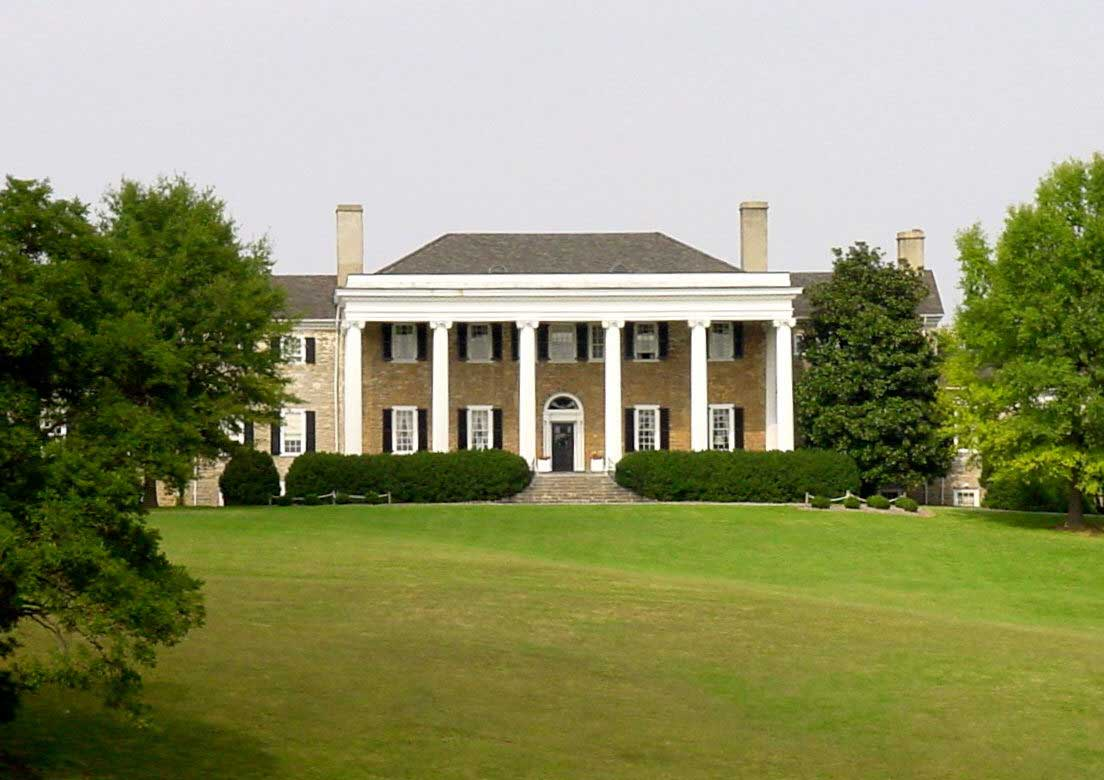
- Carter Hall

- Location within Northern Virginia Location within Virginia Location within the United States
- Location: NE of Millwood off VA 255, Millwood, Virginia, U.S.
- Coordinates: 39°4′21.3″N 78°1′56.1″W
- Area: 90 acres (36 ha)
- Built: 1792
- Architect: Wade Muldoon (1948 gardens); Harrie T. Lindeberg (1930 remodel)
- Architectural style: Georgian
- NRHP reference No.: 73002003
- VLR No.: 021-0012

Significant dates
- Added to NRHP: July 24, 1973
- Designated VLR: June 19, 1973

Carter Hall was the Millwood, Virginia, USA estate of Lt. Col. Nathaniel Burwell (1750–1814). It is located in the lower Shenandoah Valley, off Virginia Route 255 northeast of Millwood. The estate includes a grand plantation house, a great lawn, and terraced gardens, and has panoramic views in all directions. It is listed on the National Register of Historic Places.

== History ==
Nathaniel Burwell (1750–1814) inherited a 5,800-acre (2,347 ha) estate from his father Carter Burwell, including Carter's Grove, James City County, and about 5000 acres in what was then Frederick County. He developed the land with the Burwell-Morgan Mill and normally spent summers nearby (the Blue Ridge Mountains' foothills being cooler and less subject to malaria than the Hampton Roads area). After the American Revolutionary War and his first wife's death, Col. Burwell remarried and with the assistance of former General Daniel Morgan began building the plantation house he called 'Carter Hall' during 1792–1800. Col. Nathaniel Burwell at his peak owned 8000 acres and enslaved more than 200 people in Frederick County; the next largest landowners enslaving 53, 43 and 28 people. Col. Burwell would die at Carter Hall in 1814, but his estate would not settle until his widow's death in 1843. Carter Hall would be inherited by one of his sons by his second wife, George Harrison Burwell (1799–1873). Col. Burwell invited his cousin, U.S. Founding Father Edmund Randolph, who had been Governor of Virginia, United States Attorney General and later Secretary of State under George Washington, to pass his retirement at Carter Hall. Both are buried outside Old Chapel (Millwood, Virginia), built in 1790 on land donated by Col. Burwell, and sometimes referred to as the "Burwell graveyard" because of succeeding generations of this branch of the Burwell family buried there.

Col. Burwell's son Nathaniel Burwell Jr. (1779–1849) helped to form Clarke County from the eastern part Frederick County and at nearly 2400 acres and 52 enslaved people was its largest landowners. He served as one its justices of the peace at various times, as well as its joint delegate in the Virginia General Assembly with neighboring Warren County (which the Castleman family dominated), but lived at Saratoga (Boyce, Virginia), a plantation he bought from Gen. Morgan in 1809 after the retired soldier moved to Winchester to live with his family.

Carter Hall has a five-bay central block built of local limestone, originally with a central hall flanked by rooms extending the full depth of the house (single-pile plan). The flanking two-bay wings have pediment gable ends and the outermost, single-story wings are of a single bay, formerly with pediment ends. G.H. Burwell added the large portico, which is "by tradition" ascribed to a design of William Thornton, architect of the United States Capitol.

Two navy ships have been named after this plantation. The first USS Carter Hall (LSD-3) was an Ashland-class dock landing ship in service from 1943 to 1947 and was Recommissioned from 1961 until 1969. The second USS Carter Hall (LSD-50) is a Harpers Ferry-class dock landing ship commissioned in 1995 and still in use today.

=== Civil War ===
It served as headquarters for Stonewall Jackson during part of the American Civil War, and was raided and sacked by Union troops during the war. Stonewall Jackson used another house, in Lexington, Virginia, as headquarters during 1861–1862, and established headquarters at Carter Hall during the fall of 1862. Jackson "declined George Burwell's invitation to stay in the house, camping instead with his men on the grounds. During his stay General Jackson permitted his surgeon, Dr. Hunter McGuire, to perform a cataract operation on George Burwell on the portico."

George's son, C.S.A. private Nathaniel Burwell (1838–1862) fought in the Stonewall Brigade and ultimately died that fall of wounds sustained at the Second Battle of Bull Run. Several more of Col. Nathaniel Burwell's great-grandsons enlisted in the Confederate army, including three sons of his grandson (through his son William Nelson Burwell of 'Glenowen', d. 1822) Nathaniel Burwell (1819–1896), with Robert dying of wounds received at the Battle of Brandy Station, George later becoming a mercenary in Mexico, sons Philip, John and William surviving and becoming physicians, and their youngest brother Thomas (1861–1923) farming and inheriting Carter Hall.

=== 1930 remodel ===
The house was remodeled in 1930 for its new owner Gerard Lambert "under the direction of the fashionable New York architect, H.T. Lindeberg," and a four-level terraced garden designed by landscape architect Wade Muldoon was added in 1948. The stucco was removed from the exterior to expose the stone. In the house the central hall and east room were combined into a single space and the original wainscoting was replaced with richly detailed neo-Georgian details based on woodwork at Shirley Plantation, Virginia. The dining room is the only room to retain significant portions of its original fittings.

Carter Hall was listed on the National Register of Historic Places in 1973.

=== Present day ===
Acquired in 1978 it is currently a conference center owned by Project Hope. The organization on November 27, 2018, placed the center with 87 acres (35 ha) on the market for $12,000,000 (~$14.7 million in 2024).

== See also ==
- Stonewall Jackson Headquarters, Winchester, Virginia
- USS Carter Hall
