= USS Carter Hall =

USS Carter Hall may refer to the following ships of the United States Navy:

- USS Carter Hall (LSD-3) was an Ashland-class dock landing ship, launched in 1943 and struck in 1969
- USS Carter Hall (LSD-50) is a Harpers Ferry-class dock landing ship, launched in 1993 and currently in active service
