= USS Ganymede =

Cargo ship of the United States Navy

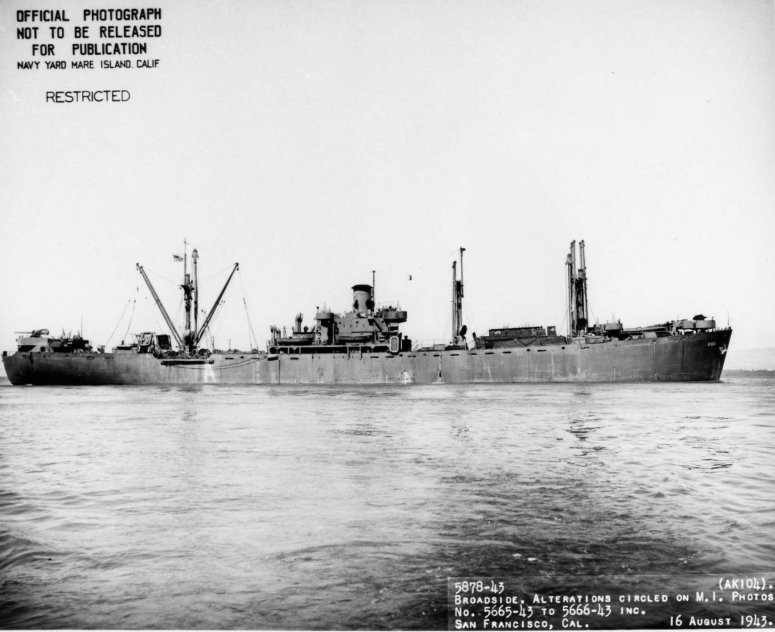
- USS Ganymede (AK-104) (broadside plan view) in San Francisco Bay, 16 August 1943.

History

United States
- Name: James W. Nye; Ganymede
- Namesake: James W. Nye; The moon Ganymede
- Ordered: as a Type EC2-S-C1 hull, MCE hull 1571
- Builder: Permanente Metals Corporation, Richmond, California
- Yard number: 1571
- Way number: 3
- Laid down: 16 May 1943
- Launched: 8 June 1943
- Sponsored by: Mrs. William C. Dalby
- Acquired: 23 June 1943
- Commissioned: 31 July 1943
- Decommissioned: 15 April 1946
- Stricken: 1 August 1947
- Identification: Hull symbol: AK-104; Code letters: NTNH
- Fate: Sold for scrapping, 19 March 1973

General characteristics
- Class & type: Crater-class cargo ship
- Displacement: 4,023 long tons (4,088 t) (standard); 14,550 long tons (14,780 t) (full load)
- Length: 441 ft 6 in (134.57 m)
- Beam: 56 ft 11 in (17.35 m)
- Draft: 28 ft 4 in (8.64 m)
- Installed power: 2 × Combustion Engineering header-type boilers, 220psi 450°; 2,500 shp (1,900 kW)
- Propulsion: 1 × Joshua Hendy vertical triple-expansion reciprocating steam engine; 1 × shaft
- Speed: 12.5 kn (23.2 km/h; 14.4 mph)
- Capacity: 7,800 t (7,700 long tons) DWT; 444,206 cu ft (12,578.5 m^{3}) (non-refrigerated)
- Complement: 219
- Armament: 1 × 5 in (127 mm)/38 caliber dual-purpose gun; 2 × 40 mm (1.6 in) 40mm Bofors anti-aircraft (AA) gun mounts; 6 × 20 mm (0.8 in) Oerlikon cannons AA gun mounts

USS Ganymede (AK-104) was a Crater-class cargo ship commissioned by the US Navy for service in World War II. She was responsible for delivering troops, goods and equipment to locations in the war zone. Named after the largest of the moons of Jupiter, Ganymede was the only ship of the Navy to bear this name.

== Construction ==
Ganymede, was laid down 16 May 1943, as liberty ship SS James W. Nye, MCE hull 1571, by the Permanente Metals Corporation, Yard No.2, Richmond, California, under Maritime Commission (MARCOM) contract; authorized for acceptance by the US Navy on 22 May 1943; classified as a cargo ship, AK-104, and renamed Ganymede on 27 May 1943. She was launched 8 June 1943; sponsored by Mrs. William C. Dalby of Oakland, California; assigned to the General Engineering & Dry Dock Co. for conversion on 19 June 1943; acquired 23 June 1943; commissioned 31 July 1943.

== Service history ==
After shakedown training out of Oakland, Ganymede departed San Francisco, 28 August 1943, carrying military cargo to Pallikulo Bay, New Hebrides, and to Queensland, Melbourne, and Sydney, Australia. The ship was one of five Navy manned Liberties assigned 8 December 1943 to the Southwest Pacific Area for service under operational control of the Commander, Seventh Fleet in meeting US Army requirements. Assigned to the Seventh Fleet Service Force, she sailed from Queensland on 29 November 1943, with fuel, supplies, and passengers for Milne and Langemak Bays, New Guinea and thence returned to Australia.

During the next 12 months she transported military cargo of many types and provided limited passenger service from ports of Australia to bases in New Guinea, including Humboldt Bay, Milne Bay, Cape Sudest and Tanahmerah Bay. Her itinerary was expanded in February 1945, to include Leyte, Manila, Subic Bay and Samar in the Philippines, with occasional calls at Manus, Admiralty Islands.

Ganymede continued her busy Australia–New Guinea–Philippines–Australia supply circuit until 20 November when she departed Brisbane, Australia for the United States arriving San Francisco 18 December. She remained in port until 25 February 1946, when she sailed for Pearl Harbor to take part in special explosive tests prior to her decommissioning there 15 April 1946.

== Post-war decommissioning ==
Towed back to San Francisco, her name was struck from the Navy List 1 August 1947, and she was returned to the War Shipping Administration (WSA) on 1 October 1947, and entered the National Defense Reserve Fleet at Suisun Bay, California. She was sold on 19 March 1973, to Tung Ho Steel Enterprise Corporation, of Taiwan, for $137,000. She was delivered on 16 April 1973.

== Awards ==
Ganymede crew members were eligible for the following medals:

- American Campaign Medal
- Asiatic-Pacific Campaign Medal
- World War II Victory Medal

== Notes ==
Citations

== Bibliography ==
Online resources

- "Ganymede (AK-104)". Dictionary of American Naval Fighting Ships. Naval History and Heritage Command. 17 August 2016. This article incorporates text from this source, which is in the public domain.
- "Kaiser Permanente No. 2, Richmond CA". ShipbuildingHistory.com. 13 October 2010.
- "USS Ganymede (AK-104)". NavSource. 14 September 2013.
- "GANYMEDE (AK-104)". United States Department of Transportation. Archived from the original on 12 December 2019.
- Masterson, Dr. James R. (1949). U. S. Army Transportation In The Southwest Pacific Area 1941-1947. Washington, D. C.: Transportation Unit, Historical Division, Special Staff, U. S. Army.
