= Port of Depapre =

- Click on the map for a fullscreen view

Location
- Country: Indonesia
- Location: Depapre District, Jayapura Regency, Papua
- Coordinates: 2.461453°S 140.367929°E

Details
- Operated by: Pelabuhan Indonesia IV
- Type of harbour: Coastal natural

Statistics
- Website inaport4.co.id/branch/read/2/2

Port of Depapre is an under-construction container and bulk cargo seaport in Jayapura Regency, Papua, Indonesia. The port located in Tanahmerah Bay, directly facing the Pacific Ocean in the north. The port is being planned to replace the old Port of Jayapura, located 30 km to the east. The port is also located about 27 km west of Sentani, the regencial capital of Jayapura Regency, and 60 km west of Jayapura, the provincial capital of Papua.
