= MV Danica White =

History
- Name: MV Danica White
- Owner: Partrederiet Invest Vi
- Operator: H. Folmer & Co., Copenhagen
- Port of registry: (Denmark) Nakskov
- Launched: 1985
- Identification: IMO number: 8401157; Call sign: OXMG2; Registration number: D 2995

General characteristics
- Type: Bulk carrier
- Tonnage: 997 gt 1,563 dwt
- Length: 61.55 m (201 ft 11 in)
- Installed power: 588 kW (789 hp)
- Crew: 6

The Danish-owned cargo ship MV Danica White was hijacked and maneuvered into Somali waters on 1 June 2007. On 3 June 2007, USS Carter Hall, a Harpers Ferry-class dock landing ship engaged the pirates, firing machine-gun bursts at the skiffs in tow behind the Danish ship, but failed to stop them. Following 83 days in captivity, the crew of five and the ship were released after the owner, H. Folmer & Co, paid a ransom of 723,000 United States dollars, which was negotiated down from $1.5 million.
