= USS Carter Hall (LSD-50) =

American dock landing ship

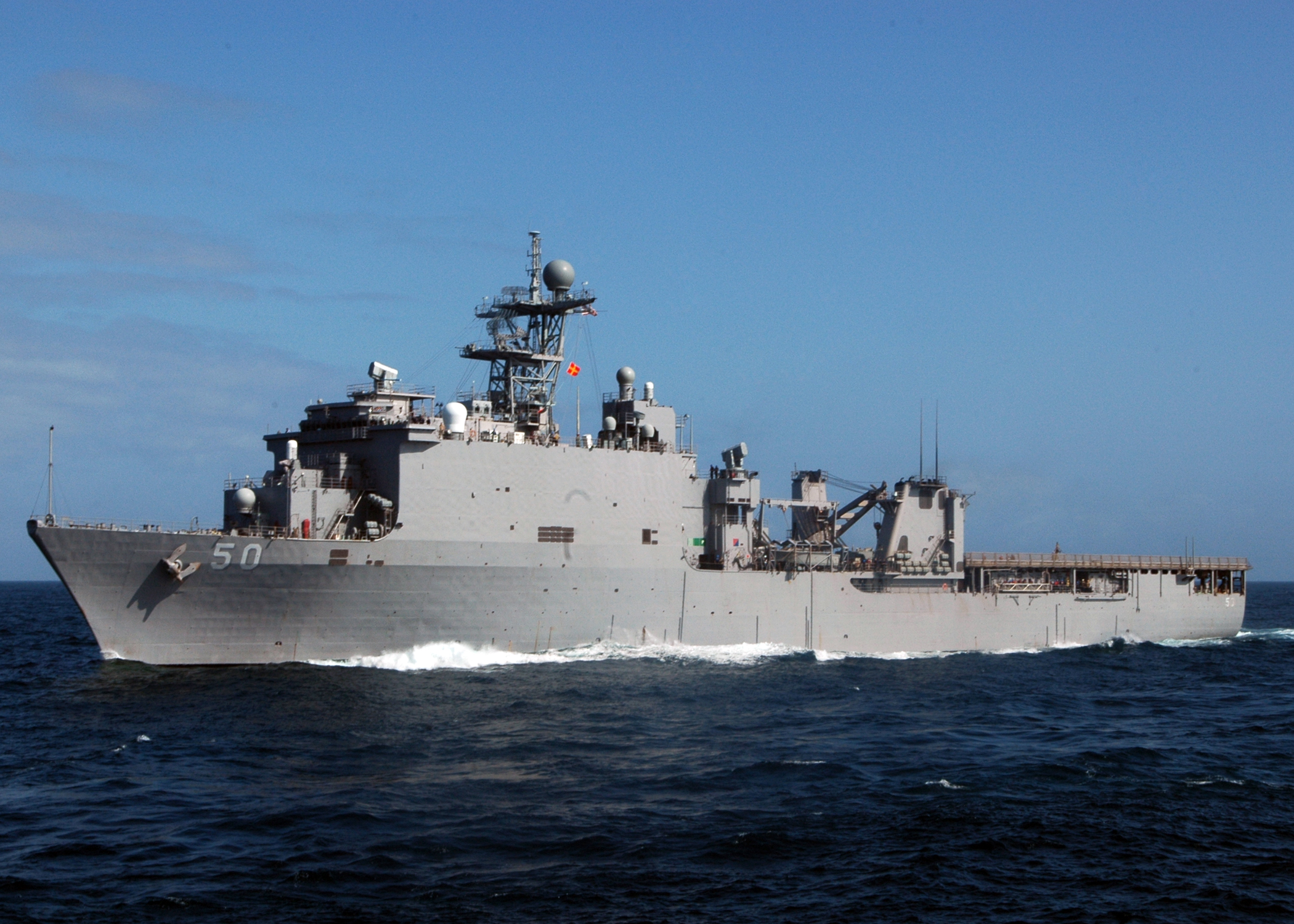
- Carter Hall cruising the Indian Ocean, 7 October 2007

History

United States
- Namesake: Carter Hall in Virginia
- Ordered: 22 December 1989
- Laid down: 11 November 1991
- Launched: 2 October 1993
- Commissioned: 30 September 1995
- Home port: JEBLC, Virginia
- Motto: Working For Peace Ready For War
- Status: in active service
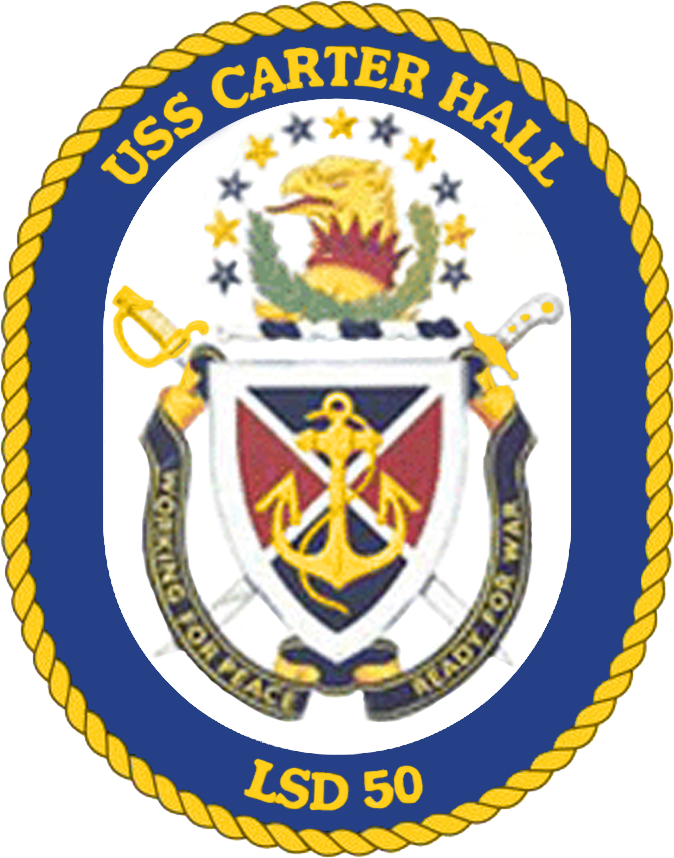
- Badge

General characteristics
- Class & type: Harpers Ferry-class dock landing ship
- Displacement: 11,471 tons (light); 16,360 tons (full)
- Length: 610 ft (190 m)
- Beam: 84 ft (26 m)
- Draft: 21 ft (6.4 m)
- Propulsion: 4 Colt Industries, 16-cylinder diesel engines, 2 shafts, 33,000 shp (25,000 kW)
- Speed: over 20 knots (37 km/h; 23 mph)
- Boats & landing craft carried: LCACs or 1 LCU or four LCM-8 or nine LCM-6
- Capacity: 15 Amphibious Assault Vehicles (AAV), 4 M1 Abrams tanks
- Complement: 24 officers, 397 enlisted; Marine detachment: 402 + 102 surge
- Armament: 2 × 25 mm Mk 38 cannons; 2 × 20 mm Phalanx CIWS mounts; 2 × Rolling Airframe Missile launchers; 6 × .50 caliber M2HB machine guns

USS Carter Hall (LSD-50) is a Harpers Ferry-class dock landing ship of the United States Navy. She is the second US Navy ship to be named for Carter Hall, an estate near Winchester, Virginia, built in the 1790s.

Carter Hall was laid down on 11 November 1991 by the Avondale Shipyards at New Orleans, Louisiana. The ship was launched on 2 October 1993 and commissioned on 30 September 1995.

As of July 2023, Carter Hall, along with USS Bataan (LHD-5) and elements of the 26th Marine Expeditionary Unit, are being dispatched to U.S. Central Command in the Middle East as part of the U.S. response to Iran's continued seizure of commercial vessels in the Strait of Hormuz.

== Overview ==
The mission of the Landing Ship Dock (LSD) is to transport and launch amphibious craft, vehicles, crews and embarked personnel in an amphibious assault. An LSD can also render limited docking and repair service to small ships and craft, and act as the Primary Control Ship (PCS) during amphibious assaults.

Carter Hall is a Cargo Variant (CV) of the Whidbey Island class. A significant difference between the two classes is that Carter Hall's well deck has been shortened from 440 feet (130 m) to 180 feet (55 m). This provides Marines with added vehicle and cargo storage areas. The well deck can hold two Landing Craft Air Cushions (LCAC) and a variety of landing craft and tracked amphibious assault vehicles. Carter Hall's two-spot flight deck can land and service any helicopter in the Navy and Marine Corps inventory.

== History ==
=== 1990s ===
Carter Hall and her plankowner crew departed on their first six-month Mediterranean deployment on 29 April 1997. Her crew completed a UNITAS/WATC Deployment from 24 July 1999 until 15 December 1999.

=== 2000s ===
In 2001, Carter Hall deployed to the Mediterranean Sea from 15 April to 15 October 2001.

In 2003, she deployed as part of the Iwo Jima Amphibious Ready Group (ARG) with the 26th Marine Expeditionary Unit. During a ten-month deployment, she assisted in combat in OIF/OEF.

On 2 June 2007, Carter Hall engaged pirates after they boarded the Danish ship MV Danica White off the coast of Somalia. The LSD destroyed three small boats being towed behind the captured vessel, but was unable to pursue after the vessel entered Somalian waters.

=== 2010s ===
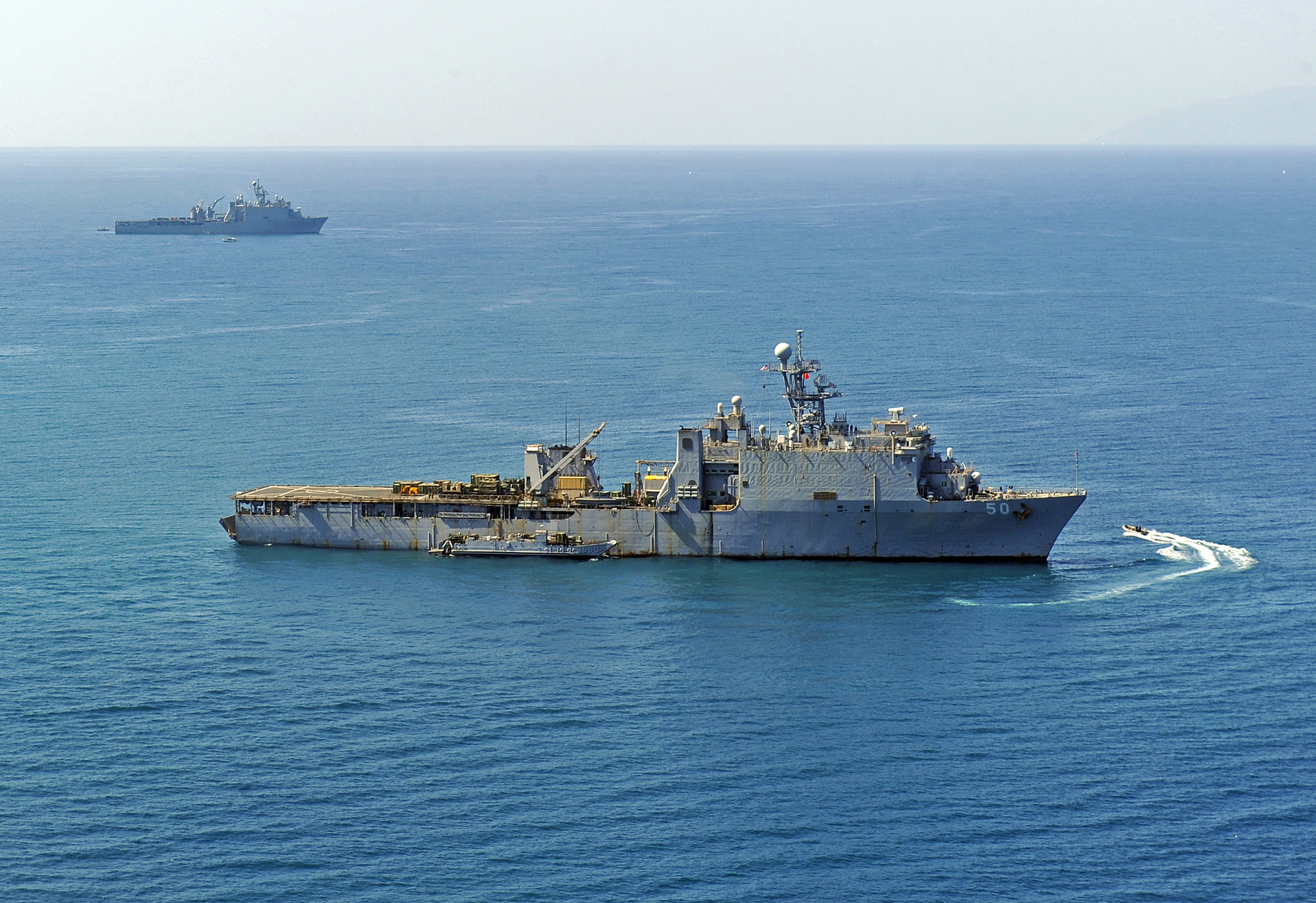
Carter Hall and Fort McHenry operate off the coast of Haiti during Operation Unified Response, 22 January 2010.

On 13 January 2010, Carter Hall was ordered to assist the humanitarian efforts following the 2010 Haiti earthquake.

On 31 October 2012, Carter Hall was sent towards the Hurricane Sandy impact area in case the United States Navy was needed to support the disaster relief efforts.

In April 2016, one of Carter Hall's sailors died after falling overboard from the ship. Navy and Coast Guard units searched for the sailor, but to no avail.

=== 2020s ===
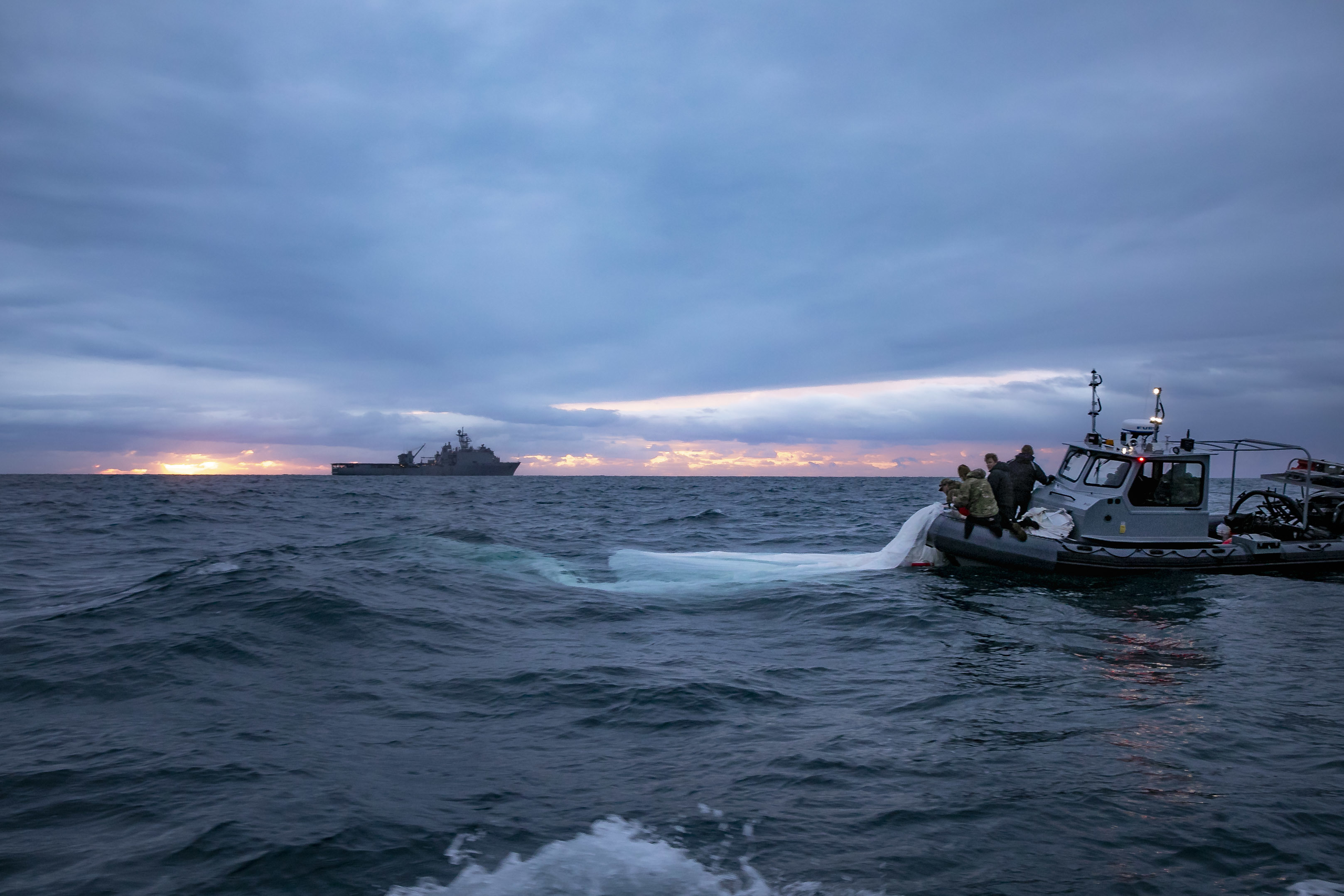
Carter Hall participating in the recovery of the Chinese surveillance balloon

On 1 June 2020, the Navy reported that two weeks prior, several crew members assigned to Carter Hall had tested positive for COVID-19. The exact number of sailors infected was not disclosed due to Defense Department policy, but those infected were "being checked on each day by their leadership [and] receiving deliveries of food and essential items". At the time, the ship was docked at her home base. Most of the roughly 400 crew members were brought ashore while the ship was being sanitized.

In December 2020 the US Navy's Report to Congress on the Annual Long-Range Plan for Construction of Naval Vessels stated that the ship was planned to be placed Out of Commission in Reserve in 2023.

==== 2021 Deployment ====
In 2021, The Ship took part in Operation Allies Refuge, with the USS Iwo Jima (LHD 7) and USS San Antonio (LPD 17), as part of their deployment. In that deployment, 13 personnel were in the bombing in Kabul, Afghanistan on August 27.

The ship was one of several US Navy vessels present in the Atlantic near a suspected Chinese espionage balloon that was downed by the United States on 4 February 2023. The crew had stayed out longer, (originally returning to port on February 6), within the vicinity of the sunken parts in response to the spyballoon being sunk.

=== 2023: The Red Sea Crisis ===
On 10 July 2023, Bataan ARG, comprising Bataan, USS Carter Hall (LSD-50), and USS Mesa Verde (LPD-19), departed Norfolk for a scheduled deployment.

Due to continued tensions with Iran, the Navy deployed Carter Hall, along with amphibious assault ship USS Bataan (LHD-5), to the Gulf area via the Red Sea, in August 2023.

On 11 October 2023, while operating in the Persian Gulf Carter Hall, with the 26th Marine Expeditionary Unit (Special Operations Capable), along with Bataan, were ordered to leave exercises off Kuwait to potentially sail to the Mediterranean due to the ongoing Gaza war. The Carter Hall and Bataan operated in the Red Sea from October to December 2023 before transiting the Suez Canal north to the eastern Mediterranean Sea. The crews of both ships were subsequently awarded the Combat Action Ribbon for actions performed while in the Red Sea.

== Ship's coat of arms ==
The colors of the field red, white, and blue, stand for the United States. The saltire recalls the heritage of the South in the history of Carter Hall in Millwood, Virginia. The anchor represents the Navy. The times are in the form of pheons, symbolizing the mission of support to assault operations. The loose rope intertwined with the anchor signifies freedom. The border denotes unity. Dark blue and gold are the colors traditional associated with the Navy; red for courage, white for integrity. The griffin denotes courage and vigilance. The crown refers to the heritage of Carter Hall, recalling the Great-grandfather of its builder, known as "King" Carter. The battle stars of the first Carter Hall (LSD-3) are commemorated by the arc of battle stars, five gold for her service in Vietnam. The motto is underscored by the olive branch for peace and the oak for war. Gold is for excellence and red for courage. The arms are emblazoned on a white oval enclosed by a blue collar edge on the outside with a gold rope and bearing the inscription "USS Carter Hall" at the top and "LSD-50" at the bottom in gold.
