= USS Oceanside =

1944 LSM-1-class landing ship medium

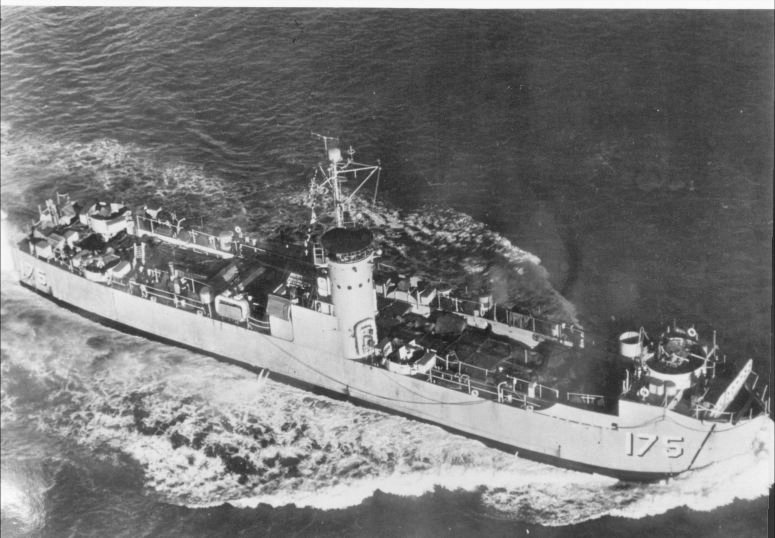
- USS Oceanside

History

United States
- Name: USS LSM–175
- Builder: Charleston Navy Yard
- Laid down: 11 July 1944
- Launched: 3 August 1944
- Commissioned: 25 September 1944
- Decommissioned: 11 July 1946
- Recommissioned: 8 September 1950
- Decommissioned: 30 October 1955
- In service: 30 October 1955
- Out of service: 1 February 1961
- Renamed: USS Oceanside (LSM-175), 14 October 1959
- Stricken: 1 February 1961
- Honors and awards: 1 battle star (World War II)
- Fate: Transferred to South Vietnam, 1 August 1961

South Vietnam
- Name: RVNS Huong Giang (HQ-404)
- Acquired: 1 August 1961
- Fate: Transferred to the Philippines, 17 November 1975

Philippines
- Name: BRP Batanes (LP65)
- Acquired: 17 November 1975
- Fate: Scrapped, 1989

General characteristics
- Class & type: LSM-1-class landing ship medium
- Displacement: 520 long tons (528 t) light; 743 long tons (755 t) landing; 1,095 long tons (1,113 t) full
- Length: 203 ft 6 in (62.03 m)
- Beam: 34 ft 6 in (10.52 m)
- Draft: Light : 3 ft 6 in (1.07 m) forward; 7 ft 8 in (2.34 m) aft; Full load : 6 ft 4 in (1.93 m) forward; 8 ft 3 in (2.51 m) aft
- Propulsion: 2 × General Motors (non-reversing with airflex clutch) diesels, direct drive with 1,440 bhp (1,074 kW) each at 720 rpm, twin screws
- Speed: 13.2 knots (24.4 km/h; 15.2 mph) (928 tons displacement)
- Capacity: 5 medium or 3 heavy tanks, or 6 LVT's, or 9 DUKW's
- Troops: 2 officers, 46 enlisted
- Complement: 5 officers, 54 enlisted
- Armament: 1 × single bow-mounted 40 mm gun; 4 × single 20 mm AA gun mounts
- Armor: 10-lb. STS splinter shield to gun mounts, pilot house and conning station

USS Oceanside (LSM-175) was one of 558 LSM-1-class landing ship medium (a form of amphibious assault ship) built for the United States Navy during World War II. Named for the town of Oceanside, California, she was the only U.S. Naval vessel to bear the name.

Originally laid down as LCT (7)–1675 on 11 July 1944 at the Charleston Navy Yard, she was launched on 3 August 1944, sponsored by Miss Emily V. Jackson; and commissioned on 25 September 1944 as USS LSM-175.

== Service history ==
=== World War II, 1944–1946 ===
Following a Chesapeake Bay shakedown, LSM–175 departed the east coast, transited the Panama Canal, and continued on to San Diego, arriving 1 December. From San Diego, she proceeded to San Francisco, then to Pearl Harbor and the Solomon Islands. Arriving at Florida Island on 20 February, she trained for her first campaign, Okinawa. She departed the Solomons on 12 March, staged at Ulithi, then steamed west, arriving off the Hagushi beaches on western Okinawa on 1 April. As the assault forces streamed ashore, LSM–175 unloaded transport and cargo vessels. At 0910 an enemy aircraft was taken under fire. In the course of the fight anti-aircraft projectiles struck in the LSM's well deck, wounding nine embarked marines and two "bluejackets". On the 6th, she again turned her guns on an enemy aircraft and assisted in splashing it 600 yards off the starboard bow. On 20 April she got underway for Ulithi, whence she steamed to Leyte, arriving on 28 May.

For the remainder of the war LSM–175 carried rolling stock and mixed cargo to the Marianas and amongst the Philippines, returning to Okinawa in mid-August. Through September she operated in the Philippines and in October shifted to Japan for brief duty with the occupation forces. Arriving in Tokyo Bay on 8 October she sailed for the United States in late November. On 26 December she arrived at San Diego, then, in February 1946 steamed to San Francisco where she decommissioned on 11 July 1946.

LSM–175 received one battle star for World War II service.

=== 1950–1955 ===
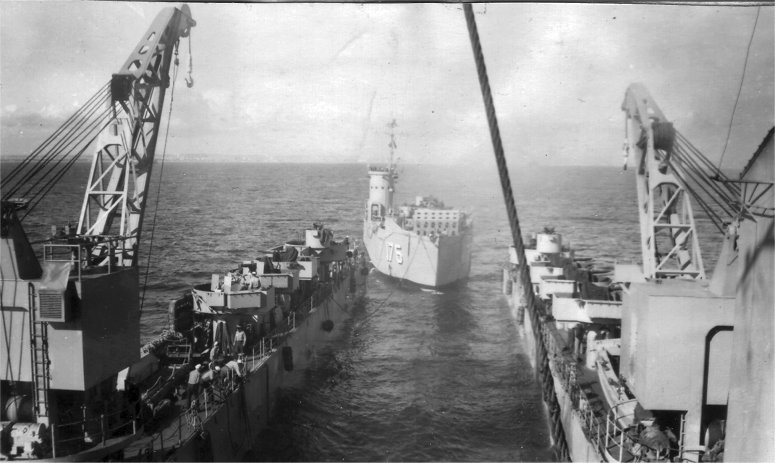
LSM-175 about to enter the well of the Carter Hall (LSD-3) in San Diego Bay in early 1951.

Reactivated four years later, LSM–175 was recommissioned on 8 September 1950. Homeported at San Diego, she trained marines and seabees in amphibious operations. On 30 June 1955 she was transferred to the 11th Naval District. On 30 October 1955 she was decommissioned and placed in service. Disarmed and with a reduced crew, the LSM then took up logistic support of the islands in that district. Homeported at Long Beach in October 1956, and renamed USS Oceanside (LSM-175) on 14 October 1959, she served the 11th Naval District until 1 February 1961, when she was placed out of service and struck from the Naval Vessel Register.

=== Vietnam and Philippine Navy, 1961–1989 ===
The ship was transferred to the custody of South Vietnam on 1 August 1961 to serve in the Republic of Vietnam Navy as RVNS Huong Giang (HQ-404). After the fall of Saigon on 30 April 1975, Huong Giang, under Commander Lương, escaped to the Philippines as part of a flotilla of Vietnam Navy ships under the overall leadership of Navy Captain Khương Hữu Bá. Huong Giang sailed to Subic Bay, where custody was transferred to the Philippines on 17 November 1975. The Philippine Navy renamed her BRP Batanes (LP65). The ship was disposed of in 1989. Her final fate is unknown.

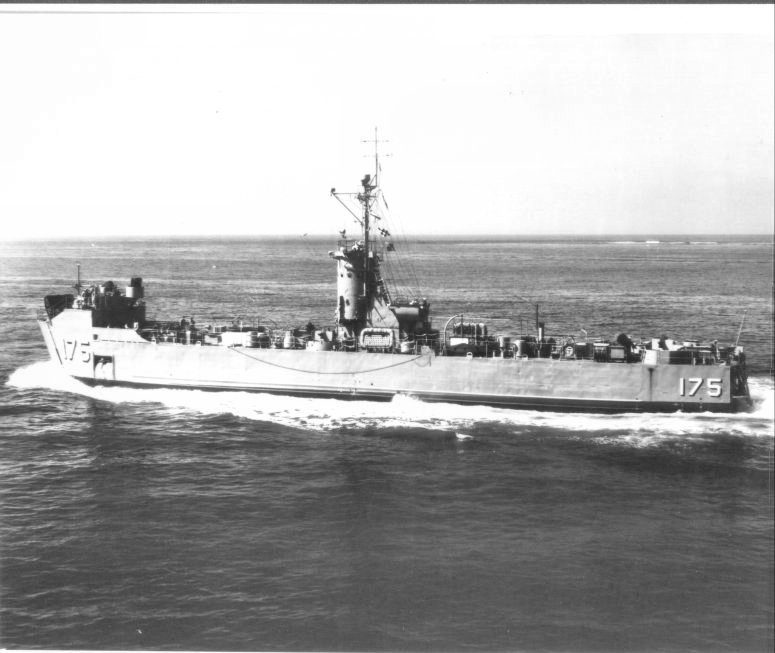
USS Oceanside (LSM-175) at sea, date and place unknown.

== See also ==
- Landing Ship Medium
