= USS Bataan (LHD-5) =

Wasp-class amphibious assault ship

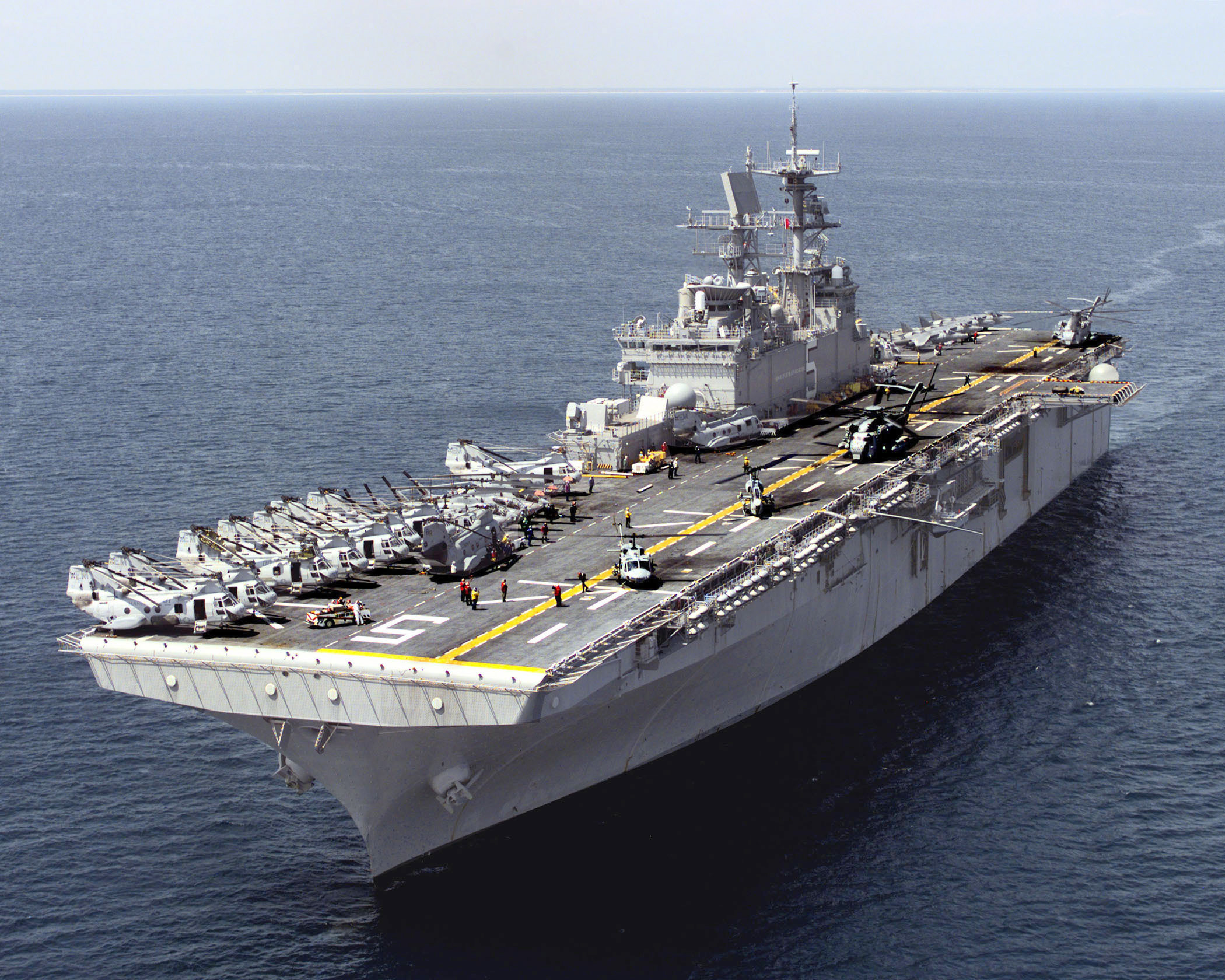
- USS Bataan underway in 1999

History

United States
- Name: Bataan
- Namesake: USS Bataan (CVL-29)
- Ordered: 20 December 1991
- Builder: Ingalls Shipbuilding
- Laid down: 22 June 1994
- Launched: 15 March 1996
- Christened: 18 May 1996
- Commissioned: 20 September 1997
- Home port: Norfolk
- Identification: MMSI number: 368958000; Callsign: NBAT; Hull number: LHD-5
- Motto: Honor, Courage, Commitment
- Status: in active service
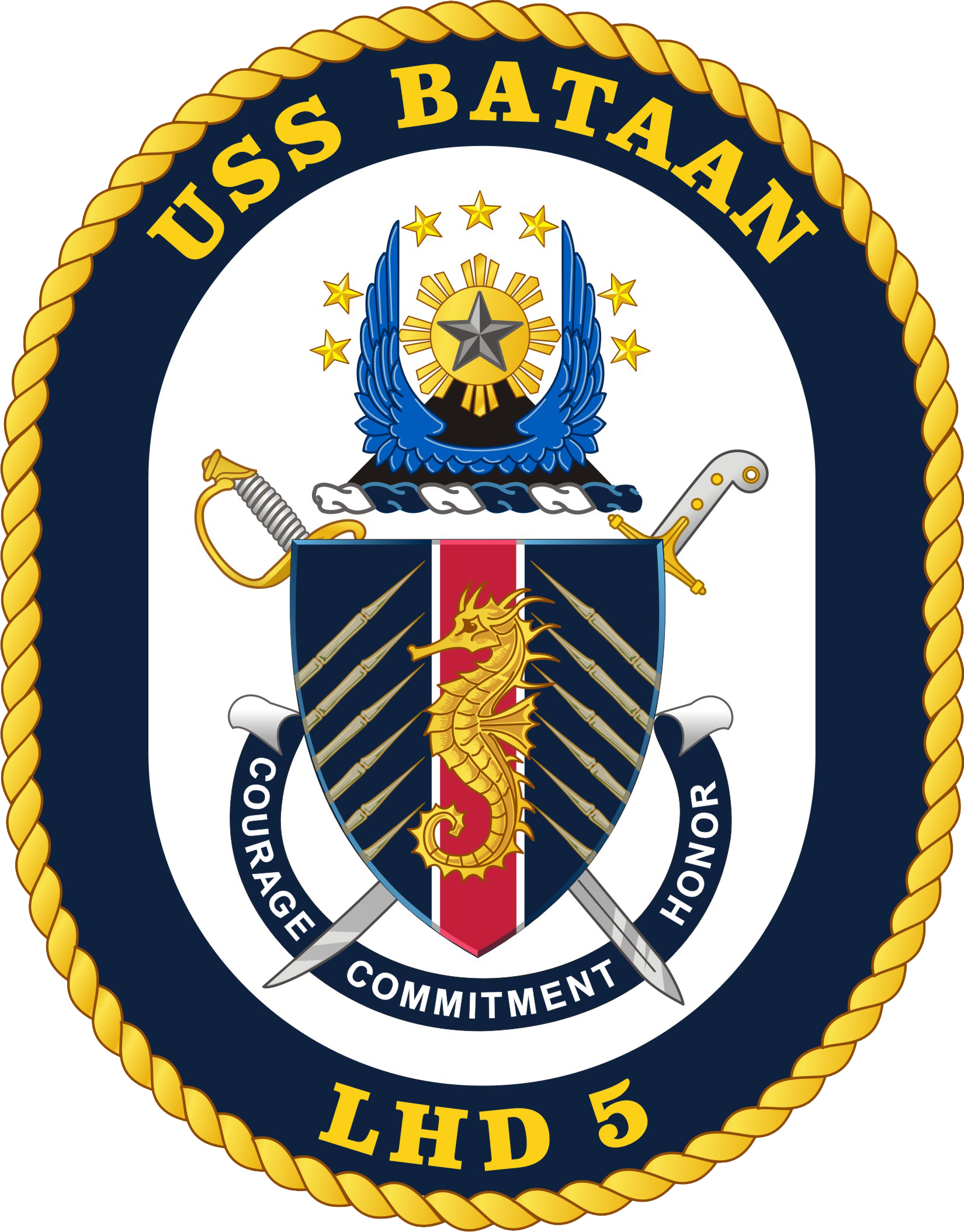
- Badge

General characteristics
- Type: Wasp-class amphibious assault ship
- Displacement: 40,500 long tons (41,150 t) full load
- Length: 843 ft (257 m)
- Beam: 104 ft (31.8 m)
- Draft: 27 ft (8.1 m)
- Propulsion: Two boilers, two geared steam turbines, two shafts, 70,000 shp (52,000 kW);
- Speed: 22 knots (41 km/h; 25 mph)
- Range: 9,500 nautical miles (17,600 km; 10,900 mi) at 18 kn (33 km/h; 21 mph)
- Well deck dimensions: 266-by-50-foot (81 by 15.2 m) by 28-foot (8.5 m) high
- Boats & landing craft carried: 3 Landing Craft Air Cushion or; 2 Landing Craft Utility or; 12 Landing Craft Mechanized
- Troops: 1,687 troops (plus 184 surge) Marine Detachment
- Complement: 1,208
- Sensors & processing systems: 1 AN/SPS-49 2-D Air Search Radar; 1 AN/SPS-48 3-D Air Search Radar; 1 AN/SPS-67 Surface Search Radar; 1 Mk23 Target Acquisition System (TAS); 1 AN/SPN-43 Marshalling Air Traffic Control Radar; 1 AN/SPN-35 Air Traffic Control Radar; 1 AN/URN-25 TACAN system; 1 AN/UPX-24 Identification Friend Foe
- Armament: Two RIM-116 Rolling Airframe Missile launchers; Two RIM-7 Sea Sparrow missile launchers; Two 20 mm Phalanx CIWS systems; Three 25 mm Mk 38 chain guns; Four .50 BMG machine guns
- Aircraft carried: Actual mix depends on the mission; Standard Complement: 6 AV-8B Harrier II attack aircraft; or; 6 F-35B Lightning II stealth strike-fighters; 4 AH-1W AH-1Z Viper Super Cobra /Viper attack helicopter; 12 MV-22B Osprey assault support tiltrotor; 4 CH-53E Super Stallion heavy-lift helicopters; 3–4 UH-1Y Venom utility helicopters; Assault: 22+ MV-22B Osprey assault support tiltrotor; Sea Control: 20 AV-8B Harrier II attack aircraft; or; 20 F-35B Lightning II stealth strike-fighters; 6 SH-60F/HH-60H ASW helicopters

USS Bataan (LHD-5) is a Wasp-class amphibious assault ship in the United States Navy. The ship is named after the Battle of Bataan, fought in the Philippines during World War II. The ship enables the U.S. Navy and U.S. Marine Corps team to seamlessly transition from the sea to a land battle, as the lead ship and centerpiece of an Amphibious Ready Group. She is capable of amphibious assault, advance force, and special purpose operations, as well as evacuation and humanitarian assistance.

== Commissioning ==
Ship's sponsor, Linda Sloan Mundy, wife of former Marine Corps Commandant Gen Carl E. Mundy, Jr., christened the new ship "in the name of the United States and in honor of the heroic defenders of Bataan" at Ingalls Shipbuilding, Pascagoula, Mississippi. More than 100 members of veterans groups associated with both the Battle of Bataan and the infamous "Bataan Death March" that followed, as well as the Battle of Corregidor, and the aircraft carrier Bataan (CVL-29), were at the christening ceremony. She was launched on 15 March 1996, and commissioned on 20 September 1997. Her homeport is Norfolk, Virginia.

== Capabilities ==
Bataan enables the Navy and Marine Corps team to seamlessly transition from the sea to a land battle, as the lead ship and centerpiece of an Amphibious Ready Group (ARG). The ship is capable of amphibious assault, advance force, and special purpose operations, as well as evacuation and humanitarian assistance.

== History ==
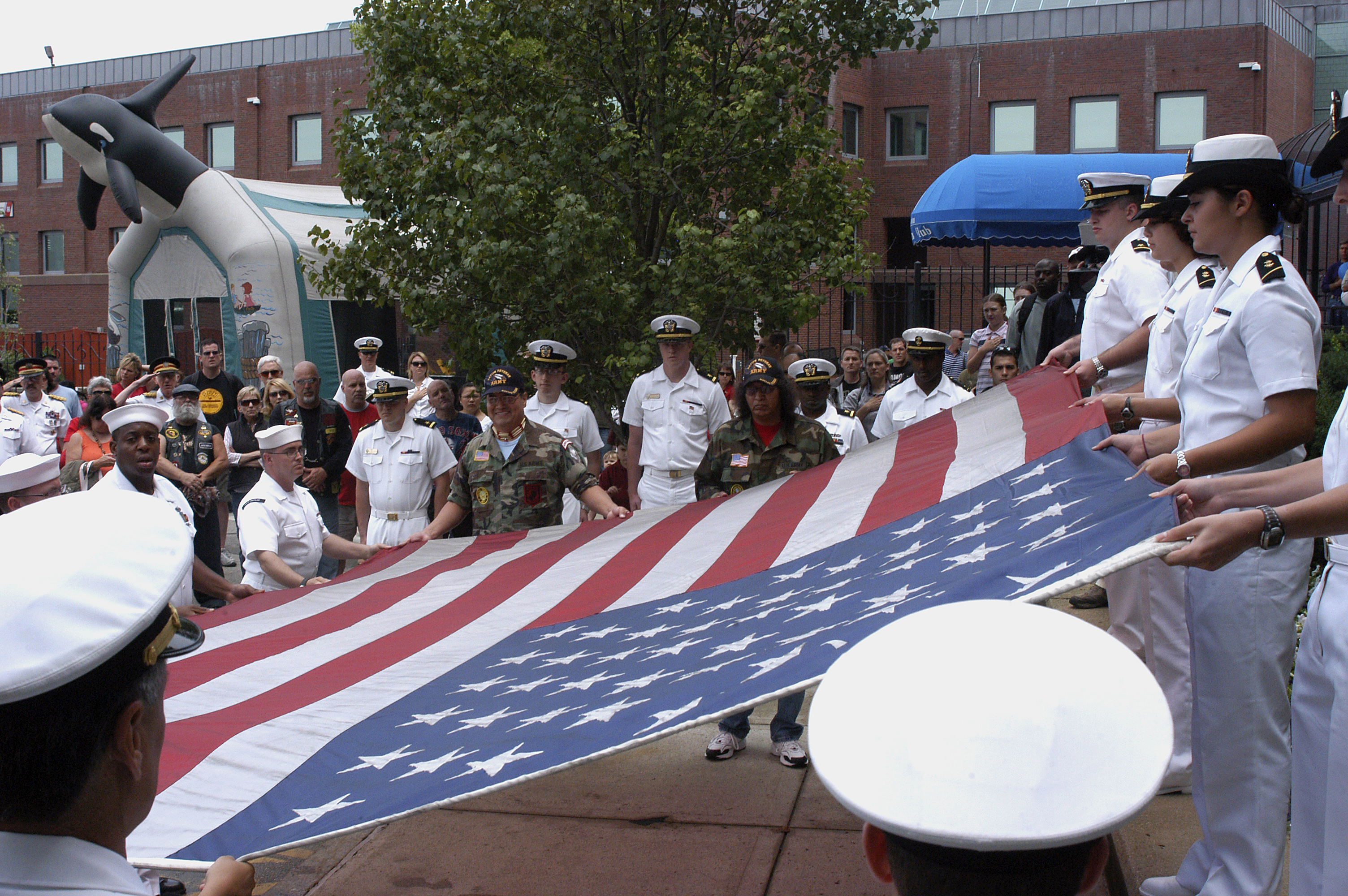
Sailors assigned to Bataan assist in the unfolding of a flag that was flying over the World Trade Center on 11 September 2001, during a ceremony in 2008

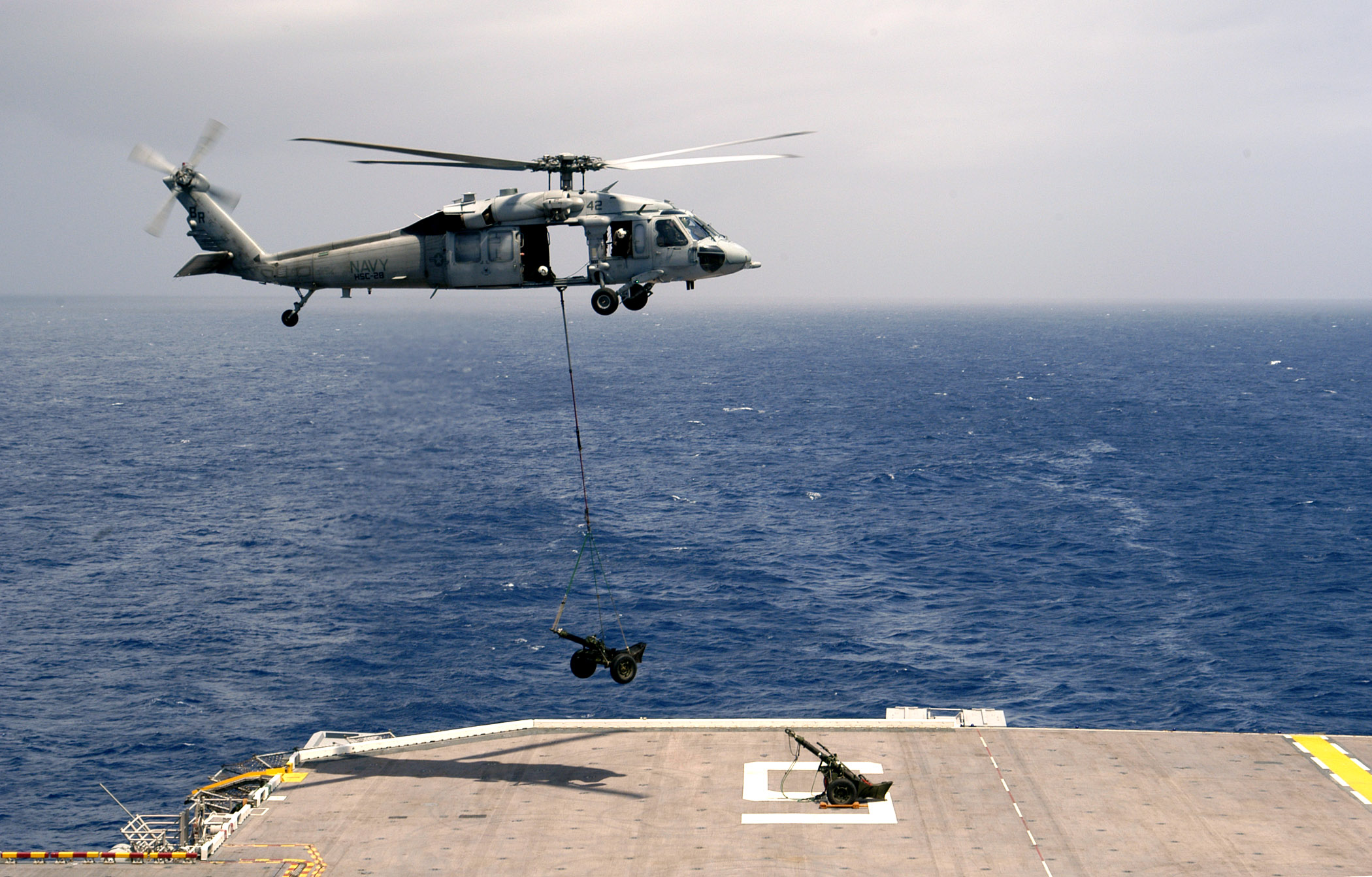
USMC M327 mortar air lifted onto Bataan's deck by MH-60S Seahawk on 7 June 2006

=== 2001–2003: Operation Enduring Freedom ===
The USS Bataan ARG were the first ships to respond after the 11 September 2001 attacks. The ship was home on leave during the attack, and was scheduled to be deployed on 19 September 2001. The crew was called back early from leave and the ship headed for New York Harbor, as she is capable of acting as a 600-bed hospital ship with surgical suites on board. Once it was determined there were few survivors from the attack, Bataan returned to Norfolk, Virginia. The ship's crew prepared and onloaded the 26th Marine Expeditionary Unit with gear both pierside in Norfolk, and off the coast of North Carolina from Marine Corps Air Station Cherry Point and Camp Lejeune. The Bataan ARG delivered more than 2,500 Marines and their equipment to Pakistan, with the aim to enter Afghanistan, thus opening Operation Enduring Freedom. The Bataan ARG stayed on station off the coast of Pakistan and completed the longest sustained amphibious assault in U.S. history, with sailors not touching ground for over four months as they marched nearly 700 nautical miles into Afghanistan.

=== 2003–2007: Iraq War ===
Bataan was one of many vessels in the Middle East region at the beginning of the Iraq War on or about 20 March 2003. After delivering her attack and transport helicopters, troops, and vehicles she was employed as a "Harrier Carrier" with primary duties supporting two Marine AV-8B Harrier II squadrons along with USS Bonhomme Richard. She launched air strikes and close air support missions. She has made two deployments to the region since the invasion. For her third deployment, she joined the Fifth Fleet in the Gulf region, transiting the Suez Canal into the Red Sea on 30 January 2007.

=== 2005: Hurricane Katrina ===
Bataan provided relief to the victims of category-4 Hurricane Katrina. She was positioned near New Orleans prior to Katrina making landfall on 29 August 2005, and began relief operations the following day. The ship's helicopters were among the first to provide damage assessment. They went on to transport over 1,600 displaced persons to safety. Bataan delivered more than 100,000 pounds (45,000 kg) of cargo and 8,000 U.S. gallons (30,000 liters) of fresh water to the area. The ship served as a base for two fly-away medical teams, consisting of 84 medical professionals, who provided emergency medical care in New Orleans.

=== 2005: Evaluation of V-22 Osprey ===
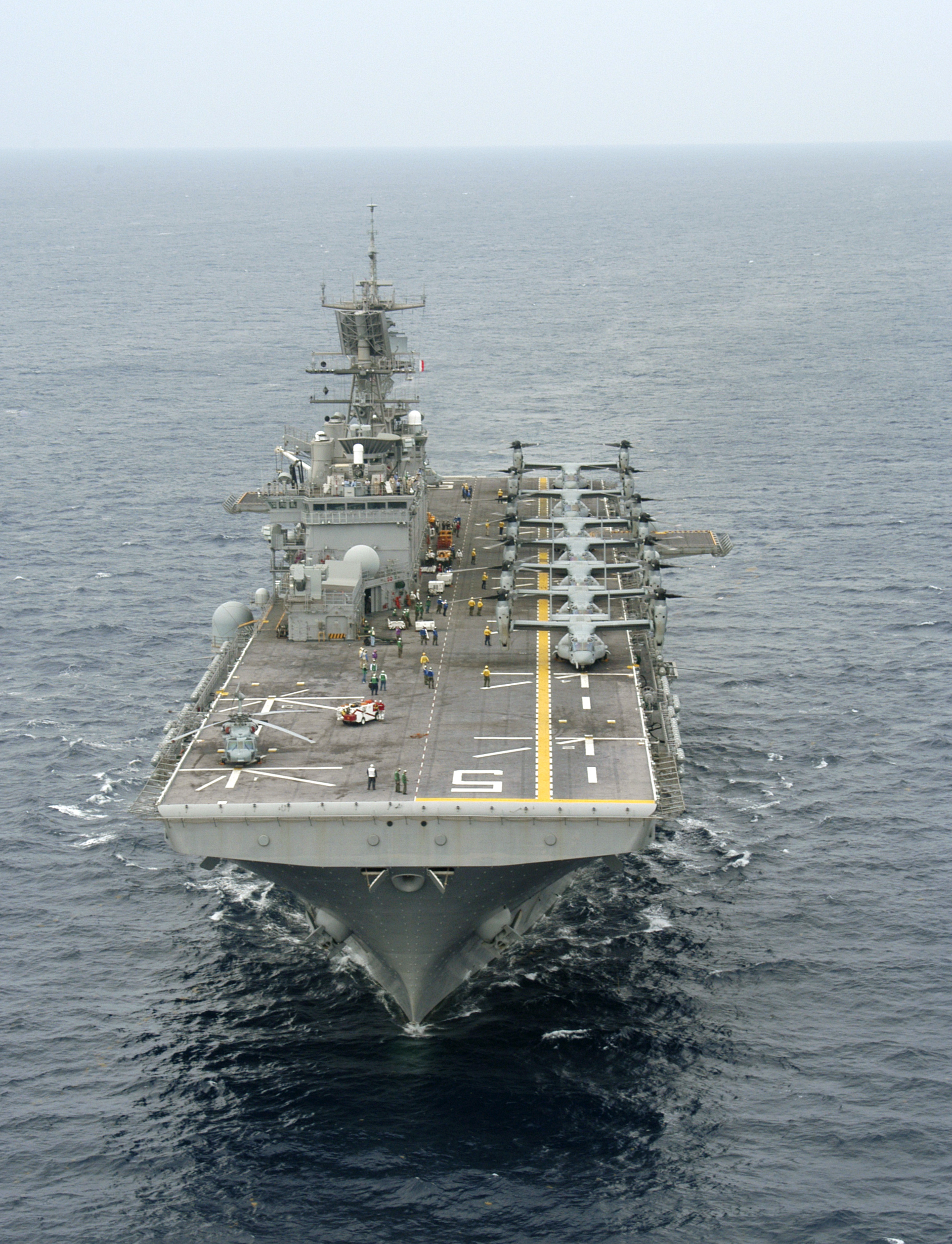
Bataan with V-22 Ospreys on board, 18 June 2005.

Bataan served as a naval testbed for the evaluation of the V-22 Osprey tiltrotor aircraft in September 2005. This work included OPEVAL II operational and live fire tests, and was accomplished with eight Ospreys. In 2009, Bataan became the first Navy ship to host an operational squadron of V-22 rotorcraft when she embarked ten Ospreys of the VMM-263.

=== 2008: Hurricane Gustav ===
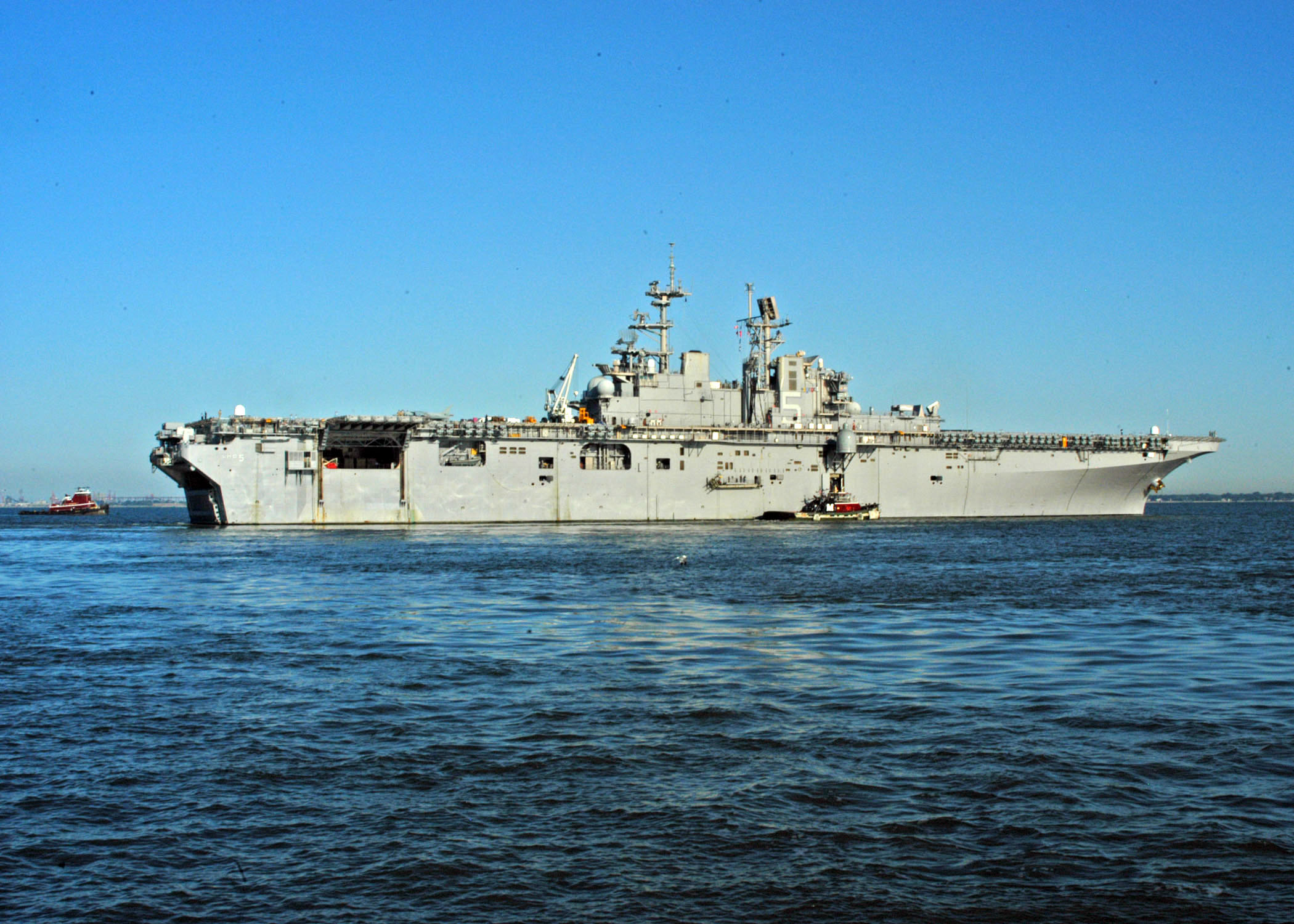
Bataan underway to participate in a hurricane exercise, 2 September 2008.

In September 2008, Bataan participated in the HURREX exercise where the U.S. Second Fleet directed tests designed to evaluate the ship's ability to respond to humanitarian assistance and disaster relief needs during the 2008 hurricane season. She was ordered to be prepared to deploy in the event that the Navy was directed to provide assistance to civilian authorities after Hurricane Gustav came ashore.

=== 2008: Use as a prison ship ===
In June 2008, the UK-based human rights organization Reprieve issued a report that listed Bataan as one of up to 17 ships they believed were used to imprison terrorism suspects. On 2 June 2008, The Guardian reported that "The US had admitted that Bataan and Peleliu were used as prison ships between December 2001 and January 2002".

=== 2010: Haiti earthquake ===
On 13 January 2010, Bataan was ordered to assist in the humanitarian relief efforts following the 7.0 magnitude 2010 Haiti earthquake. She was deployed to Grand-Goâve, and returned home 1 April 2010.

=== 2011: Libya and Italy ===
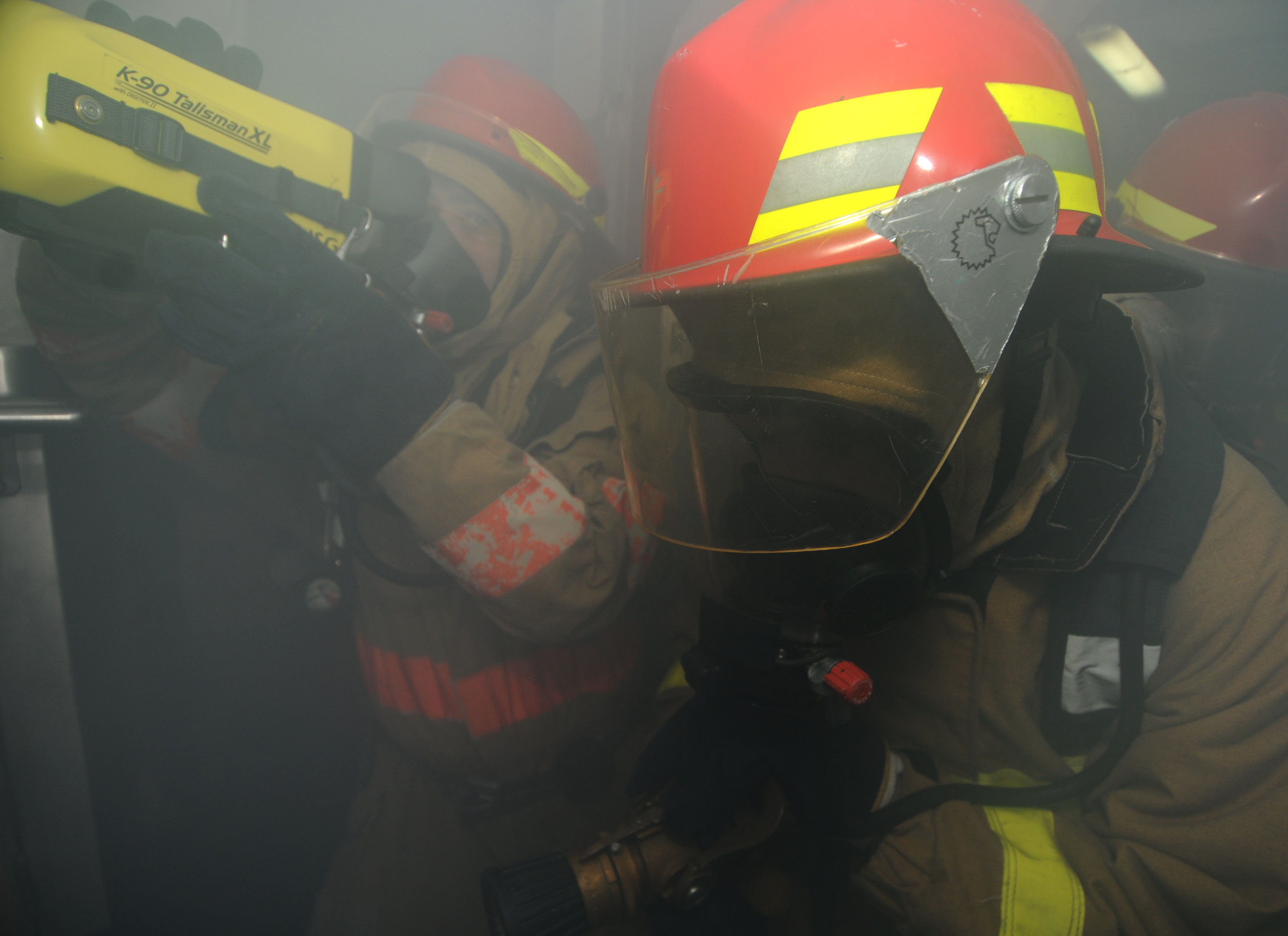
Gulf of Oman, (15 December 2011). A firefighting team enters a smoke-filled room to extinguish a mock fire during a general quarters drill aboard Bataan

On 23 March 2011, Bataan was deployed to Italy to assist in enforcing the no-fly zone over Libya.

=== 2014: Air campaign in Iraq ===
During the 2014 air campaign against the Islamic State in Iraq and Syria, AV-8B Harriers from Bataan participated in reconnaissance missions and at least one air strike, including the first use of Marine Corps ordnance against an ISIS-controlled target.

=== 2016: Mark VI patrol boat operations ===
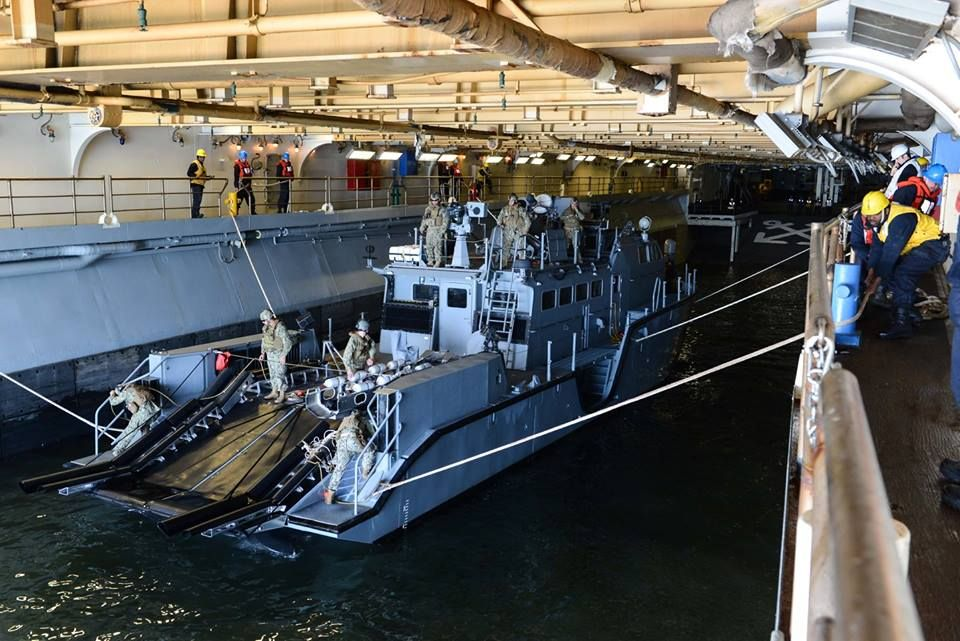
A Mark VI patrol boat docking with Bataan

In May 2016, Bataan conducted well deck operations with the Mark VI patrol boat, demonstrating the capability to launch and dock the 85 ft patrol boat with an amphibious assault ship. This was the first time the Mark VI operated out of an LHD, and the second time it operated out of a well deck overall.

=== 2020: Iran's increasing threat and tensions ===
The Bataan served as an operations center for activities in the Persian Gulf after the assassination of Iranian Major General Qasem Soleimani of the Islamic Revolutionary Guard Corps. The ship was tasked to be on standby for potential retaliation from Iran and Iranian-backed paramilitary forces such as Hezbollah or Houthis.

=== 2022 ===
On 19 January 2022, Bataan completed a 16-month maintenance at Norfolk.

During November 2022, a hybrid manufacturing technology for metals combining Meltio's wire-laser directed energy deposition head with the Haas CNC milling machine built by Phillips Corporation was installed in a U.S. Navy surface ship, becoming the first ever integration of metal additive manufacturing on this type of naval platform.

=== 2023: The Red Sea Crisis ===
On 10 July 2023, Bataan ARG, comprising Bataan, USS Carter Hall (LSD-50), and USS Mesa Verde (LPD-19), departed Norfolk for a scheduled deployment. On 11 October 2023, while operating in the Persian Gulf Bataan, with the 26th Marine Expeditionary Unit (Special Operations Capable), along with Carter Hall, were ordered to leave exercises off Kuwait to potentially sail to the Mediterranean due to the ongoing Gaza war. The Bataan and Carter Hall operated in the Red Sea from October to December 2023 before transiting the Suez Canal north to the eastern Mediterranean Sea.

=== 2024 ===
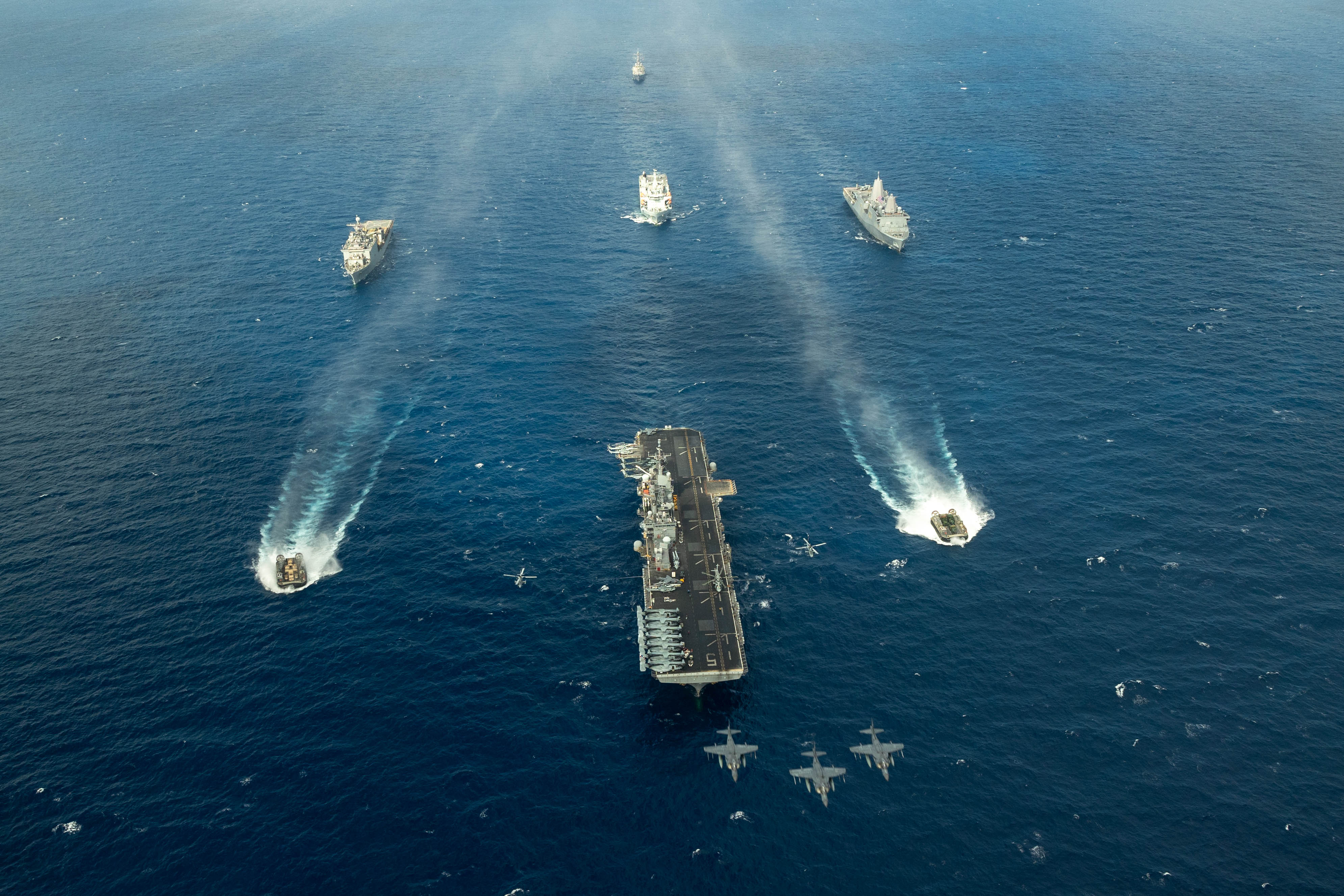
The Bataan Amphibious Ready Group (ships included are USS Carter Hall, USS Arleigh Burke, and USS Mesa Verde) conducts a PASSEX with RFA Argus, 25 February 2024.

In January 2024 during the Red Sea crisis one of the Harriers was modified for air defense; its pilot Captain Ehrhart is reported to have shot down seven Houthi suicide attack drones. In May 2024 Bataan, was part of Fleet Week at Port Miami in Florida and also Fleet Week at the Manhattan Cruise Terminal in New York.

=== 2025–2026 ===
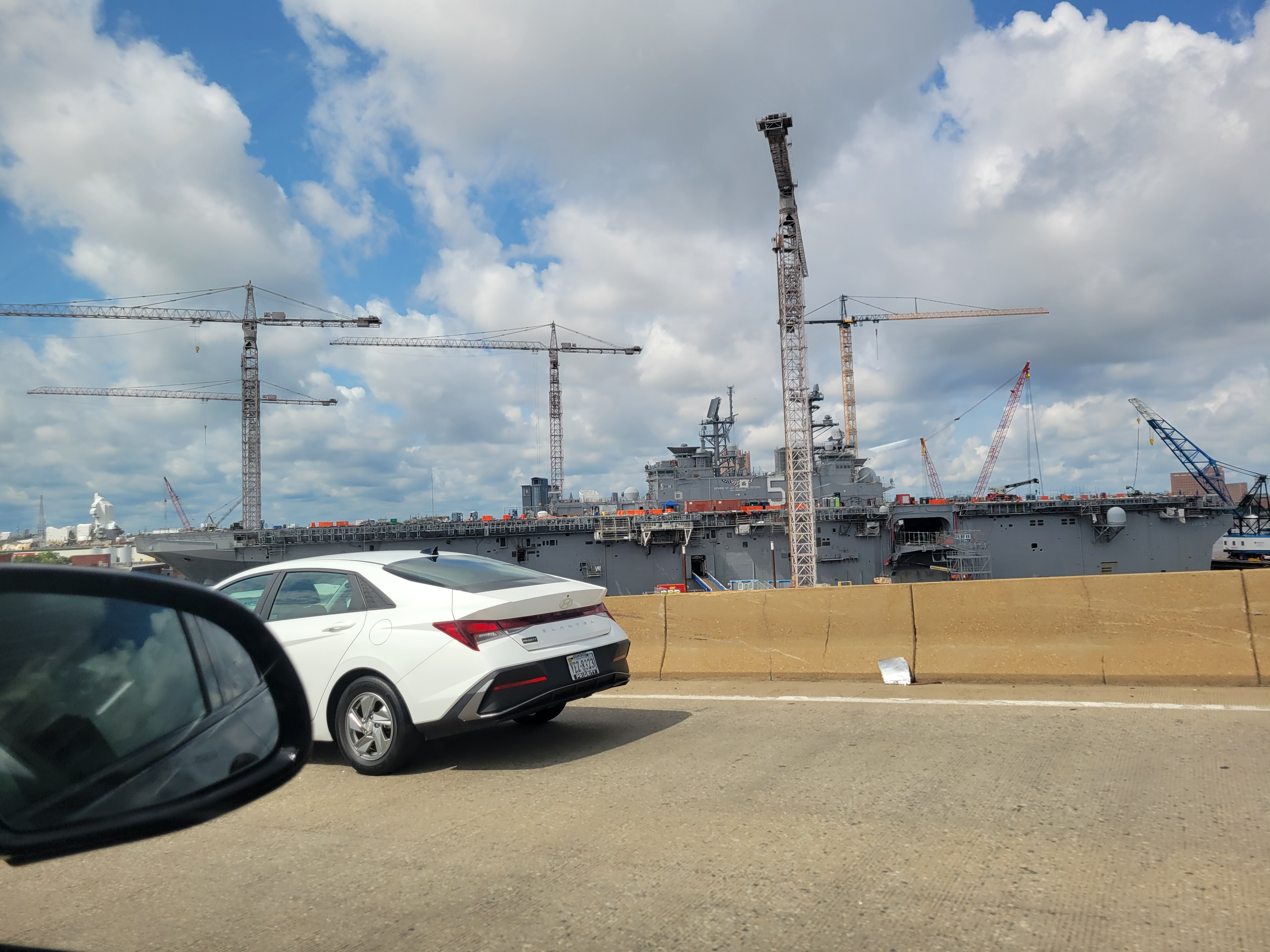
USS Bataan sitting in dry dock ready to be released soon from dry dock, August 22nd, 2026

As of late March 2026, Bataan is currently receiving heavy maintenance. A fire broke out on the ship in maintenance in December 2025; the fire was subsequently extinguished with 2 reported injuries. Bataan is set to re-enter service in mid-2026.

== Awards ==
- Combat Action Ribbon (2023–2024)
- Navy Unit Commendation – (October 2023 – May 2024)
- National Defense Service Medal
- Global War on Terrorism Expeditionary Medal with three service stars (2001, 2003, 2004, 2023)
- Global War on Terrorism Service Medal
- Humanitarian Service Medal with service star – (14–25 January 2010) 2010 Haiti earthquake
- Navy Sea Service Ribbon (2023–2024)
