= Tanahmerah Bay =

Coordinates: 2°25′S 140°20′E

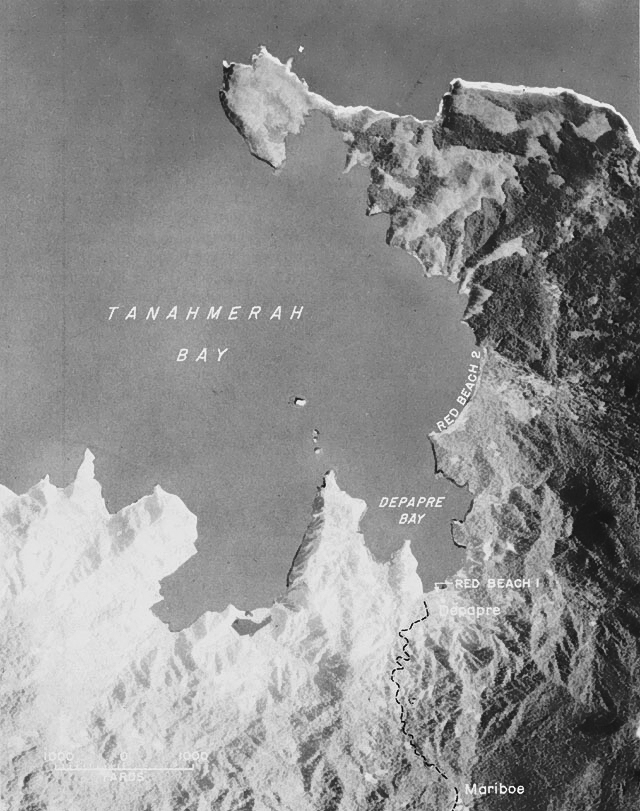
Tanahmerah Bay with landing zones Red Beach 1 & 2 (Operation Reckless, April 1944)

Tanahmerah Bay, or Tanah Merah Bay, (Indonesian: Teluk Tanahmerah, "red soil bay") is a bay on the north coast of New Guinea, in Jayapura Regency, Papua, Indonesia, about 50 km northwest of the provincial capital of Jayapura.

During World War II, the Jayapura (then Hollandia) area was a Japanese army and air force base. On 22 April 1944, two regiments of the 24th Infantry Division landed in Tanamerah Bay, as part of Operation Reckless. Subsequently, the area became an Allied base, Naval Base Hollandia, supporting further actions in the Southwest Pacific, and the invasion of the Philippines.

== See also ==
- Port of Depapre, an under-construction seaport located inside the bay
