= 9th Fleet (Imperial Japanese Navy) =

Fleet of the Imperial Japanese Navy

The IJN 9th Fleet (第九艦隊, Dai-kyū Kantai) was a fleet of the Imperial Japanese Navy established during World War II.

== History ==
Established on 15 November 1943, the IJN 9th Fleet was a headquarters unit established to direct Japanese naval operations in New Guinea. The ships and equipment of the IJN 9th Fleet were under the operational control of the Southeast Area Fleet. It provided support for Japanese troops on the northern coast of New Guinea, and also administered the No.2 and No.7 Base units of land forces assigned to occupy northern New Guinea. By the time the IJN 9th Fleet had been established, much of New Guinea had already been retaken by American forces under Operation Cartwheel, and the IJN 9th Fleet could do little more than provide defensive support and limited supplies.

In March 1944, survivors of the two Base Units merged into the No.27 Special Base unit, at which time the IJN 9th Fleet came under the operational control of the Southwest Area Fleet. It was disbanded on 10 July 1944.

== Commanders of the IJN 9th Fleet ==
Commander in chief

	Rank	Name	
1	Vice-Admiral	Yoshikazu Endo	15 Nov 1943 – 10 Jul 1944

Chief of staff

	Rank	Name	
1	Rear-Admiral	Masaki Ogata	15 Nov 1943 – 3 May 1944
