= USS Carter Hall (LSD-3) =

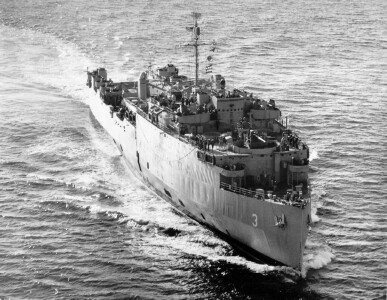
- USS Carter Hall (LSD-3)

History

United States
- Name: Carter Hall
- Namesake: Carter Hall in Virginia
- Builder: Moore Dry Dock Company
- Launched: 4 March 1943
- Commissioned: 18 September 1943
- Decommissioned: 12 February 1947
- Recommissioned: 26 January 1951
- Decommissioned: 31 October 1969
- Stricken: 31 October 1969
- Fate: Sold for scrap, 28 August 1970

General characteristics
- Class & type: Ashland-class dock landing ship
- Displacement: 7,930 tons (loaded), 4,032 tons (light draft)
- Length: 457 ft 9 in (139.52 m) overall
- Beam: 72 ft 2 in (22.00 m)
- Draft: 8 ft 2 1/2 in (2.502 m) fwd, 10 ft 0 1/2 in (3.061 m) aft (light); 15 ft 5 1/2 in (4.712 m) fwd, 16 ft 2 in (4.93 m) aft (loaded)
- Propulsion: 2 Babcock & Wilcox boilers, 2 Skinner Uniflow Reciprocating Steam Engines, 2 propeller shafts – each shaft 3,700 hp, at 240 rpm total shaft horse power 7,400, 2 11 ft 9 in diameter, 9 ft 9 in pitch propellers
- Speed: 17 knots (31 km/h)
- Range: 8,000 nmi. at 15 knots; (15,000 km at 28 km/h)
- Boats & landing craft carried: 3 × LCT (Mk V or VI); each w/ 5 medium tanks or; 2 × LCT (Mk III or IV); each w/ 12 medium tanks or; 14 × LCM (Mk III); each w/ 1 medium tank; or 1,500 long tons cargo or; 47 × DUKW or; 41 × LVT or; Any combination of landing vehicles and landing craft up to capacity
- Capacity: 22 officers, 218 men
- Complement: 23 officers, 267 men
- Armament: 1 × 5 in / 38 cal. DP gun; 2 × 40 mm quad AA guns; 2 × 40 mm twin AA guns; 16 × 20 mm AA guns
- Aircraft carried: modified 1952 to accommodate helicopters on an added portable deck

USS Carter Hall (LSD-3) was an Ashland-class dock landing ship in the United States Navy, named in honor of Carter Hall, the Millwood, Virginia estate of Lt. Col. Nathaniel Burwell (1750–1814).

Carter Hall was launched on 4 March 1943 by Moore Dry Dock Company, Oakland, California, sponsored by Mrs. T. Wilson; and commissioned on 18 September 1943.

== Operational history ==
=== World War II ===
Carter Hall sailed from San Francisco 12 October 1943 with cargo and passengers for Brisbane, Australia. She arrived at her next port, Milne Bay, New Guinea, on 26 November to act as receiving ship, tender, and supply ship for small craft there and at Buna until 10 May 1944. During this period, she took part in the invasion landings at Cape Merkus, Arawe, New Britain on 15 December 1943, where valuable experience in the use of newly developed landing craft was gained. Upon the invasion of Aitape and Tanahmerah Bay late in April, Carter Hall once again launched laden landing craft, and stood by the invaded beaches to service small craft, remaining in the area until 2 May 1944.

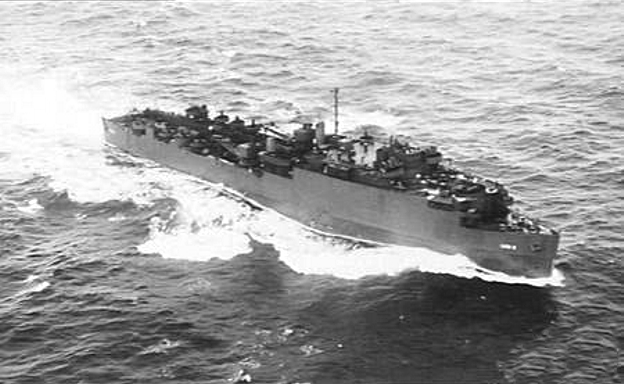
Carter Hall underway in the Coral Sea, 25 November 1943.

Carter Hall arrived at Guadalcanal on 12 May 1944 for amphibious training, then sailed to Kwajalein to stand by in case she should be needed during the invasion of Saipan. Her services not required for that assault, she sailed on to Eniwetok and final preparations for the smashing return to Guam, where she arrived 21 July, the day of the initial assault. She remained off the island, supporting the operation through servicing small craft, until 26 July. The dock landing ship returned to Hollandia on 29 August, and from 11 September to 1 October supported the operations at Morotai.

Carter Hall sailed from Hollandia on 12 October 1944 with the Palo Attack Group of the Northern Attack Force, bound for the landings on Red Beach near Tacloban, San Pedro Bay, Philippines on 20 October. Working efficiently in the apparent chaos that concealed the intricate, smoothly meshed landing plans, Carter Hall's men carried out their key role both in landing their craft and in caring for small craft through 24 October, when she made her retirement as the Battle of Leyte Gulf raged nearby. Her participation in the Leyte operation continued as she carried cargo from New Guinea on a series of runs until 17 November. From then until 30 December, she was stationed in San Pedro Bay as tender and supply ship for landing craft.

Overhauled at Oakland, California, between 31 January and 4 April 1945, Carter Hall returned to Subic Bay on 1 May to transport small craft, and to take part in the invasions at Brunei Bay, 10 to 16 June, and Balikpapan, 1 to 4 July. She remained at Leyte drydocking small craft until 6 September, when she sailed for Jinsen, Korea, carrying LCMs and picket boats for use in the occupation of Korea.

Occupation duty at Shanghai and Sasebo continued until 9 April 1946, when Carter Hall cleared for San Francisco. She was decommissioned and placed in reserve at San Diego 12 February 1947.

=== 1951–1956 ===
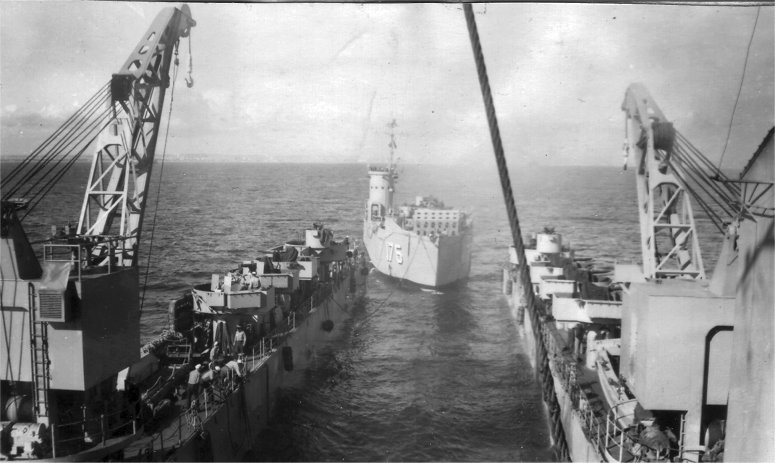
LSM-175 about to enter the well of Carter Hall in San Diego Bay, Spring 1951.

Recommissioned 26 January 1951 for duty in the Atlantic Fleet, Carter Hall arrived at her home port, Norfolk, Virginia, on 11 June 1951. Until 7 January 1955, she operated on training, salvage, and fleet exercises, as well as a tour with the 6th Fleet in the Mediterranean from January through May 1953. Prior to the Mediterranean cruise, she operated in support of construction of the Defensive Early Warning system off Hebron, Labradore and briefly visited Greenland, crossing the Arctic Circle at 1431, latitude 66'30"N and in longitude 52'03"W on 22 July 1952.

Returning to the Pacific Fleet, Carter Hall arrived at San Diego on 31 January 1955. Along with type training and fleet exercises, she had tours of duty in the western Pacific in 1955, 1958, 1959, and 1960, and took part in Arctic supply operations in summer 1956.

=== Fate ===
Carter Hall was decommissioned and struck from the Naval Vessel Register on 31 October 1969 and sold to N. W. Kennedy, Vancouver, British Columbia, 28 August 1970, for scrapping.

== USS Carter Hall awards, citations & campaign ribbons ==
Carter Hall received six battle stars for World War II service.

- Top Row: China Service Medal (extended) — American Campaign Medal
- Second Row: Asiatic-Pacific Campaign Medal (6) — World War II Victory Medal — Navy Occupation Service Medal (with Asia clasp)
- Third Row: National Defense Service Medal (2) — Armed Forces Expeditionary Medal (1-Cuba, 4-Vietnam) — Vietnam Service Medal (5)
- Fourth Row: Republic of Vietnam Gallantry Cross Unit Citation (14) – Philippines Liberation Medal (1) — Republic of Vietnam Campaign Medal
- Fifth Row: Individual Combat Action Ribbon (crewmembers aboard 13 December 1966)
