= USS Dwight D. Eisenhower =

US Navy Nimitz-class aircraft carrier

USS Dwight D. Eisenhower(CVN-69)
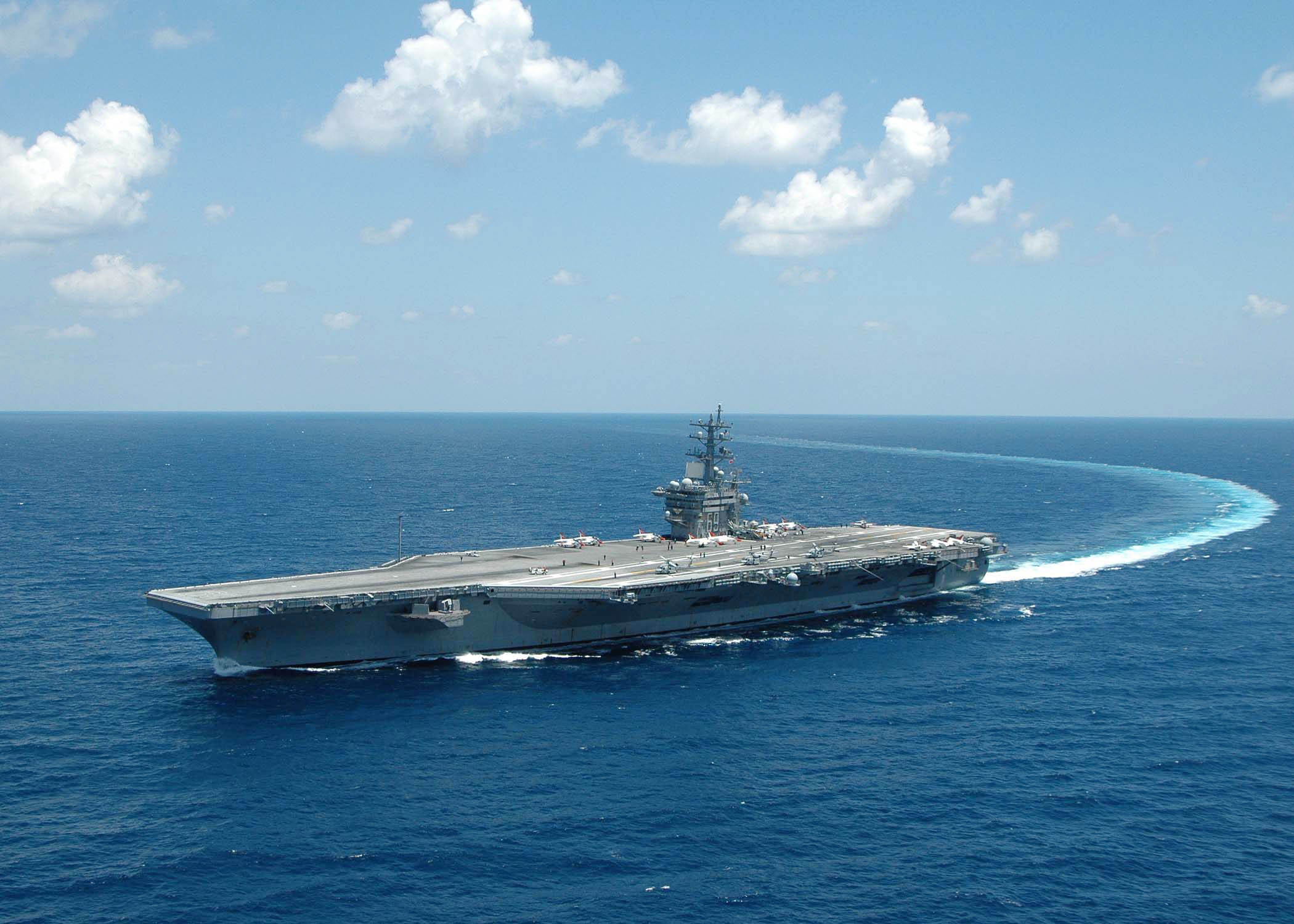
- USS Dwight D. Eisenhower (CVN-69)

History

United States
- Name: Dwight D. Eisenhower
- Namesake: Dwight D. Eisenhower
- Awarded: 29 June 1970
- Builder: Newport News Shipbuilding
- Cost: $679 million ($5.6 billion in 2025 dollars)
- Laid down: 15 August 1970
- Launched: 11 October 1975
- Sponsored by: Mamie Doud-Eisenhower
- Christened: 11 October 1975
- Acquired: 12 September 1977
- Commissioned: 18 October 1977
- Renamed: from Eisenhower, 25 May 1970
- Reclassified: CVN-69, 30 June 1975
- Home port: Norfolk, Virginia
- Identification: MMSI number: 368962000; Callsign: NIKE; Hull number: CVN-69
- Motto: Greater Each Day
- Nickname(s): Mighty Ike; Ike
- Status: in active service
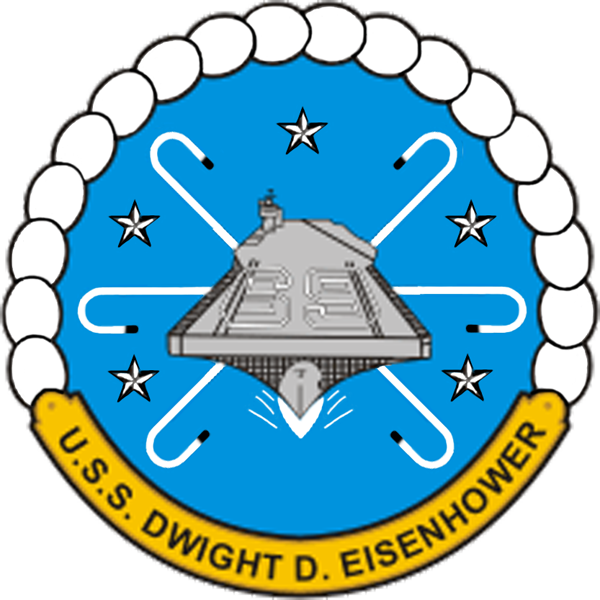
- Badge

General characteristics
- Class & type: Nimitz-class aircraft carrier
- Displacement: 101,600 long tons (113,800 short tons)
- Length: Overall: 1,092 ft (332.8 m); Waterline: 1,040 ft (317.0 m)
- Beam: Overall: 252 ft (76.8 m); Waterline: 134 ft (40.8 m)
- Height: 244 feet (74 m)
- Draft: Maximum navigational: 37 ft (11.3 m); Limit: 41 ft (12.5 m)
- Propulsion: 2 × Westinghouse A4W nuclear reactors (HEU 93.5%); 4 × steam turbines; 4 × shafts; 260,000 shp (190 MW)
- Speed: 30 knots (56 km/h; 35 mph)+
- Range: Unlimited distance; 20–25 years
- Complement: Ship's company: 3,532; Air wing: 2,480
- Sensors & processing systems: AN/SPS-48E 3-D air search radar; AN/SPS-49(V)5 2-D air search radar; AN/SPQ-9B target acquisition radar; AN/SPN-46 air traffic control radars; AN/SPN-43C air traffic control radar; AN/SPN-41 landing aid radars; 4 × Mk 91 NSSM guidance systems; 4 × Mk 95 radars
- Electronic warfare & decoys: AN/SLQ-32A(V)4 countermeasures suite; SLQ-25A Nixie torpedo countermeasures
- Armament: 2 × RIM-7 Sea Sparrow Missile launchers; 2 × RIM-116 Rolling Airframe Missile launchers; 3 or 4 × Phalanx CIWS 20 mm cannons
- Aircraft carried: 90 fixed wing and helicopters

USS Dwight D. Eisenhower (CVN-69) is a nuclear-powered aircraft carrier currently in service with the United States Navy. Commissioned in 1977, the ship is the second of ten Nimitz-class aircraft carriers currently in service, and is the first ship named after the 34th President of the United States and General of the Army, Dwight D. Eisenhower. The vessel was initially named simply as USS Eisenhower, much like the lead ship of the class, Nimitz, but the name was changed to its present form on 25 May 1970. The carrier, like all others of her class, was constructed at Newport News Shipbuilding Company in Virginia, with the same design as the lead ship, although the ship has been overhauled twice to bring her up to the standards of those constructed more recently.

Since commissioning, Dwight D. Eisenhower has participated in deployments including the Gulf War in the 1990s, and more recently in support of U.S. military operations in Iraq, Afghanistan and Yemen. The carrier currently serves as the flagship of Carrier Strike Group 2.

== Design and construction ==
On 29 June 1970, Newport News Shipbuilding (then Northrop Grumman Newport News) of Newport News, Virginia, was awarded the contract for construction. On 30 June 1975, her designation was changed from CVAN-69 to CVN-69. She was laid down as hull number 599 on 15 August 1970 at Newport News shipyard at a cost of $679 million ($5.6 billion in 2025 dollars), launched 11 October 1975 after christening by Mamie Doud Eisenhower, Dwight Eisenhower's widow, and commissioned 18 October 1977, Captain William E. Ramsey in command. On commissioning, she replaced the aging World War II–era carrier USS Franklin D. Roosevelt in the fleet.

== Service history ==
=== 1970s ===
Dwight D. Eisenhower was initially assigned to the United States Atlantic Fleet, and, after receiving over a year of training, the ship was visited by President Jimmy Carter with his wife Rosalynn Carter, Defense Secretary Harold Brown and National Security Advisor Zbigniew Brzeziński. In January 1979, she sailed for her first deployment to the Mediterranean Sea. During this deployment, while off the coast of Israel, Israeli Prime Minister Menachem Begin visited Dwight D. Eisenhower, The carrier returned to Norfolk Naval Station in July of the same year.

=== 1980s ===
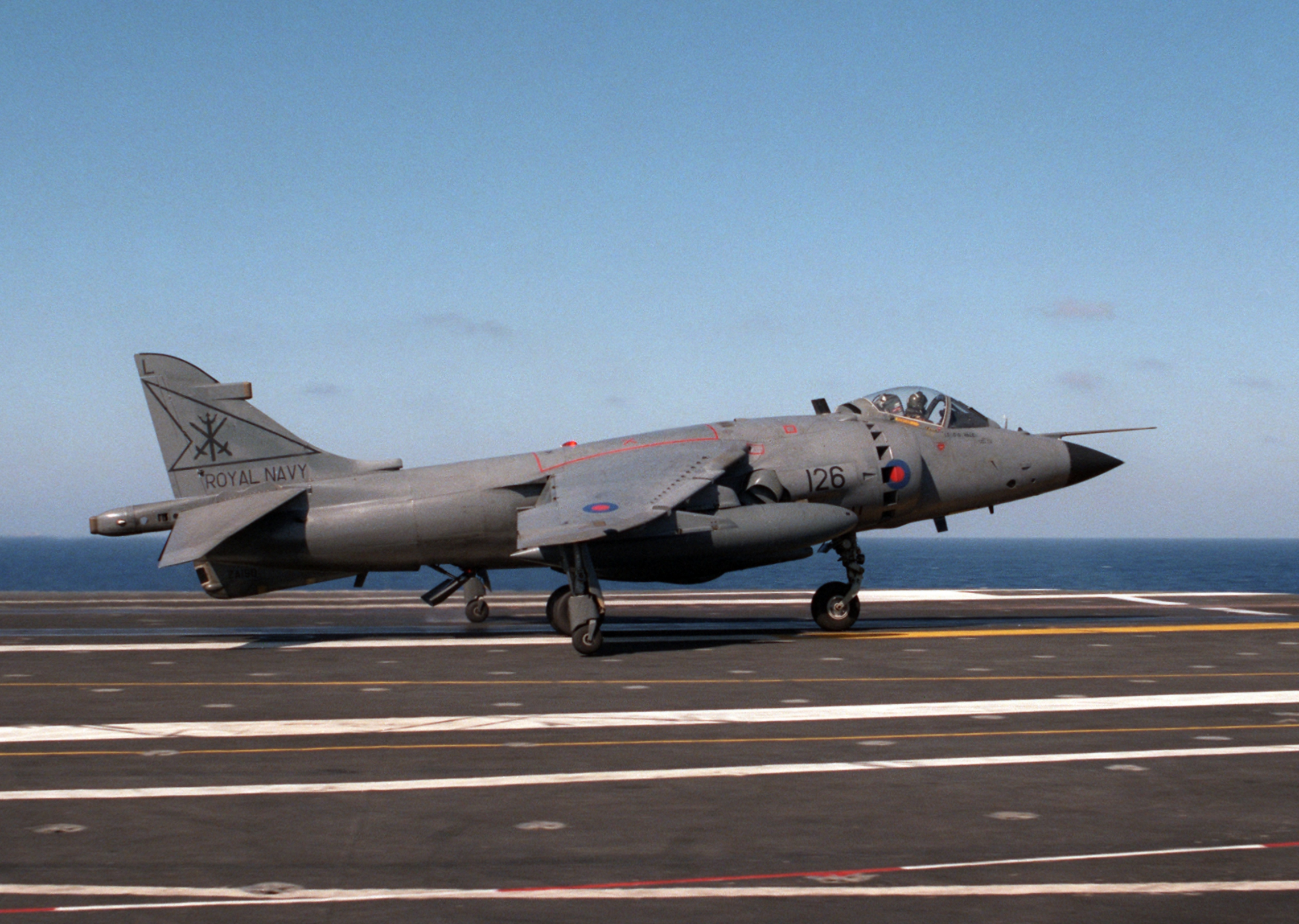
A Sea Harrier of the Fleet Air Arm takes off from the deck of Dwight D. Eisenhower in 1984.

Under the command of her second Commanding Officer, Captain James H. Mauldin, her second deployment occurred in 1980, when she was dispatched by President Carter to the Indian Ocean, in response to the Iran hostage crisis. She relieved sister-carrier Nimitz three days after the Iranian hostage rescue attempt. To help maintain morale, Captain Mauldin allowed the men aboard to participate in "Flight Deck Olympics". The Navy also authorized a special ration of beer, consisting of two cans per man every continuous 93 days at sea. The two beers were well refrigerated and were handed out to each crewman during "Steel Beach" breaks. It was the first U.S. Navy's six-pack cruise since World War II. Officers were flown by helicopter to British ships for their rum rations. Ike's crew was awarded with the Navy Unit Commendation ribbon and the Navy Marine Corps Expeditionary medal in 1980 for this extended cruise. During this cruise, port visits to Kenya and Australia were cancelled due to conflicts in the region. Eventually, Ike visited Singapore after which it returned to the Indian Ocean for a total of over 320 days out at sea for 1980.

Dwight D. Eisenhower returned to the Mediterranean Sea for her third deployment, under the command of her third Captain Edward W. Clexton Jr., from 5 January to 13 July 1982. During this deployment, 11 passengers and crew were lost when Mamie, her onboard logistics aircraft, crashed near Souda Bay, Crete, on 2 April. She also participated in the 24 June evacuation of the U.S. Embassy staff from Beirut, Lebanon, as that country descended into civil war.

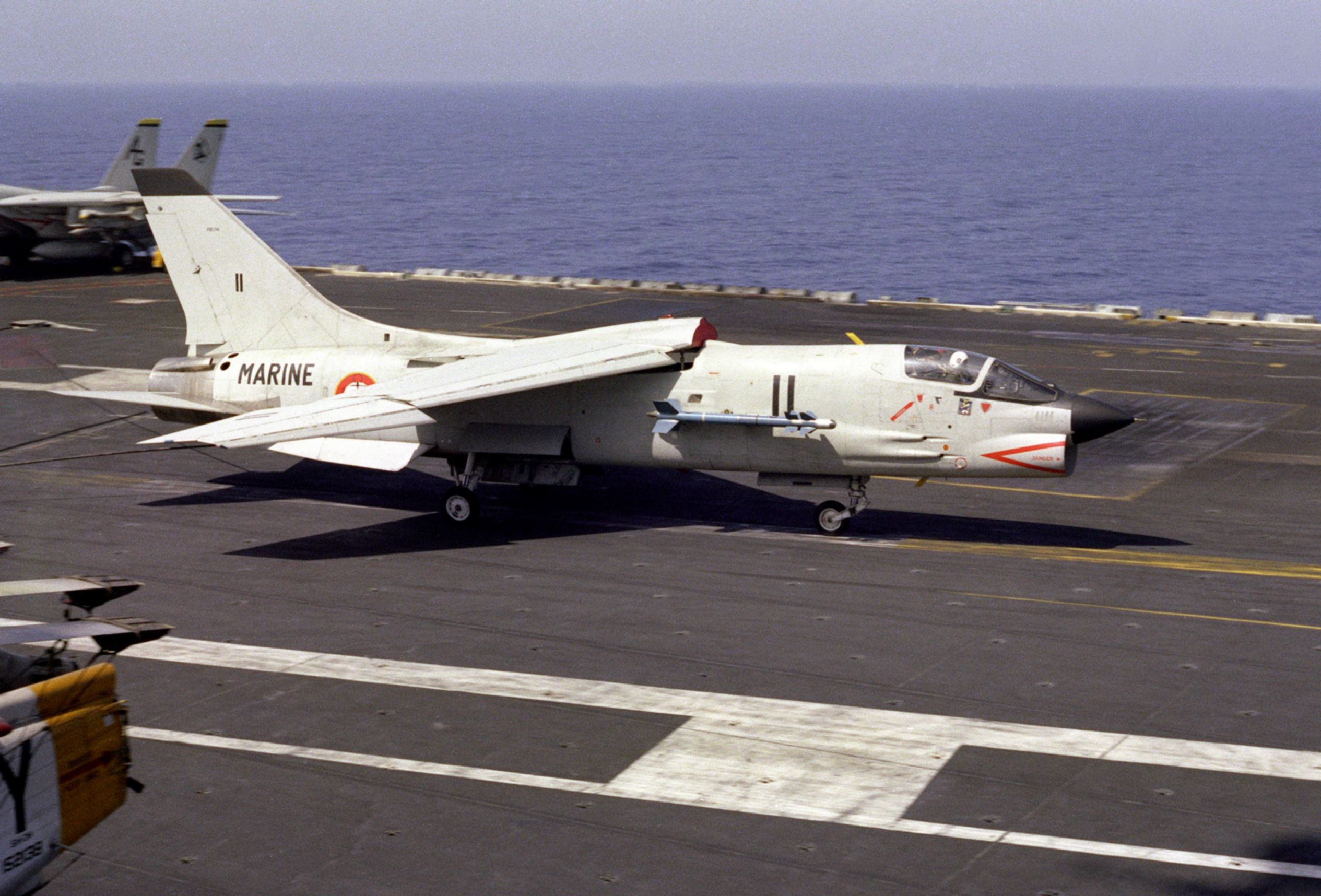
An F-8E(FN) Crusader of the Aéronavale traps aboard Dwight D. Eisenhower in 1983.

Ike embarked on her fourth deployment from 27 April to 2 December 1983. In addition to several major exercises with NATO, Egyptian and U.S. Air Force personnel and assets, she came under direct threat of attack as Libyan dictator Muammar al-Qadhafi vowed to turn the Gulf of Sidra into a "red gulf of blood" should the ship enter the zone claimed by Libya. Further tensions between Libya, Chad, Sudan, and Egypt forced Ike to be ordered to the disputed area. Between 2 and 5 August, the ship's Combat Air Patrol intercepted two MiG-23 Flogger and two Dassault-Breguet Mirage 5 aircraft headed toward the carrier in separate engagements. The Libyan aircraft immediately turned back toward their bases, ending both incidents. Diplomatic measures deflated the crisis days later. On 26 August, Ike sailed within sight of the embattled city of Beirut, Lebanon. The ship launched reconnaissance sorties in support of the U.S. Marines and other international peacekeepers coming under attack ashore. After 93 days at sea since her previous port visit, Ike visited Italy on 21 October. She once again had to make speed toward Beirut, just five days later on the 26th, because of suicide attacks that killed nearly 300 American and French troops on 23 October. Ike would remain on station until relieved by carriers Independence and John F. Kennedy in mid November.

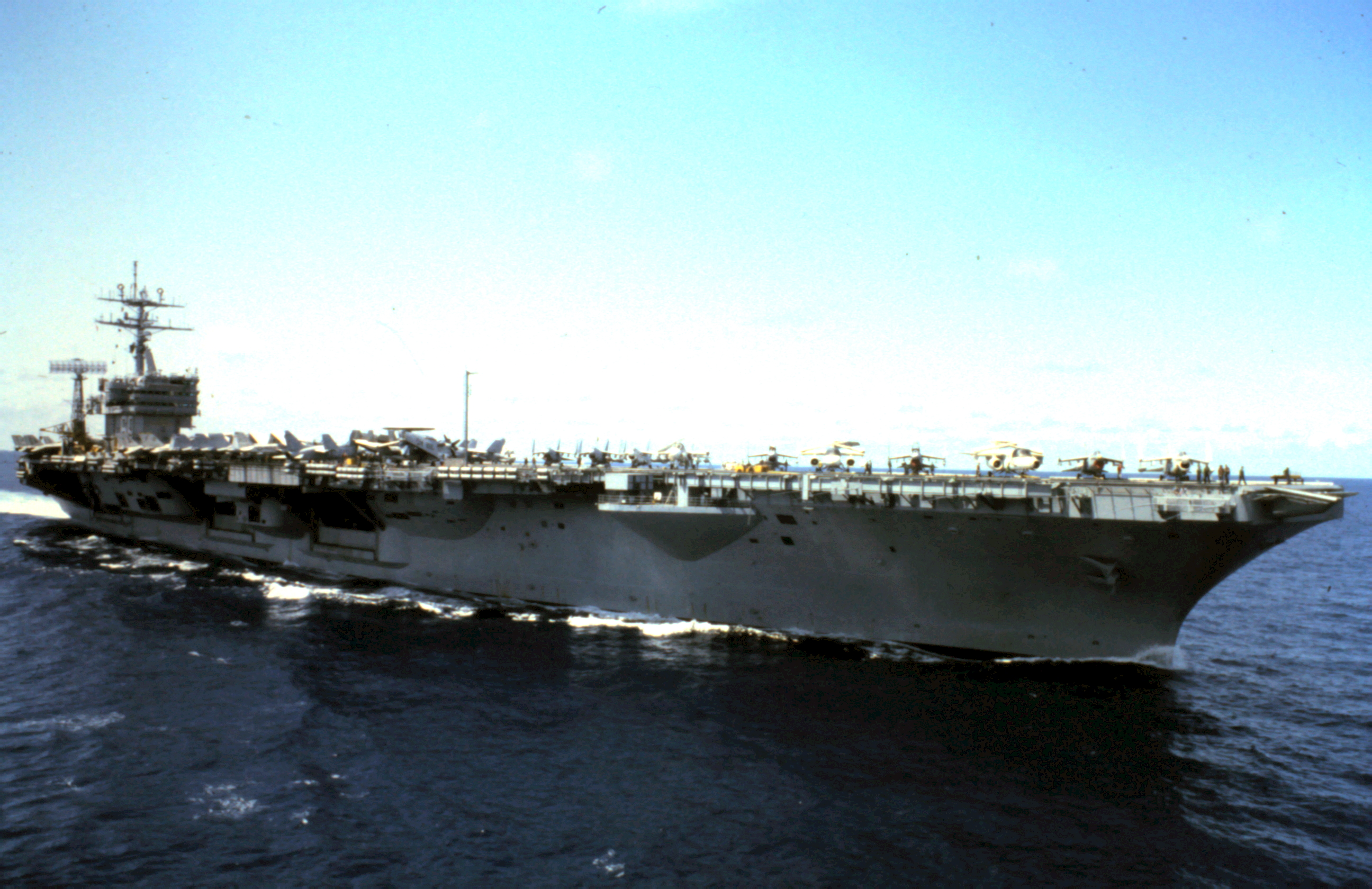
Dwight D. Eisenhower comes alongside USS Concord (AFS-5) for UNREP in the Mediterranean, 1983

In May and June 1984, for the 40th anniversary of D-Day, Ike was deployed to Normandy, France and Portsmouth, England. The port visit in England included a visit from Queen Elizabeth II. After her fifth deployment Dwight D. Eisenhower went into Newport News Shipbuilding and Drydock in October 1985 for a major overhaul. The 18-month yard period included the addition of the Close-in Weapons System (CIWS), NATO Sea Sparrow Missile System, Naval Tactical Data System, anti-submarine warfare module, communications upgrades and rehabilitation of 1,831 berths in 25 compartments. She re-entered the fleet in April 1987.

On 29 February 1988, Ike started her sixth deployment to the Mediterranean. While returning to Norfolk, on 29 August 1988, she collided with an anchored Spanish bulk carrier, the Urduliz, while entering the harbor to dock at Norfolk Naval Station when wind and currents pushed the carrier off course, but only caused minor damage to both ships. Dwight D. Eisenhower entered Norfolk Naval Shipyard (Portsmouth, Virginia) in September 1988; she returned to the fleet in April 1989.

=== 1990s ===
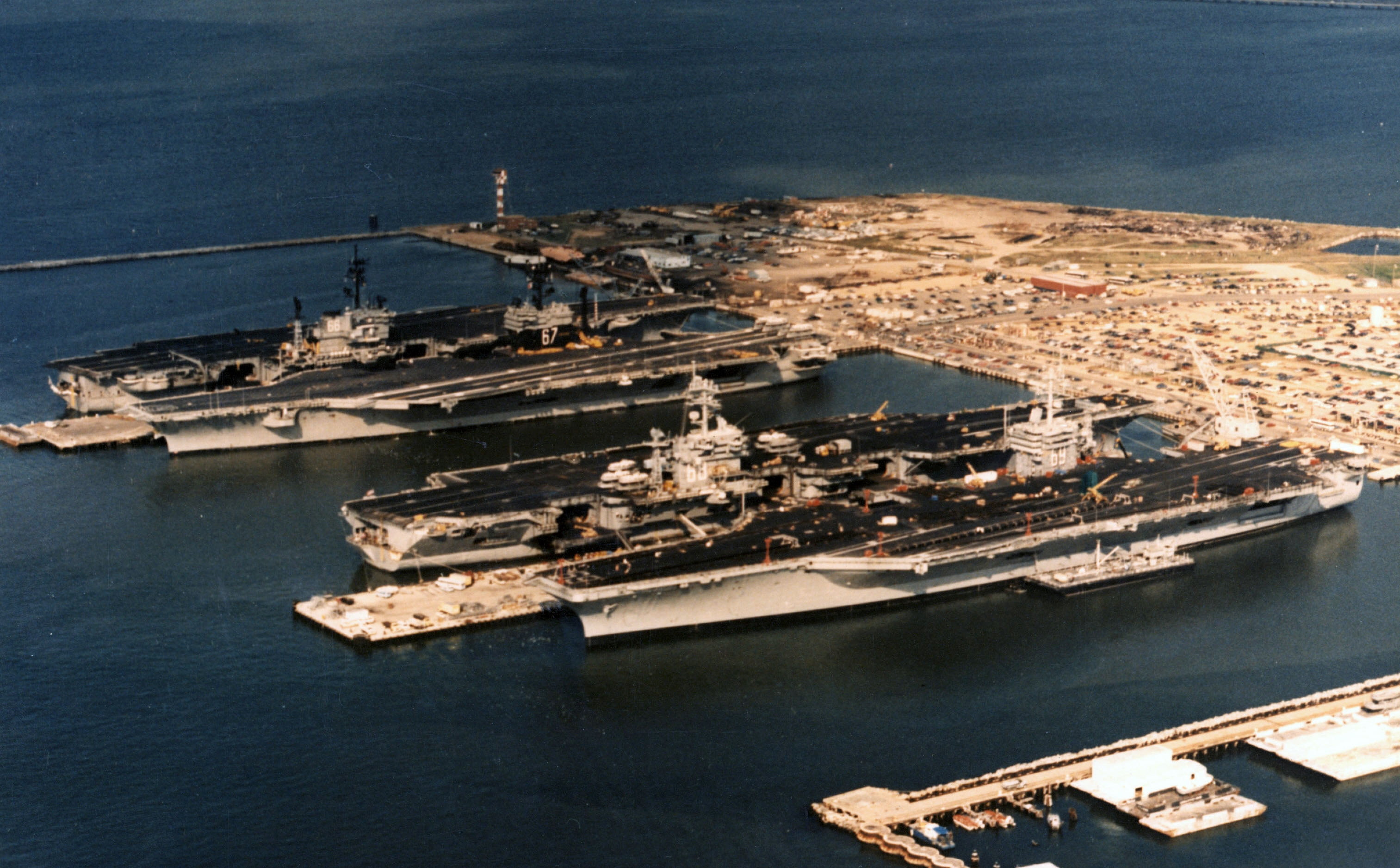
Dwight D. Eisenhower (foreground) at Norfolk in 1985 alongside Nimitz, John F. Kennedy and America.

In 1990, Dwight D. Eisenhower completed her seventh Mediterranean deployment. The deployment became a commemorative event in the worldwide "Dwight D. Eisenhower Centennial", celebrating the 100th anniversary of the late president's birth. During D-Day anniversary ceremonies off the coast of Normandy, President Eisenhower's son John Eisenhower and D-Day veterans embarked in the ship, while Carrier Air Wing Seven conducted a memorial flyover of the American cemetery at Omaha Beach in Normandy, France.

==== Gulf War ====
In response to Iraq's invasion of Kuwait, Dwight D. Eisenhower became the first carrier to conduct sustained operations in the Red Sea, and only the second nuclear-powered aircraft carrier ever to transit the Suez Canal. Ike served as a ready striking force in the event Iraq invaded Saudi Arabia, and participated in maritime interception operations in support of a United Nations embargo against Iraq.

After completion of an extensive shipyard period and work-up, the carrier deployed 26 September 1991 to the Persian Gulf to continue multi-national operations with coalition forces in support of Operation Desert Storm. Ike returned to Norfolk on 2 April 1992, and, on 12 January 1993, entered Norfolk Naval Shipyard for overhaul and conversion, returning to the fleet 12 November 1993.

==== Post–Gulf War ====
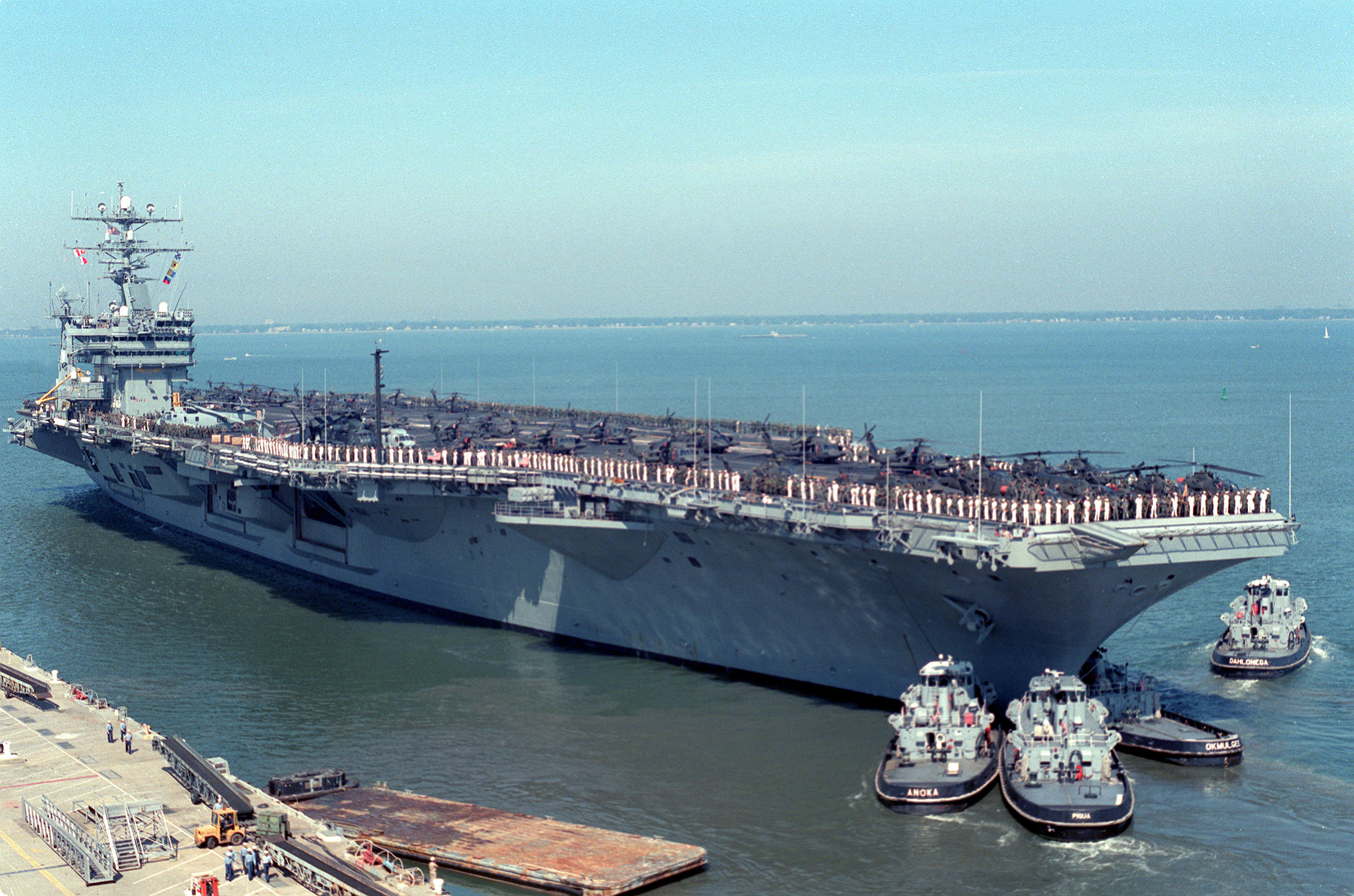
Dwight D. Eisenhower departs Norfolk for Operation Uphold Democracy in 1994.

In September 1994, Dwight D. Eisenhower and elements of the U.S. 10th Mountain Division first tested the concept of adaptive force packaging. The division's soldiers and equipment were loaded on board, and the ship's Army/Navy team headed for Port-au-Prince to lead Operation Uphold Democracy, the U.S.-led effort to restore the elected government of Haiti.

One month later, in October 1994, Dwight D. Eisenhower departed for a six-month deployment which included flying missions in support of Operation Southern Watch and Operation Deny Flight. This deployment marked the first time that women had deployed as crew members of a U.S. Navy combatant. Dwight D. Eisenhower, Carrier Air Wing Three (CVW-3), and the Commander, Cruiser-Destroyer Group 8 staff team included more than 400 women. The integration of women caused some negative headlines for the Navy. During the deployment, 15 women serving aboard had to be reassigned ashore because of pregnancy, earning the ship the nickname The Love Boat. There was also a case of a sailor who filmed himself having sex with a female.

Dwight D. Eisenhower returned to Newport News Shipbuilding on 17 July 1995 for an 18-month complex overhaul, completed on 27 January 1997. Among other upgrades, they installed a new Advanced combat direction system. The ship departed on her 10th deployment on 10 June 1998 and returned in December. In February 1999, she returned to the Norfolk Navy Shipyard for a six-month refitting and returned to the fleet in June. Upon completion in June 1999, she returned to full duty in the fleet.

In April 1995, the long-running game show Wheel of Fortune recorded two weeks of shows from the hangar bay of the Eisenhower.

=== 2000s ===
Deploying in February 2000 and returning that August on the "Millennium Cruise", for the first time Ike's embarked aircraft dropped ordnance in combat while enforcing Operation Southern Watch's No-Fly Zone over Iraq.

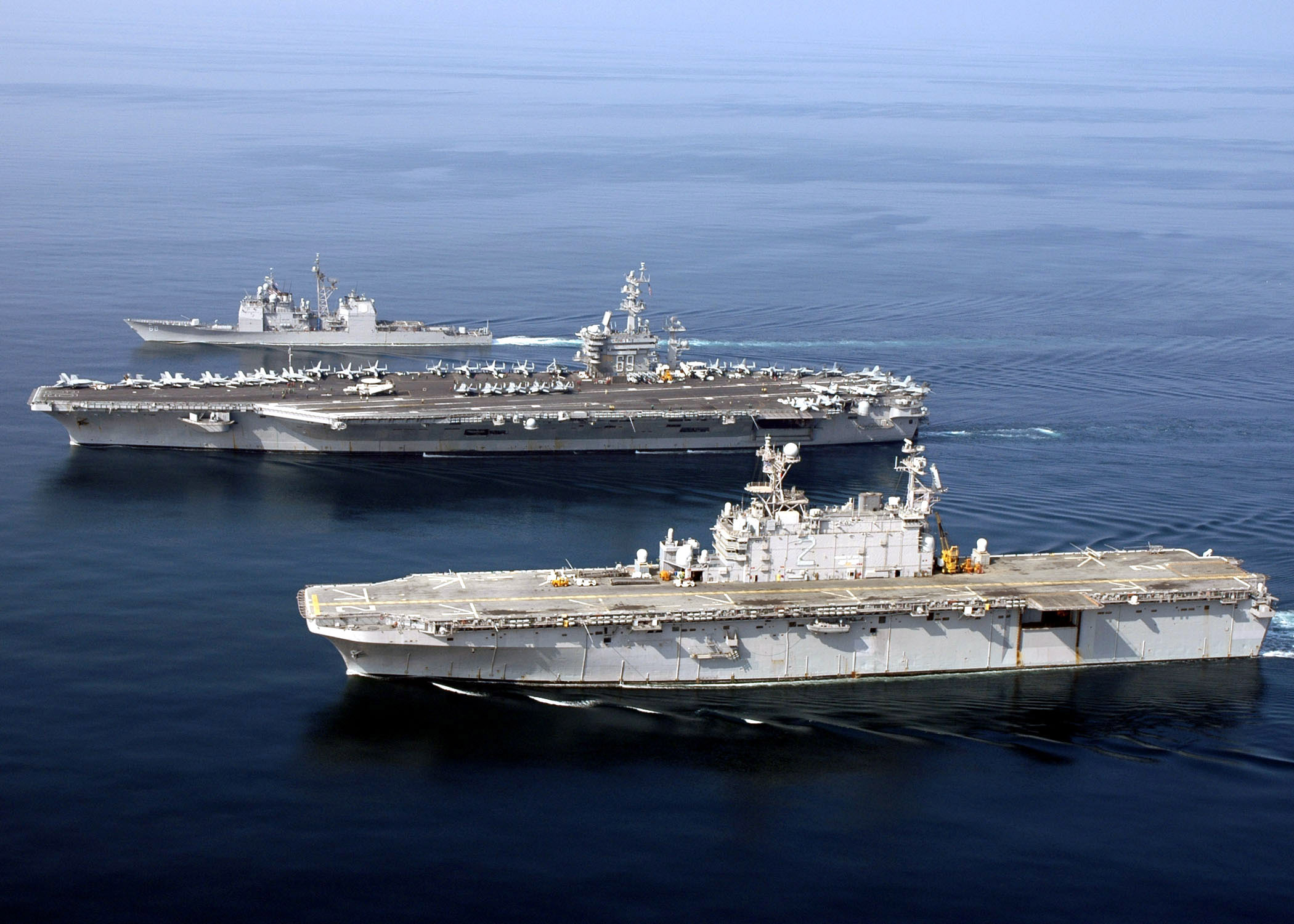
Dwight D. Eisenhower (center) sails in formation with Saipan and Anzio, 20 November 2006.

On 3 October 2006 with Carrier Air Wing Seven (CVW-7), Dwight D. Eisenhower returned to sea as flagship of Rear Admiral Allen G. Myers, commanding Carrier Strike Group Eight (CSG-8), which included guided-missile cruiser Anzio, guided-missile destroyers Ramage and Mason, and fast-attack submarine Newport News. She visited Naples, Italy, and then Limassol, Cyprus, for three days in October 2006 before departing to the east. She entered the Persian Gulf in December 2006. On 8 January 2007, a U.S. AC-130 gunship based out of Djibouti was dispatched to target Al-Qaeda operatives located in Somalia. Dwight D. Eisenhower was deployed in the Indian Ocean to provide air cover for the operation and, if needed, to evacuate downed airmen and other casualties. She joined other U.S. and allied vessels from Combined Task Force 150 (CTF-150), based out of Bahrain. A U.S. spokesperson did not say which particular ships comprised the cordon, but the task force included vessels from Canada, France, Germany, Pakistan, the UK and the US. Ships of CTF-150 from the U.S. Navy include the Arleigh Burke-class destroyer Ramage and the Ticonderoga-class cruiser Bunker Hill. The aim of CTF-150's patrols is to "... stop SICC leaders or foreign militant supporters escaping" Somalia. In March 2007, following the Iranian seizure of Royal Navy personnel, Dwight D. Eisenhower began battle group exercises off the Iranian coastline. The following month, in April, the ship was relieved by Nimitz.

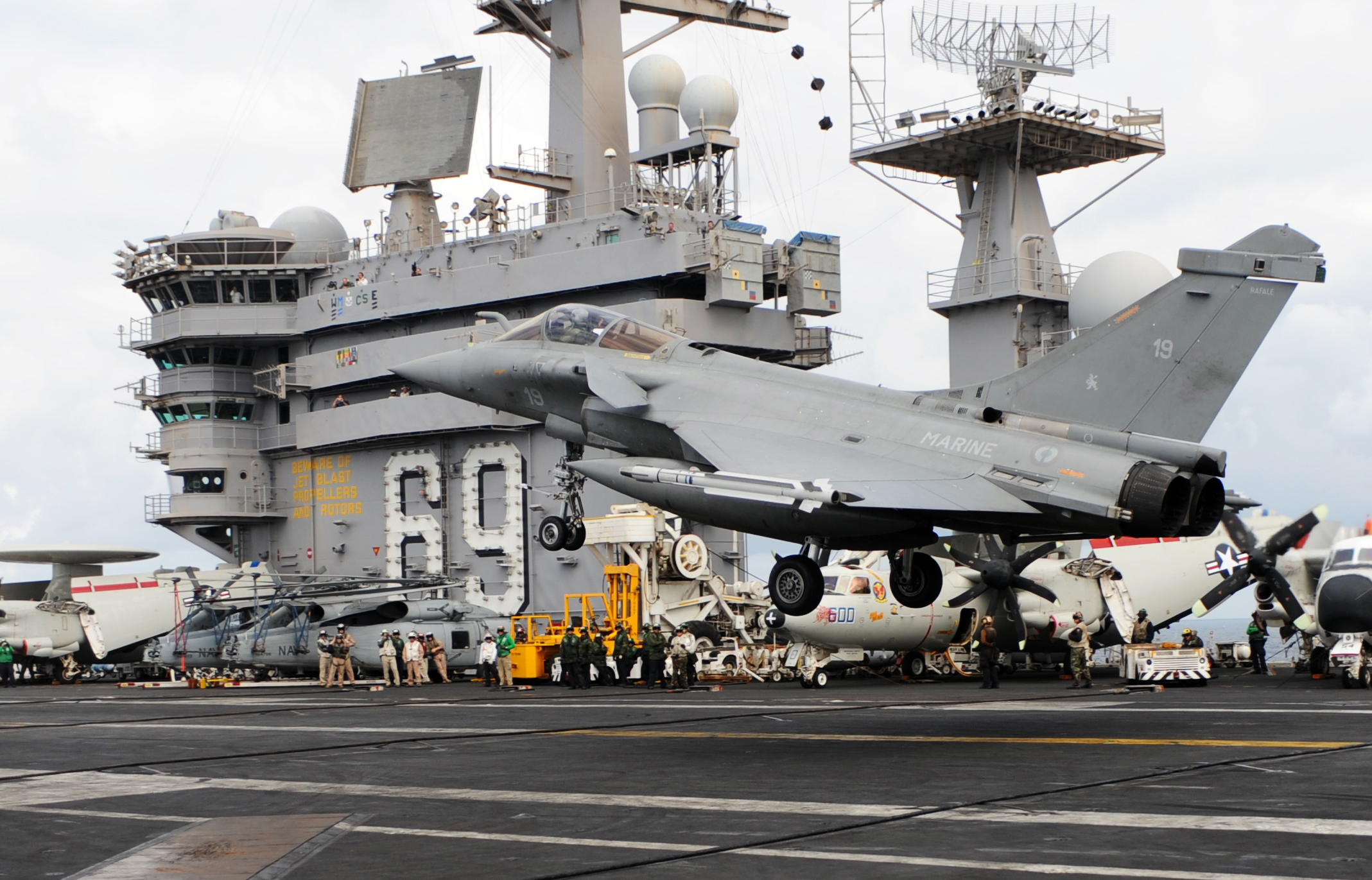
A French Dassault Rafale fighter aircraft conducts touch and go landings aboard Dwight D. Eisenhower during a coalition training exercise.

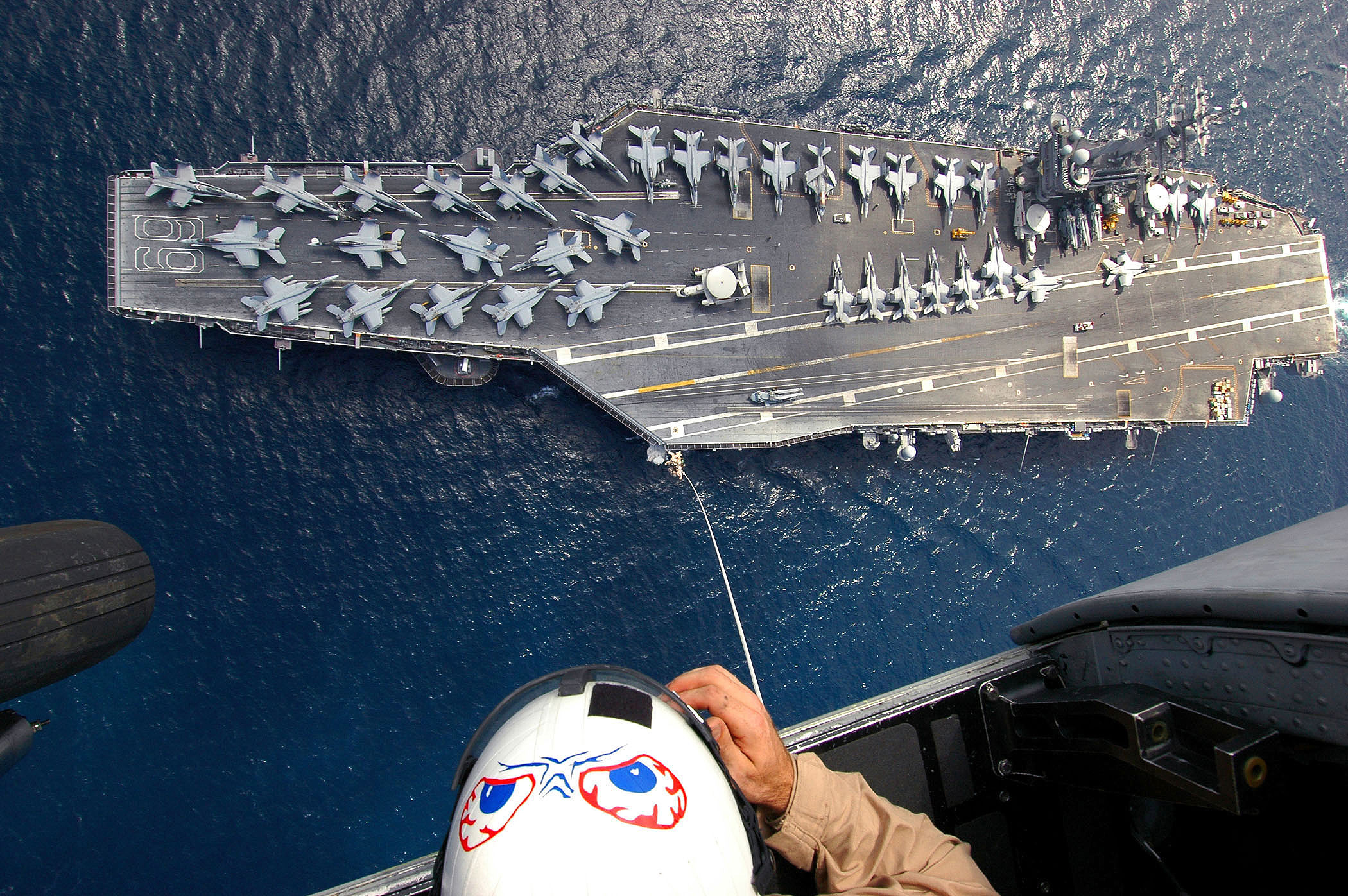
Explosive Ordnance Disposal Mobile Unit Six participates in Special Patrol Insertion/Extraction (SPIE) training session with Dwight D. Eisenhower

On 4 October 2008 Dwight D. Eisenhower Petty Officer 2nd Class Robert Lemar Robinson was killed aboard ship during training exercises off the coast of North Carolina. The sailor was struck and mortally wounded, by an airplane at 8:15 p.m. on the carrier's flight deck.

On 21 February 2009, Dwight D. Eisenhower deployed for the Arabian Sea and environs rotating into the forward-deployed forces there. She served as the flagship of Carrier Strike Group 8 commanded by Rear Admiral Kurt W. Tidd. Also embarked was Carrier Air Wing 7 and the staff of Commander, Destroyer Squadron 28. Other ships of Strike Group 8 were Bainbridge, Halyburton, Scranton, Vicksburg, and Gettysburg. In addition to supporting Operations Iraqi Freedom and Enduring Freedom, the strike group conducted maritime security operations including anti-piracy operations. On 16 May, Dwight D. Eisenhower became the first Nimitz-class carrier to dock pier-side in Manama, Bahrain. The last carrier to moor pierside in Bahrain was Rendova in 1948. On 30 July 2009, Dwight D. Eisenhower returned to Naval Station Norfolk after an almost six-month-long deployment.

=== 2010s ===
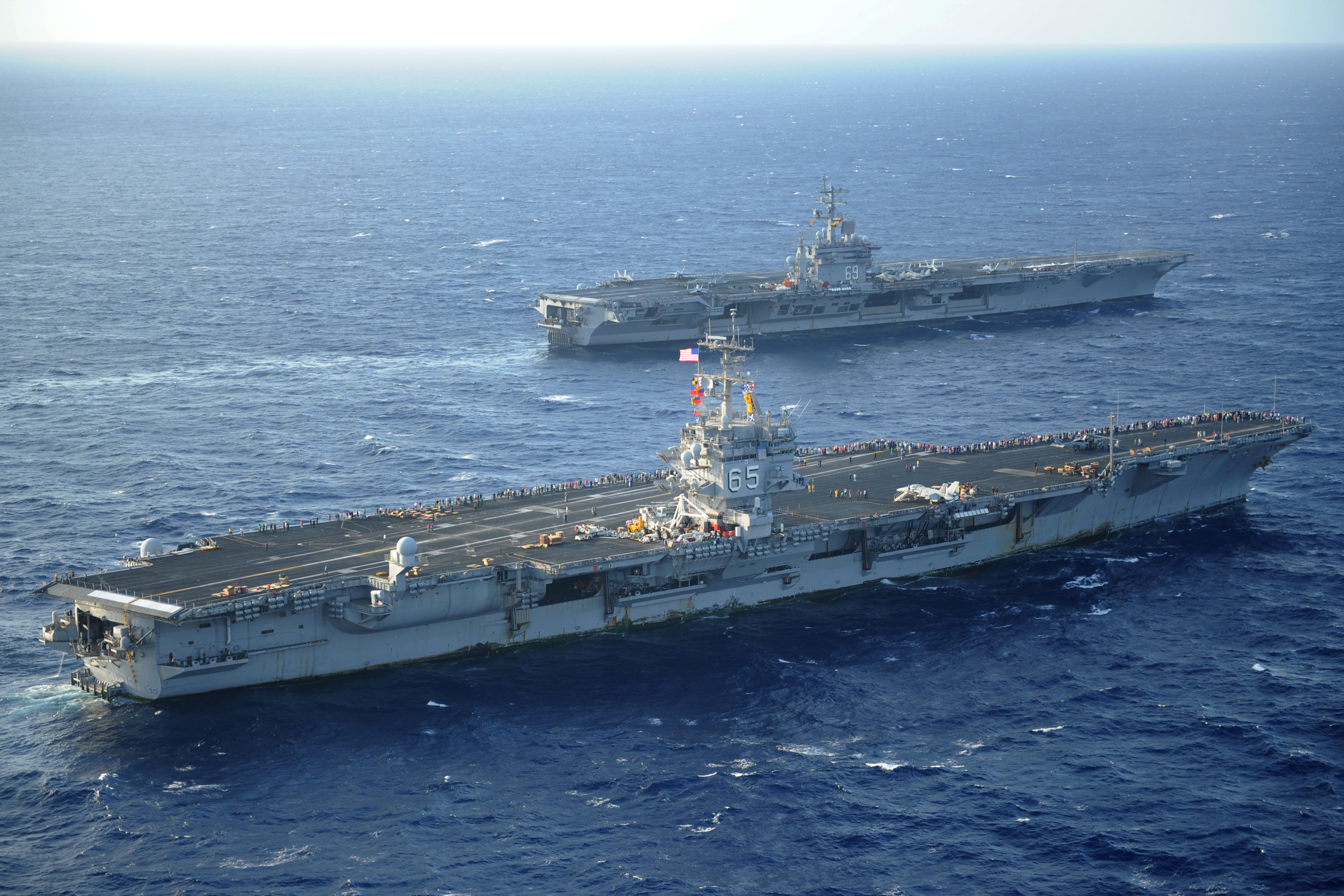
Dwight D. Eisenhower (background) on post-maintenance qualifications in the Atlantic Ocean, meets up with Enterprise returning from a cruise to the Mediterranean and the Persian Gulf in 2011

On 2 January 2010, Dwight D. Eisenhower again deployed to the U.S. 5th and 6th Fleet areas of operation in the Middle East. She served as the flagship of the Dwight D. Eisenhower Carrier Strike Group commanded by Rear Admiral Philip S. Davidson. While in theater, the strike group provided security cooperation, forward naval presence, maritime security, and crisis response. In addition to Ike, the strike group was made up of Carrier Air Wing 7; Commander, Destroyer Squadron 28; the guided-missile cruiser Hué City; and guided-missile destroyers McFaul, Carney, and Farragut. On 28 July 2010, Ike returned to her homeport in Norfolk.

The ship was placed in a planned incremental availability at Norfolk Naval Shipyard from September 2010 through June 2011. The ship was deployed again 7 June 2012 to the Middle East in support of Operation Enduring Freedom. The ship returned to homeport 19 December 2012. On 22 February 2013, Ike and Strike Group 8 departed for another Mediterranean and Mid-East deployment. After pulling into Marseille, France in early March, the German Sachsen-class frigate Hamburg became the first to fully integrate into an American strike group. Hamburg, commanded by Commander (FKpt) Ralf Kuchler (GN), remained with the strike group while it operated with the 5th fleet. The ship returned to homeport 3 July 2013. On 6 August the ship began an ammunition offload in preparation for an upcoming docked planned incremental availability (DPIA) at Norfolk Naval Shipyard. On 26 August 2014, the ship was moved to Berth 42–43 from Dry Dock #8 at Norfolk Naval Shipyard, and as of 4 February 2015, the DPIA was four months behind schedule, with the ship planned to remain in the yard until at least April 2015. On 3 September 2015, the ship went back to sea.

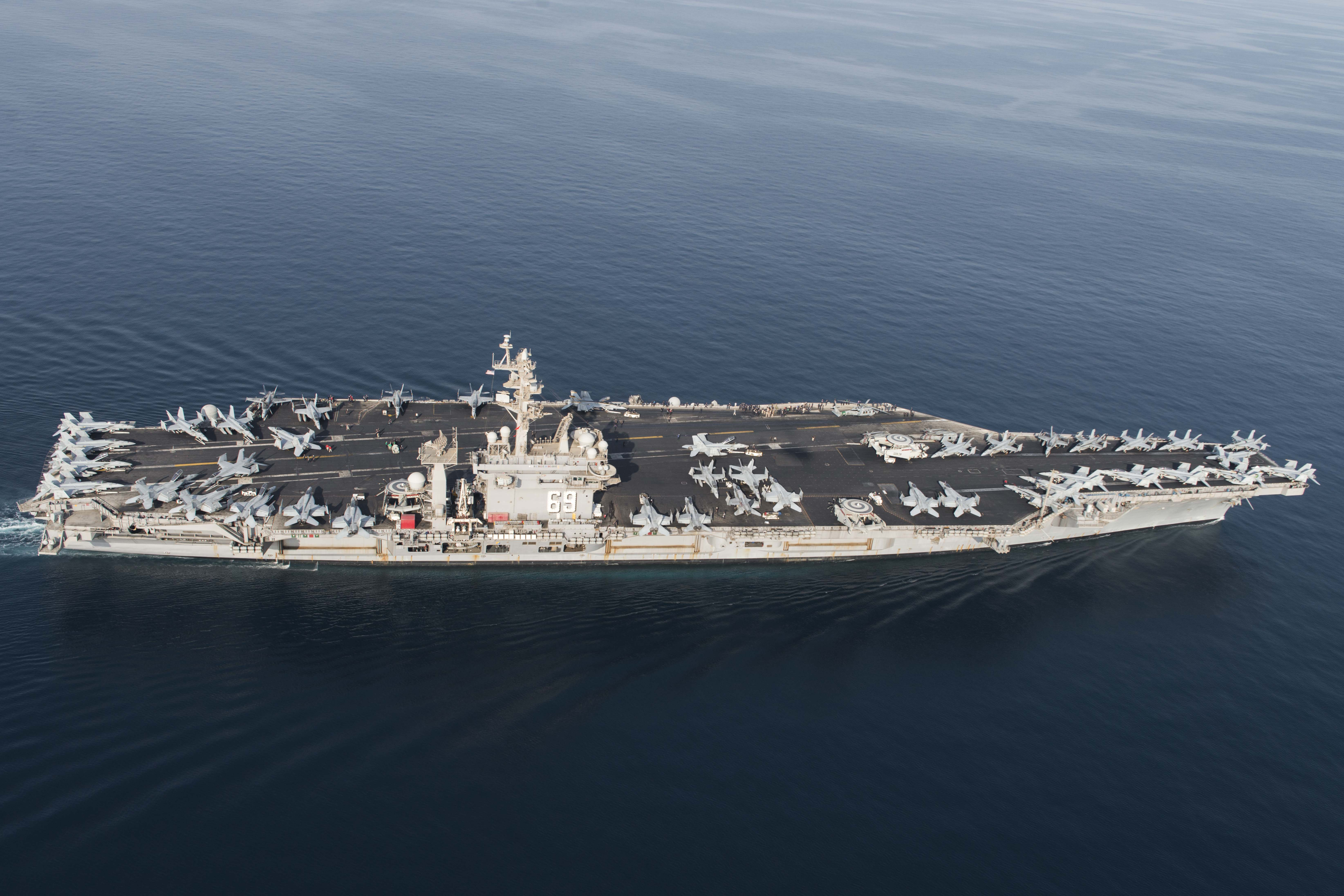
Dwight D. Eisenhower during Operation Inherent Resolve, 26 August 2016.

On 8 June 2016, Dwight D. Eisenhower and her Carrier Strike Group sailed the Atlantic Ocean into the U.S. 6th Fleet's area of operations (AoR) in support of U.S. national security interests in Europe. On 22 November 2016, Military Times reported that since June 2016, when the ship entered the Persian Gulf after launching strikes from the eastern Mediterranean, the carrier's Captain, Paul Spedero, reported that sorties from Dwight D. Eisenhower had dropped nearly 1,100 bombs on ISIS targets in Iraq and Syria. Ike returned to homeport Norfolk 30 December.

On 18 March 2016, while she was sailing off the coast of Virginia, eight members of her deck crew were injured when the arresting gear cables failed and "came apart", during the routine landing of an E-2 Hawkeye aircraft. Six of the injured deck crew were flown by helicopter to nearby shore-based hospitals, while the other two remained and were treated aboard ship. None of the eight suffered life-threatening injuries. The Hawkeye immediately resumed flight and landed safely at Chambers Field, Norfolk Naval Station, with no reports of injuries to her crew or damage to the aircraft.

In December 2016, the ship completed her 17th deployment to the Mediterranean and the Persian Gulf in support of Operation Inherent Resolve.

=== 2020s ===
On 13 January 2020, Dwight D. Eisenhower left Norfolk for her Composite Training Unit Exercise ahead of deploying. After exercising with Carrier Strike Group 10 until late February, Dwight D. Eisenhower immediately deployed to the Persian Gulf without returning to port, due to Dynamic Force Employment (DFE), a strategy to help make naval deployments less predictive.

On 26 June 2020, the ship surpassed the USS Theodore Roosevelt's record of 160 consecutive days at sea without a port call by reaching its 161st day. This new mark is attributed to the COVID-19 pandemic and the ship's operational commitment to "remain clean" by avoiding any contact with ports that carried the potential of introducing the novel coronavirus into the crew. On 25 and 26 July 2020, the Hellenic Air Force (HAF) co-trained with USS Dwight D. Eisenhower southeast of Crete.

On 3 March 2021, Dwight D. Eisenhower's Strike Group conducted Exercise Lightning Handshake with Royal Moroccan Navy frigate Tarik Ben Ziyad and Royal Moroccan Air Force fighter jets. On 5 March, the Italian frigate Luigi Rizzo underwent alongside her in the Strait of Gibraltar. On 2 April, Dwight D. Eisenhower, with Carrier Air Wing 3 and her Carrier Strike Group, transited the Suez Canal into the Red Sea in support of Operation Inherent Resolve.

==== Israel-Hamas war ====
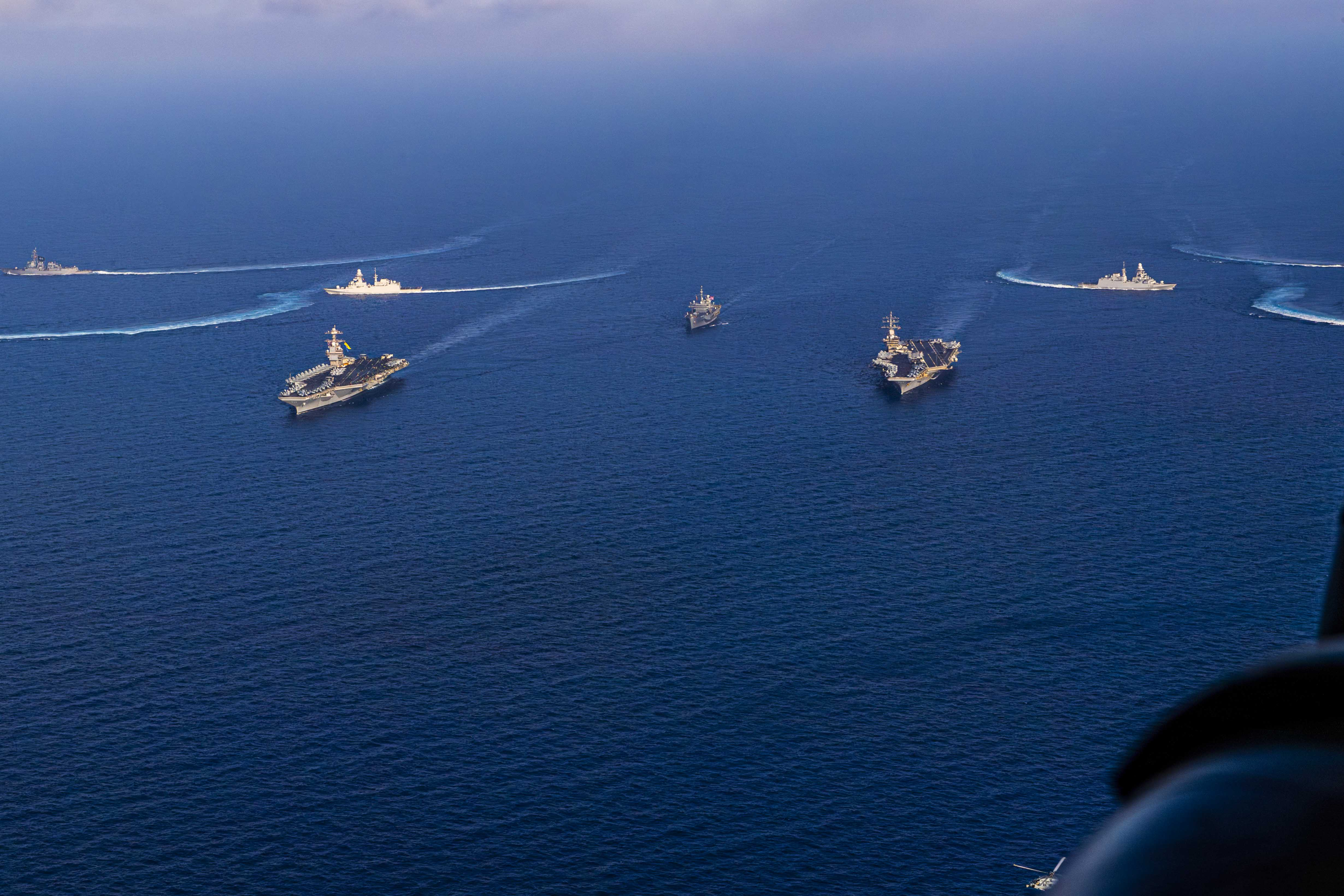
Dwight D. Eisenhower and Gerald R. Ford carrier strike groups flank Mount Whitney, 3 November 2023.

On 14 October 2023, Lloyd Austin directed Dwight D. Eisenhower and her carrier strike group, which includes the cruiser Philippine Sea, and destroyers Laboon, Mason and Gravely, to the eastern Mediterranean in response to Israel's war with Hamas. This is the second carrier strike group to be sent to the region in response to the conflict, following Gerald R. Ford and her group, which was dispatched only six days earlier.

To boost morale Captain Hill and senior officers have instituted a philosophy on the ship called "the Way of the Warrior Sailor." In his communication as a leader, Hill said he uses "rapid, relentless, repetitive, positive communication," or R3P. In doing so, Hill said he emphasizes the importance of acknowledging each sailor personally, highlighting the significance of their roles and reassuring them of their performance. "What does morale get us? Morale gets us success in battle," Hill explained to CBS 60 Minutes. "That's the ultimate goal. You know, it might allow you to do well on inspections, allow you to do well in your day-to-day activities. But ultimately, it's about combat and success … And it's working."

==== United States–Houthi conflict (2023–present) ====
On 26 December 2023, at 6:30 a.m., Dwight D. Eisenhower launched Super Hornet aircraft and, together with the destroyer Laboon, destroyed 12 attack drones, three anti-ship missiles and two ground attack cruise missiles in the southern Red Sea, fired from Yemen's Houthi rebels in an over 10 hour-action.

On 30 December, Danish container ship Maersk Hangzhou issued a distress call after coming under fire from four small ships commanded by Iranian-backed Houthi rebels from Yemen. Attempts were also made to board Maersk Hangzhou by force, while a contracted security team defended the ship. Dwight D. Eisenhower and guided missile destroyer Gravely responded to a distress call from the container ship. Verbal commands were radioed to the Houthi ships, while helicopters from Dwight D. Eisenhower were dispatched. After taking small arms fire, U.S. Navy helicopters returned fire, sinking three of the four Houthi ships. There was no damage to U.S. equipment or personnel. In the process of responding to the distress call, Gravely shot down two anti-ship ballistic missiles fired from Yemen.

On 10 January 2024, the Houthis carried out more missile attacks against US and UK ships. All projectiles were shot down by Dwight D. Eisenhower and other ships. On 12 January, aircraft from Carrier Air Wing Three embarked on Dwight D. Eisenhower, participated in the 2024 missile strikes in Yemen against Houthi rebels. Tomahawk cruise missiles were fired by the cruiser Philippine Sea as well as the destroyers Mason and Gravely, and the submarine Florida.

Dwight D. Eisenhower continued supporting Operation Prosperity Guardian and the 2024 missile strikes in Yemen until 26 April when she passed through the Suez Canal and entered the Eastern Mediterranean. She returned to the Red Sea in May to resume operations after a port call in Souda Bay, Crete. The Yemeni Supreme Political Council stated it launched two attacks on Dwight D Eisenhower, though American officials denied this, and no evidence has surfaced of such attacks. Fake footage of a damaged ship were shared across social media which were further amplified by pro-Chinese and pro-Russian social media accounts. Associated Press journalists toured the ship after the alleged attack and found no sign of battle damage. Captain Hill claimed during the Taco Tuesday on the ship that Houthis have claimed to have sunk the ship multiple times before, though the Houthi movement had never officially claimed to have sunk the carrier.

On 14 July 2024, Dwight D. Eisenhower returned to Naval Station Norfolk after a nine-month combat deployment. Aircraft from Carrier Air Wing 3 expended nearly 60 air-to-air missiles and 420 air-to-surface weapons during the deployment.

== Overhauls ==
- March 1978 to July 1978 – Post Shakedown Availability
- January 1981 to May 1981 – Selected Restricted Availability
- August 1982 to October 1982 – Selected Restricted Availability
- October 1985 to April 1987 – Complex Overhaul – forward port sponson added; Mk-25 BPDM replaced with Mk-29; 3 CIWS added; SPS-49 search radar replaces SPS-43.
- October 1988 to March 1989 – Selected Restricted Availability
- October 1990 to January 1991 – Selected Restricted Availability
- January 1993 to November 1993 – Selected Restricted Availability
- June 1995 to December 1997 – Complex Overhaul – aft boarding dock added.
- February 1999 to June 1999 – Planned Incremental Availability
- May 2001 to March 2005 – Refueling and Complex Overhaul – bridle catcher removed; top two levels of island replaced; new antenna mast; new radar tower; 2 RAM replace 1 CIWS/1 Mk-29 at forward port sponson/aft starboard sponson; 2 CIWS at island/stern removed.
- January 2008 to July 2008 – Planned Incremental Availability
- September 2010 to June 2011 – Planned Incremental Availability
- September 2013 to May 2015 – Planned Incremental Availability – 2 CIWS added; one on newly installed forward starboard sponson, one on newly installed aft port sponson.
- August 2017 to November 2018 – Planned Incremental Availability
- September 2021 to October 2022 – Planned Incremental Availability

== Eventual replacement ==
Dwight D. Eisenhower is scheduled to be replaced around 2029 by the new USS Enterprise (CVN-80), a Gerald R. Ford-class carrier, that as of fall 2018, is in the steel cutting and fabrication stages of construction. The exact date of the ship's inactivation and decommissioning will likely depend on many factors, including Defense Department funding considerations.

As of 2023, the Navy is considering extending the service life of Dwight D. Eisenhower.

== Awards ==
Dwight D. Eisenhower has earned a number of awards, including the Battle "E" in 1979, 1980, 1981, 1985, 1990, 1998, 1999, 2006, 2012 and 2022 as the most battle efficient carrier in the Atlantic Fleet. In 1999, she won the Marjorie Sterrett Battleship Fund Award for the Atlantic Fleet.

Ike and her crew have been awarded:

Combat Action Ribbon (October 2023 – April 2024)		Navy Unit Commendation with two bronze stars
Meritorious Unit Commendation with one silver and two bronze service star	Navy E Ribbon with Battle "E" devices (fourth award)	Navy Expeditionary Medal with two bronze stars
National Defense Service Medal with one bronze star	Armed Forces Expeditionary Medal with two bronze stars	Southwest Asia Service Medal with two bronze stars
Global War on Terrorism Expeditionary Medal with two bronze stars	Global War on Terrorism Service Medal	Armed Forces Service Medal
Sea Service Deployment Ribbon with three silver and two bronze stars	NATO Medal for Yugoslavia	Kuwait Liberation Medal (Kuwait)

== See also ==
- List of aircraft carriers of the United States Navy
- List of aircraft carriers (worldwide)
- U.S. Navy Numbered Fleets
- Carrier Strike Group
- Carrier air wing
