= Acacia Technologies =

Acacia Technologies may refer to

- A division of Acacia Research
- A division within Computer Associates that effectively closed down in 2002 when its assets were sold to SSA Global Technologies
