= ACDS =

ACDS may refer to:

- Assistant Chief of the Defence Staff, a senior appointment of the British Armed Forces
- Advanced combat direction system, a centralized, automated command-and-control system
- Arlington Country Day School, a K-12 private school
- Automatically controlled digital station
