= Sergio Messina =

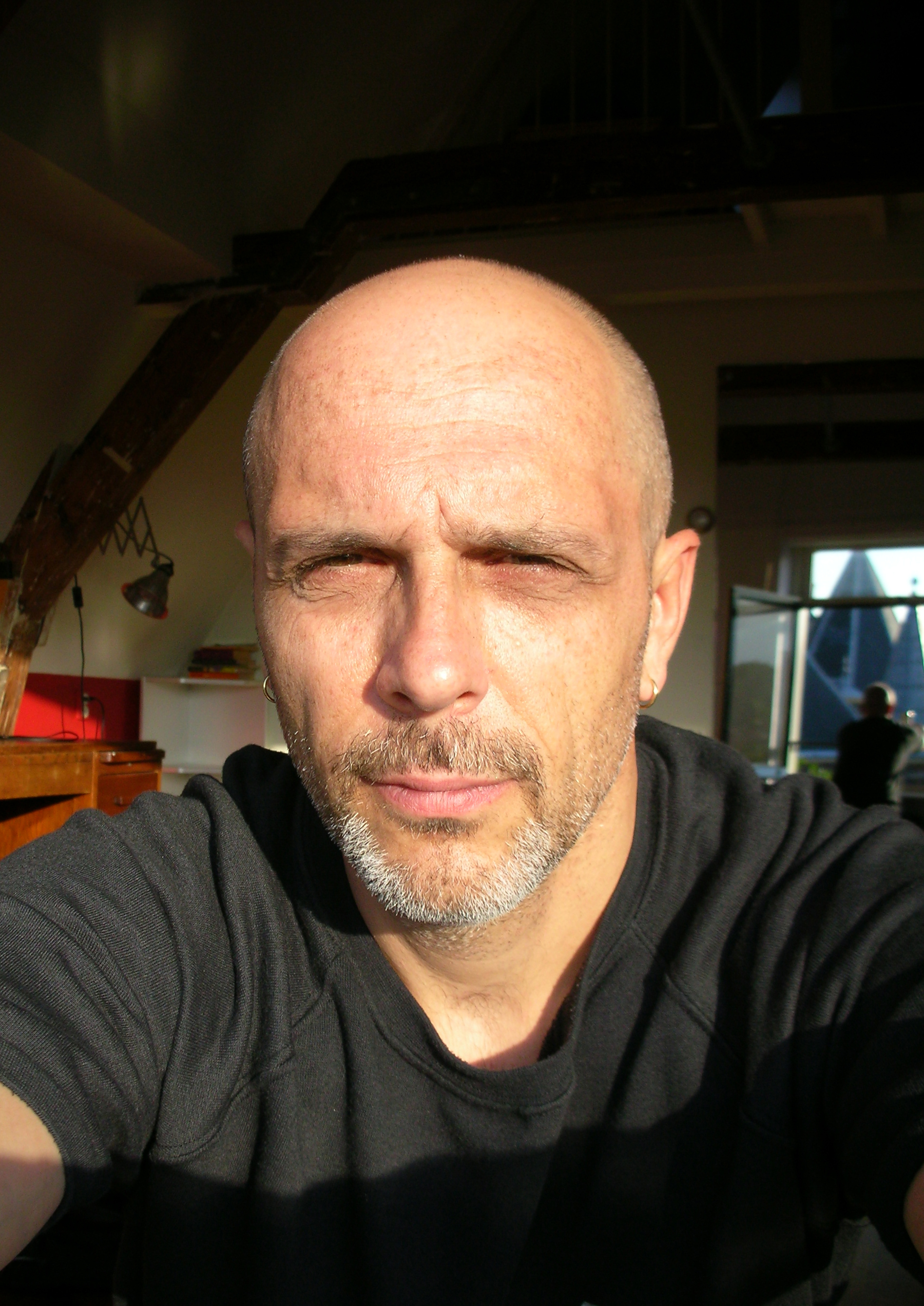
Sergio Messina (2006)

Sergio Messina (born September 18, 1959) is an Italian musician, radio maker, writer, teacher and artist.

In 1989 his no copyright, self distributed song Radiogladio got him international attention. Subsequently, he produced Curre curre guaglio', 99 Posse's debut album, and then his own La Vendetta del Mulino Bianco. As a remixer he's worked with many Italian musicians, including Avion Travel, Casino Royale and Elio e le Storie Tese. His Radio art works have been produced and broadcast by many stations worldwide since the late 80es, including the Italian RAI and the Austrian ORF. Since 1996 Messina has a page on the underground music magazine Rumore. From 2003 until 2007 he collaborated with the Italian edition of Rolling Stone magazine, writing about technology, rock'n'roll, and holding a column on alternative sexualities.

Since 2000, he has researched what he defines as Realcore (own term): digital amateur pornography freely distributed online. Between 2005 and 2012, he toured Europe with a live show entitled Realcore: the digital porno revolution, combining elements of research and performance. Mark Dery wrote in 2006: "Messina, 47, is the Margaret Mead of alt sex on the Internet." In 2009, he spent a semester at the School of the Art Institute of Chicago as a Visiting Artist and Faculty.

He currently teaches at the Sound Design course at Istituto Europeo di Design in Milano, where he also lectures on History of Pop Culture.
