= 99 Posse =

Italian hip hop/reggae band

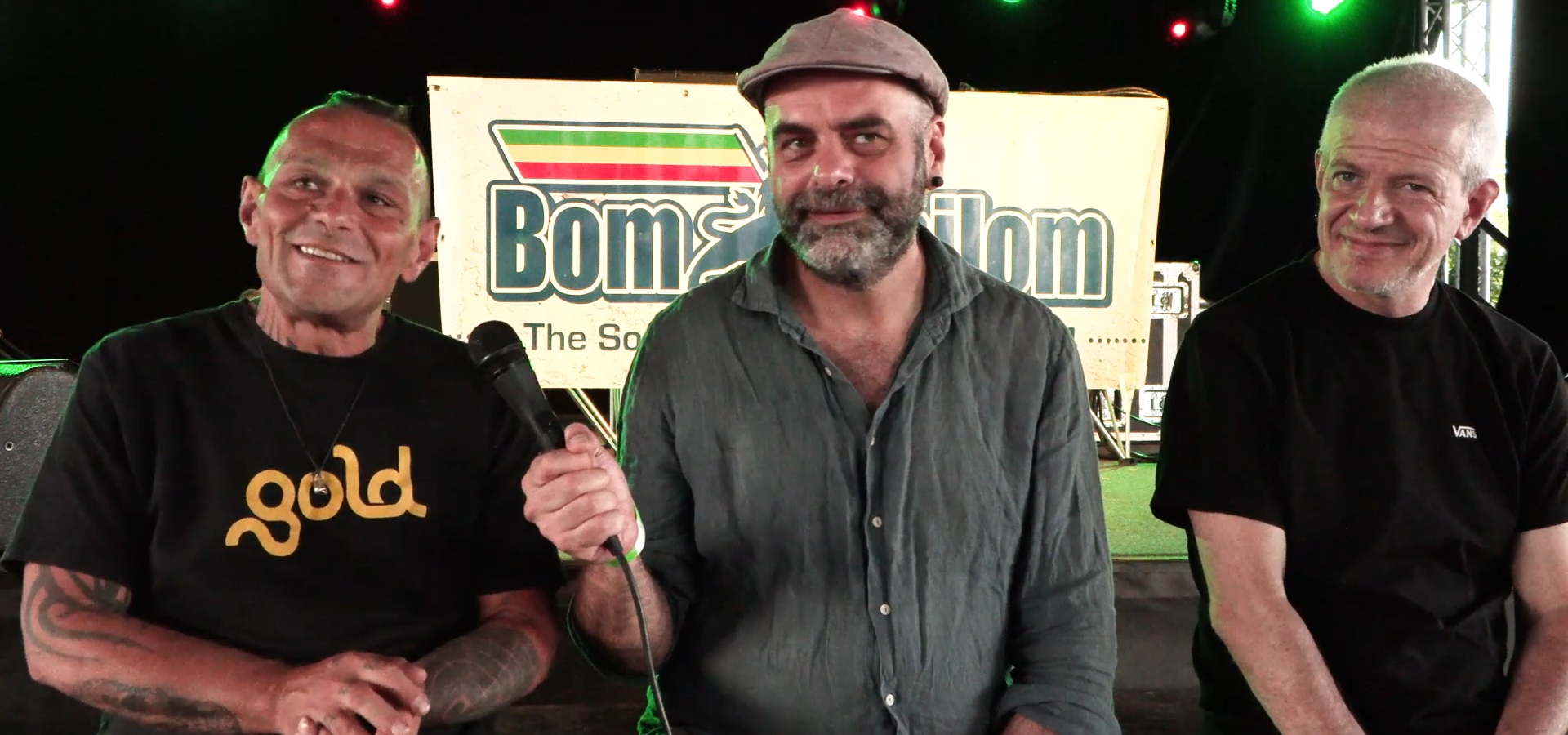
- 99 Posse (2022)

Background information
- Origin: Naples, Italy
- Genres: Hip hop, reggae, trip hop
- Years active: 1991–2005; 2009–present
- Past members: 'O Zulù; Kaya Pezz8; JRM; Sacha Ricci; Clark Kent
- Website: novenove.it

99 Posse is an Italian hip hop/reggae group from Naples. It raps both in Italian and in the local Neapolitan language. Most of 99 Posse's songs deal with political or social issues, and the group members are considered left-wing hardliners. As a showing of their activism, all of the group's albums have been released with a prezzo politico ("political price"): each CD displays a sticker saying "Don't pay more than...". For 99 Posse, this means "putting into practice a specific understanding about their relationship with the market, a sort of ideal practice". The group has gained popularity in Italy through its songs and its voicing of progressive political causes.

Its first album, Curre Curre Guagliò (1993), was mainly influenced by reggae and world music. Subsequent albums, Cerco Tiempo (1996) and Corto Circuito (1998), included new styles like drum 'n bass and trip hop. Curre Curre Guaglio was self-produced but rose from its underground status to become an iconic album and cultural manifesto that eventually inspired the film Sud by Oscar-winning director Gabriele Salvatores. The group also has its own record label, Novenove, which works to promote underground artists.

On 18 July 2009, they came back without Meg in Naples during a concert created by movements against repression and the blocking of 21 activists for the G8 summit at the University of Turin.

== Band members ==
=== Former members ===
- Luca "'O Zulù" Persico – vocals
- Marco "Kaya Pezz8" Messina – sampler and dub master
- Massimo "JRM" Jovine – bass
- Sacha Ricci – keyboard
- Claudio "Clark Kent" Marino – drums
- Maria "Meg" Di Donna – vocals
- Claudio Caca* – drums

== Discography ==
=== Studio albums ===
Date of release	Title	Studio	Label	Producer	Track listing
1993	Curre curre guagliò	Al Flying Recording Studio in Naples	Novenove/BMG	Sergio Messina; Radio Gladio&99Posse	1. "Esodo"; 2. "Curre curre guagliò" 3. "Salario Qawali"; 4. "'O documento" 5. "Rigurgito antifascista" 6. "Tuttapposto"; 7. "Rigurgito" (TV version); 8. "Napolì"; 9. "Nun c' a' facc' chiu" 10. "Ripetutamente"; 11. "1/2/1992"; 12. "Odio"; 13. "Rappresaglia"
1995	Guai a chi ci tocca	Splash and Flying Records in Naples	IO		1. "Scetateve Guagliu" (04:24); 2. "No Way" (04:57); 3. "Omaggio a Massimo" (00:49); 4. "Guai a chi ci tocca" (04:26); 5. "Il carabiniere di Siviglia" (00:28); 6. "'A Finanziaria" (05:29); 7. "Resiste Chiapas" (02:05); 8. "Sudditi" (05:00); 9. "Il tempo degli autonomi" (00:59); 10. "Cildren Ov Babilon" (04:31); 11. "Sasa" (01:54); 12. "Hip Hop Serio" (04:48); 13. "Tu lo chiami dio" (05:59)
1996	Cerco tiempo	Flying Records in Naples	IO	Kwanzaa Posse	1. "Si tuu" 2. "Non c'è tempo" 3. "Pecché"; 4. "Senza ritornello" 5. "Balla e piensa" 6. "La gatta mammona" 7. "Fujakkà"; 8. "Facendo la storia" 9. "Spara"; 10. "Avrei voluto..."
1998	Corto circuito	Transeuropa Recording Studio in Turin	IO	99 Posse e Carlo U. Rossi	1. "Buongiorno" (05:02); 2. "Corto circuito" (05:10); 3. "Me siente?" (04:14); 4. "Lettera al presidente" (04:29); 5. "Quello che" (04:12); 6. "Era na vota" (04:59); 7. "Vulesse" (05:13); 8. "Focolaio" (03:48); 9. "Bon voyage" (05:10); 10. "Nell'era della confusione semiotica" (04:42); 11. "Siente 'o funk" (03:26); 12. "Pagherete caro" (11:59)
2000	La vida que vendrá	Folder Studio in Naples	Musica Posse / Self Distribuzione	99 Posse e Carlo U. Rossi	1. "Comincia Adesso"; 2. "Sfumature"; 3. "L'Anguilla" (feat. Speaker Cenzou); 4. "All'Antimafia" (feat. Papa J); 5. "Esplosione Imminente"; 6. "Sub"; 7. "Yankee Go Home!"; 8. "Comuntwist"; 9. "Some Say This, Some Say That" (feat. General Levy); 10. "A Una Donna"; 11. "Canto r' 'o Putatore"; 12. "Povera Vita Mia"; 13. "La Scelta"; 14. "El Pueblo Unido"
2011	Cattivi Guagliuni	Folder Studio in Naples	Musica Posse / Self Distribuzione	99 Posse	1. "University of Secondigliano" (feat. Clementino); 2. "Canto pe' dispietto" (feat. Nuova Compagnia di Canto Popolare); 3. "Cattivi guagliuni" 4. "La paranza di San Precario" (feat. Speaker Cenzou & Valerio Jovine); 5. "Italia Spa"; 6. "Vilipendio"; 7. "Yes Weekend"; 8. "Tarantelle pe' campà" (feat. Caparezza); 9. "Morire tutti i giorni" (feat. Daniele Sepe & Valerio Jovine); 10. "Antifa 2.0" (feat. Valerio Jovine); 11. "Resto umano" (feat. Daniele Sepe); 12. "Confusione totale" (feat. Valerio Jovine); 13. "Mò basta" (feat. Fuossera); 14. "Mai più sarò saggio" 15. "Penso che non me ne andrò" (feat. Speaker Cenzou & Valerio Jovine)

=== Live albums ===
Year	Title
1994	Incredibile opposizione tour 94
2001	NA9910º

== Bibliography ==
- Behan, Tom. (2007) Putting spanners in the works: the politics of the 99 Posse. Popular Music 26.03, 497–504.
- Cavallo, Vincenzo; Chambers, Iain. (n.d.). "Neapolitan Nights: from Vesuvian Blues to Planetary Vibes"
- Dello Iacovo, Rosario. (2014) Curre curre guagliò: Storie dei 99 Posse. Milan: Baldini&Castoldi.
- Dines, Nick. (1999) "Centri sociali: occupazioni autogestite a Napoli negli anni novanta", Quaderni di sociologia, 43(21), 90-111.
- Messina, Marcello. (2016) "Cattivi guagliuni: the identity politics of 99 Posse". In P. Guerra, & T. Moreira (Eds.), Keep it Simple, Make it Fast! An approach to underground music scenes, Vol. 2, (pp. 131-136). Porto: University of Porto. Faculty of Arts and Humanities.
- Pugliese, Joseph. (2008). "Whiteness and the blackening of Italy: La guerra cafona, extracomunitari and provisional street justice". PORTAL Journal of Multidisciplinary International Studies, 5(2).
