= USS Newport News (SSN-750) =

Los Angeles-class nuclear-powered attack submarine of the US Navy

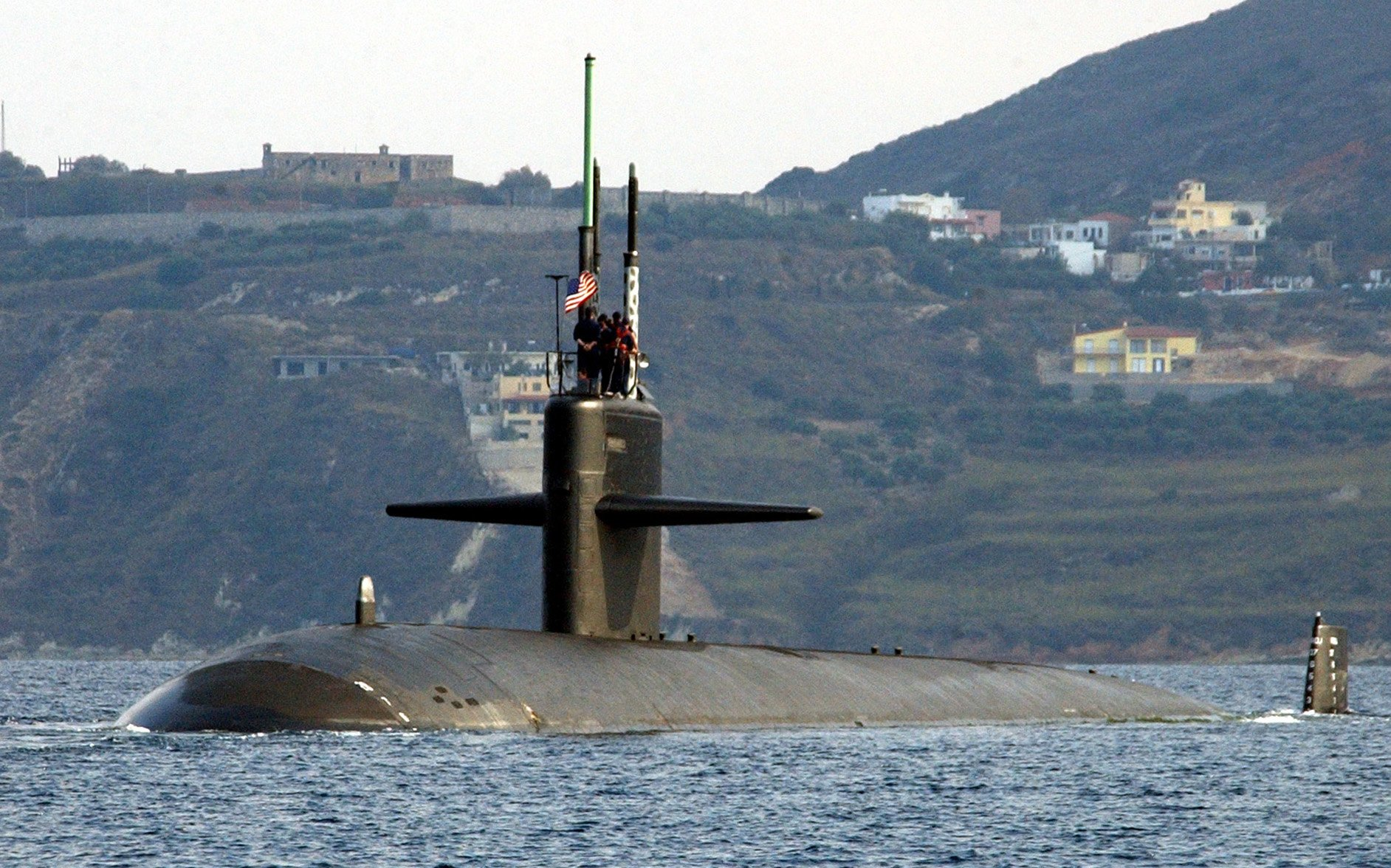
- USS Newport News, in October 2004

History

United States
- Name: USS Newport News
- Namesake: The City of Newport News, Virginia
- Awarded: 19 April 1982
- Builder: Newport News Shipbuilding
- Laid down: 3 March 1984
- Launched: 15 March 1986
- Commissioned: 3 June 1989
- Home port: Norfolk, Virginia
- Identification: MMSI number: 369970208; Callsign: NHTV
- Motto: Magni Nominis Umbra; (Latin:"Under the shadow of a great name"); Unofficial: "Thunder From Below"
- Status: Awaiting decommissioning
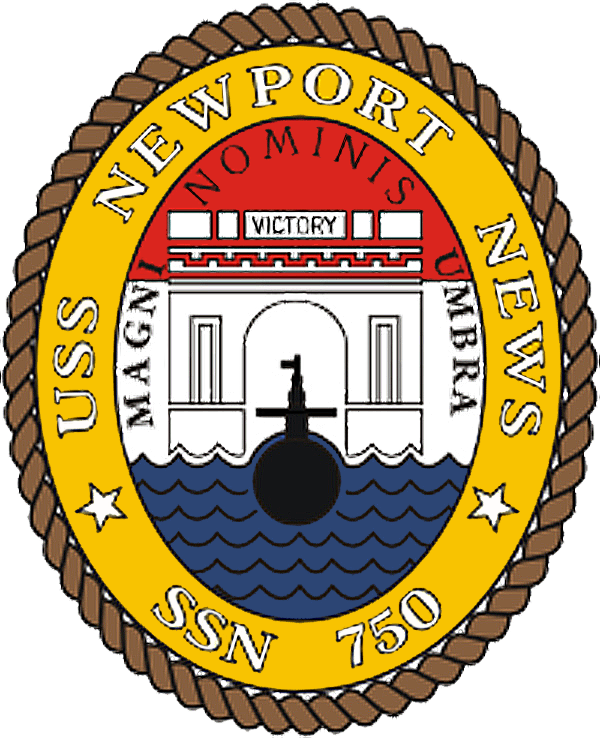
- Badge

General characteristics
- Class & type: Los Angeles-class submarine
- Displacement: 5,700 long tons (5,791 t) light; 6,072 long tons (6,169 t) full; 1,372 long tons (1,394 t) dead
- Length: 110.3 m (361 ft 11 in)
- Beam: 10 m (32 ft 10 in)
- Draft: 9.4 m (30 ft 10 in)
- Propulsion: 1 × S6G PWR nuclear reactor with D2W core (165 MW), HEU 93.5%; 2 × steam turbines (33,500) shp; 1 × shaft; 1 × secondary propulsion motor 325 hp (242 kW)
- Speed: 25 knots (46 km/h) surfaced; 30 knots (56 km/h) submerged (actual top speed classified)
- Test depth: 290 m (950 ft)
- Complement: 13 officers; 121 enlisted
- Armament: 4 × 21 in (533 mm) bow tubes; Mark 48 torpedo; Harpoon missile; Tomahawk cruise missile

USS Newport News (SSN-750), a Los Angeles-class submarine, is the third ship of the United States Navy to be named for Newport News, Virginia.

== History ==
On 19 April 1982, the contract to build her was awarded to Newport News Shipbuilding and Dry Dock Company in Newport News, Virginia. Her keel was laid down on 3 March 1984. She was launched on 15 March 1986, sponsored by Mrs. Rosemary D. Trible, and commissioned on 3 June 1989. Mayor Jessie M. Rattley presented the ship with a commemorative plaque containing the poem "Newport News," written by Newport News native Ronald W. Bell, whose poem "Admiral Rickover" also appears upon a plaque aboard the Los Angeles-class submarine Hyman G. Rickover.

=== Collision with Japanese ship ===
On 8 January 2007, Newport News was submerged in the Arabian Sea south of the Straits of Hormuz when the submarine hit the Japanese tanker Mogamigawa. She had been operating as part of Carrier Strike Group 8 (CSG-8), organized around the aircraft carrier Dwight D. Eisenhower (CVN-69). The Carrier Strike Group was redeploying to the Indian Ocean to support a maritime cordon during the war in Somalia when the incident happened.

Newport News suffered damage to her bow, but there was no damage to the sail, mast or reactor, and she made for port in Bahrain under her own power. Newport News was escorted from the mouth of the Straits of Hormuz to Bahrain by the Guided Missile Destroyer Benfold. This was because the submarine could not transit submerged and had no surface defense capabilities. During the transit, Iranian aircraft and warships shadowed the ships. An official of the Kawasaki Kisen Company (or K Line), which owns the tanker, announced that Mogamigawa's hull and propellers were damaged.

According to a Navy spokesman, the collision occurred due to the venturi effect. The tanker passed over the area where the submarine was submerged and this created a sucking impact that forced the submarine upward to the surface. The incident was the third collision between a US nuclear-powered submarine and a Japanese civilian ship.

On 29 January, after the boat returned to Bahrain for repairs, administrative personnel actions, also known as Admiral's Masts, were taken against several crew members, including relieving the boat's commanding officer of command due to a lack of confidence in his ability to command.

On 10 April, the Iranian Fars News Agency reported that Newport News has been leaking radioactive and chemical pollution into the Persian Gulf and claimed that following this formal complaint, the ship departed the gulf for a complete overhaul. The US Navy Fifth Fleet denied this claim, restating that damage was limited to the bow and that the sail, mast and reactors were not damaged. In October 2007, the US Navy agreed to pay Kawasaki Kisen Kaisha Ltd, the company that owns Mogamigawa, an undisclosed amount in compensation for the collision.

2025 Iceland

On 9 July, 2025 the USS Newport News conducted a port visit in Grundartangi, Iceland, becoming the first nuclear powered vessel to conduct a port visit to Iceland. The visit was representative of American and NATO cooperation in the defense of the Arctic to oppose Russian presence in the region.

Newport News was inactivated on January 31, 2026.

== Gallery ==
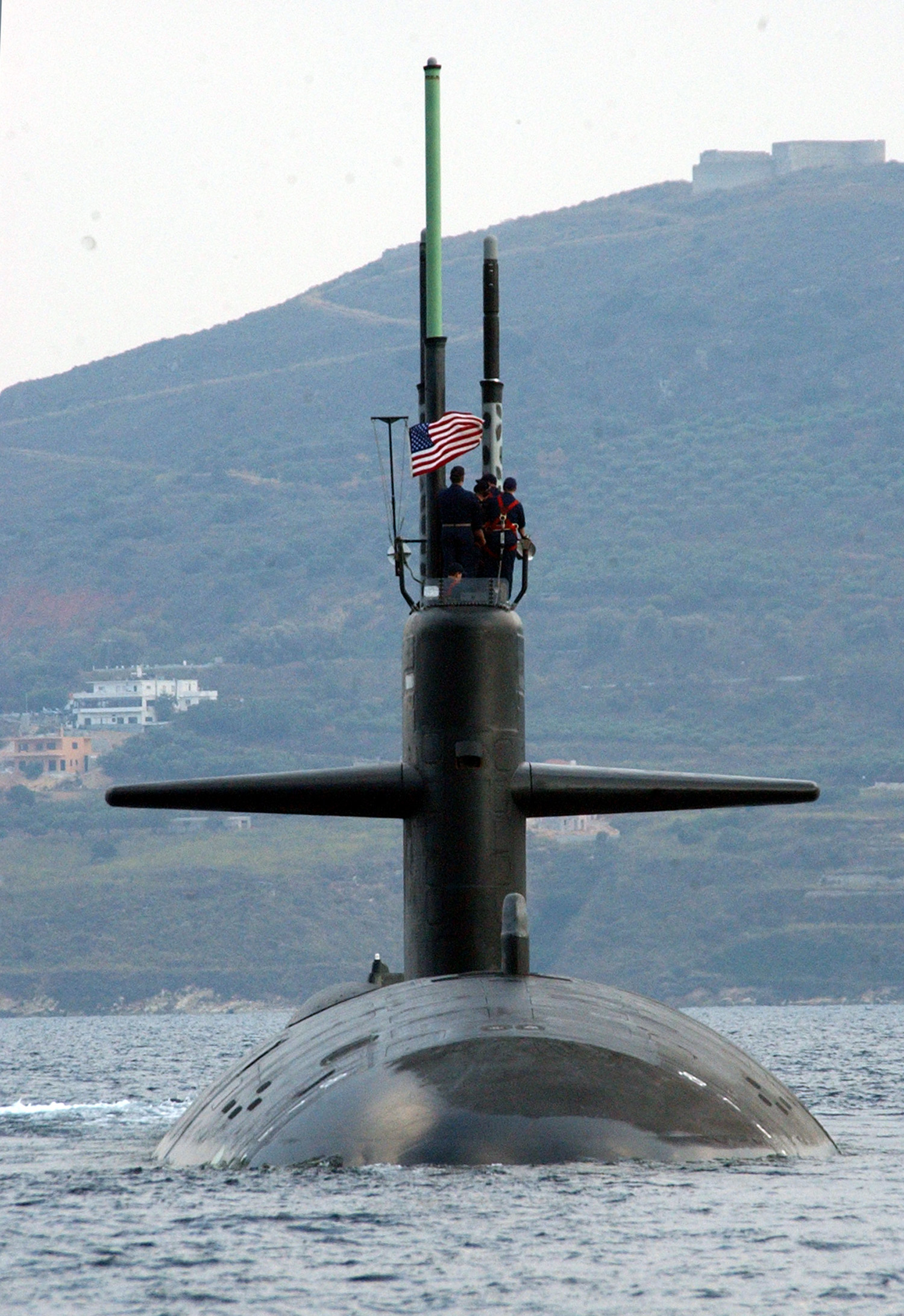
Newport News departing Souda Bay, Greece, 2004

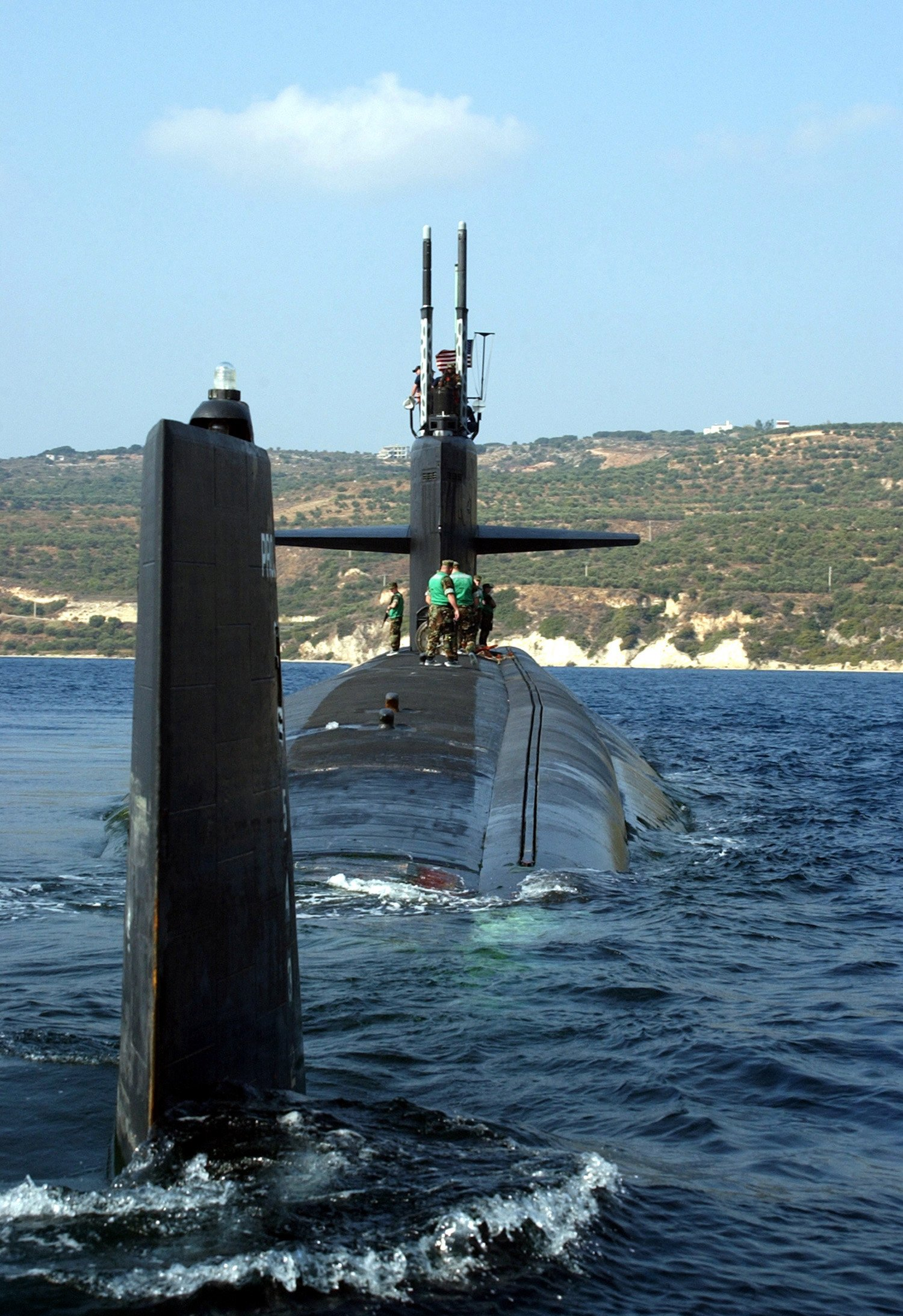
Newport News off the coast of Crete, 2004

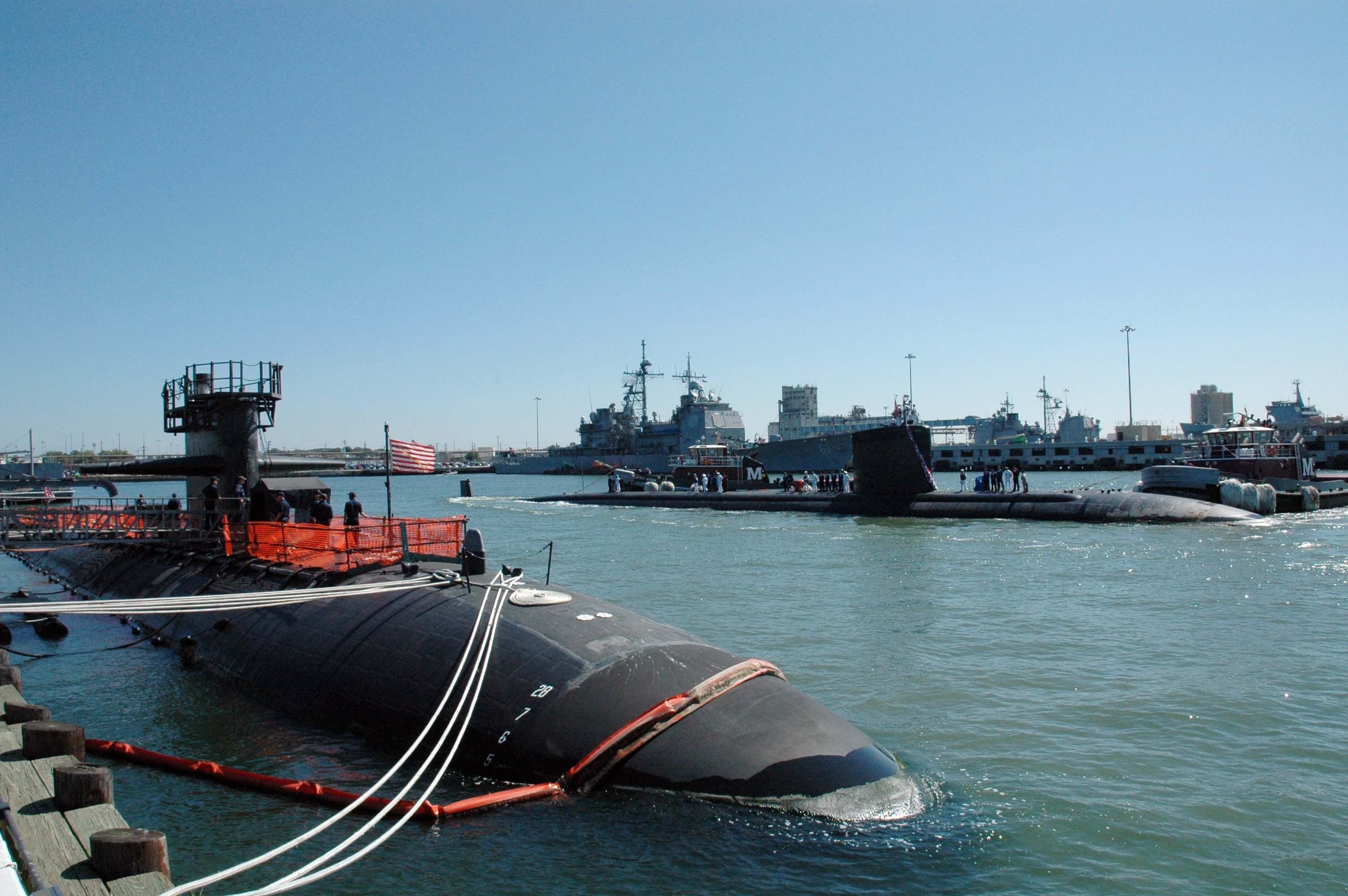
Newport News with USS Scranton (SSN-756) in Norfolk, Virginia, 2005

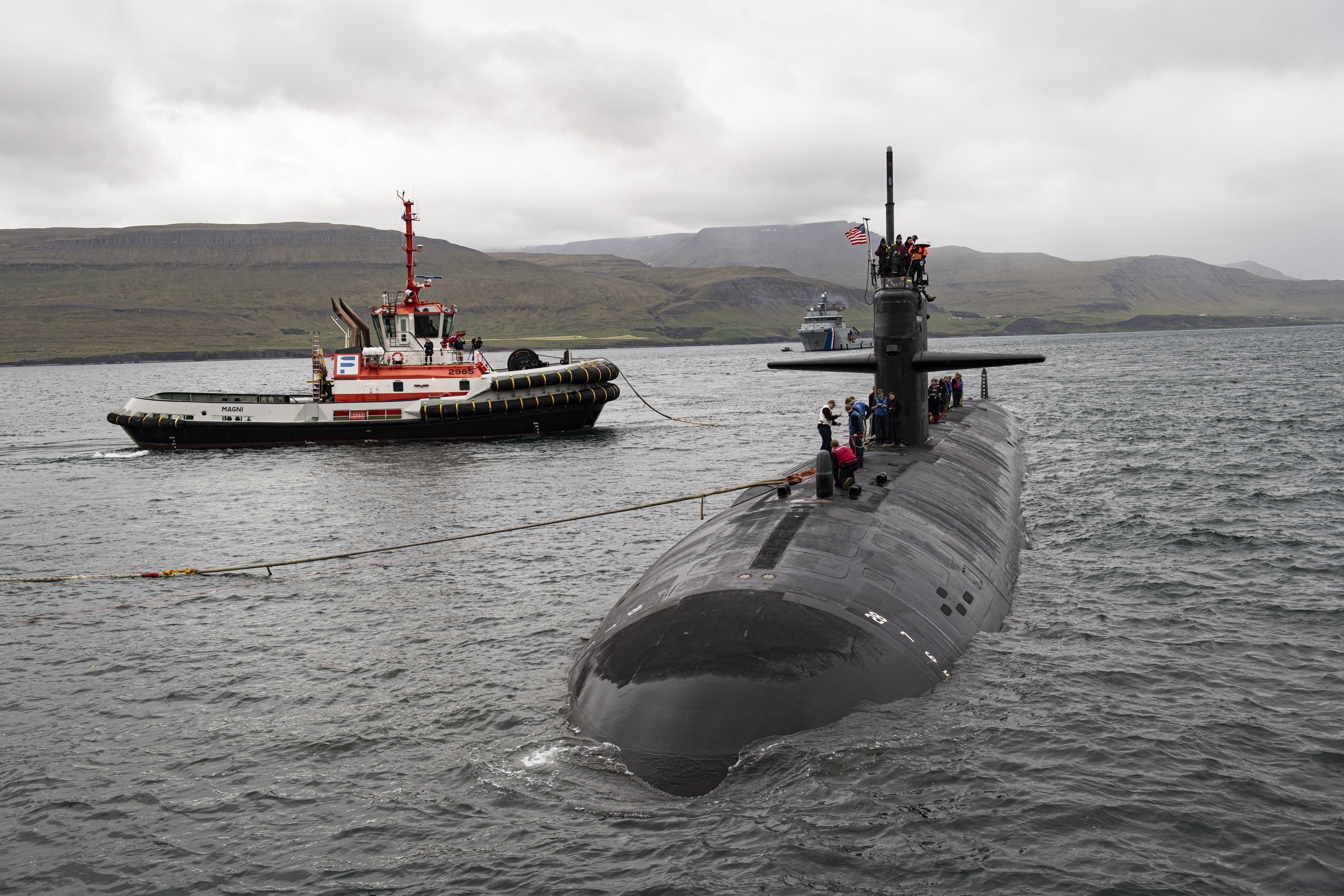
Newport News in Iceland, 2025
