= Homegrown Video =

American pornography production company

- Company type: Private
- Industry: Pornography
- Founded: 1982; 44 years ago
- Founder: Greg Swaim
- Headquarters: Los Angeles, United States
- Key people: Greg Swaim (Founder); Farrell Timlake (aka Tim Lake) (President); SG (CEO)
- Products: Amateur, homemade adult films.
- Website: homegrownvideo.com

Homegrown Video is an independent amateur pornographic video production company based in San Diego. Established in 1982. it was the first company to commercially release and distribute homemade, amateur pornography on videotape.

== History ==
Homegrown Video was born out of the back room of a tiny mom and pop video store in San Diego, CA. The advancement of video cameras and VHS tapes allowed Greg Swaim, the store's owner, to begin filming real couples at his popular sex parties. Swaim called the videos “Homegrown Videos” and rented them at his shop. In 2007, AVN magazine listed “Homegrown Video #1”, the brand's flagship title, as one of the 50 most influential adult video titles ever released, as it was responsible for creation of the amateur pornography genre in adult video. Homegrown Video was the first company to distribute people's homemade sex tapes; Swaim solicited amateur tapes by advertising “Send in your home videos and earn up to $20 per minute” at the end of each Homegrown Video tape.

In 1993, Swaim sold Homegrown Video to Farrell Timlake (adult performer Tim Lake), who had submitted amateur videos of himself and his wife in the past. Swaim sold the company due to a mismanagement of funds and impending bankruptcy. Still inspired by the first Homegrown Video VHS they ever watched, the Timlakes decided to purchase the company in 1993, with money borrowed from Farrell's mother.

Timlake and his partners expanded the business to the Internet, cable television while taking the sales of their videotapes and DVDs worldwide. Author Eric Schlosser, in writing about Homegrown Video said the company served “as a clearinghouse for the democracy of porn, supplying hard-core videos by the people, for the people". The self-titled flagship title is now well past 800 volumes and is acknowledged as the longest running series in the history of porn.

Homegrown Video's establishment and domination of the amateur porn market is evident in its 11 AVN Awards and 2 XBIZ Awards for Best Amateur Release, Best Amateur Series, and Niche Studio of the Year.

== Farrell Timlake, President ==
AVN Hall of Fame inductee Farrell Timlake (stage name: Tim Lake) and his partners have grown the brand's extensive library of amateur content in an ever-growing variety of niches.

In 1997, Timlake was brought on as Associate Producer and porn industry consultant for Trey Parker and Matt Stone's feature movie, Orgazmo, which included a cameo performance. Much of the porn humor, and porn industry details, in the movie has been attributed to Timlake's real life experiences in the adult industry. While researching for Orgazmo, Trey Parker was invited to an adult industry filming party at Buck Henry's house, which had been rented for the shoot. The resulting footage of the xxx-rated film Profiles #8, includes in the background mainstream actors Carrie Fisher, Richard Dreyfuss, and Timothy Hutton, in addition to Trey Parker and Matt Stone.

Timlake has, to date, performed in over 72 films, as well as directed and produced over 17 titles, culminating in 11 AVN Awards.

== SG, CEO ==
Homegrown Video CEO and self-professed “porn nerd” SG was interested in creating an amateur porn series to sell online; G's brother introduced him to Farrell Timlake, who hired G as he demonstrated keen awareness of the fledgling online market. G was made a partner in Homegrown's parent entity, New Destiny Internet Group, where G lent his knowledge of technology and analytics to the company. By 1998 G revamped Homegrown's web department, and by 2000, Homegrown became the Internet's go-to source for quality amateur videos. Being part of the technology and business side of porn put G in the spotlight in 2004, when he led the industry trade group to fight technology patent lawsuits filed by Acacia Research.

In March 2013, with over a decade of hands-on experience, trusted business relationships, and a strong ethic guiding him, Goldberg was promoted to CEO of Homegrown Video.

== Legal controversy ==
Starting in 2002, Acacia Media Research filed suit against more than 1000 adult production companies, including Homegrown Video, over patent infringement claims over the use of Digital Media Transmission technology. During the course of the nearly-decade-long litigation, Acacia entered into licensing agreements with Hustler, Vivid, and Wicked. The creation of the "Adult Media Defense Group" in 2007, led by Homegrown Video CEO SG, spoke out publicly over the legality of the suit. As lead defendant in the case, Goldberg asserted that it was impossible to file suits based on a key patent that was indifferent to the mode of telecommunication. The suit was invalidated in 2009 by a federal judge; a federal appeals court affirmed the ruling in 2010.

== Awards ==
List of accolades received by Homegrown Video
Awards & nominations
Award	Won	Nominated
AVN Awards	11	N/A
XBIZ Awards	4	N/A
Venus Fair (Germany)	1	N/A
Adam Film World Guild Award	1	N/A
- Total number of wins and nominations
Totals	17

Year	Ceremony	Category	Work
1995	AVN Award	Best Amateur Release	“Homegrown Video #432”
1997	AVN Award	Best Amateur Release	“Southern Belles 4”
1998	AVN Award	Best Amateur Release	“Southern Belles 8”
2000	AVN Award	Best Pro-Am or Amateur Series	“Homegrown Video”
2001	AVN Award	Best Pro-Am or Amateur Release	“California College Student Bodies 16”
2004	AVN Award	Best Amateur Series	“Homegrown Video”
2005	AVN Award	Best Amateur Series	“Homegrown Video”
2007	AVN Award	Best Amateur Series	“Homegrown Video”
2008	Venus Fair - Berlin, Germany	Best Amateur Label	“Homegrown Video”
2008	AVN Award	Best Amateur Release	“Cherries 56”
2008	Adam Film World Guild Award	Best Pure Amateur Company 2008	"Homegrown Video"
2009	AVN Award	Best Amateur Series	“Cherries”
2010	AVN Award	Best Amateur Series	“Homegrown Video”
2001	XBIZ Award	Niche Studio of the Year	N/A
2013	XBIZ Award	Amateur Release of the Year, 2013	"Homegrown Amateur Coeds #18"
2014	XBIZ Award	Amateur Release of the Year, 2014	"Amateur College Girls 6"
2015	XBIZ Award	Amateur Release of the Year, 2015	"Homegrown Video 850"
