= Ship Self-Defense System =

Combat system for non-AEGIS ships of the US Navy

The Ship Self-Defense System (SSDS) is a combat system specifically designed for anti-air defense of aircraft carriers, and most other non-Aegis United States Navy combat ships. It coordinates several existing shipboard systems. Multi-sensor integration, parallel processing and the coordination of hard and soft kill countermeasure capabilities are key components of the SSDS. Responses to airborne threats are based on automated or man-in-the-loop engagement doctrine.

The SSDS system coordinates many sensors, self-defense weapons and countermeasures installed aboard United States Navy ships. The main objective of SSDS is countering sea-skimming anti-ship missile threats, but it can also engage high-diving anti-ship missiles and aircraft. A major advantage SSDS holds over other defense systems is the integration of many disparate sensors and the ability to automate the fire control loop to shorten overall detect-to-engage timeline.

SSDS does not improve the capability of individual sensors, but it fuses the active and passive sensors to form a composite track and improve automatic target tracking. The major benefits of this combination are an improved anti-cruise missile capability and faster reaction times in the littoral battle space and using track data from the other fleet and land sensors with the Cooperative Engagement Capability.

As well as controlling the hard-kill weapons on board such as the Evolved Sea-Sparrow Missile and the Rolling Airframe Missile- the SSDS is also integrated into the soft-kill equipment, including decoys and control of the electronic warfare system. It also includes embedded software that enables the system to be used as the auto detection to engage the decision aid.

SSDS Mark 2 has six variants:

- Mod 1, used in CVN 68 class aircraft carriers
- Mod 2, used in LPD-17 class amphibious ships
- Mod 3, used in LHD-1 class amphibious ships
- Mod 4, for LHA-6 class amphibious ships
- Mod 5, for LSD-41 and LSD-49 amphibious ship classes
- Mod 6, in development for CVN 78 class aircraft carriers

The sensors that are fused into a composite picture include:

- AN/SPS-49 air search radar,
- AN/SPS-48E & G three dimensional air search radar,
- The Dual Band Radar (SPY-3 & SPY-4) on CVN 78 class,
- AN/SPQ-9B horizon search radar,
- AN/SPS-67 surface search radar,
- AN/SPS-73 surface search/navigation radar system,
- AN/SLQ-32 electronic warfare system,
- Centralized Identification Friend or Foe (CIFF).

== See also ==
- Advanced combat direction system
- H/ZKJ
- Naval Tactical Data System
