= Advanced combat direction system =

Command and control technology used in ships and aircraft carriers

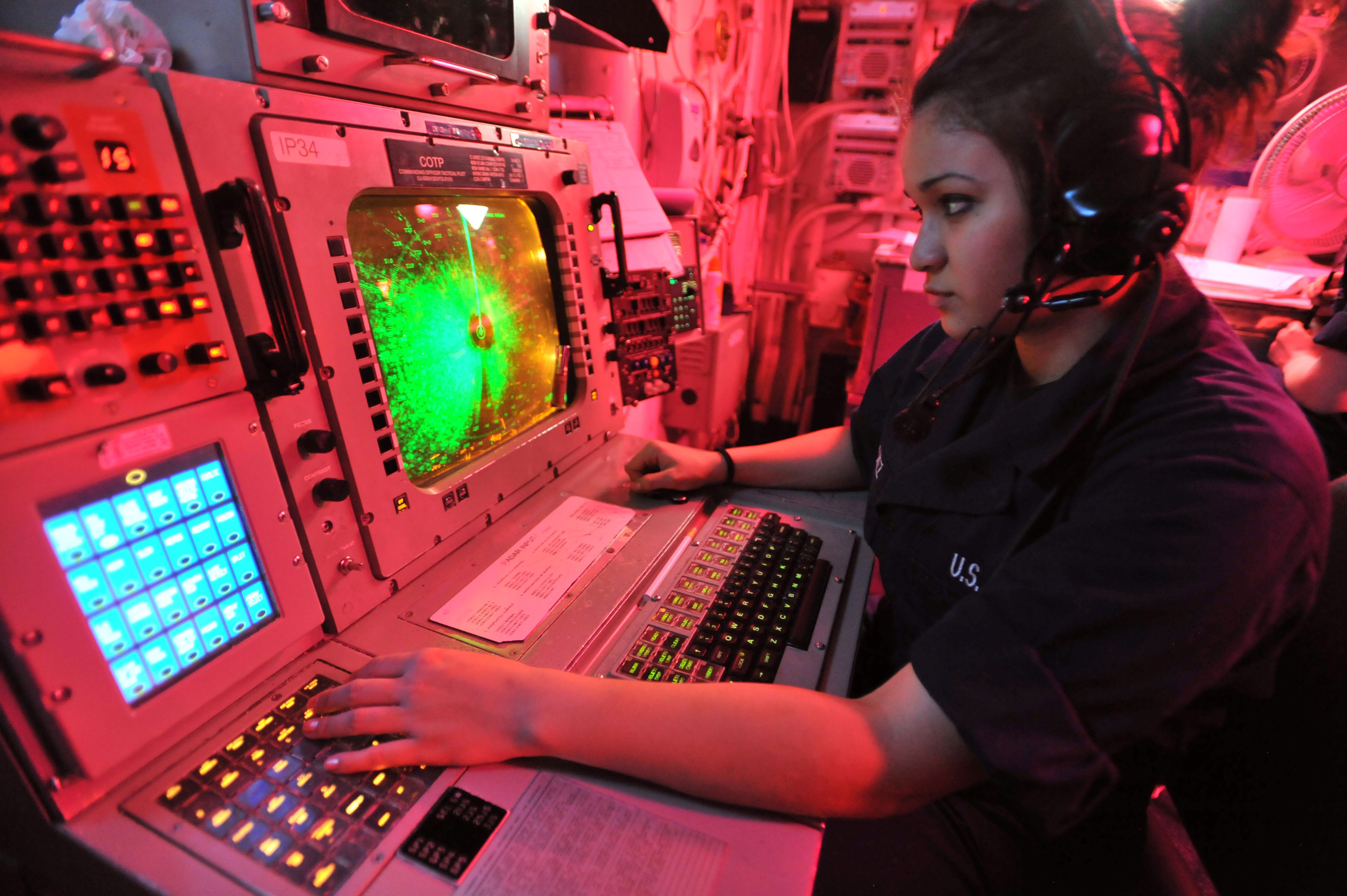
ACDS aboard a US aircraft carrier in the Persian Gulf during Operation New Dawn, April 2011

The Advanced Combat Direction System (ACDS) is a centralized, automated command-and-control system, collecting and correlating combat information. It upgrades the Naval Tactical Data System (NTDS) for aircraft carriers and large-deck amphibious ships. A core component of non-Aegis combat systems, ACDS provides the capability to identify and classify targets, prioritize and conduct engagements, vector interceptor aircraft to targets, and exchange targeting information and engagement orders within the battle group and among different service components in the joint theater of operations. ACDS integrates the ship's sensors, weapons, and intelligence sources to allow command and control of battle group tactical operations.

The ACDS upgrade is divided into two phases designated as Block 0 and Block 1. The Block 0 system replaces obsolete Naval Tactical Data System (NTDS) computers and display consoles with modern equipment and incorporates both new and upgraded NTDS software. Block 1 operates with the equipment provided under ACDS Block 0 but implements significant improvements in software capability. The Block 1 upgrade includes modifiable doctrine, the Joint Tactical Information Distribution System (JTIDS) for joint and allied interoperability, increased range and track capability, multi-source identification, National Geospatial-Intelligence Agency (NGA) based digital maps, and an embedded training capability.

== Program status ==
ACDS Block 0 was deployed in nine aircraft carriers, five Wasp-class amphibious assault ships, and all five Tarawa-class amphibious assault ships. The first installation of ACDS Block 1 began in FY 1996 with the aircraft carrier USS Dwight D. Eisenhower and the amphibious assault ship USS Wasp, followed by the aircraft carrier USS John F. Kennedy in 1999 and the amphibious assault ship USS Iwo Jima and the aircraft carrier USS Nimitz in 2001. ACDS was replaced with the Ship Self-Defense System (SSDS) Mark 2 as it was fielded across the fleet.

== Developer/Manufacturer ==
Raytheon, San Diego, California. ACDS Block I development, performance, and integration testing: Raytheon; SPAWAR Systems Center, San Diego, California; and the Integrated Combat Systems Test Facility (ICSTF) and Naval Surface Warfare Center Port Hueneme (NSWC/PHD) (Later, Combat Direction System Activity (CDSA)), Dam Neck, Virginia.

== See also ==
- H/ZKJ
- Naval Tactical Data System
- Ship Self-Defense System
