= Acacia Research =

Acacia Research Corporation
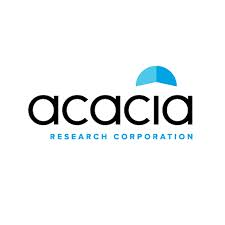
- Company type: Public
- Traded as: Nasdaq: ACTG
- Founded: 1993; 31 years ago
- Founder: Bruce Stewart
- Headquarters: New York City, US
- Key people: MJ McNulty, CEO Michael Zambito, CFO Robert Rasamny, Chief Administrative Officer Jason Soncini, General Counsel
- Website: acaciaresearch.com

Acacia Research Corporation is a publicly traded American company based in New York City. It acquires and operates businesses in industries including the technology, energy, and industrial/manufacturing sectors. Acacia has a strategic relationship with Starboard Value, LP, the company's controlling shareholder. The company has been characterized as a patent troll.

== History ==
Acacia was incorporated in California in January 1993 by Bruce Stewart and reincorporated in Delaware in December 1999. Stewart founded the business with the intention of using investment capital for innovation. In 2000, under the leadership of Paul Ryan and Chip Harris, it moved to concentrate on technology backed by strong patents. Acacia’s operations have since expanded into three verticals: Intellectual Property Operations, which includes patent licensing, enforcement and technologies business; Energy Operations; and Industrial Operations.

As of June 30, 2025, Acacia’s book value was $577.5 million and there were 96.4 million shares of common stock outstanding, for a book value per share of $5.99. In the second quarter of 2025, the company’s total revenues were $51.2 million, up 98% compared to $25.8 million in the same quarter of 2024. This was composed of $0.3 million generated by the company’s Intellectual Property business, $6.6 million by Printronix, $15.3 million by Benchmark Energy and $29.0 million by Deflecto.

The company’s principal executive office is in New York City.

On August 6, 2025 Acacia partnered with Unchained and Build Asset Management to purchase whole loans collateralized by Bitcoin.

== Legal issues ==
Four months after Apple Computer filed an antitrust lawsuit against Acacia for conspiring with Nokia to extort exorbitant revenues from handset manufacturers, in 2017 Acacia sued Apple Computer and some cellular carriers over four patents held by Nokia.

In 2022, an internal investigation by Acacia found that former CEO Clifford Press had possibly abused corporate funds. Press sued Acacia in response, demanding to be put back on Acacia's board and threatening public attacks to gain a lucrative severance package. The misconduct was confirmed in early 2023.
