= USS Missouri (BB-63) =

Iowa-class battleship of the U.S. Navy

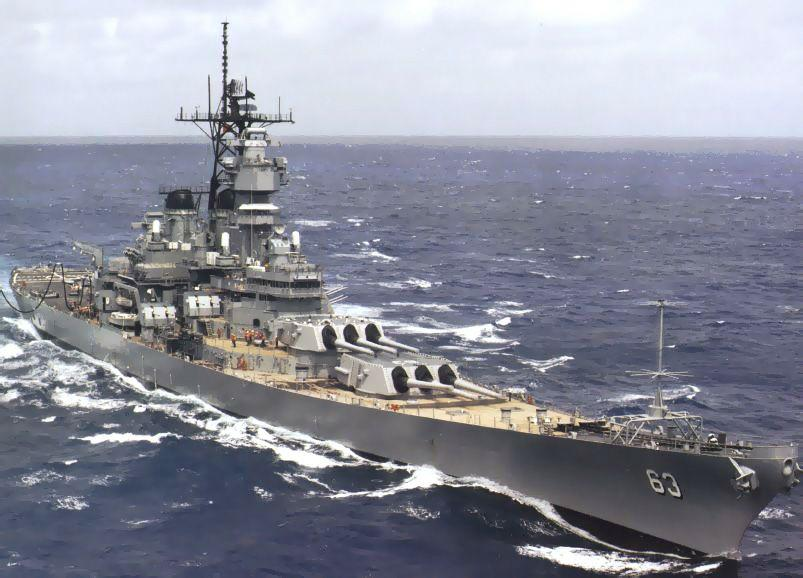
- Missouri at sea in her 1980s configuration

History

United States
- Namesake: State of Missouri
- Ordered: 12 June 1940
- Builder: Brooklyn Navy Yard
- Laid down: 6 January 1941
- Launched: 29 January 1944
- Sponsored by: Margaret Truman
- Commissioned: 11 June 1944
- Decommissioned: 26 February 1955
- Recommissioned: 10 May 1986
- Decommissioned: 31 March 1992
- Stricken: 12 January 1995
- Identification: Callsign: NCBL; Hull number: BB-63
- Motto: "Strength for Freedom"
- Nickname(s): "Mighty Mo", "Muddy Mo"
- Status: Museum ship in Pearl Harbor
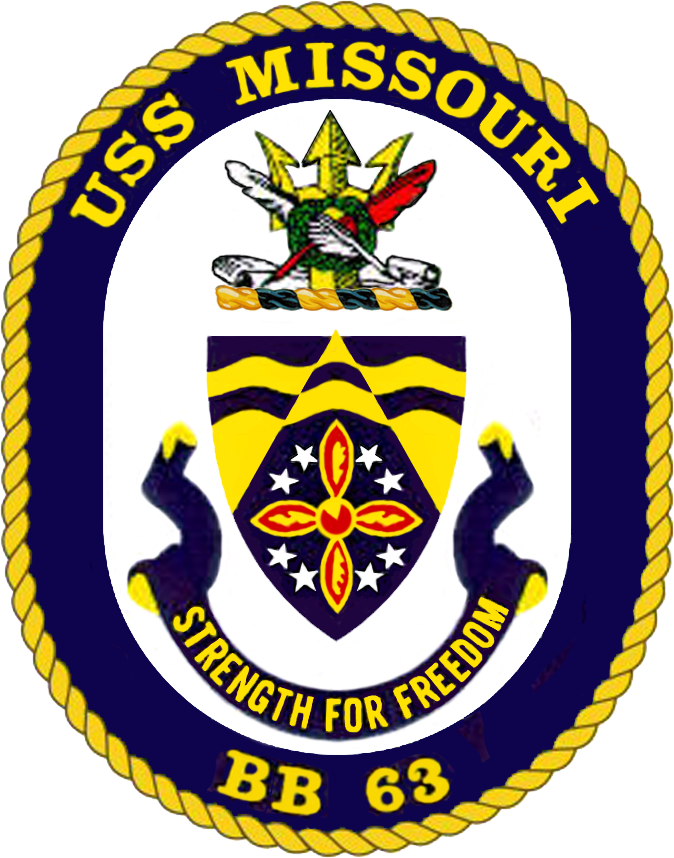
- Badge

General characteristics (as built)
- Class & type: Iowa-class battleship
- Displacement: 57,540 long tons (58,460 t) (full load)
- Length: 887 ft 3 in (270.4 m) (o/a)
- Beam: 108 ft 2 in (33 m)
- Draft: 37 ft 9 in (11.5 m)
- Installed power: 8 × Babcock & Wilcox boilers; 212,000 shp (158,000 kW)
- Propulsion: 4 × geared steam turbines; 4 × screw propellers
- Speed: 32.5 knots (60.2 km/h; 37.4 mph)
- Range: 15,000 nmi (28,000 km; 17,000 mi) at 15 knots (28 km/h; 17 mph)
- Complement: 117 officers, 1,804 enlisted men (designed)
- Sensors & processing systems: 1 × SK-2 early-warning radar; 2 × SG surface-search radars; 2 × Mk-8 fire-control radars; 4 × Mk-12 fire-control radars; 4 × Mk-22 height-finder radars; 1 × Mk-27 fire-control radar
- Armament: 3 × triple 16 in (406 mm) guns; 10 × twin 5 in (127 mm) DP guns; 20 × quadruple 40 mm (1.6 in) AA guns; 49 × single 20 mm (0.8 in) AA guns
- Armor: Waterline belt: 12.1 in (307 mm); Bulkheads: 14.5 in (368 mm); Barbettes: 11.6–17.3 in (295–439 mm); Turrets: 19.5 in (495 mm); Decks: 4.75–6.2 in (121–157 mm)

General characteristics (1986)
- Complement: 1,515 officers and enlisted men
- Sensors & processing systems: 1 × AN/SPS-49 early-warning radar; 1 × AN/SPS-67 surface-search radar; 2 × Mk-13 fire-control radars; 4 × Mk-25 fire-control radars
- Electronic warfare & decoys: AN/SLQ-32 EW suite; AN/SLQ-25 Nixie torpedo decoy; 8 × chaff rocket launchers
- Armament: 3 × triple 16 in (406 mm) guns; 6 × twin 5 in (127 mm) DP guns; 8 × quadruple BGM-109 Tomahawk cruise missiles; 4 × quadruple RGM-84 Harpoon anti-ship missiles; 4 × single 20 mm Phalanx CIWS
- USS Missouri (BB-63)
- U.S. National Register of Historic Places
- Location within Hawaii
- Location: Pearl Harbor, Hawaii
- Coordinates: 21°21′44″N 157°57′12″W
- Built: 1944
- NRHP reference No.: 71000877
- Added to NRHP: 14 May 1971

USS Missouri (BB-63) is an Iowa-class battleship built for the United States Navy (USN) in the 1940s and is now a museum ship. Completed in 1944, she is the last battleship commissioned by the United States. The ship was assigned to the Pacific Theater during World War II, where she participated in the Battles of Iwo Jima and Okinawa and shelled the Japanese home islands. Her quarterdeck was the site where the Japanese Instrument of Surrender was signed, officially ending World War II.

After World War II, Missouri served in various diplomatic, show of force and training missions. In 1950, the ship ran aground during high tide in the Chesapeake Bay and after great effort was re-floated several weeks later. She later fought in the Korean War during two tours between 1950 and 1953. Missouri was the first American battleship to arrive in Korean waters and served as the flagship for several admirals. The battleship took part in numerous shore bombardment operations and also served in a screening role for aircraft carriers. Missouri was decommissioned in 1955 and transferred to the reserve fleet (also known as the "Mothball Fleet").

Missouri was reactivated and modernized in 1984 as part of the 600-ship Navy plan. Cruise missile and anti-ship missile launchers were added along with updated electronics. The ship served in the Persian Gulf escorting oil tankers during threats from Iran, often while keeping her fire-control systems trained on land-based Iranian missile launchers. She served in Operation Desert Storm in 1991 including providing fire support.

Missouri was again decommissioned in 1992, but remained on the Naval Vessel Register until her name was struck in 1995. In 1998, she was donated to the USS Missouri Memorial Association and became a museum ship at Pearl Harbor, Hawaii, where she still sits to this day.

== Background and description ==
The Iowa class of fast battleships was designed in the late 1930s in response to the US Navy's expectations for a future war with the Empire of Japan. The last battleships to be built by the United States, they were also the US Navy's largest and fastest vessels of the type. American officers preferred comparatively slow but heavily armed and armored battleships, but Navy planners determined that such a fleet would have difficulty in bringing the faster Japanese fleet to battle, particularly the Kongō-class battlecruisers and the aircraft carriers of the 1st Air Fleet. Design studies prepared during the development of the earlier North Carolina and South Dakota classes demonstrated the difficulty in resolving the desires of fleet officers with those of the planning staff within the displacement limits imposed by the Washington Naval Treaty system, which had governed capital ship construction since 1923. An escalator clause in the Second London Naval Treaty of 1936 allowed an increase from 35,000 long tons (36,000 t) to 45,000 long tons (46,000 t) in the event that any member nation refused to sign the treaty, which Japan refused to do.

Missouri is 887 feet 3 inches (270.4 m) long overall and is 860 feet (262.1 m) long at the waterline. The ship has a beam of 108 ft 2 in (33 m) and a draft of 37 ft 9 in (11.5 m) at her full combat load of 57,540 long tons (58,460 t). The Iowa-class ships are powered by four General Electric geared steam turbines, each driving one screw propeller using steam provided by eight oil-fired Babcock & Wilcox boilers. Rated at 212,000 shaft horsepower (158,000 kW), the turbines were designed to give a top speed of 32.5 knots (60.2 km/h; 37.4 mph), but were built to handle a 20 percent overload. None of the Iowas ever ran speed trials in deep water, but the Bureau of Ships estimated that they could reach a speed of about 34 knots (63 km/h; 39 mph) from 225,000 shp (168,000 kW) at a light displacement of 51,209 long tons (52,031 t). The ships had a designed cruising range of 15,000 nautical miles (28,000 km; 17,000 mi) at a speed of 15 knots (28 km/h; 17 mph), although the New Jersey's fuel consumption figures during her sea trials suggest that her range was at least 20,150 nmi (37,320 km; 23,190 mi) at that cruising speed. Their designed crew numbered 117 officers and 1,804 enlisted men which had greatly increased by the end of the war in 1945. Missouri's crew at that time numbered 189 officers and 2,978 sailors.

=== Armament, fire control, sensors and aircraft ===
The main battery of the Iowa-class ships consisted of nine 16 in (406 mm)/50 caliber Mark 7 guns (Note: /50 refers to the length of the gun in terms of calibers. A /50 gun is 50 times long as its bore diameter.) in three triple-gun turrets on the centerline, two of which were placed in a superfiring pair forward of the superstructure, with the third aft. Going from bow to stern, the turrets were designated I, II, and III. Their secondary battery consisted of twenty 5 in (127 mm)/38 caliber dual-purpose guns mounted in twin-gun turrets clustered amidships, five turrets on each broadside. Unlike their sister ships Iowa and New Jersey that were the first pair of ships built, Missouri and Wisconsin were completed with an anti-aircraft suite of twenty quadruple mounts for 40 mm (1.6 in) Bofors AA guns, nine mounts on each broadside and one each on the roofs of Turrets II and III. Forty-nine 20-millimeter (0.8 in) Oerlikon light AA auto-cannon in single mounts were distributed almost the length of the ships.

The primary means of controlling the main armament are two Mark 38 directors for the Mark 38 fire-control system mounted at the tops of the fore and aft fire-control towers in the superstructure. These directors were equipped with 25-foot-6-inch-long (7.8 m) rangefinders, although their primary sensor was the Mark 8 fire-control radar mounted on their roofs. A secondary Mark 40 fire-control director was installed inside the armored conning tower at the front of the superstructure that used the Mark 27 fire-control radar positioned on the top of the conning tower. Each turret is fitted with a rangefinder 46 feet (14 m) long and can act as a director for the other turrets. Four Mark 37 gunnery directors, two on the centerline at the ends of the superstructure and one on each broadside, control the five-inch guns. Each director was equipped with a 15-foot (4.6 m) rangefinder and a pair of radars on its roof. These were a Mark 12 fire-control system and a Mark 22 height-finder radar. Each 40 mm mount was remotely controlled by a Mark 51 director that incorporated a Mark 14 lead-computing gyro gunsight while the sailors that used the 20 mm gun used a Mark 14 sight to track their targets.

A SK-2 early-warning radar was fitted on the ship's foremast; above it was a SG surface-search radar. The other SG radar was mounted at the top of the mainmast positioned on the rear funnel.

The Iowas were built with two rotating aircraft catapults on their stern for floatplanes and a large crane was fitted to recover them. Initially a trio of Vought OS2U Kingfishers were carried, but these were replaced by Curtiss SC Seahawks in December 1944.

=== Protection ===
The internal waterline armor belt of the Iowa-class ships is 12.1 in (307 mm) thick and has a height of 10 ft 6 in (3.2 m). Below it is a strake of Class B homogeneous armor plate that tapers in thickness from 12.1 inches at the top to 1.62 in (41 mm) at the bottom and is 28 ft (8.5 m) high. The two strakes of armor are inclined outwards at the top 19 degrees to improve the armor's resistance to horizontal fire. In general the vertical armor plates are made from Class A cemented armor and the horizontal armor from Class B or special treatment steel (STS). The belt armor extends to the two transverse bulkheads fore and aft of the main-gun barbettes, forming the armored citadel. Part of the lower armor belt extends aft from the rear bulkhead to protect the ships' steering gear. Its maximum thickness ranges from 13 to 13.5 in (330 to 343 mm) at the top and the plates taper to 5 inches at the bottom. Unlike the Iowa and New Jersey, the armor plates in the forward transverse bulkhead in Missouri and Wisconsin have a maximum thickness of 14.5 in (368 mm) at the top that tapers to 11.7 in (297 mm). The aft bulkhead is a consistent 14.5 inches in thickness, but does not go below the lower belt extension due it meeting the armored third deck protecting the shafts and steering gears; the steering gear is closed by another 14.5-inch aft bulkhead.

The main-gun turrets have Class B plates 19.5 in (495 mm) thick on their faces and 9.5 in (241 mm) of Class A plates on their sides. The armor plates protecting their barbettes range in thickness from 17.3 in (439 mm) to 14.8 in (376 mm) and 11.6 in (295 mm) with the thickest plates on the sides and the thinnest ones on the front and back. The sides of the conning tower are 17.3 in (440 mm) thick. The main deck of the Iowas consists of 1.5 in (38 mm) of STS. Below this deck, the roof of the armored citadel is formed by 6 in (152 mm) of armor in two layers. Below this is a deck of 0.625-inch (16 mm) STS plates intended to stop splinters from shells that pierced the armored deck above it. The armor deck extends aft and the roof of the steering gear compartment is 6.2 in (160 mm) thick.

The underwater protection system of the Iowa-class battleships consists of three watertight compartments outboard of the lower armor belt and another behind it. The two outermost compartment are kept loaded with fuel oil or seawater to absorb the energy of the torpedo warhead's detonation and slow the resulting splinters so they can be stopped by the lower armor belt. Behind the belt is a holding bulkhead intended to protect the ships' inner spaces from any splinters that might penetrate and the subsequent flooding. For protection against naval mines, the Iowas have a double bottom that runs the full length of the ships and increases to a triple bottom except at the bow and stern.

== History ==
=== Construction ===
Missouri was the third ship of the United States Navy to be named after the US state of Missouri. The ship was authorized by Congress in 1938 and ordered on 12 June 1940 with the hull number BB-63. The keel for Missouri was laid down at the Brooklyn Navy Yard on 6 January 1941 in slipway 1. The ship was launched on 29 January 1944 before a crowd of 20,000 to 30,000 spectators. At the launching ceremony, the ship was christened by Margaret Truman, the ship sponsor and daughter of Harry S. Truman, then one of the senators from the ship's namesake state; Truman himself gave a speech at the ceremony. Fitting-out work proceeded quickly, and the ship was commissioned on 11 June; Captain William Callaghan served as her first commander.

Missouri conducted her initial sea trials off New York, beginning on 10 July, and then steamed south to Chesapeake Bay, where she embarked on a shakedown cruise and conducted training. During this period, she operated with the new large cruiser Alaska, which had also recently entered service, and several escorting destroyers. The ship got underway on 11 November, bound for the West Coast of the United States. She passed through the Panama Canal a week later and continued on to San Francisco. There, additional fitting-out work was carried out at Hunters Point Naval Shipyard to prepare the vessel for use as a fleet flagship.

=== World War II (1944–1945) ===
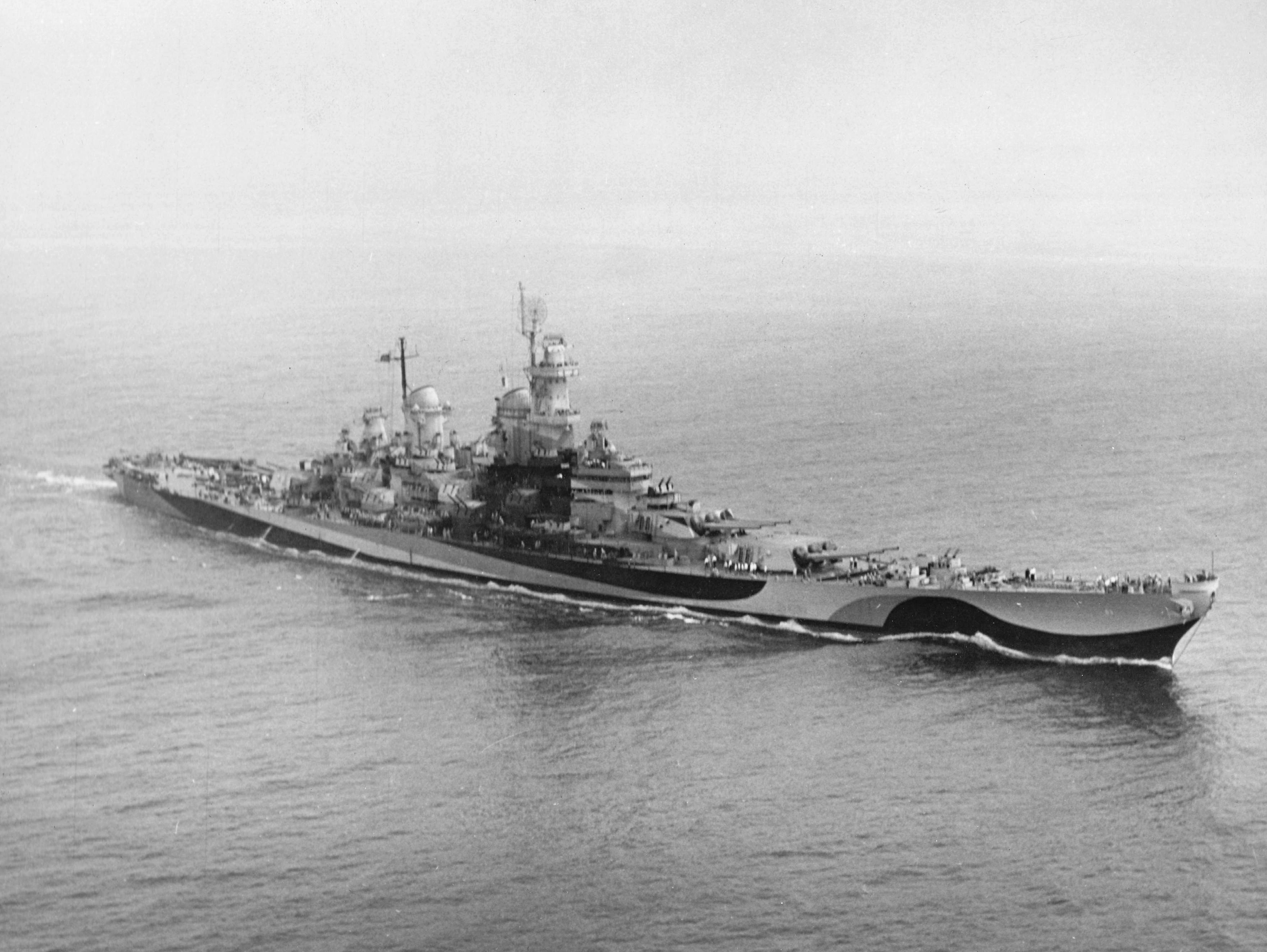
Missouri underway in August 1944

On 14 December, Missouri departed San Francisco and sailed for Ulithi in the Caroline Islands, where she joined the rest of the fleet on 13 January 1945. She became a temporary headquarters ship for Vice Admiral Marc A. Mitscher. She then joined Task Force 58, which sortied on 27 January to launch an air attack on Tokyo in support of the planned operation against Iwo Jima. Missouri served as part of the anti-aircraft screen for Task Group 58.2, centered on the carriers Lexington, Hancock, and San Jacinto, during the raid on Tokyo. In addition to guarding the carriers, Missouri and the other battleships acted as oilers for the escorting destroyers, since the fleet's logistics train could not accompany the strike force during raids.

By 16 February, the task force had arrived off the coast of Japan to begin a series of airstrikes. The fleet then proceeded to Iwo Jima, which was invaded by American ground forces on 19 February. That evening, while patrolling with the carriers, Missouri shot down a Japanese aircraft, probably a Nakajima Ki-49 bomber. Task Force 58 departed in early March and returned to Ulithi to replenish fuel and ammunition. Missouri was transferred to the Yorktown task group, TG 58.4 at that time.

The ships departed again on 14 March for another round of air strikes on Japan. Four days later, Missouri's anti-aircraft guns assisted in the destruction of four Japanese aircraft. American carrier aircraft struck a variety of targets around the Inland Sea, which prompted a Japanese counter-attack that struck several carriers. The carrier Franklin was badly damaged and Missouri's task group was detached to cover her withdrawal. By 22 March, Franklin had left the area of operations and the group returned to the fleet to join the preparatory bombardment for the upcoming invasion of Okinawa. Missouri was temporarily transferred to TF 59, along with her sisters New Jersey and Wisconsin, to bombard the southern coast of Okinawa on 24 March, part of an effort to draw Japanese attention from the actual invasion target on the western side of the island, during which she fired 180 rounds. Missouri thereafter returned to TG 58.4.

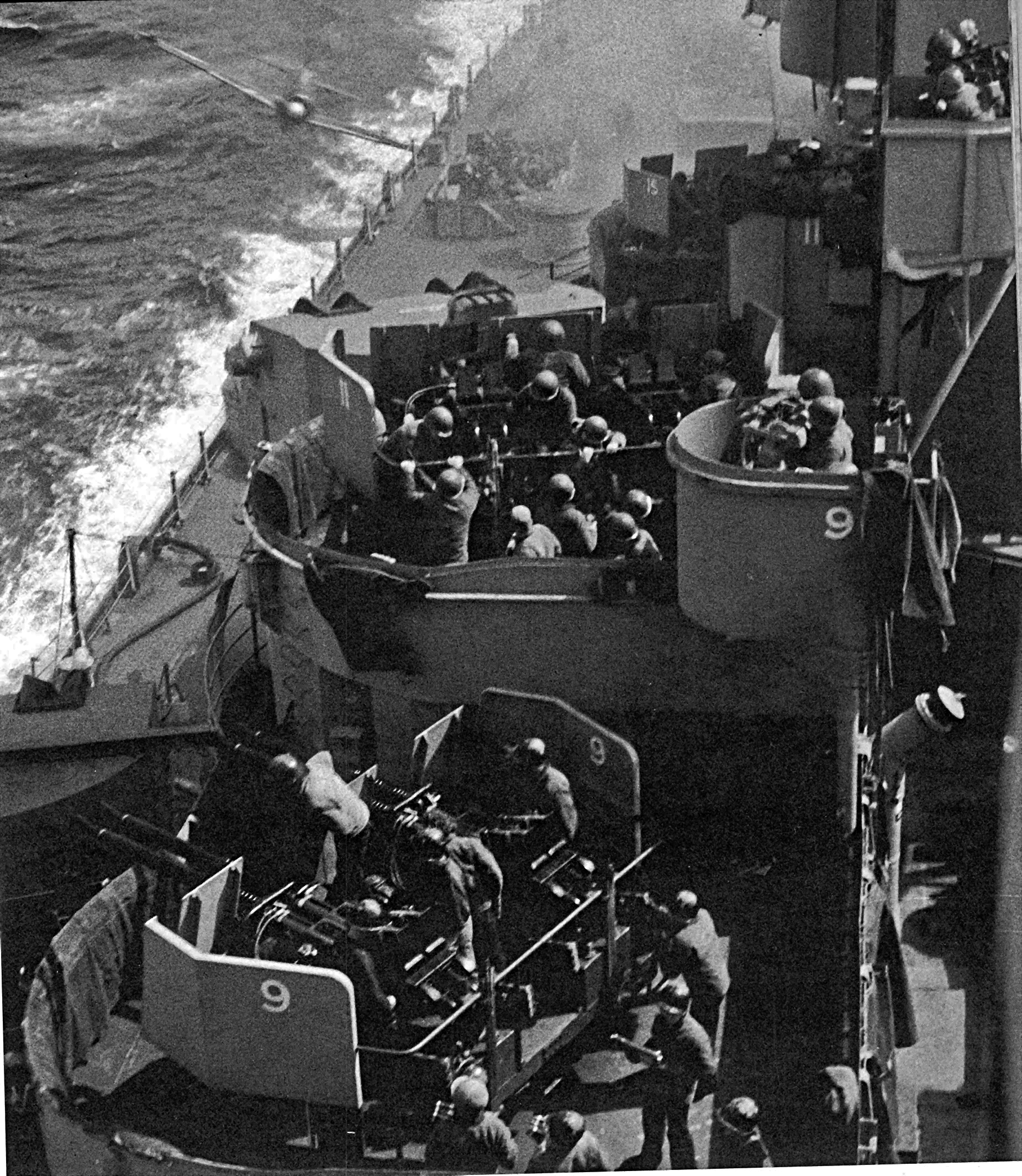
A kamikaze (top left) moments before striking Missouri's side, 11 April 1945

While operating with the carriers on 11 April, Missouri came under attack from a kamikaze Mitsubishi A6M "Zero" that struck the starboard side of the vessel below the main deck. The impact shattered the aircraft, throwing gasoline on the deck that rapidly ignited, but it was quickly suppressed by her crew. The attack caused superficial damage and the battleship remained on station. Under the orders of Captain Callaghan, a burial at sea was to be held for the pilot, later believed to be Flight Petty Officer 2nd Class Setsuo Ishino, on 12 April using a Japanese flag which the signalmen constructed themselves. Many pieces of his plane were kept as memorabilia by the crew, including Harold "Buster" Campbell, who took the infamous photograph of the attack.

Two crewmen were wounded on 17 April when another kamikaze clipped the stern crane and crashed in the ship's wake. Missouri left Task Force 58 on 5 May to return to Ulithi; in the course of her operations off Okinawa, she claimed five aircraft shot down and another probable kill, along with partial credit for another six aircraft destroyed. While en route, Missouri refueled from a fleet oiler that also brought the ship's new commander, Captain Stuart S. Murray, who relieved Captain Callaghan on 14 May.

On 9 May, Missouri reached Ulithi, before continuing on to Apra Harbor, Guam, where she arrived nine days later. Admiral William F. Halsey Jr., the commander of Third Fleet, came aboard the ship that day, making her the fleet flagship of what was now re-designated as TF 38. On 21 May, the battleship got underway again, bound for Okinawa. She had reached the operational area by 27 May, when she took part in attacks on Japanese positions on the island. Together with the rest of the Third Fleet, she then steamed north to conduct a series of air strikes on Japanese airfields and other installations on the island of Kyūshū on 2 and 3 June. The fleet was struck by a major typhoon on the night of 5–6 June, which caused extensive damage to many ships of the fleet, though Missouri suffered only minor damage. Another round of air strikes against targets on Kyūshū took place on 8 June. The fleet then withdrew to Leyte Gulf to replenish fuel and ammunition, arriving there on 13 June.

Third Fleet got underway again on 1 July to launch another series of attacks on the Japanese Home Islands. During this period, Missouri operated with TG 38.4. The carrier aircraft struck targets around Tokyo on 10 July, and then further north between Honshū and Hokkaidō from 13 to 14 July. The following day, Missouri and several other vessels were detached to form TG 38.4.2 which was tasked with bombarding industrial facilities in Muroran, Hokkaido. A second bombardment mission followed on the night of 17–18 July, by which time the British battleship HMS King George V had joined the formation. The battleships then returned to screen the carriers during strikes against targets around the Inland Sea and then Tokyo later in the month. After a brief pause, the carriers resumed attacks on northern Japan on 9 August, the same day as the atomic bombing of Nagasaki. The following day, rumors circulated that Japan would surrender, which was formally announced on the morning of 15 August.

==== Signing of the Japanese Instrument of Surrender ====
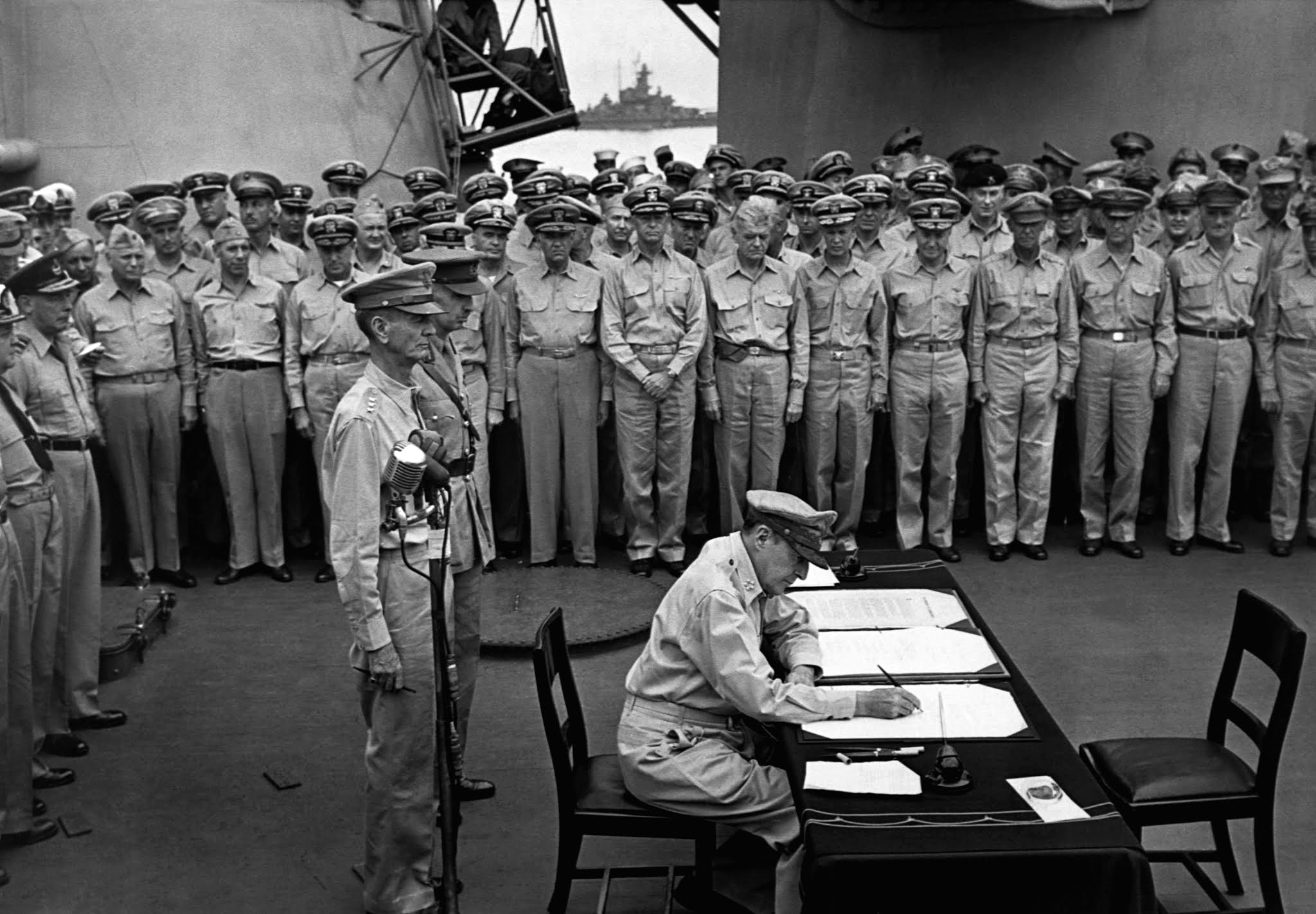
Allied sailors and officers watch General of the Army Douglas MacArthur sign documents during the surrender ceremony aboard Missouri on 2 September 1945. The unconditional surrender of the Japanese to the Allies officially ended the Second World War.

Over the course of the following two weeks, Allied forces made preparations to begin the occupation of Japan. On 15 August Japan announced their surrender and on 21 August Missouri sent a contingent of 200 officers and men to Iowa, which was to debark a landing party in Tokyo to begin the process of demilitarizing Japan. Two days later, Murray was informed that Missouri would host the surrender ceremony, with the date scheduled for 31 August. The ship's crew immediately began preparations for the event, including cleaning and painting the vessel. Missouri began the approach to Tokyo Bay on 27 August, guided by the Hatsuzakura. That night, the ships stopped at Kamakura, where a courier brought the flag that Commodore Matthew Perry had flown during his expedition to open Japan in 1853; the flag was to be displayed during the surrender ceremony. The flotilla then entered Tokyo Bay on 29 August, and Missouri was anchored close to where Perry had anchored his own vessels some ninety-two years earlier. Poor weather delayed the ceremony until 2 September.

Fleet Admiral Chester Nimitz boarded shortly after 08:00, and General of the Army Douglas MacArthur, the Supreme Commander for the Allies, came on board at 08:43. The Japanese representatives, headed by Foreign Minister Mamoru Shigemitsu, arrived at 08:56, 2 September 1945. At 09:02, General MacArthur stepped before a battery of microphones and opened the 23-minute surrender ceremony to the waiting world by stating, "It is my earnest hope—indeed the hope of all mankind—that from this solemn occasion a better world shall emerge out of the blood and carnage of the past, a world founded upon faith and understanding, a world dedicated to the dignity of man and the fulfillment of his most cherished wish for freedom, tolerance, and justice." (Note: Another U.S. flag was raised and flown during the occasion, a flag that some sources have indicated was in fact that flag which had flown over the U.S. Capitol on 7 December 1941. This is not true; it was a flag taken from the ship's stock, according to Murray, and it was "...just a plain ordinary GI-issue flag".)

By 09:30 the Japanese emissaries had departed. During the afternoon of 5 September, Halsey transferred his flag to the battleship South Dakota, and early the next day Missouri departed Tokyo Bay. As part of the ongoing Operation Magic Carpet she received homeward-bound passengers at Guam, then sailed unescorted for Hawaii. She arrived at Pearl Harbor on 20 September and flew Admiral Nimitz's flag on the afternoon of 28 September for a reception.

=== Post-war (1946–1950) ===
The next day, Missouri departed Pearl Harbor bound for the East Coast of the United States. She reached New York City on 23 October and hoisted the flag of Atlantic Fleet commander Admiral Jonas Ingram. Four days later, the battleship fired a 21-gun salute (the first of 3 that day) as Truman—who had since become President of the United States—boarded for Navy Day ceremonies.

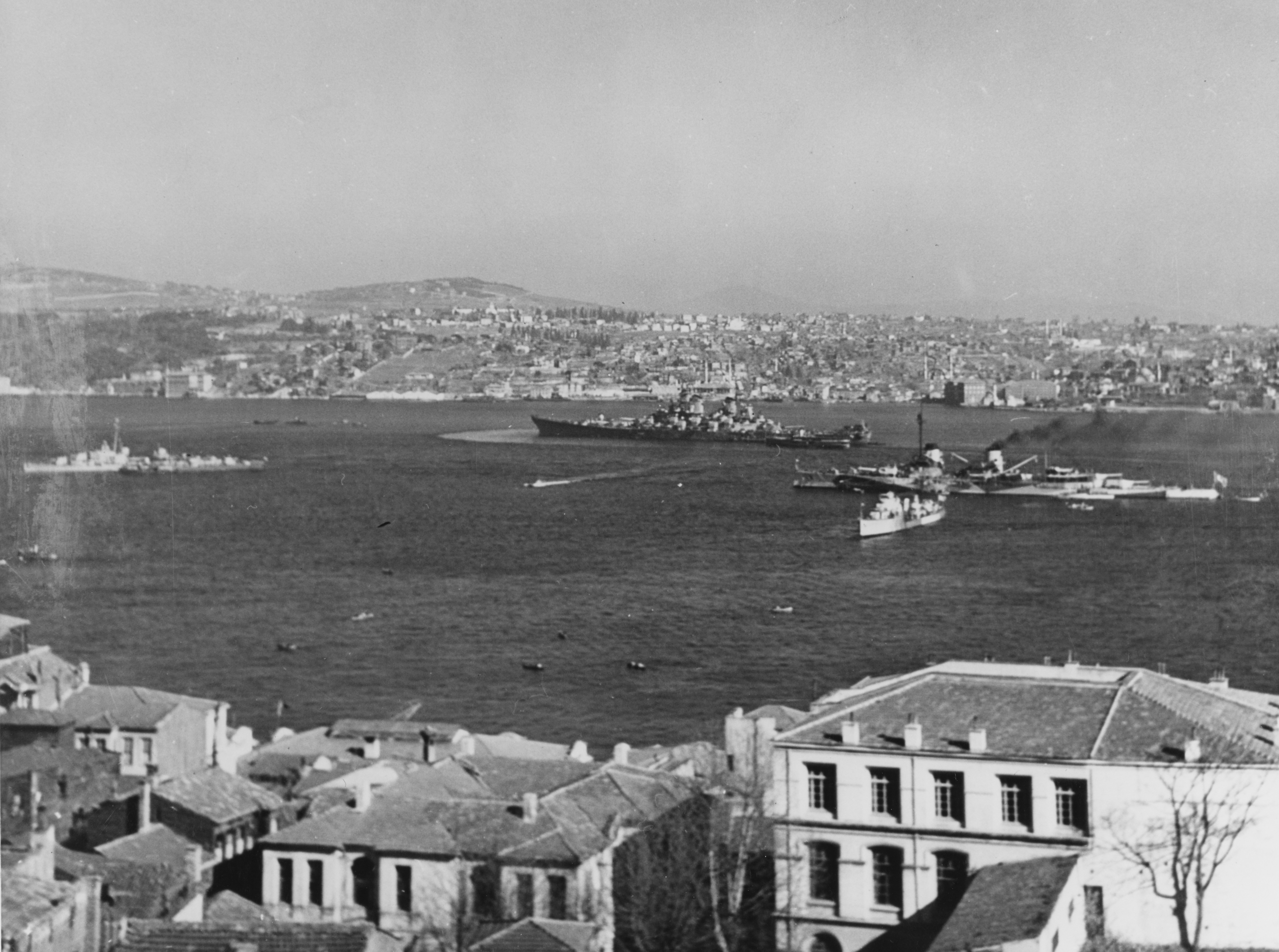
Missouri (center) and TCG Yavuz (right) in the Bosphorus, April 1946

After an overhaul in the New York Naval Shipyard that included the replacement of the Mark 8 fire-control radars with Mark 13 models, and a training cruise to Cuba, Missouri returned to New York. During the afternoon of 21 March 1946, she received the remains of the Turkish Ambassador to the United States, Munir Ertegun. She departed on 22 March for Gibraltar, and on 5 April anchored in the Bosphorus off Istanbul. She rendered full honors, including the firing of 19-gun salutes during the transfer of the remains of the late ambassador and again during the funeral ashore. The arrival of the ship was one of the causes of the Turkish Straits crisis between Turkey and the Soviet Union.

Missouri departed Istanbul on 9 April and entered Phaleron Bay, Piraeus, Greece, the following day for a welcome by Greek government officials and anti-communist citizens. Greece had become the scene of a civil war between the pro-communist-dominated left-wing resistance organization EAM-ELAS and the returning Greek government-in-exile. The United States saw this as an important test case for its new doctrine of containment of the Soviet Union. The Soviets were also pushing for concessions in the Dodecanese to be included in the peace treaty with Italy and for access through the Dardanelles strait between the Black Sea and the Mediterranean. The voyage of Missouri to the eastern Mediterranean symbolized America's strategic commitment to the region. News media proclaimed her a symbol of US interest in preserving Greece and Turkey's independence.

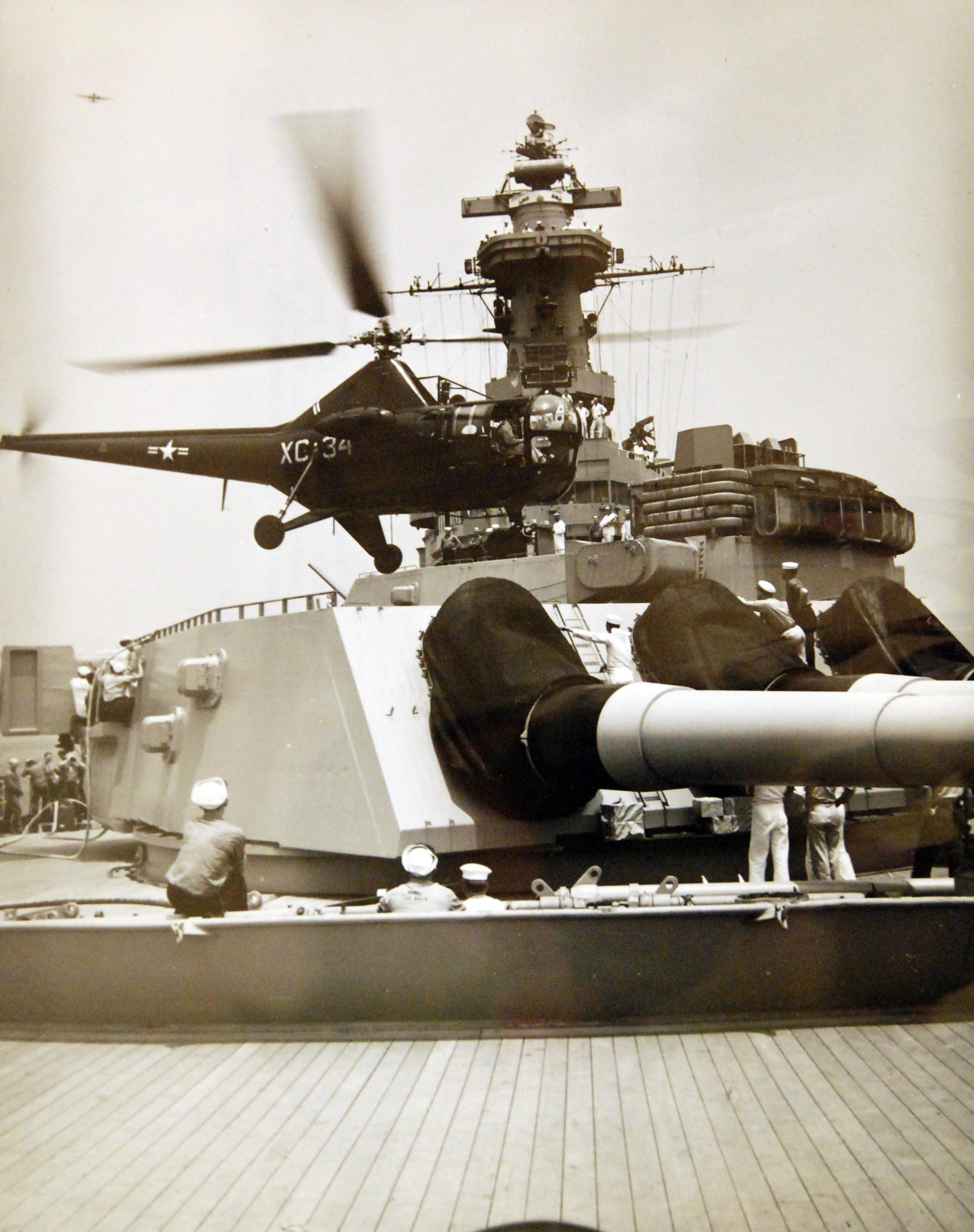
A helicopter lands on a Missouri gun turret during the 1948 Midshipmen's practice cruise.

Missouri departed Piraeus on 26 April, touching at Algiers and Tangiers before arriving at Norfolk on 9 May. She departed for Culebra Island on 12 May to join Admiral Mitscher's 8th Fleet in the Navy's first large-scale postwar Atlantic training maneuvers. The battleship returned to New York City on 27 May, and spent the next year steaming Atlantic coastal waters north to the Davis Strait and south to the Caribbean on various training exercises. On 3 December, during a gunnery exercise in the North Atlantic, a star shell fired by the light cruiser Little Rock accidentally struck the starboard side of Missouri, killing Boatswain's Mate Third Class Robert Fountain, and wounding three others.

Missouri arrived at Rio de Janeiro on 30 August 1947 for the Inter-American Conference for the Maintenance of Hemisphere Peace and Security. President Truman boarded on 2 September to celebrate the signing of the Rio Treaty, which broadened the Monroe Doctrine by stipulating that an attack on any one of the signatory American countries would be considered an attack on all.

The Truman family boarded Missouri on 7 September 1947 to return to the United States and disembarked at Norfolk on 19 September. Her overhaul in New York, which lasted from 23 September to 10 March 1948 included upgrading most of her radar suite. The SK-2 system was replaced by a SR-3 radar and both SG fire-control radars were removed, an improved SG-6 replaced the forward antenna and the aft SG was exchanged for a SP height-finding radar; Mark 25 fire-control radars replaced the combination Mark 12/22 installations on the roofs of the Mark 37 directors. After the overhaul, the ship worked up at Guantanamo Bay. The summer of 1948 was devoted to midshipman and reserve training cruises. Also in 1948, Missouri became the first battleship to host a helicopter detachment, operating two Sikorsky HO3S-1 machines for utility and rescue work. The battleship departed Norfolk on 1 November 1948 for a second three-week Arctic cold-weather training cruise to the Davis Strait. During the next two years, Missouri participated in exercises from the New England coast to the Caribbean, alternated with two midshipman summer training cruises. She was overhauled at Norfolk Naval Shipyard from 23 September 1949 to 17 January 1950.

Throughout the latter half of the 1940s, the various service branches of the United States had been reducing their inventories from their World War II levels. For the Navy, this resulted in several vessels of various types being decommissioned and either sold for scrap or placed in one of the various United States Navy reserve fleets scattered along the coasts. As part of this contraction, three of the Iowa-class battleships had been de-activated and decommissioned but President Truman refused to allow Missouri to be decommissioned. Against the advice of Secretary of Defense Louis Johnson, Secretary of the Navy John L. Sullivan, and Chief of Naval Operations Louis E. Denfeld, Truman ordered Missouri to be maintained with the active fleet partly because of his fondness for the battleship and partly because the battleship had been christened by his daughter Margaret.

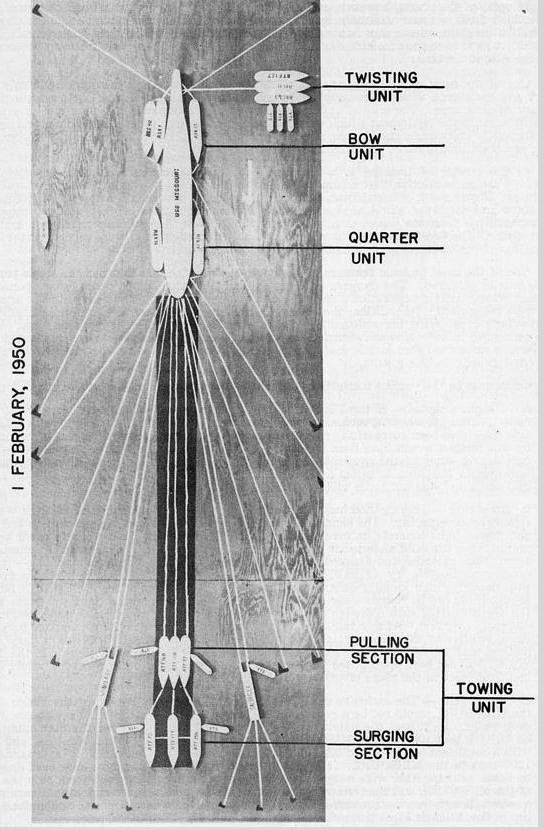
Configuration for final successful pull

Captain William D. Brown assumed command of the battleship on 10 December while she was being overhauled. Then the only US battleship in commission, Missouri was proceeding from Hampton Roads on her first training exercise at sea since the overhaul, early on 17 January 1950 when she ran aground 1.6 mi (2.6 km) from Thimble Shoal Light, near Old Point Comfort. She hit shoal water a distance of three ship-lengths from the main channel. The error resulted from a combination of many factors, including Brown's inexperience maneuvering such a large ship. The grounding occurred during a particularly high tide making the effort to free her even more difficult as did having an abandoned anchor becoming embedded in her hull. After off-loading ammunition, fuel and food to lighten the battleship, she was refloated on 1 February with the aid of tugboats, pontoons, beach gear and a rising tide.

After the subsequent Naval Board of Inquiry, Brown and three of his officers were court-martialled. Brown was relieved of command and his subordinates were reprimanded. Captain Harold Page Smith assumed command on 7 February as the Missouri's repairs were being completed. Having repaired morale aboard during his tenure as the ship was relegated to training duties in an effort to cut costs by Johnson, Page Smith was replaced by Captain Irving Duke on 19 April.

=== Korean War (1950–1953) ===
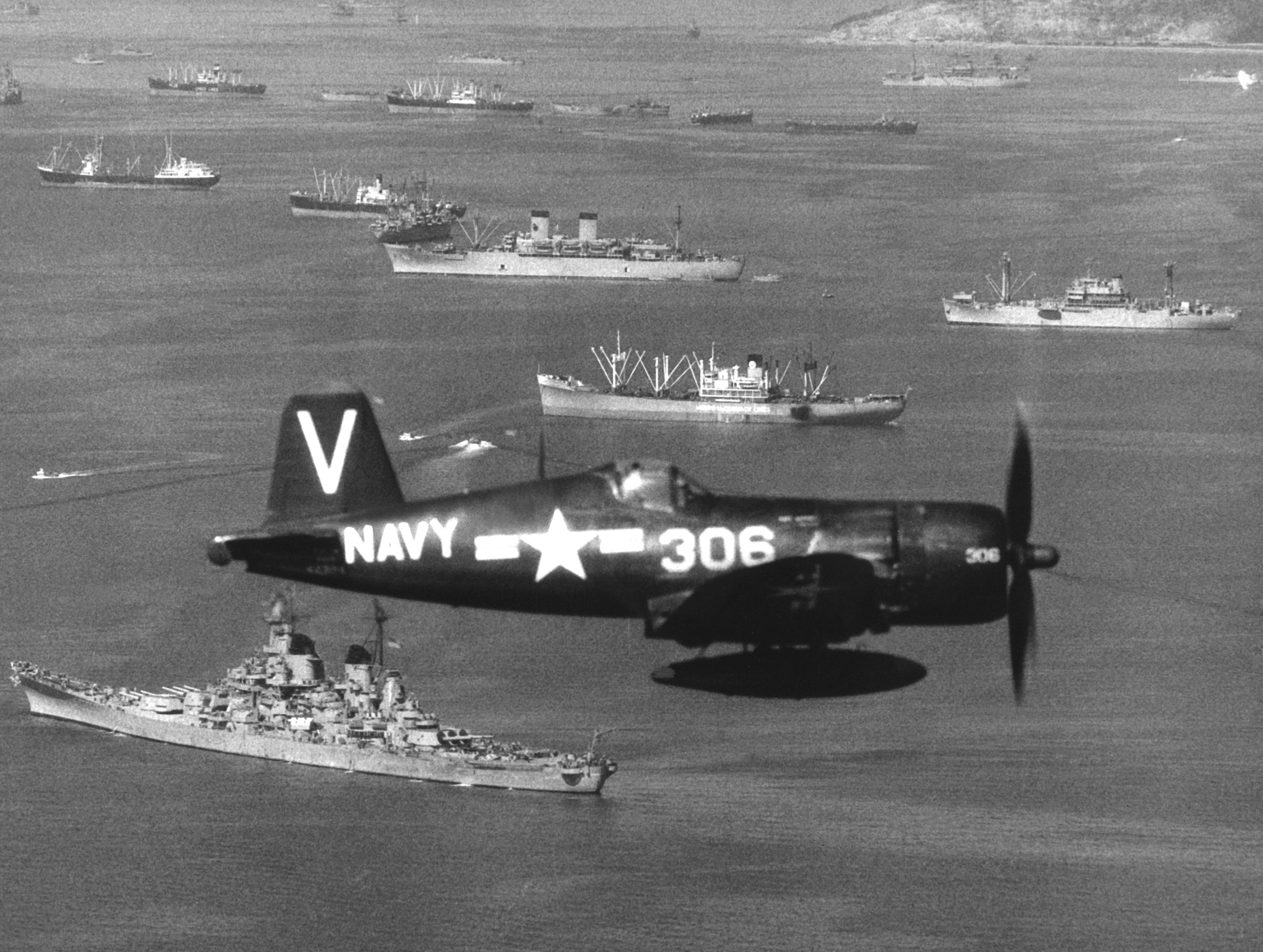
A Vought F4U Corsair overflies Inchon Harbor, Republic of Korea with Missouri below the aircraft's tail.

In 1950, the Korean War started, prompting the United States to intervene on behalf of the United Nations (UN). President Truman ordered US forces stationed in Japan into South Korea. Truman also sent US-based troops, tanks, fighter and bomber aircraft, and a strong naval force to Korea to support the Republic of Korea. As part of the naval mobilization Missouri was transferred to the Pacific Fleet and dispatched from Norfolk on 19 August to support UN forces on the Korean peninsula. Due to the urgency of her mission Duke took the battleship directly through a hurricane off the coast of North Carolina on 20 August that blew her helicopters off the stern and damaged her enough that she required nearly a week's worth of repairs once she reached Pearl Harbor.

Missouri arrived just west of Kyūshū on 14 September, where she became the flagship of Rear Admiral Allan Edward Smith. The first American battleship to reach Korean waters, she bombarded Samchok on 15 September in an attempt to divert troops and attention from the Incheon landings. After a brief visit to Sasebo, Japan, to resupply, the ship arrived at Incheon on 19 September, and began bombarding North Korean troops as they retreated north. On 10 October she became flagship of Rear Admiral John M. Higgins, commander of Cruiser Division 5. She arrived at Sasebo on 14 October, where she became flagship of Vice Admiral A. D. Struble, Commander, Seventh Fleet. After screening the carrier Valley Forge along the east coast of Korea, she conducted bombardment missions from 12 to 26 October in the Chongjin and Tanchon areas on the west coast, and at Wonsan where she again screened carriers eastward of Wonsan. During this time, comedian Bob Hope visited the battleship and gave three performances for the crew.

MacArthur's amphibious landings at Incheon had severed the Korean People's Army (KPA) supply lines; as a result, the KPA had begun a lengthy retreat from South Korea into North Korea. This retreat was closely monitored by the People's Republic of China (PRC), out of fear that the UN offensive against Korea would create a US-backed enemy on China's border, and out of concern that the UN offensive in Korea could evolve into a UN war against China. In an effort to dissuade UN forces from completely overrunning North Korea, the People's Republic of China issued diplomatic warnings that they would use force to protect North Korea, but these warnings were not taken seriously for a number of reasons. This changed abruptly on 19 October 1950, when the first of an eventual total of 380,000 People's Liberation Army soldiers under the command of General Peng Dehuai crossed into North Korea, launching a full-scale assault against advancing UN troops. The PRC offensive forced UN troops to retreat. The Missouri provided gunfire support during the Hungnam evacuation in December until the last UN troops, the American 3rd Infantry Division, departed on 24 December.

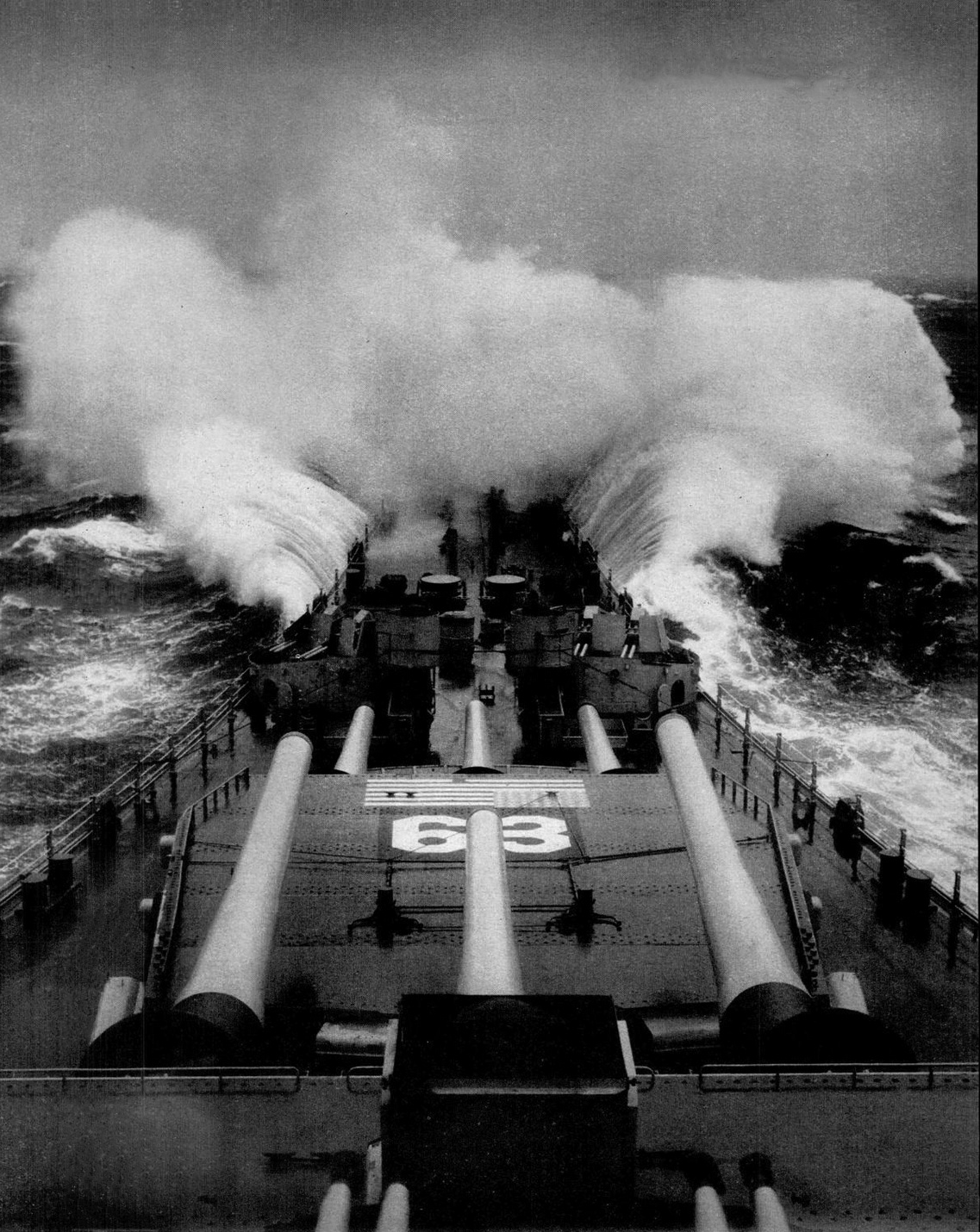
The forecastle of Missouri in heavy seas c. 1951

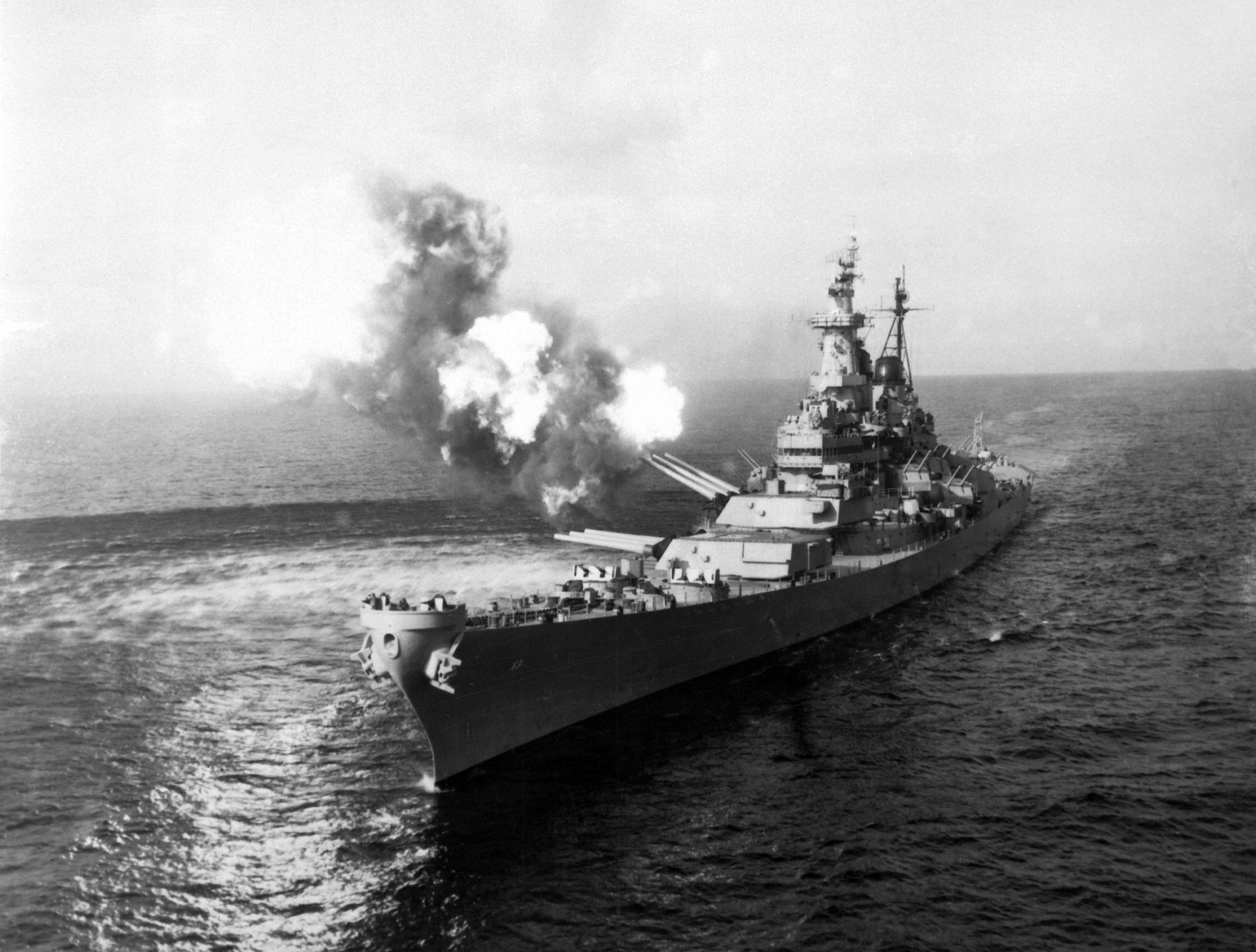
Missouri fires her guns against enemy positions during the Korean War.

In early 1951 Missouri alternated carrier escort duty and shore bombardments off the east coast of Korea until 19 March. During a visit to Yokosuka, Japan, Captain George Wright relieved Duke as commanding officer on 2 March. The battleship arrived at Yokosuka on 24 March and departed the port four days later for the United States, having fired 2,895 sixteen-inch rounds and 8,043 five-inch shells during her deployment. Upon her arrival at Norfolk on 27 April the ship became the flagship of Rear Admiral James L. Holloway, Jr., commander, Cruiser Force, Atlantic Fleet. From May to August, she engaged in two midshipman training cruises. Missouri entered Norfolk Naval Shipyard 18 October for an overhaul which lasted until 30 January 1952. Captain John Sylvester assumed command of the ship the same day her overhaul began.

Missouri spent the next six months training out of Guantanamo Bay and Norfolk and made a port visit to New York in May where she participated in Navy Day celebrations, hosting nearly 11,000 visitors. She returned to Norfolk on 4 August and entered Norfolk Naval Shipyard to prepare for a second tour in the Korean combat zone. Captain Warner Edsall relieved Sylvester at the beginning of the overhaul. The battleship departed Hampton Roads on 11 September and arrived at Yokosuka on 17 October.

Vice Admiral Joseph J. Clark, commander of the Seventh Fleet, brought his staff onboard on 19 October. Her primary mission was to provide naval gunfire support, codenamed "Cobra strikes", in the Chaho-Tanchon area, at Chongjin, in the Tanchon-Sonjin area, and at Chaho, Wonsan, Hamhung, and Hungnam from 25 October through 2 January 1953. One of the ship's helicopters crashed on 21 December while trying to assess the damage from a bombardment; all three men aboard were killed. Missouri put into Incheon on 5 January and then sailed to Sasebo. General Mark W. Clark, Commander in Chief, UN Command, and Admiral Sir Guy Russell, the British Commander-in-Chief, Far East Fleet, visited the battleship on 23 January. In the following weeks, Missouri resumed "Cobra" missions along the east coast of Korea. As part of these, the ship would enter Wonsan Harbor to bombard targets there. North Korea artillery fruitlessly engaged her there on two occasions, 5 and 10 March, as their shells were fused to burst in the air. In retaliation for the latter incident, Missouri's five-inch guns fired 998 shells at the North Korean positions. The last bombardment mission by Missouri was against the Kojo area on 25 March; she had fired 2,895 sixteen-inch and 8,043 five-inch shells during the deployment. The following day, Edsall suffered a fatal heart attack while conning her through the anti-submarine nets defending Sasebo Harbor. Captain Robert Brodie assumed command on 4 April. Missouri was relieved as the Seventh Fleet flagship on 6 April by New Jersey and departed Yokosuka on 7 April.

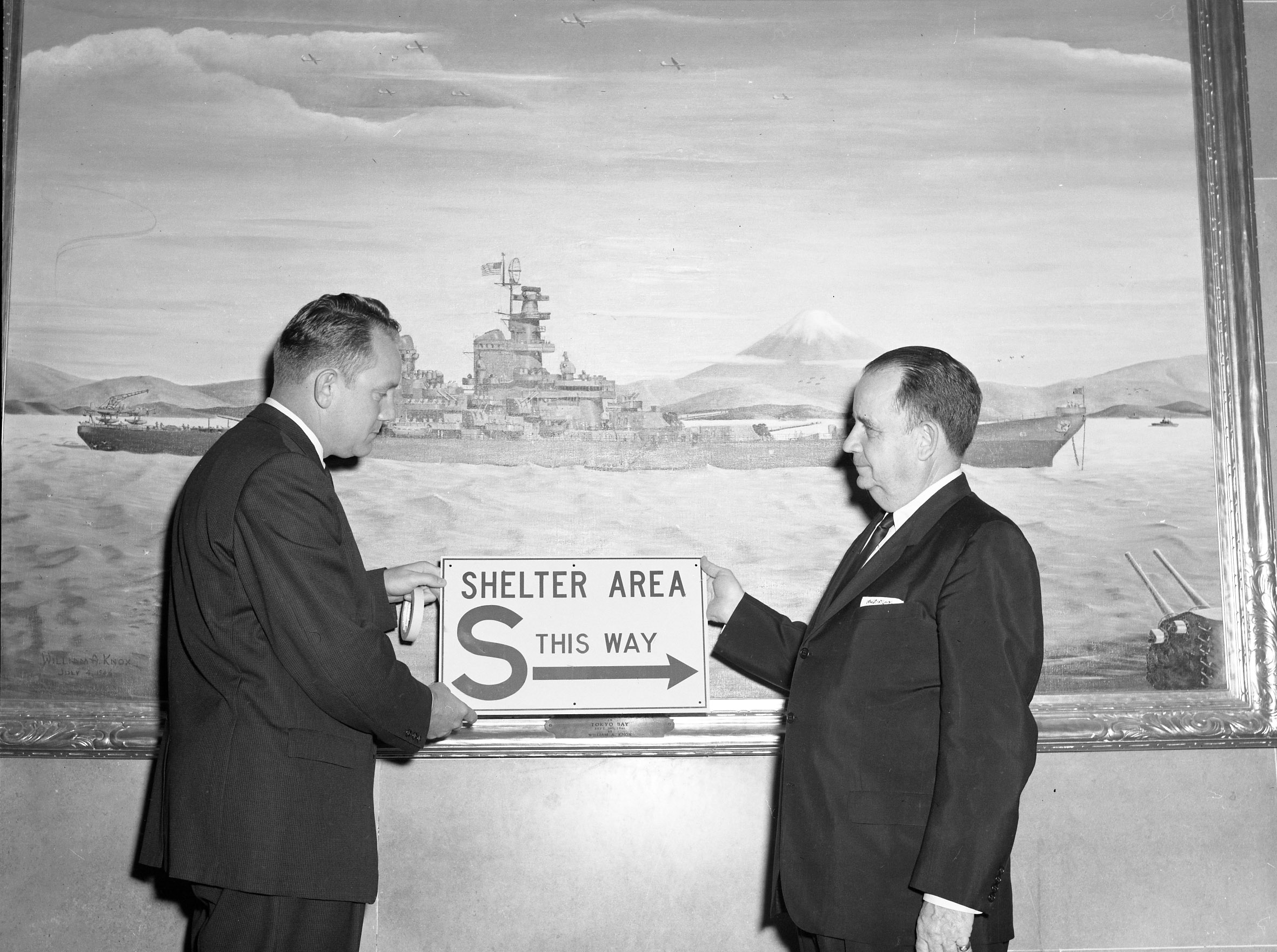
Civil Defense shelter sign held by Missouri Governor John Dalton (right) in 1963 beside Missouri painting in Tokyo Bay on 4 July 1945, by William A. Knox.

Missouri arrived at Norfolk on 4 May; Rear Admiral E. T. Woolridge, commander, Battleships-Cruisers, Atlantic Fleet, hoisted his flag aboard her 10 days later. She departed on 8 June on a midshipman training cruise to Brazil, Cuba and Panama and returned to Norfolk on 4 August. Woolridge hauled down his flag in October as he transferred to another ship; Rear Admiral Clark Green, commander of Battleship Division 2 replaced him. The battleship was overhauled in Norfolk Naval Shipyard from 20 November to 2 April 1954 that included replacing her 16-inch guns and exchanging her SP radar for a SPS-8 system that required strengthening the mainmast to handle its weight. The day before the end of the overhaul, Captain Taylor Keith relieved Brodie in command of the ship. As the flagship of Rear Admiral Ruthven Libby, who had relieved Woolridge, Missouri departed Norfolk on 7 June as the flagship of the midshipman training cruise to Lisbon, Portugal, Cherbourg, France, and Cuba. During this voyage Missouri was joined by the other three battleships of her class, the only time the four ships sailed together. She returned to Norfolk on 3 August and departed on 23 August to be placed in reserve on the West Coast. The ship hosted 16,900 people at Long Beach, but more than 20,100 visited in San Francisco. Missouri arrived in Seattle on 15 September where she again hosted visitors and subsequently off-loaded her ammunition at the facility in Bangor. The ship was decommissioned on 26 February 1955 at Puget Sound Naval Shipyard where she was assigned to the Bremerton group of the Pacific Reserve Fleet. Missouri retained her Mark 27 radar until the mid-1950s.

==== Deactivation ====
Missouri was moored at the last pier of the reserve fleet berthing. She served as a tourist attraction, logging about 250,000 visitors per year, who came to view the "surrender deck" where a bronze plaque memorialized the spot (35.3547°N 139.76°E) in Tokyo Bay where Japan surrendered to the Allies. The accompanying historical display included copies of the surrender documents and photos. Nearly thirty years passed before Missouri returned to active duty.

=== Reactivation (1984–1990) ===
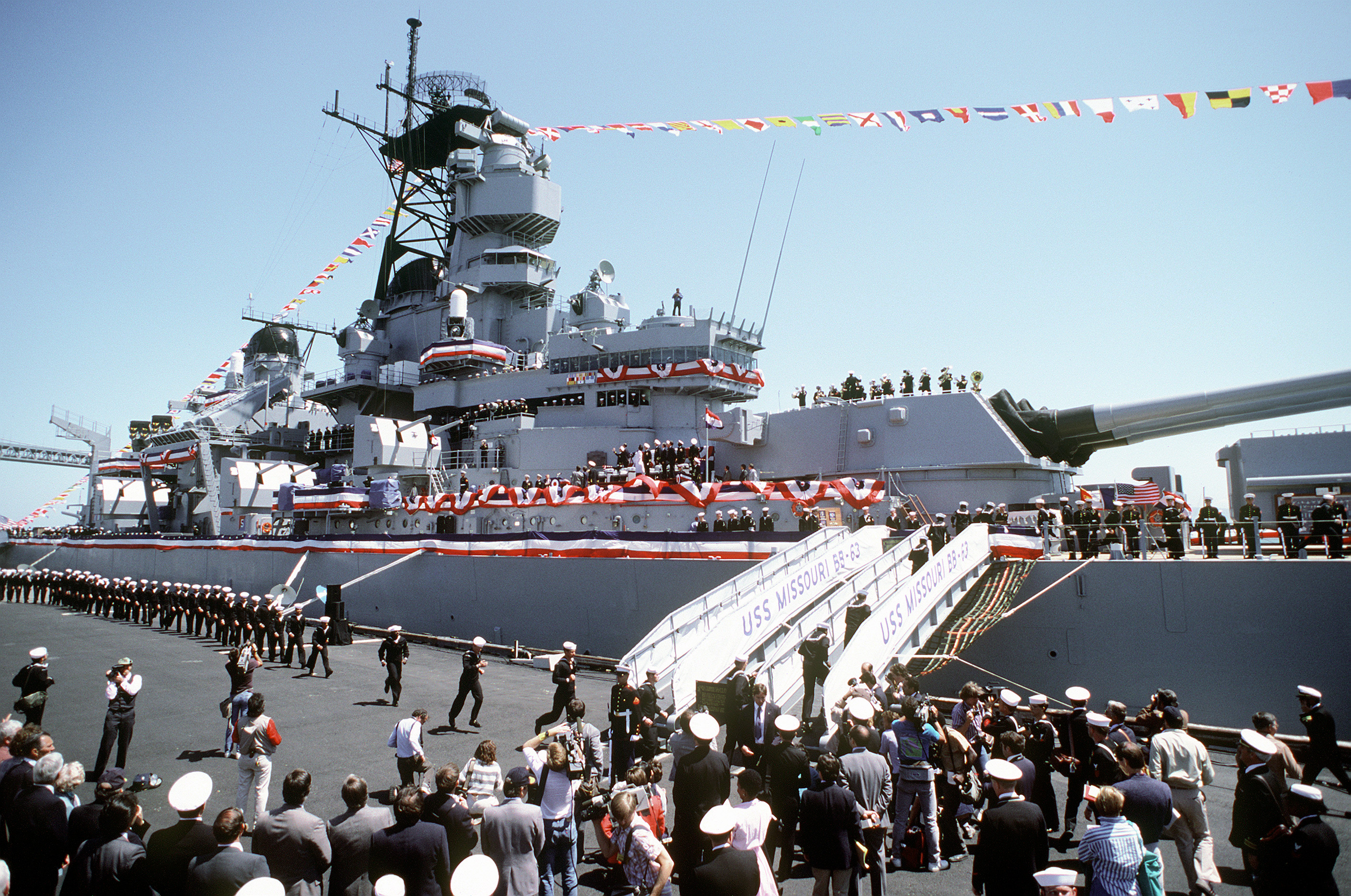
Crewmen manning the rails of Missouri during her recommissioning ceremony in San Francisco.

Under the Reagan Administration's program to build a 600-ship Navy, led by Secretary of the Navy John F. Lehman, Missouri was reactivated and towed by the salvage ship Beaufort to the Long Beach Naval Yard in the summer of 1984 to undergo modernization in advance of her scheduled recommissioning. In preparation for the move, a skeleton crew of 20 spent three weeks working 12 to 16-hour days preparing the battleship for her tow.

Over the next several months, the ship had her obsolete armament removed: 20 mm and 40 mm AA guns, their directors, and four of her ten 5-inch gun mounts. Installed in their place on the superstructure were four Mk 141 quad cell launchers for 16 RGM-84 Harpoon anti-ship missiles, eight Mk 143 Armored Box Launcher mounts for 32 BGM-109 Tomahawk cruise missiles, and a quartet of 20 mm Phalanx CIWS rotary cannon for defense against enemy anti-ship missiles and enemy aircraft. She also received upgrades to radar and fire-control systems for her guns and missiles, and improved electronic warfare capabilities. Additions included an AN/SPS-49 early-warning radar and an AN/SPS-67 surface-search radar while the SPS-8 radar and the mainmast were removed. The added missile capacity necessitated additional fire-support systems to launch and guide the ordnance. To fire the Harpoon anti-ship missiles, the ship was equipped with the SWG-1 fire-control system. Missouri was also outfitted with the AN/SLQ-25 Nixie to be used as a decoy against enemy torpedoes, an AN/SLQ-32 Electronic Warfare Suite electronic-warfare system that can detect, jam, and deceive an opponent's radar and a Mark 36 SRBOC system to fire chaff rockets intended to confuse enemy missiles. The ship's crew now consisted of 65 officers and 1,450 enlisted men.

During the modernization the ship's 800 lb (360 kg) bell, which had been removed from the battleship and sent to Jefferson City, Missouri for sesquicentennial celebrations in the state, was formally returned to the battleship in advance of her recommissioning. Missouri was formally recommissioned in San Francisco on 10 May 1986 with Captain Albert Kaiss in command. "This is a day to celebrate the rebirth of American sea power", Secretary of Defense Caspar Weinberger told an audience of 10,000 at the recommissioning ceremony, instructing the crew to "listen for the footsteps of those who have gone before you. They speak to you of honor and the importance of duty. They remind you of your own traditions." Margaret Truman gave a short speech especially aimed at the ship's crew, which ended with "now take care of my baby." Her remarks were met with rounds of applause from the crew.

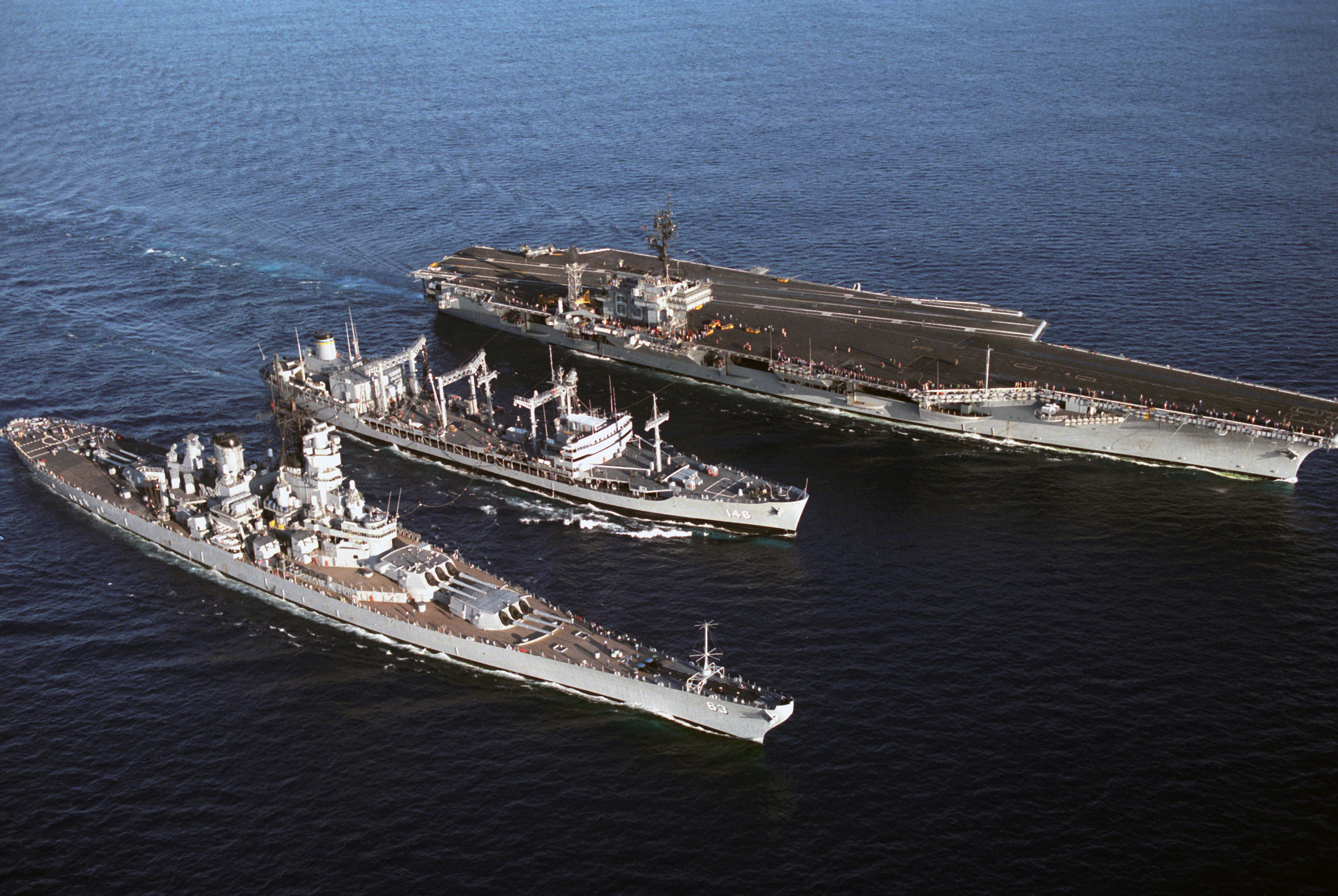
Missouri performing an underway replenishment with Kitty Hawk from the MSC ship USNS Kawishiwi.

Only briefly in command, Kaiss was relieved by Captain James A. Carney on 20 June. Three months later Missouri departed from her new home port of Long Beach for an around-the-world cruise, visiting Pearl Harbor Hawaii; Sydney, Hobart, and Perth, Australia; Diego Garcia; the Suez Canal; Istanbul, Turkey; Naples, Italy; Rota, Spain; Lisbon, Portugal; and the Panama Canal. Missouri became the first American battleship to circumnavigate the globe since Theodore Roosevelt's "Great White Fleet" 80 years before—a fleet which included the first battleship named USS Missouri (BB-11).

In 1987, Missouri was outfitted with 40 mm grenade launchers and 25 mm chain guns and sent to take part in Operation Earnest Will, the escorting of reflagged Kuwaiti oil tankers in the Persian Gulf. These smaller-caliber weapons were installed due to the threat of Iranian-manned, Swedish-made Boghammar cigarette boats operating in the Persian Gulf at the time. On 25 July, the ship departed on a six-month deployment to the Indian Ocean and North Arabian Sea. She spent more than 100 continuous days at sea in a hot, tense environment. As the centerpiece for Battlegroup Echo, Missouri escorted tanker convoys through the Strait of Hormuz, keeping her fire-control system trained on land-based Iranian Silkworm missile launchers.

The ship returned to the United States via Diego Garcia, Australia, and Hawaii in early 1988. Captain John Chernesky relieved Carney on 6 July in Pearl Harbor during the biennial Rim of the Pacific (RimPac) exercises that had begun a few weeks earlier. Other highlights during the year included port visits in British Columbia and Washington.

In the early months of 1989, Missouri was in the Long Beach Naval Shipyard for routine maintenance. It was there that the Missouri was the site and setting of Cher's music video for "If I Could Turn Back Time". A few months later she departed for the multi-national Pacific Exercise (PacEx) '89, where she and New Jersey performed a firepower demonstration off Okinawa for the Japanese and some of the other allied ships. Missouri fired 45 rounds of 16-inch and 263 of 5-inch, considerably more than her sister. The highlight of PacEx was a port visit in Busan, South Korea during which she had some trouble docking in the port's shallow water. At the end of the year, the ship visited Mazatlan, Mexico. In early 1990, Missouri again took part in the RimPac Exercise and Kaiss returned to relieve Chernesky on 13 June.

=== Gulf War (January–February 1991) ===
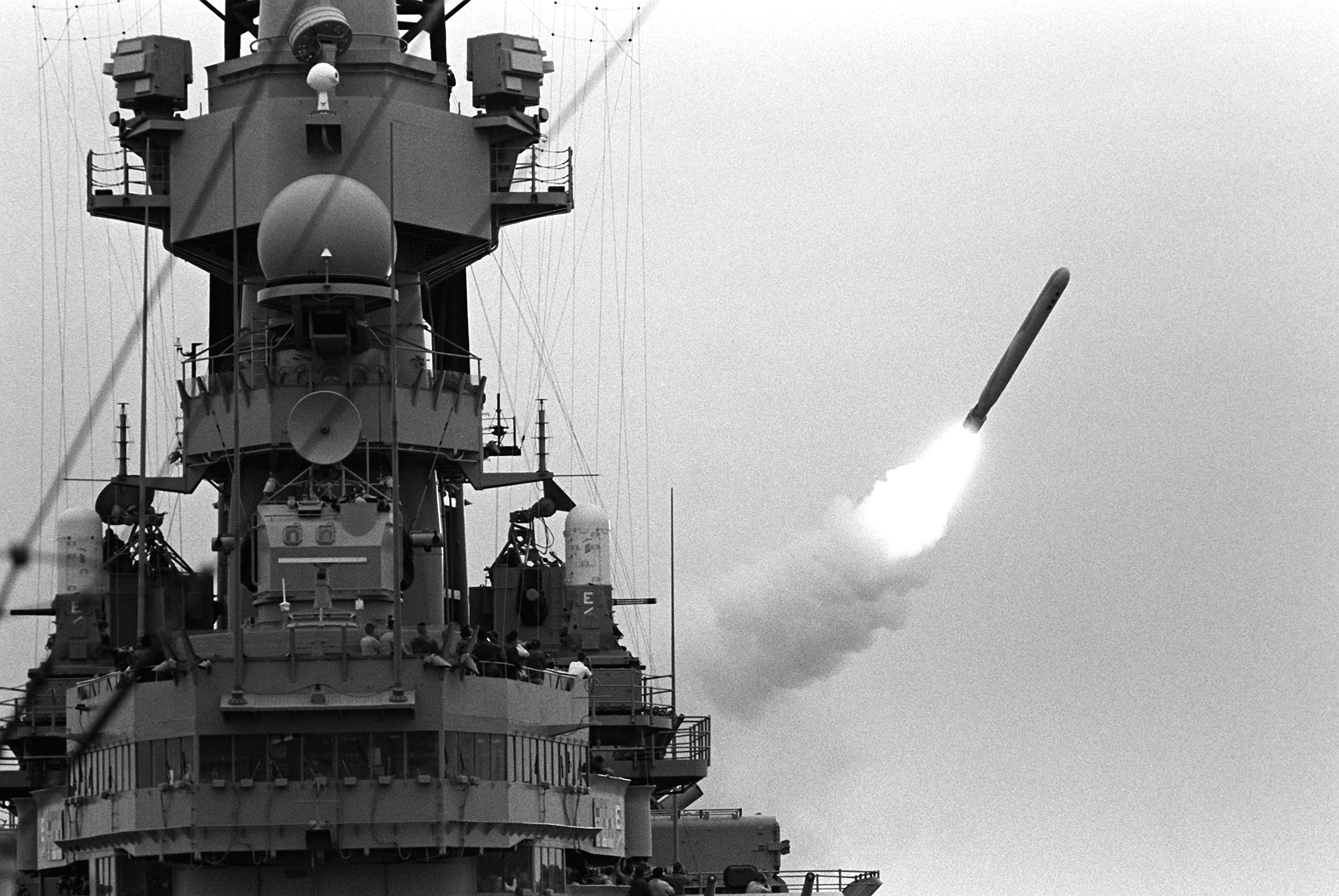
Missouri launches a Tomahawk missile.

On 2 August 1990 Iraq invaded Kuwait. In the middle of that month US President George H. W. Bush sent the first of several hundred thousand troops to Saudi Arabia and the Persian Gulf area, along with a strong force of naval support, to support a multinational force.

Missouri had been scheduled for a four-month Pacific port-to-port cruise to begin in September, after which the ship was to begin the process of inactivation. Instead, that cruise was canceled just a few days before the ship was to leave and she was placed on hold in anticipation of being mobilized for Middle East service.

As part of the preparations for combat, a detachment of AAI RQ-2 Pioneer unmanned aerial vehicles were transferred to the ship to improve her ability to direct her gunfire. Missouri departed on 13 November 1990 for the troubled waters of the Persian Gulf. She departed Long Beach, with extensive press coverage, and headed for Hawaii and the Philippines for more work-ups en route to the Persian Gulf. Along the way she made stops at Subic Bay and Pattaya, Thailand, before transiting the Strait of Hormuz on 3 January 1991. Before Operation Desert Storm began later that month, Missouri prepared to launch Tomahawk Land Attack Missiles and provide naval gunfire support as required. The ship fired her first Tomahawk missile at Iraqi targets at 01:40 am on 17 January 1991, followed by 27 additional missiles over the next five days.

On 29 January, the frigate Curts escorted Missouri northward. In her first bombardment action of Desert Storm, she shelled an Iraqi command and control bunker near the Saudi border, the first time her 16-inch guns had been fired in combat since March 1953 off Korea. The battleship bombarded beach defenses in occupied Kuwait on the night of 3 February, firing 112 main-gun rounds over the next three days until relieved by Wisconsin. Missouri then fired another 60 rounds off Khafji on 11–12 February before steaming north to Faylaka Island. After minesweepers cleared a lane through Iraqi defenses, the ship fired 133 rounds during four shore bombardment missions as part of the amphibious landing feint against the Kuwaiti coast the morning of 23 and 24 February. The heavy pounding attracted Iraqi attention; in response to the battleship's artillery strike, the Iraqis fired two HY-2 Silkworm missiles at the battleship, one of which crashed shortly after launching. The other missile was intercepted by a GWS-30 Sea Dart missile launched from the British destroyer HMS Gloucester within 90 seconds and crashed into the sea roughly 700 yd (640 m) in front of Missouri. Shortly afterwards, the battleship's Pioneer drones located the missile launchers and neutralized them with about fifty 16-inch shells.

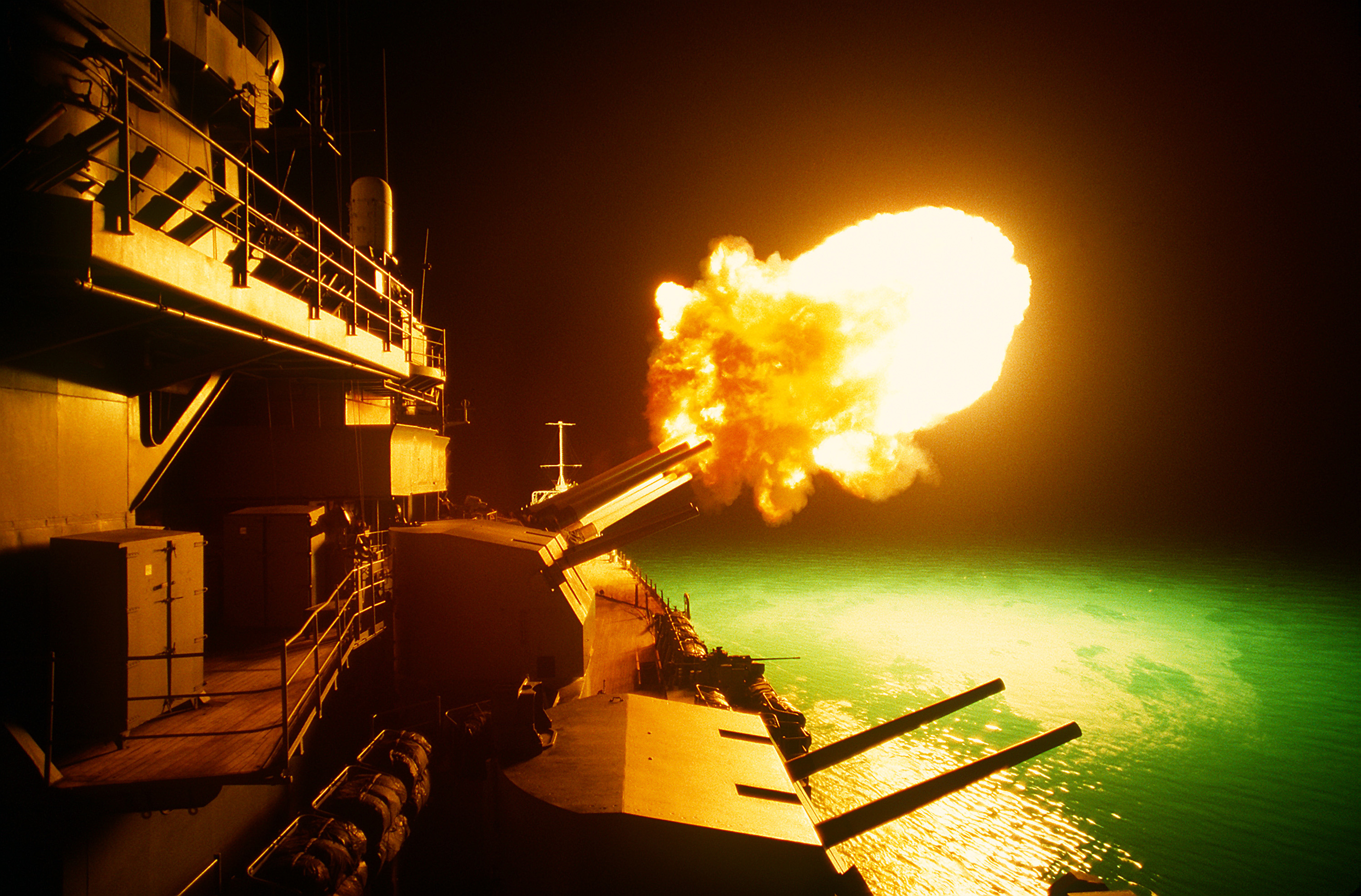
Missouri firing her 16-inch guns during Desert Storm, 6 February 1991.

During the campaign, Missouri was involved in a friendly fire incident with the frigate Jarrett. According to the official report, on 25 February, Jarrett's Phalanx CIWS engaged the chaff fired by Missouri as a countermeasure against enemy missiles, and stray rounds from the firing struck the battleship, one penetrating through a bulkhead and becoming embedded in an interior passageway of the ship. One sailor aboard Missouri was struck in the neck by flying debris and suffered minor injuries.

During the operation, Missouri also assisted coalition forces engaged in clearing Iraqi naval mines in the Persian Gulf. By the time the war ended, the ship's crew had destroyed at least 15 naval mines.

With combat operations out of range of the battleship's weapons on 26 February, Missouri had fired a total of 783 sixteen-inch shells and launched 28 Tomahawk cruise missiles during the campaign, and began patrolling the northern Persian Gulf until sailing for home on 21 March. Following stops at Fremantle and Hobart, Australia, the warship visited Pearl Harbor before arriving home in April. She spent the remainder of the year, hosting visitors in between training missions, the latter including a 7 December "voyage of remembrance" to mark the 50th anniversary of the Pearl Harbor attack in 1941. During that ceremony, Missouri hosted President Bush, the first such presidential visit for the warship since Harry S. Truman's in September 1947.

=== Museum ship (1998 to present) ===
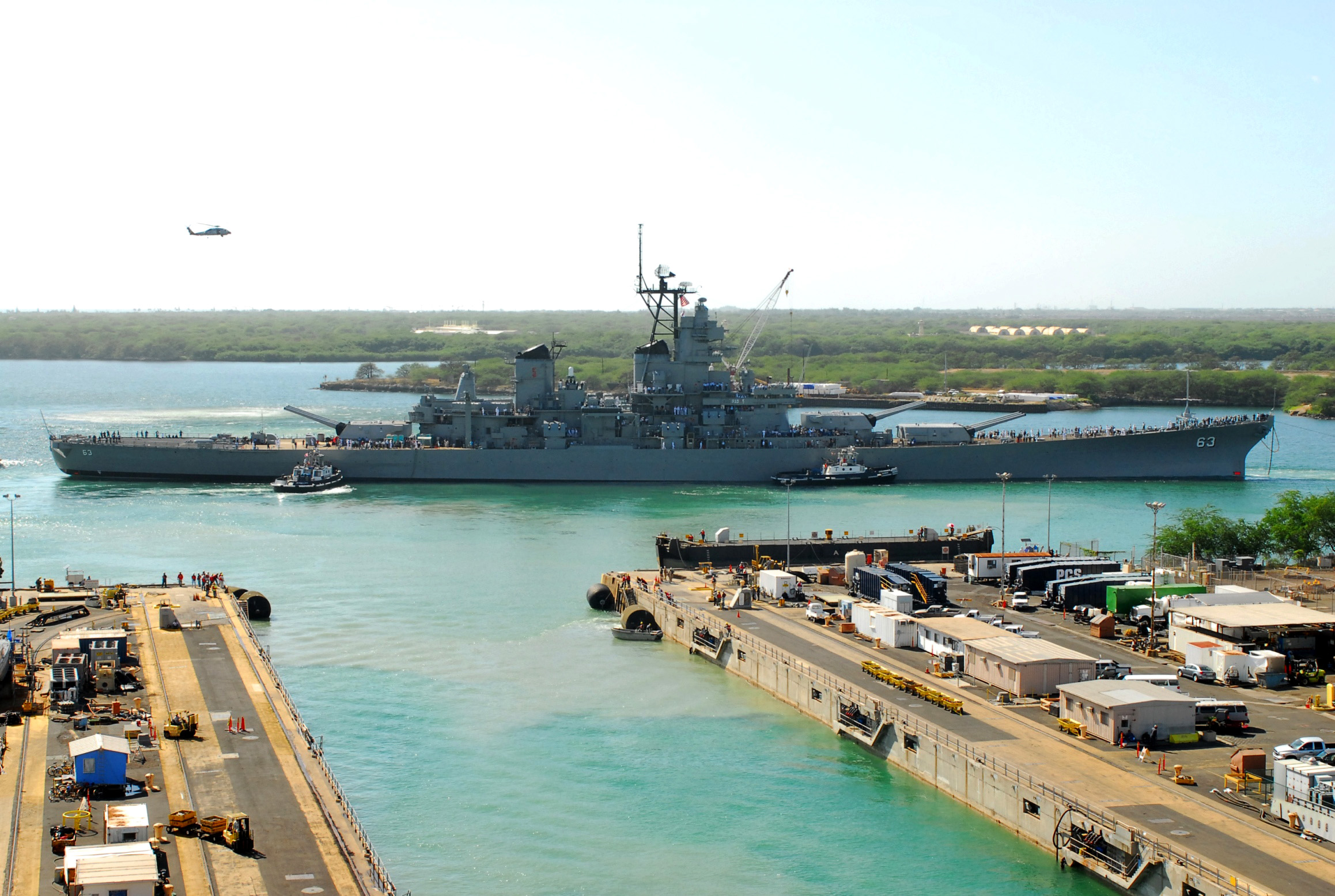
Missouri begins her two-mile journey back to Ford Island after being undocked by hundreds of Pearl Harbor Naval Shipyard workers in 2010.

The collapse of the Soviet Union in the early 1990s and the absence of a perceived threat to the United States led to drastic cuts in the defense budget, and the high cost of maintaining and operating battleships as part of the United States Navy's active fleet became uneconomical. As a result Missouri was decommissioned on 31 March 1992 at Long Beach. Her last commanding officer, Captain Albert L. Kaiss, wrote in the ship's final Plan of the Day:

Our final day has arrived. Today the final chapter in battleship Missouri's history will be written. It's often said that the crew makes the command. There is no truer statement ... for it's the crew of this great ship that made this a great command. You are a special breed of sailors and Marines and I am proud to have served with each and every one of you. To you who have made the painful journey of putting this great lady to sleep, I thank you. For you have had the toughest job. To put away a ship that has become as much a part of you as you are to her is a sad ending to a great tour. But take solace in this—you have lived up to the history of the ship and those who sailed her before us. We took her to war, performed magnificently and added another chapter in her history, standing side by side our forerunners in true naval tradition. God bless you all.

— Captain Albert L. Kaiss

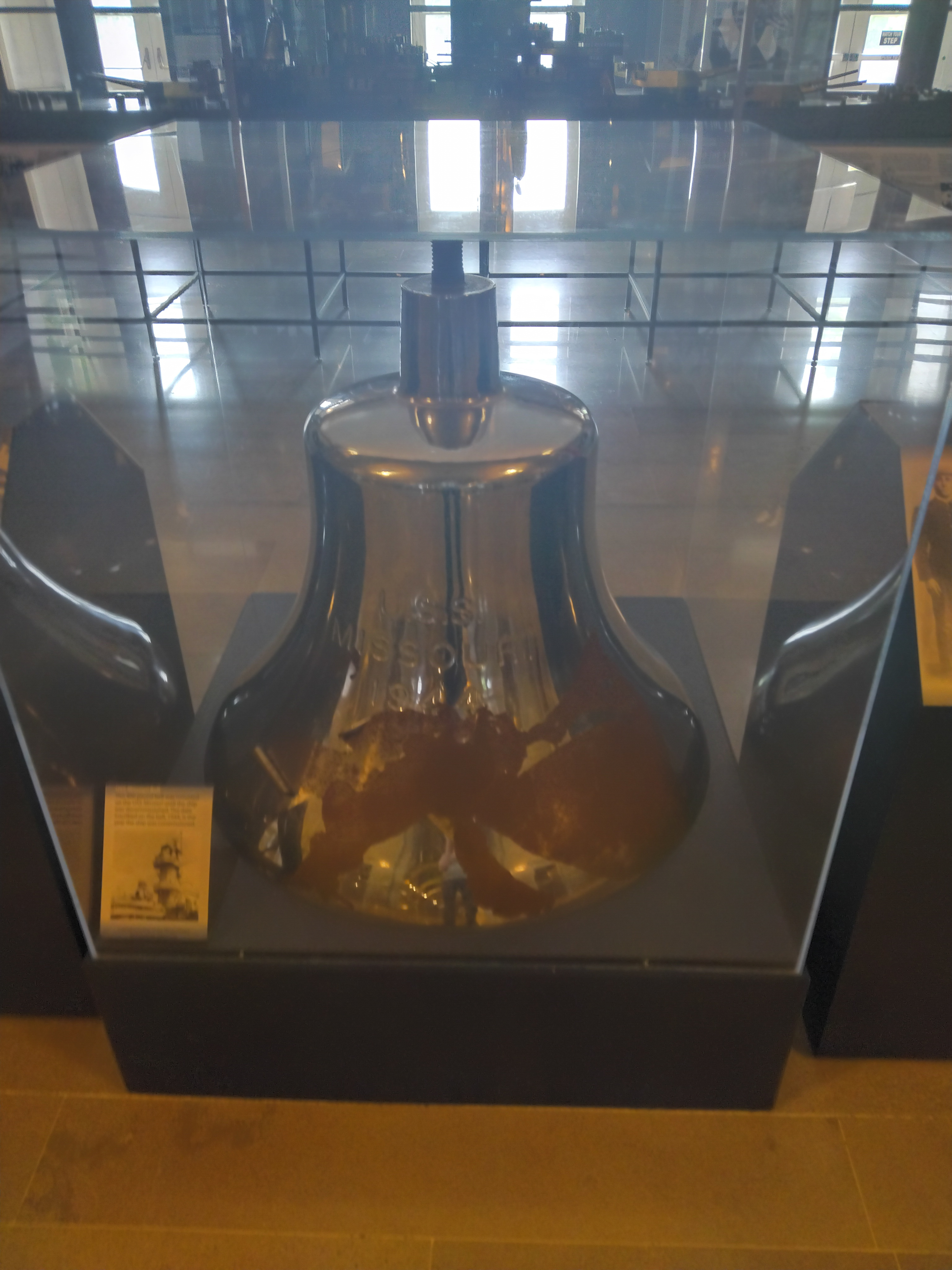
The bell of the Missouri in the Missouri State Museum, May 2024

Missouri returned to be part of the United States Navy reserve fleet at Puget Sound Naval Shipyard, Bremerton, Washington, until 12 January 1995, when she was struck from the Naval Vessel Register. She remained in Bremerton, but was not open to tourists as she had been from 1957 to 1984. In spite of attempts by citizens' groups to keep her in Bremerton and be re-opened as a tourist site, the US Navy wanted to pair a symbol of the end of World War II with one representing (for the United States) its beginning. On 4 May 1998, Secretary of the Navy John H. Dalton signed the donation contract that transferred her to the USS Missouri Memorial Association (MMA) of Honolulu, Hawaii, a 501(c)(3) non-profit organization. She was towed by Sea Victory from Bremerton on 23 May to Astoria, Oregon, where she sat in fresh water at the mouth of the Columbia River to kill and drop the saltwater barnacles and sea grasses that had grown on her hull in Bremerton, then towed across the eastern Pacific, and docked at Ford Island, Pearl Harbor on 22 June, 500 yd (460 m) from the Arizona Memorial. Less than a year later, on 29 January 1999, Missouri was opened as a museum operated by the MMA.

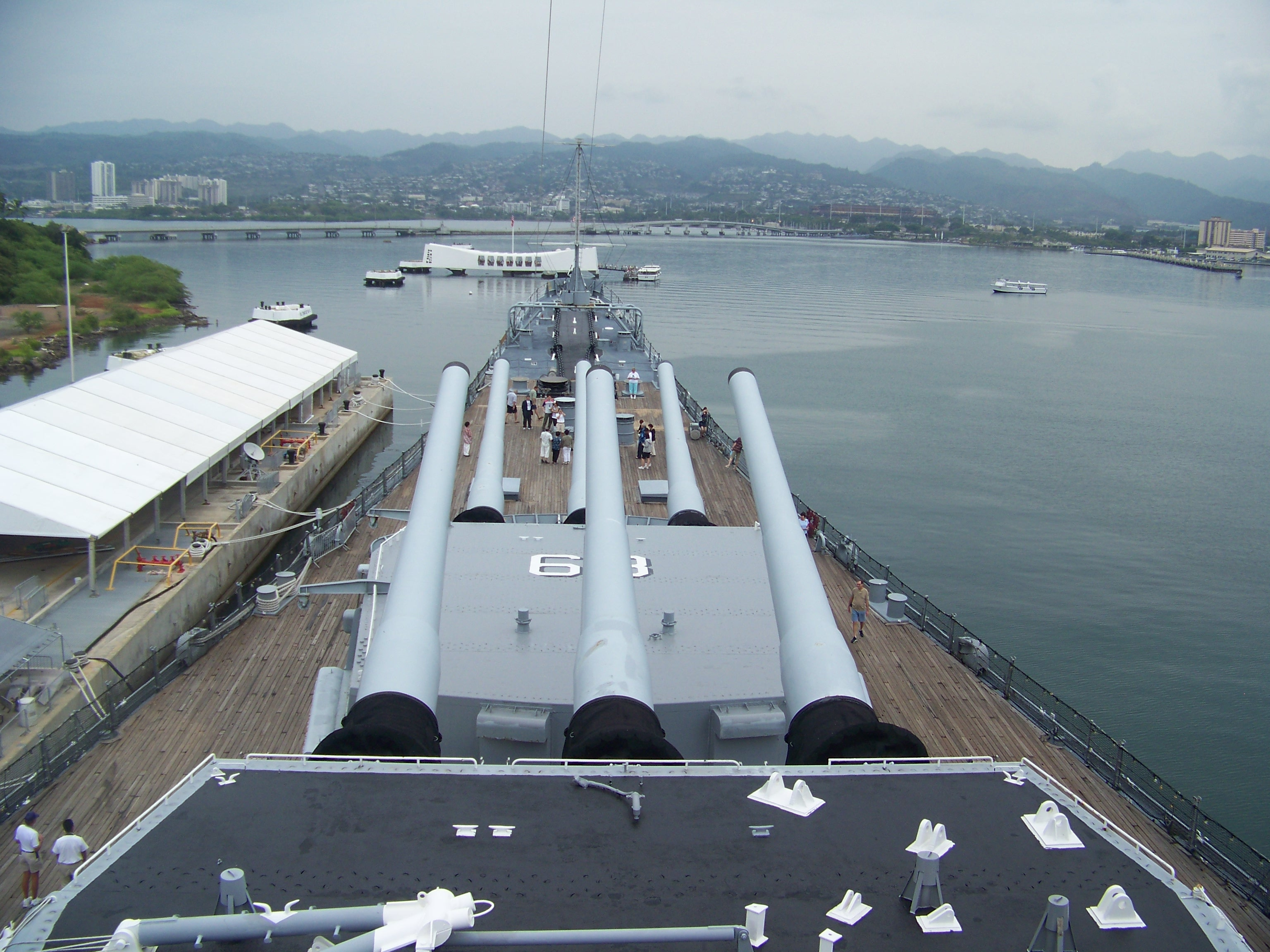
Missouri facing the sunken Arizona, symbols of the beginning and the end of WWII for the United States.

Originally, the decision to move Missouri to Pearl Harbor was met with some resistance. The National Park Service expressed concern that the battleship, whose name has become synonymous with the end of World War II, would overshadow the battleship Arizona, whose dramatic explosion and subsequent sinking on 7 December 1941 has since become synonymous with the attack on Pearl Harbor. To help guard against this impression Missouri was placed well back from and facing the Arizona Memorial, so that those participating in military ceremonies on Missouri's aft decks would not have sight of the Arizona Memorial. The decision to have Missouri's bow face the Arizona Memorial was intended to convey that Missouri watches over the remains of Arizona so that those interred within Arizona's hull may rest in peace.

Missouri was listed on the National Register of Historic Places on 14 May 1971 for hosting the signing of the instrument of Japanese surrender that ended World War II. She is not eligible for designation as a National Historic Landmark because she was extensively modernized in the years following the surrender.

On 14 October 2009, Missouri was moved from her berthing station on Battleship Row to a drydock at the Pearl Harbor Naval Shipyard to undergo a three-month overhaul. The work, priced at $18 million, included installing a new anti-corrosion system, repainting the hull, and upgrading the internal mechanisms. Drydock workers reported that the ship was leaking at some points on the starboard side. The repairs were completed the first week of January 2010 and the ship was returned to her berthing station on Battleship Row on 7 January 2010. During this period, the ship was briefly towed just outside Pearl Harbor to film scenes for the movie Battleship, marking the first time that the Missouri had seen open seas in over a decade. The ship's grand reopening occurred on 30 January.

In 2018, a $3.5 million project was completed to restore and preserve the superstructure. This included the lower navigation bridge on level four which includes the chart house, the captain's at-sea cabin, pilot house and conning tower and the open bridge on level five. On the 80th anniversary of the end of World War II, "Pathway to Peace: USS Missouri's World War II Experience" opened as a permanent exhibit aboard the historic battleship. The exhibit design was custom created in partnership with Ideum including an oral history station of eight video interviews with veterans, display cabinets designed to fit within the ship's bulkheads containing artifacts, and a large scale projection highlighting significant events during the ship's journey.

In May 2024, the Battleship Missouri Memorial announced completion of the main deck teak restoration project, completing a nearly 14 year long restoration effort. The effort involved an estimated 68,514 man-hours, and an investment of $6,193,535 to cover the costs of teak, supplies, and labor.

On 12 April 2025, a ceremony was held on board the Missouri with staff from the Chiran Peace Museum, Japanese Dignitaries, and Carey Callaghan, grandson of Captain William Callaghan, to commemorate the 80th year anniversary of the burial at sea for the Kamikaze pilot that struck Missouri off Okinawa in 1945. The ceremony included a Three-volley salute by Marines, as well as the playing of Taps, and a final wreath laying ceremony over the location where the dent from the attack can still be seen.

== Awards ==
Missouri earned three battle stars for World War II service, five for Korean War service and further three for Gulf War service. She has also earned the following awards:

1st row	Combat Action Ribbon	Navy Unit Commendation

2nd row	Meritorious Unit Commendation	Navy "E" Ribbon with Wreathed Battle E device	China Service Medal
3rd row	American Campaign Medal	Asiatic-Pacific Campaign Medal with three campaign stars	World War II Victory Medal
4th row	Navy Occupation Service Medal	National Defense Service Medal with service star	Korean Service Medal with silver service star (5 campaigns)
5th row	Armed Forces Expeditionary Medal	Southwest Asia Service Medal with two campaign stars	Sea Service Deployment Ribbon with two service stars
6th row	Republic of Korea Presidential Unit Citation	United Nations Service Medal	Liberation of Kuwait Medal

== Appearances in popular culture ==
Cher asked to film her 1989 music video of her song "If I Could Turn Back Time" aboard a US Navy ship and the Navy's Office of Information in Washington approved. The Navy intended to have it filmed aboard New Jersey because Missouri would be at sea at the planned time. Missouri's information officer told the producer: "We're the most historic battleship in the world. This is where World War II ended. You want to do it on here." Cher changed her schedule so that it could be filmed aboard Missouri. The performance was filmed over the 4th of July weekend. "The production people did a spectacular job of rigging the ship with lights; The battleship became a dramatic stage for the...video." Her performance was racier than expected with her wearing a very revealing costume and straddling one of the 16-inch guns during a part of the performance. The video was mostly well received, especially by the crew, but the Navy received some complaints. Columnist Jack Anderson wrote "If battleships could blush, the USS Missouri would be bright red". Afterwards, Missouri's captain directed that the song be played when the ship was conducting underway replenishments with other ships.

Missouri was central to the plot of the 1992 film Under Siege, though many of the on-ship scenes were shot aboard the similar but older battleship USS Alabama. Exterior footage of the Missouri at sea would also be used to represent the sister ship USS Iowa for the 2001 film A Glimpse Of Hell. The ship plays a significant role in the final act of the 2008 stealth action game Metal Gear Solid 4: Guns of the Patriots. The ship was also prominently featured in the 2012 sci-fi action film Battleship. As Missouri has not moved under her own power since 1992, shots of the ship at sea were obtained with the help of three tugboats. Missouri would also feature a brief appearance in the climax of the 2016 historical war drama Hacksaw Ridge. In reality, she would not be present for the battle and was escorting the Task Force 58 carrier screen, only returning to bombardment missions on Okinawa after the battle had concluded.

== See also ==
- List of broadsides of major World War II ships
- List of museum ships
- U.S. Navy memorials
- U.S. Navy museums (and other battleship museums)

== Bibliography ==
- Butler, John (1995). Strike Able-Peter: The Stranding and Salvage of the USS Missouri. Annapolis, Maryland: Naval Institute Press. ISBN 1-55750-094-0.
- Draminski, Stefan (2020). The Battleship USS Iowa. Oxford, UK: Osprey Publishing. ISBN 978-1-4728-2729-6.
- Friedman, Norman (1985). U.S. Battleships: An Illustrated Design History. Annapolis, Maryland: Naval Institute Press. ISBN 0-87021-715-1.
- Friedman, Norman (1980). "United States of America". In Chesneau, Roger (ed.). Conway's All the World's Fighting Ships 1922–1946. New York: Mayflower Books. pp. 86–166. ISBN 0-8317-0303-2.
- Kaplan, Philip (2004). Battleship. London: Aurum Press. ISBN 1-85410-902-2.
- "Missouri III (BB-63) 1944–1995". Dictionary of American Naval Fighting Ships. US Navy History and Heritage Command. 24 June 2019.
- Man of War: Log of the United States Heavy Cruiser Louisville. The Dunlap Printing Co. 1946.
- Polmar, Norman (2001). The Naval Institute Guide to the Ships and Aircraft of the U.S. Fleet. Annapolis, Maryland: Naval Institute Press. ISBN 1-55750-656-6.
- Rohwer, Jürgen (2005). Chronology of the War at Sea, 1939–1945: The Naval History of World War Two (3rd rev. ed.). Annapolis, Maryland: Naval Institute Press. ISBN 1-59114-119-2.
- Sharpe, Richard (1991). Jane's Fighting Ships 1991–92. London: Bulter & Tanner. ISBN 0-7106-0960-4.
- Stillwell, Paul (1996). Battleship Missouri: An Illustrated History. Annapolis, Maryland: Naval Institute Press. ISBN 1-55750-780-5.
- Sumrall, Robert F. (1988). Iowa Class Battleships: Their Design, Weapons, and Equipment. Annapolis, Maryland: Naval Institute Press. ISBN 0-87021-298-2.
