= Beach gear (ship salvage) =

Beach gear is equipment and methods that place anchoring on land or in the water to exert pulling forces to salvage a stranded ship.

== Methods ==
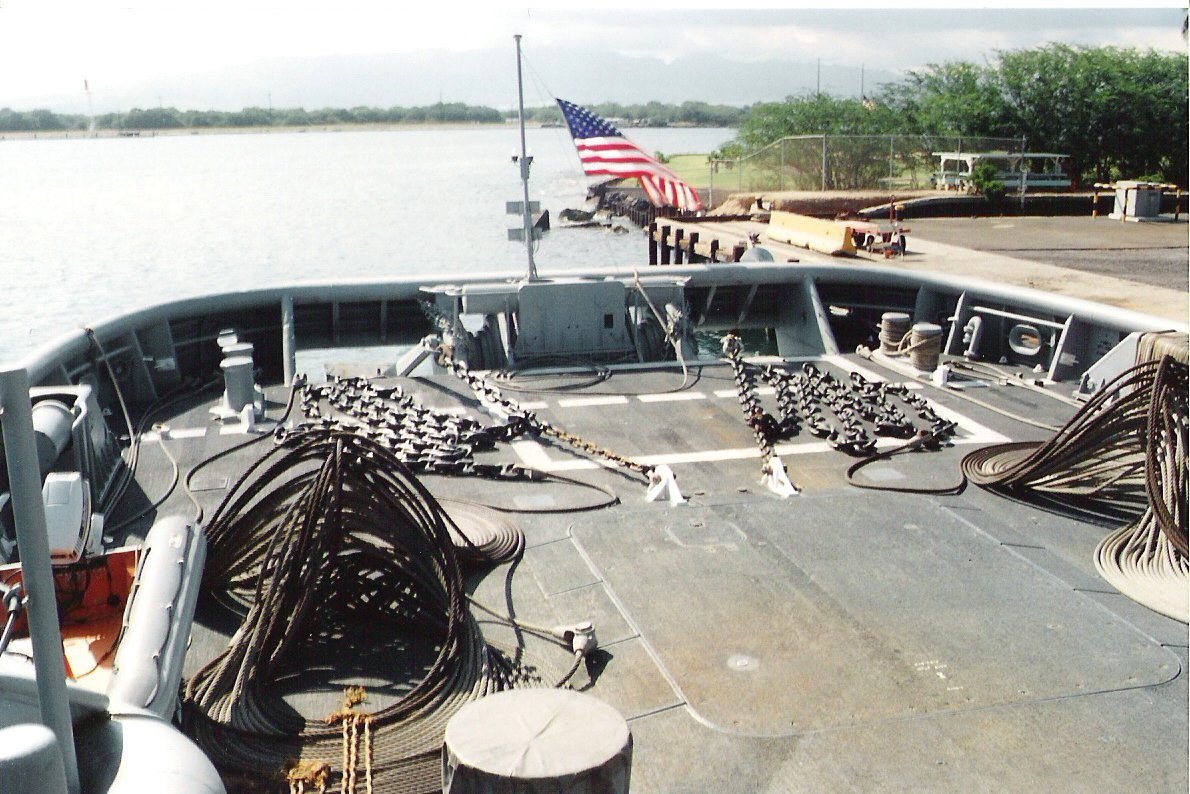
Example of beach gear

A common form of beach gear is to embed ship anchors on land or in water and attach them by cables, chains or ropes to other boats or ships. These can be attached to tugboats to increase their pulling power or to the stranded ship for pulling using its own winches. US Navy standard beach gear is a ground tackle system consisting of anchors, chain, wire rope and heaving equipment. It is an engineered system designed to be used for developing a pulling force of up to 60 tons to retract stranded ships.

== Examples ==
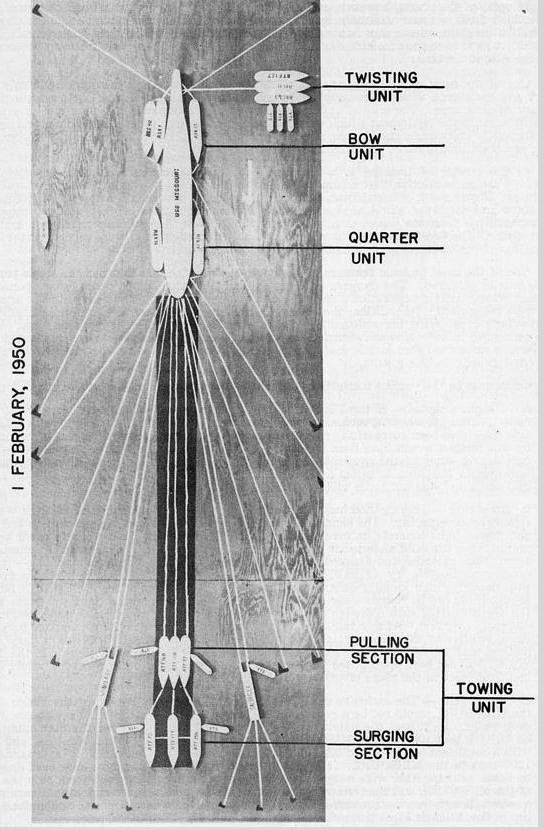
Beach gear (17 sets) in 1950 USS Missouri un-grounding configuration

17 sets of heavy beach gear were utilized help un-ground the USS Missouri in 1950. A typical set included:

- Crown buoy and recovery wire
- Two four-ton anchors
- 15 fathoms of 2 1/4" chain
- 250 fathoms of 1 5/8" wire rope
- Set of four fold-blocks with 1200' of 5/8" wire rope
- Four plate shackles for connecting wires, chain and anchor
- Portable gas-driven winches with 7.5 tons line pull where ship's power was not available
