= Ballistic missile flight phases =

Flight phases of ballistic missiles

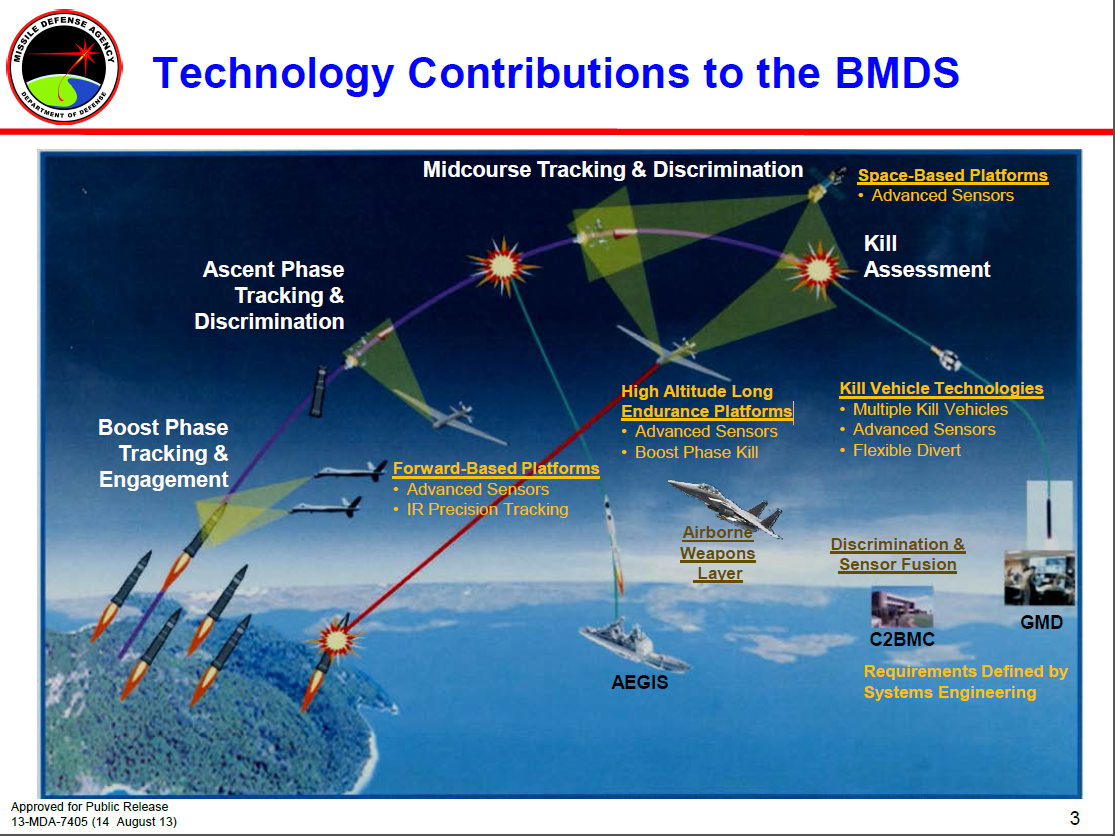
Trajectory phases

A ballistic missile goes through several distinct phases of flight that are common to almost all such designs. They are, in order:

- boost phase when the main boost rocket or upper stages are firing;
- post-boost phase when any last-minute changes to the trajectory are made by the upper stage or warhead bus and the warheads, and any decoys are released;
- midcourse which represents most of the flight when the objects coast; and
- terminal phase as the warhead approaches its target and, for longer-ranged missiles, begins to reenter the atmosphere.

These phases are particularly important when discussing ballistic missile defense concepts. Each phase has a different level of difficulty in performing an interception, as well as a different outcome in terms of its effect on the attack as a whole. For instance, defenses that take place during the terminal phase are considered simpler to develop in technical terms as they require only short-range missiles and radars. However, terminal defenses also face the most difficult targets, the multiple warheads and decoys released during the post-boost phase. In contrast, boost-phase defenses are difficult to build because they have to be located close to the target, often in space, but every success destroys all of the warheads and decoys.

== Boost phase ==
The boost phase is the portion of the flight of a ballistic missile or space vehicle during which the booster and sustainer engines operate until it reaches peak velocity. This phase can take 3 to 4 minutes for a solid rocket (shorter for a liquid-propellant rocket), the altitude at the end of this phase is 150–200 km, and the typical burn-out speed is 7 km/s.

Boost-phase intercept is a type of missile defense technology that would be designed to disable enemy missiles while they are still in the boost phase. Such defenses have the advantage of being able to easily track their targets through the infrared signature of the rocket exhaust, and that boosters are generally much less robust than the warheads or bus. Destroying the booster also destroys all of the warheads and decoys, and even simply pushing it off its trajectory can make it impossible for its payload to reach its destination.

Boost-phase intercepts are also generally the most difficult to arrange, as they require the interceptor to be within attack range within the few minutes while the missile engines are firing. Given some sort of positive control over the launch, this means there is only a short time for the weapons to reach their targets after the launch command is given. This requires very high-speed weapons located close to the enemy launchers, or weapons like particle beams or lasers that operate at speeds close to the speed of light.

Project Excalibur was a major boost-phase weapon design of the Strategic Defense Initiative. This used an x-ray laser stationed on a submarine off the coast of the Soviet Union that would "pop-up" a weapon when a launch was detected. Each missile that Excalibur destroyed would eliminate hundreds of targets that would have to be dealt with in later stages. Brilliant Pebbles was another boost-phase system that consisted of tens of thousands of heat seeking missiles in orbit, so that at least thousands would be over the Soviet Union at all times. Such systems proved to be were widely regarded as beyond the state of the art and development was eventually cancelled.

== Post-boost phase ==
The post-boost phase is the portion of the flight immediately after the boost phase. During this phase, the payload is released. In the case of a modern ICBM or SLBM, it is during this period that the warhead bus aims and releases the individual warheads on their separate trajectories, and ejects any decoys.

Interceptions that take place early in the post-boost phase have similar advantages to the boost phase, in that a single attack may destroy all of the warheads and decoys. The value of an attack during this phase diminishes as it continues, as the bus continues to release its payload. It has the added difficulty of having to use much more sensitive tracking systems as the rocket engine on the bus is far less powerful and is likely very "cold" in relation to the booster.

== Midcourse ==
The midcourse phase represents the majority of the time of flight of a ballistic missile, from minutes to the better part of an hour depending on the range of the missile. During this phase the payload follows a ballistic trajectory, with warheads, decoys and radar reflectors mixed together in an extended formation known as the target cloud. In the case of ICBMs, the cloud may be as large as 1 mile (1.6 km) across and 10 miles (16 km) long.

While the midcourse provides the longest time to perform an interception, it is also the most difficult time to do so due to the presence of the extended cloud. Some weapons, like the x-ray burst from a nuclear warhead, can damage or destroy a warhead within an extended range. However, the warhead can be "hardened" against such attacks, reducing this range to hundreds of yards. Without some way to discriminate the warheads, dozens of interceptors may be required to ensure destroying the warhead hiding within the cloud.

Picking out the warheads in the cloud remains an unsolved problem by either radar or optical means. A number of suggestions have been made that generally involve placing some sort of mass, like a gas or dust, in the path of the cloud, and then watching the deceleration of the masses. The much denser warhead will slow less than lighter decoys, allowing it to be discriminated.

== Terminal ==
The terminal phase of a missile trajectory begins when the payload begins to reenter the atmosphere. The precise definition varies, but below about 60 kilometres (37 mi) the atmosphere begins to thicken to the point where drag begins to have a noticeable effect on the objects in the cloud. This region is sometimes referred to as the deep terminal phase.

Interceptions during the terminal phase are among the simplest, both technically and in terms of tracking. Once the objects in the cloud begin to enter the lower atmosphere, the lighter decoys and chaff begin to slow down more rapidly than the much denser warheads. Examining the deceleration of the cloud will reveal the warheads as the objects with the least deceleration. This atmospheric decluttering becomes more pronounced as the objects continue to fall, which makes it advantageous to wait until the last possible moment before attacking. This was the premise behind the Nike-X system, where interceptions took place only a few seconds before the warheads would explode.

The major disadvantage of terminal phase attacks is that the decluttering takes time, which is time you no longer have to launch an interceptor. Against a large attack with many warheads, there may be little time to arrange all of the interceptions. More importantly, waiting until the last moment necessarily means the interception takes place at shorter range (unless using a weapon that travels at the speed of light) which means protecting a large area may require a very large number of interceptor bases spread over that area.
