= XRL =

XRL may refer to:

- Guangzhou–Shenzhen–Hong Kong Express Rail Link, a high-speed railway line connecting Beijing and Hong Kong
- Hong Kong West Kowloon railway station, Hong Kong, Immigration Department station code XRL
- X-ray laser, a device that uses stimulated emission (The acronym can refer to these in either the general sense, or as a part of the Strategic Defense Initiative, Project Excalibur)
