= Project Excalibur =

Anti-missile system using an X-ray laser powered by a nuclear bomb

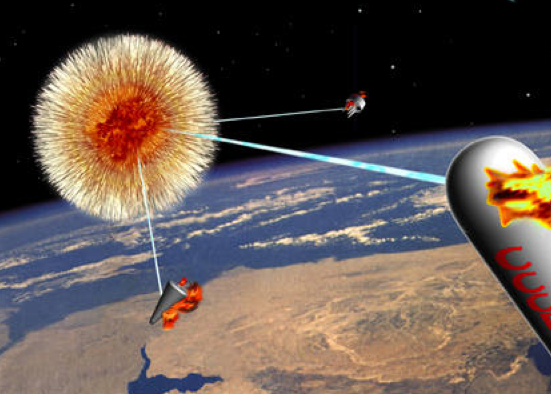
An illustration depicting Excalibur firing at three nearby targets. In most descriptions, each could fire at dozens of targets, which would be hundreds or thousands of kilometers away.

Project Excalibur was a Lawrence Livermore National Laboratory (LLNL) Cold War–era research program to develop an X-ray laser system as a ballistic missile defense (BMD) for the United States. The concept involved packing large numbers of expendable X-ray lasers around a nuclear device, which would orbit in space. During an attack, the device would be detonated, with the X-rays released focused by each laser to destroy multiple incoming target missiles. Because the system would be deployed above the Earth's atmosphere, the X-rays could reach missiles thousands of kilometers away, providing protection over a wide area.

Anti-ballistic missile (ABM) systems of the time only attacked the enemy nuclear warheads after they were released by ICBMs. A single ICBM could carry as many as a dozen warheads, so dozens of defense missiles were required per attacking missile. A single Excalibur device contained up to fifty lasers and could potentially destroy a corresponding number of missiles, with all of the warheads still on board. (Note: The later "Super Excalibur" concept theoretically supported thousands of lasers.) A single Excalibur could thus destroy dozens of ICBMs and hundreds of warheads for the cost of a single nuclear bomb, improving the cost-exchange ratio that had previously doomed ABM systems.

The basic concept behind Excalibur was conceived in the 1970s by George Chapline Jr. and further developed by Peter L. Hagelstein, both part of Edward Teller's "O-Group" in LLNL. After a successful test in 1980, in 1981 Teller and Lowell Wood began talks with US president Ronald Reagan about the concept. These talks, combined with strong support from The Heritage Foundation, helped Reagan ultimately to announce the Strategic Defense Initiative (SDI) in 1983. Further underground nuclear tests through the early 1980s suggested progress was being made, and this influenced the 1986 Reykjavík Summit, where Reagan refused to give up the possibility of proof-testing SDI technology with nuclear testing in space.

Researchers at Livermore and Los Alamos began to raise concerns about the test results. Teller and Wood continued to state the program was proceeding well, even after a critical test in 1985 demonstrated it was not working as expected. This led to significant criticism within the US weapons laboratories. In 1987, the infighting became public, leading to an investigation on whether LLNL had misled the government about the Excalibur concept. In a 60 Minutes interview in 1988, Teller attempted to walk out rather than answer questions about the lab's treatment of a fellow worker who questioned the results. Further tests revealed additional problems, and in 1988 the budget was cut dramatically. The project officially continued until 1992 when its last planned test, Greenwater of Operation Julin, was cancelled.

== History ==
=== Conceptual development ===
The conceptual basis of short-wavelength lasers, using X-rays and gamma rays, is the same as that of their visible-light counterparts. There were discussions of such devices as early as 1960, the year the first ruby laser was demonstrated.

The first announcement of a successful X-ray laser was made in 1972 by the University of Utah. Researchers spread thin layers of copper atoms on microscope slides and then heated them with pulses from a neodymium glass laser. This caused spots to appear on X-ray film in the direction of the layers and none in other directions. The announcement caused great excitement, but it was soon overshadowed by the fact that no other labs could reproduce the results, and the announcement was soon forgotten. In 1974, the University of Paris-Sud announced lasing in an aluminum plasma created by a pulse of laser light, but, once again, the results were regarded skeptically by other labs.

DARPA had been funding low-level research into high-frequency lasers since the 1960s. By late 1976 they had all but given up on them. They commissioned a report by Physical Dynamics, which outlined possible uses of such a laser, including space-based weapons. None of these seemed promising, and DARPA dropped funding for X-ray laser research in favor of the more promising free electron laser.

In June 1977, two well-known Soviet researchers, Igor Sobel'man and Vladilen Letokhov, displayed a film exposed to the output of plasmas of chlorine, calcium and titanium, similar to the Utah results. They were careful to point out that the results were very preliminary and further study was required. Over the next few years, a small number of additional papers on the topic were presented. The most direct of these was Sobel'man's statements at a 1979 conference in Novosibirsk when he said he was observing lasing in a calcium plasma. As with earlier announcements, these results were met with skepticism.

=== First attempts at Livermore ===
George Chapline had been studying the X-ray laser concept through the 1970s. Chapline was a member of Teller's speculative-project "O-Group" and began to discuss the concept with fellow O-Group member Lowell Wood, Teller's protégé. The two collaborated on a major review of the X-ray laser field in 1975. They suggested such a device would be a powerful tool in materials science, for making holograms of viruses where a conventional laser's longer wavelength did not provide the required optical resolution, and as a sort of flashbulb for taking images of the nuclear fusion process in their inertial confinement fusion devices. This review contained the calculations that demonstrated both the rapid reaction times needed in such a device and the extremely high energies required for pumping.

"I instantly put together the ideas I had gotten from Sobelman's talk with the results of the experiment, and in five minutes came up with the general idea of something that would most likely work to make an X-ray laser with a nuclear device."

— George Chapline

Chapline attended a meeting where Sobel'man was giving a talk on his work on X-ray lasers. Chapline had learned of the unique underground nuclear tests made on behalf of the Defense Nuclear Agency (DNA), where the burst of X-rays produced by the nuclear reactions were allowed to travel down a long tunnel while the blast itself was cut off by large doors that slammed shut as the explosion approached. These tests were used to investigate the effects of X-rays from exoatmospheric nuclear explosions on reentry vehicles. He realized this was a perfect way to pump an X-ray laser.

After a few weeks of work, he came up with a testable concept. At this time the DNA was making plans for another of its X-ray effects tests, and Chapline's device could easily be tested in the same "shot". The test shot, Diablo Hawk, was carried out on 13 September 1978 as part of the Operation Cresset series. However, the instrumentation on Chapline's device failed, and there was no way to know if the system had worked.

Congress directed that $10 million be given to both Lawrence Livermore National Laboratory (LLNL) and Los Alamos National Laboratory (LANL) for weapons tests on entirely new concepts. Chapline was given the go-ahead to plan for a new test dedicated to the X-ray laser concept. In the DNA tests, the reentry vehicle had to be retrieved for study after the test, which demanded the complex system of protective doors and other techniques that made these tests very expensive. For the X-ray laser test, all of this could be ignored, as the laser was designed to be destroyed in the explosion. This allowed the laser to be placed at the top of the vertical access shaft, which greatly lowered the cost of the test from the typical $40 million needed in a DNA shot. Given the schedule at the Nevada Test Site, their test would have to wait until 1980.

=== Dauphin success ===
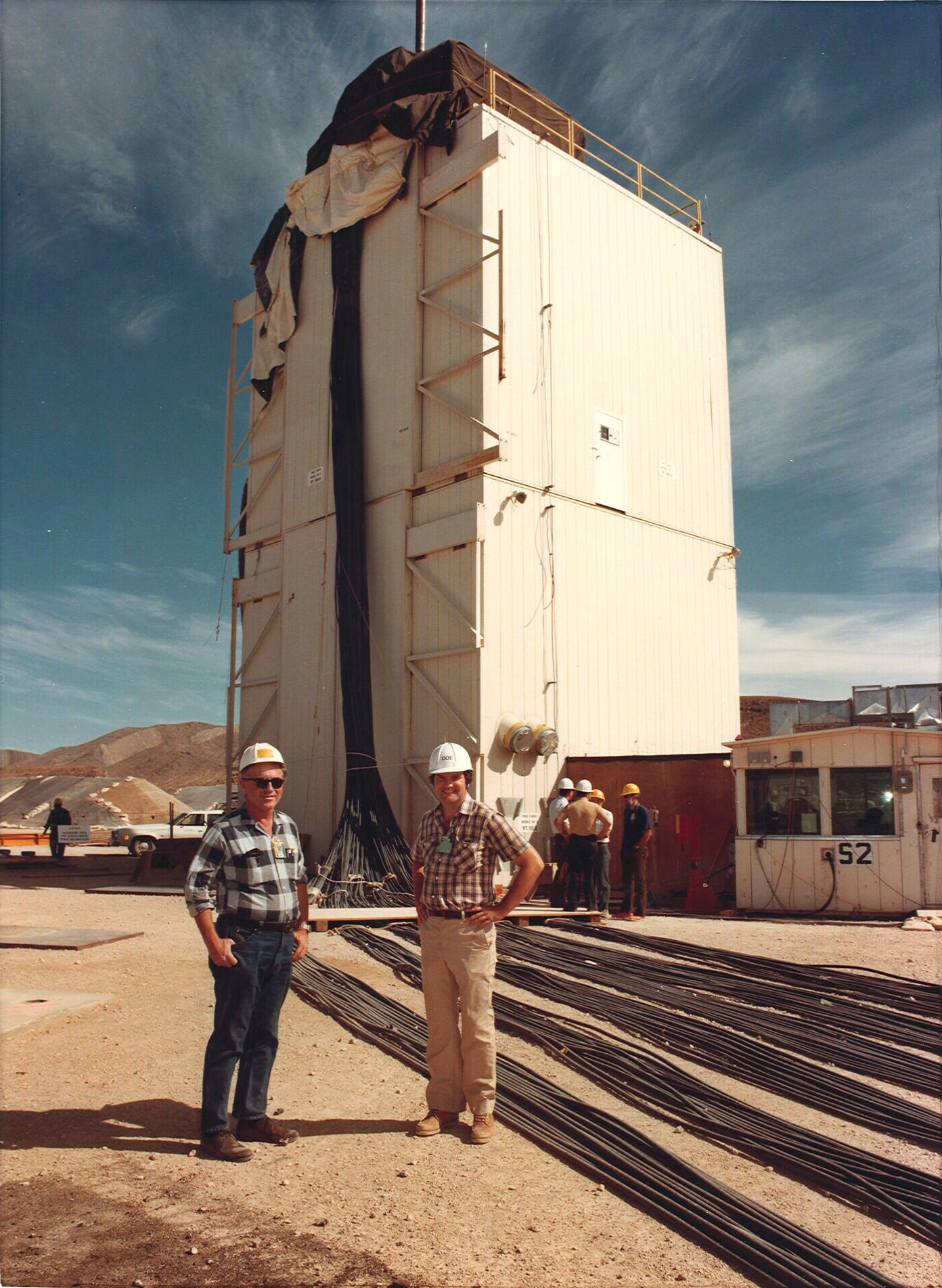
George Chapline Jr. (right) and George Maenchen (left) at the world's first X-ray laser prior to the Dauphin underground nuclear test

Peter Hagelstein was in an undergraduate physics program at MIT in 1974 when he applied for a Hertz Foundation scholarship. Teller was on the Hertz board, and Hagelstein soon had an interview with Lowell Wood. Hagelstein won the scholarship, and Wood then went on to offer him a summer position at LLNL. He had never heard of the lab, and Wood explained they were working on lasers, fusion, and similar concepts. Hagelstein arrived in May 1975, but nearly left when he found the area to be "disgusting" and immediately surmised they were working on weapons research when he saw the barbed wire and armed guards. He stayed on only because he met interesting people.

Hagelstein was given the task of simulating the X-ray laser process on LLNL's supercomputers. His program, known as XRASER for "X-Ray laser", eventually grew to about 40,000 lines of code. He received his master's degree in 1976 and took a full-time job at the lab, intending to lead the development of a working laser. The idea was to use the lab's powerful fusion lasers as an energy source, as Hagelstein and Wood had suggested in their review paper. Hagelstein used XRASER to simulate about 45 such concepts before he found one that appeared to work. These used the lasers to heat metal foils and give off X-rays, but by the late 1970s, none of these experiments had been successful.

After the Diablo Hawk failure, Hagelstein reviewed Chapline's idea and came up with a new concept that should be much more efficient. Chapline had used a lightweight material, a fiber taken from a local weed, but Hagelstein suggested using a metal rod instead. Although initially skeptical, Wood came to support the idea and successfully argued that both concepts be tested in Chapline's shot. The critical test was carried out on 14 November 1980 as Dauphin, part of Operation Guardian. Both lasers worked, but Hagelstein's design was much more powerful. The lab soon decided to move forward with Hagelstein's version, forming the "R Program", led by another O-Group member, Tom Weaver.

=== Renewed interest ===
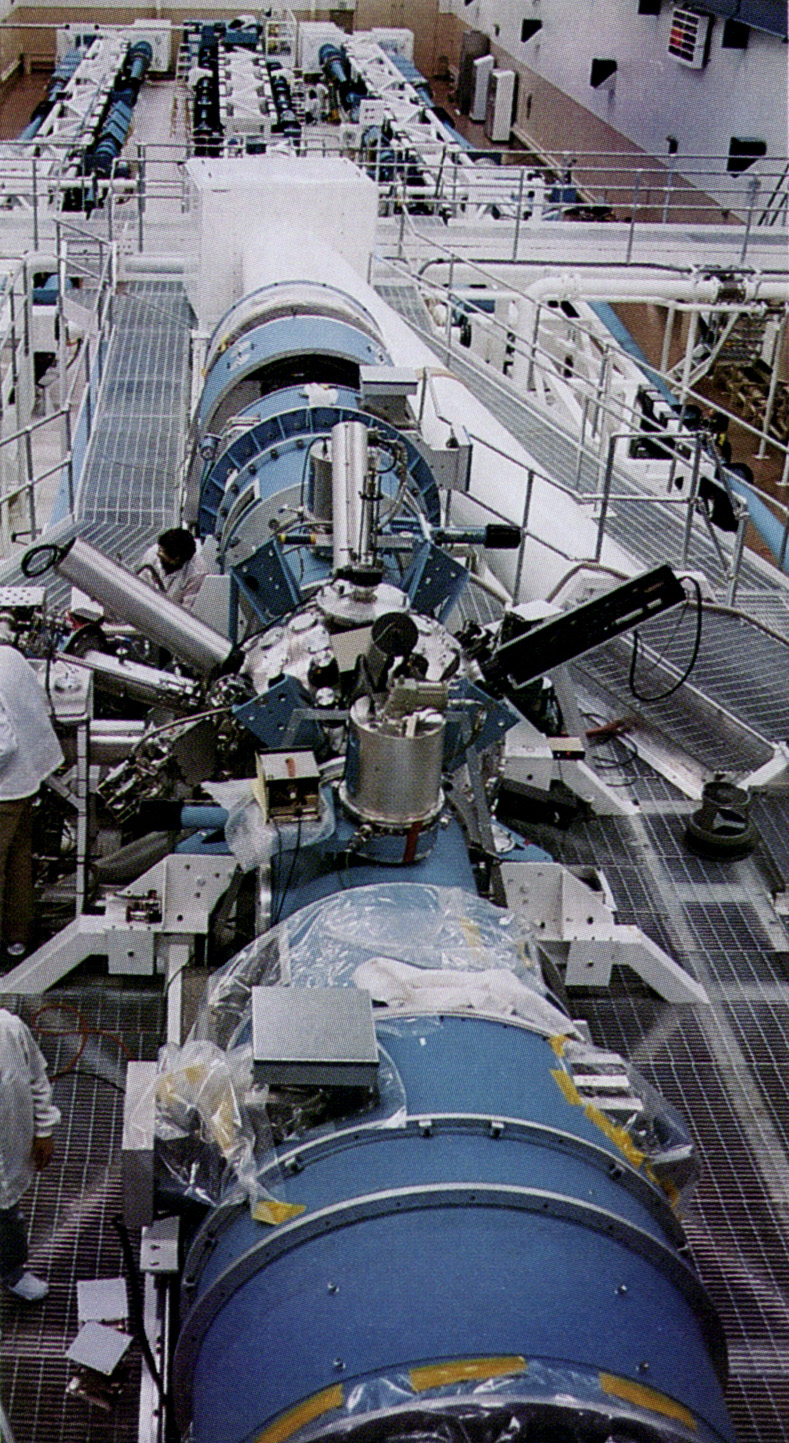
The Novette laser provided the energy needed for Hagelstein's successful X-ray laser.

Hagelstein published his PhD thesis in January 1981 on the "Physics of Short-wavelength-laser Design". In contrast to Chapline and Wood's earlier work which focused on civilian applications, the thesis' introduction mentions several potential uses, even weapons taken from science fiction works.

Hagelstein soon returned to the civilian side of the X-ray laser development, initially developing a concept in which the lab's fusion lasers would produce a plasma whose photons would pump another material. This was initially based on fluorine gas confined inside a chromium foil film. This proved to be too difficult to manufacture, so a system more like the earlier Soviet concepts was developed. The laser would deposit enough energy in a selenium wire to cause 24 of the electrons to be ionized, leaving behind 10 electrons that would be pumped by collisions with the free electrons in the plasma.

After several attempts using the Novette laser as an energy source, on 13 July 1984 the system worked for the first time. The team calculated that the system produced laser amplification of about 700, which they considered to be strong evidence of lasing. Dennis Matthews presented the success at the October 1984 American Physical Society Plasma Physics Meeting in Boston, where Szymon Suckewer of Princeton University presented their evidence of lasing in carbon using a much smaller laser and confined the plasma using magnets.

=== Teller in Washington, AvWeek "leaks" ===
The success of the Dauphin test presented a potential new solution to the BMD problem. The X-ray laser offered the possibility that many laser beams could be generated from a single nuclear weapon in orbit, meaning a single weapon would destroy many ICBMs. This would blunt the attack to such an extent that any US response would be overwhelming in comparison. Even if the Soviets launched a full-scale attack, it would limit US casualties to 30 million. In February 1981, Teller and Wood traveled to Washington to present the technology to the policy makers and request greater financial support to pursue the development.

This presented a problem. As fellow LLNL physicist Hugh DeWitt put it, "It has long been known that Teller and Wood are extreme technological optimists and super salesmen for hypothetical new weapons systems", or as Robert Park put it, "Anyone who knows Teller's record recognizes that he is invariably optimistic about even the most improbable technological schemes." Although this salesmanship had little effect in US military circles, it proved to be a continual annoyance in Congress, having a negative effect on the lab's credibility when these concepts failed to pan out. To avoid this, Roy Woodruff, the associate director of the weapons section, went with them to ensure the two did not oversell the concept. In meetings with various congressional groups, Teller and Wood explained the technology but refused to give dates on when it might be available.

Only days later, the 23 February 1981 edition of Aviation Week and Space Technology carried an article on the ongoing work. It described the Dauphin shot in some detail, going on to mention the earlier 1978 test, but incorrectly ascribing that to a krypton fluoride laser (KrF). (Note: Visible-spectrum gas lasers that were optically pumped by nuclear weapons had been developed and tested, and it is likely the Aviation Week article is confusing these earlier tests with the 1978 X-ray test.) It went on to describe the battle-station concept in which a single bomb would be surrounded by laser rods that could destroy as many as fifty missiles, and stated that "X-Ray lasers based on the successful Dauphin test are so small that a single payload bay on the Space Shuttle could carry to orbit a number sufficient to stop a Soviet nuclear weapons attack." This was the first in a series of such articles in this and other sources based on a "steady leak of top secret information".

=== High Frontier ===
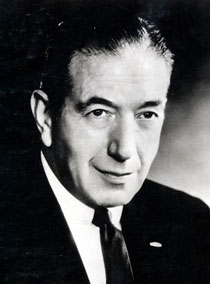
Karl Bendetsen chaired the efforts that would eventually present the basis for SDI to Reagan; Excalibur was one of the three major concepts studied by the group.

By this time, LLNL was not the only group lobbying the government about space-based weapons. In 1979, Daniel O. Graham had been asked by Ronald Reagan to begin exploring the idea of missile defense, and in the years since had become a strong advocate of what was earlier known as Project BAMBI (Ballistic Missile Boost Intercept), but now updated as "Smart Rocks". This required dozens of large satellites carrying many small, relatively simple missiles which would be launched at the ICBMs and track them like a conventional heat seeking missile.

That same year, Malcolm Wallop and his aide Angelo Codevilla wrote an article on "Opportunities and Imperatives in Ballistic Missile Defense", which was to be published later that year in Strategic Review. Their concept, known simply as the Space Based Laser, used large chemical lasers placed in orbit. They were later joined by Harrison Schmidt and Teller in forming what became known as the "laser lobby", advocating the building of laser-based BMD systems.

Graham was able to garner interest from other Republican supporters and formed a group who would help advocate for his concept. The group was chaired by Karl Bendetsen and was provided space at The Heritage Foundation. The group invited the laser lobby to join them to plan a strategy to introduce these concepts to the incoming president.

At one of the Heritage Foundation meetings, Graham said there was a serious problem with the Excalibur concept, noting that if the Soviets launched a missile at the satellite, the US had only two choices – they could allow the missile to hit Excalibur and destroy it, or it could defend itself by shooting down the missile, which would also destroy Excalibur. In either case, a single missile would destroy the station, which invalidated the entire concept of the system in terms of having a single weapon that would destroy a large portion of the Soviet fleet.

At the time, Teller was stumped. At the next meeting, he and Wood had an answer, apparently Teller's own concept. Instead of being based on satellites, Excalibur would be placed in submarines and "pop-up" when the Soviets launched their missiles. This would also bypass another serious concern, that nuclear weapons in space were outlawed and it was unlikely the government or public would allow these.

The group first met with the president on 8 January 1982. Planned to last 15 minutes, the meeting went on for an hour. Present were Teller, Bendetsen, William Wilson and Joseph Coors of the "Kitchen Cabinet". Graham and Wallop were not represented and the group apparently dismissed their concepts. The same group met with the president another three times. (Note: According to Theodore Postol, Reagan was initially unaware that the system relied on bombs in space, and refused to allow it.)

Meanwhile, Teller continued to attack Graham's interceptor-based concept, as did other members of the group. There had been extensive studies on BAMBI in the 1960s and every few years since. These invariably reported the concept was simply too grandiose to work. Graham, seeing the others outmaneuver him after the first meetings, left the group and formed "High Frontier Inc.", publishing a glossy book on the topic in March 1982. Before publication, he had sent a copy to the US Air Force for comment. They responded with another report stating the concept "had no technical merit and should be rejected". In spite of this review, the High Frontier book was widely distributed and quickly found followers. This led to a curious situation in early 1982, later known as the "laser wars", with the House supporting Teller and the Senate supporting Wallop's group.

Later that summer, Teller complained to William F. Buckley on Firing Line that he did not have access to the president. This led to a 4 September meeting with the president without the rest of the High Frontier group. Teller said recent advances in Soviet weapons would soon put them in a position to threaten the US and they needed to build Excalibur without delay. Without Woodruff to temper his comments, Teller told the president the system would be ready for deployment in five years and that it was time to talk about "assured survival" instead of "assured destruction". Aviation Week reported that Teller had asked for $200 million a year "over the next several years" to develop it.

=== Early skepticism ===
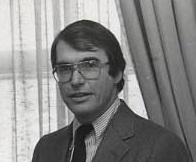
Keyworth was skeptical of High Frontier's concepts, but eventually came to support them publicly.

George A. Keyworth, II had been appointed to the position as Reagan's science advisor at the suggestion of Teller. He was present at the first meeting with the Heritage group, and a few days later at a White House staff meeting he was quoted expressing his concerns that the concepts had "very difficult technical aspects".

Shortly thereafter, Edwin Meese suggested Keyworth form an independent group to study the feasibility of such a system. The work was passed to Victor H. Reis, formerly of the Lincoln Laboratory and now the assistant director of the Office of Science and Technology Policy. He formed a panel including Charles Townes, Nobel winner as the co-inventor of the maser and laser, Harold Agnew, former director of LANL, and chaired by Edward Frieman, vice president of military science contractor Science Applications International Corporation (SAIC). Keyworth gave them a year to study the issues, and did not interfere with their process.

The formation of this panel apparently worried Teller, who suspected they would not agree with his assessments of Excalibur's viability. In response, he stepped up his fundraising efforts, spending a considerable time in 1982 in Washington lobbying for a Manhattan Project-level effort to bring the system to production as soon as possible. While he was not part of the Frieman panel, he was part of the White House Science Council, and appeared at their meetings to continue pressuring for further development.

In June 1982, the Frieman panel asked LLNL to review their own progress. Led by Woodruff, the lab returned a fairly conservative review. They suggested that if they were provided $150–$200 million a year over six years they could decide whether the concept was feasible. They said a weapon could not possibly be ready before the mid-1990s, at the very earliest. In its final report, the panel concluded that the system simply could not be thought of as a military technology.

Teller was apoplectic, and threatened to resign from the Science Council. He ultimately agreed to a second review by LLNL. This review was even more critical of the concept, stating that, due to energy limits, the system would be useful only against missiles at short range and that would limit it to those missiles launched from locations close to the United States, like submarine-launched ballistic missiles.

In the meantime, while Keyworth continued to support the concepts publicly, he was careful not to make statements that sounded like outright support. He spoke of the promise of the systems and their potential. But when asked about Excalibur after receiving the Frieman report, he was much more blunt and told reporters the concept was probably unusable. In 1985, he quit the position and returned to private industry.

Teller's continual presence in Washington soon came to the attention of his former friend, Hans Bethe. Bethe had worked with Teller on the H-bomb but had since gone on to become a major critic of the bomb industry, and especially ABM systems. He wrote several seminal articles in the 1960s highly critical of the US Army's efforts to build an ABM system, demonstrating that any such system was relatively inexpensive to defeat and would simply prompt the Soviets to build more ICBMs.

Bethe remained an opponent of ABM systems, and when he heard of the Excalibur effort he arranged a trip to LLNL to grill them on the concept. In a two-day series of meetings in February 1983, Hagelstein managed to convince Bethe the physics was sound. Bethe remained convinced the idea was unlikely to be able to stop a Soviet attack, especially if they designed their systems knowing such a system existed. He soon co-authored a report by the Union of Concerned Scientists outlining objections to the concept, the simplest being that the Soviets could simply overwhelm it.

=== SDI ===
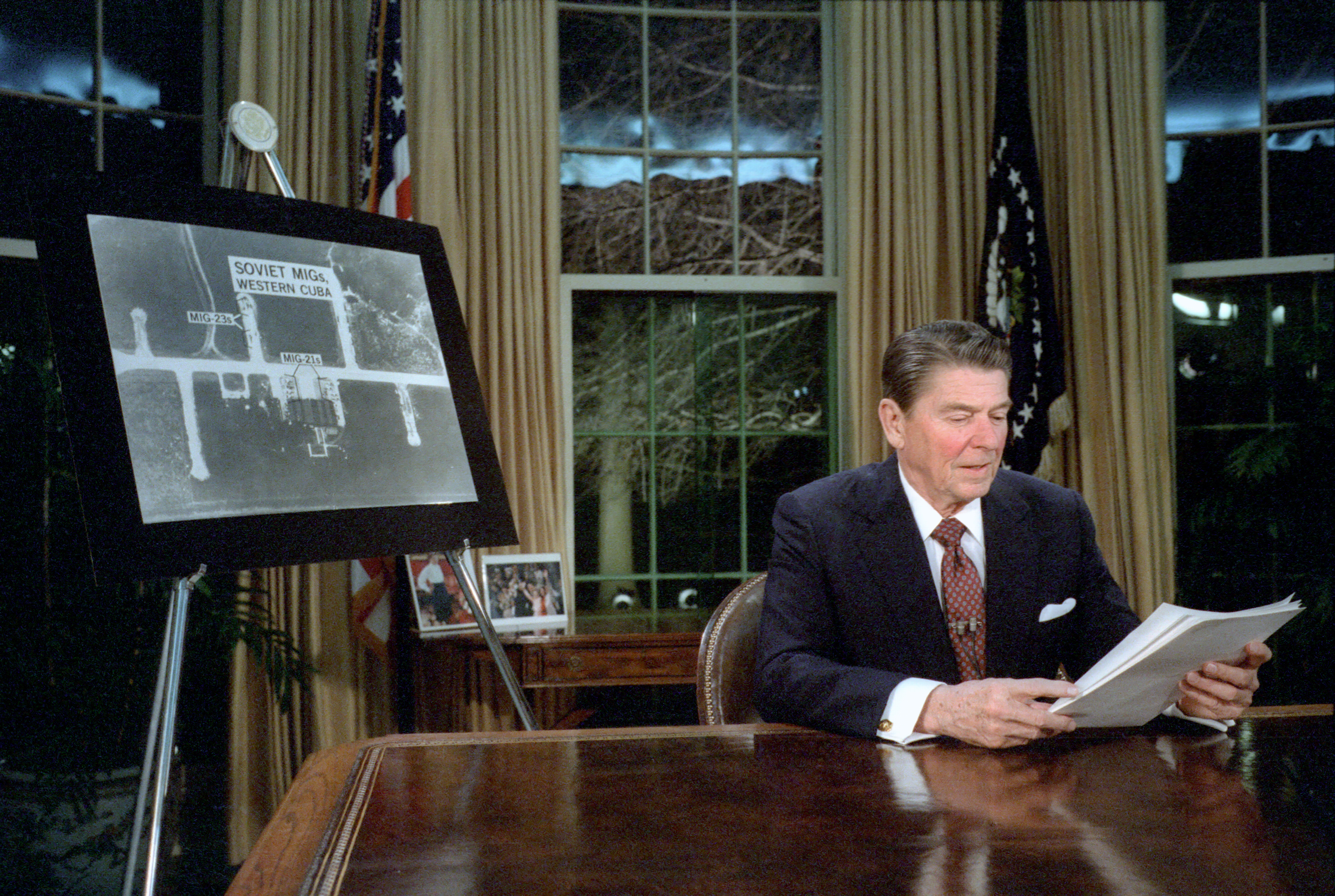
President Ronald Reagan delivers the 23 March 1983 speech initiating SDI.

Reagan had long been deeply critical of current nuclear doctrine, which he and his aides derided as a "mutual suicide pact". He was extremely interested in the Heritage group's proposals. While he made no overt moves at the time, he spent a significant amount of time in 1982 gathering information from various sources on whether or not the system was possible. Reports by both the Department of Defense and the White House's own Science Council would feed into this process.

In early 1983, before many of these reports had been returned, Reagan decided to announce what would become SDI. Few people were told of this decision and even Keyworth learned of it only a few weeks before it was going to be announced. When he showed a draft of the speech to Reis, Reis said it was "Laetrile", referring to the quack cure for cancer. He suggested Keyworth demand a review by the Joint Chiefs of Staff or resign. Keyworth did neither, prompting Reis to resign a short time later, taking a position at SAIC.

After a year of presentations from The Heritage Foundation and others, on 23 March 1983 Reagan went on television and announced that he was calling "upon the scientific community who gave us nuclear weapons to turn their great talents to the cause of mankind and world peace: to give us the means of rendering these nuclear weapons impotent and obsolete." Many historical overviews place much of the impetus for this speech directly on Teller and Wood's presentations, and thus indirectly on Hagelstein's work.

On the same day the president was giving his speech, the Department of Defense was presenting its report to the Senate on the progress of DARPA's ongoing beam weapon research. The director of the Directed Energy Program said that while they offered promise, their "relative immaturity" made it difficult to know if they would ever be used, and in any event would be unlikely to have any effect until the "1990s or beyond". The Undersecretary of Defense, Richard DeLauer, later said these weapons were at least two decades away and development would have "staggering" costs.

The Secretary of Defense, Caspar Weinberger formed the Strategic Defense Initiative Office in April 1984, appointing General James Abrahamson as its head. Early estimates were for a budget of $26 billion over the first five years.

=== Further tests, instrumentation issues ===
Only a few days after Reagan's speech, on 26 March 1983, the second test of Hagelstein's design was carried out as part of the Cabra shot in the Operation Phalanx test series. Instrumentation again proved to be a problem and no good results were obtained. The identical experiment was carried out on 16 December 1983 in the Romano shot of the following Operation Fusileer series. This test showed gain and lasing.

On 22 December 1983, Teller wrote a letter on LLNL letterhead to Keyworth saying the system had concluded its scientific phase and was now "entering engineering phase". When Woodruff learned of the letter he stormed into Teller's office and demanded a retraction. Teller refused, so Woodruff wrote his own, only to be ordered not to send it by Roger Batzel, the lab's director. Batzel rebuffed Woodruff's complaints, saying Teller was meeting the president as a private citizen, not on behalf of Livermore.

Shortly after, LLNL scientist George Maenchen circulated a memo noting that the instrument used to measure the laser output was subject to interactions with the explosion. The system worked by measuring the brightness of a series of beryllium reflectors when they were illuminated by the lasers. Maenchen noted that the reflectors themselves could give off their own signals when heated by the bomb, and unless they were separately calibrated, there was no way to know if the signal was from the laser or the bomb. This calibration had not been carried out, rendering the results of all of these tests effectively useless.

By this time, Los Alamos had begun developing nuclear anti-missile weapons of its own, updated versions of the 1960s Casaba/Howitzer concepts. Given the constant stream of news about Excalibur, they added a laser to one of their own underground tests, shot Correo, also part of the Fusileer series. The 2 August 1984 test used different methods to measure the laser output, and these suggested that little or no lasing was taking place. George Miller received a "caustic" letter from Paul Robinson of Los Alamos, which stated they "doubted the existence of the X-ray laser had been demonstrated and that Livermore managers were losing their credibility because of their failure to stand up to Teller and Wood."

=== Concerned Scientists present concerns ===
The Union of Concerned Scientists presented a criticism of Excalibur in 1984 as part of a major report on the entire SDI concept. They noted that a key problem for all the directed energy weapons is that they work only in space, as the atmosphere quickly disperses the beams. This meant the systems had to intercept the missiles when they were above the majority of the atmosphere. Additionally, all of the systems relied on using infrared tracking of the missiles, as radar tracking could be easily rendered unreliable using a wide variety of countermeasures. Thus, the interception had to take place in the period where the missile motor was still firing. This left only a brief period in which the directed energy weapons could be used.

The report said this could be countered by simply increasing the thrust of the missile. Existing missiles fired for about three to four minutes, with at least half of that taking place outside the atmosphere. (Note: A Department of Defense backgrounder report has a diagram showing such an MX-like missile firing for 180 seconds.) They showed it was possible to reduce this to about a minute, timing things so the motor was burning out just as the missile was reaching the upper atmosphere. If the warheads were quickly separated at that point, the defense would have to shoot at the individual warheads, thus facing the same poor cost-exchange ratios that had made the earlier ABM systems effectively useless. And once the rocket had stopped firing, tracking would be far more difficult.

One of the key claims for the Excalibur concept was that a small number of weapons would be enough to counter a large Soviet fleet, whereas the other space-based systems would require huge fleets of satellites. The report singled out Excalibur as particularly vulnerable to the problem of quick-firing missiles because the only way to address this would be to build many more weapons so more would be available in the remaining short time window. At that point, it no longer had any advantage over the other systems, while still having all of the technical risks. The report concluded that the X-ray laser would "offer no prospect of being a useful component" of a BMD system.

=== Excalibur+ and Super-Excalibur ===
Faced with the twin problems of the original experiments apparently failing and the publication of a report showing that it could be easily defeated even if it worked, Teller and Wood responded by announcing the Excalibur Plus concept, which would be a thousand times more powerful than the original Excalibur. Soon after, they added Super-Excalibur, which was another thousand times more powerful than Excalibur Plus, making it a trillion times as bright as the bomb itself. (Note: There is significant confusion in various sources about whether Excalibur+ and Super Excalibur refer to a single design, or two. Coffey and Stevens are examples of these different views.)

Super-Excalibur would be so powerful it would be able to burn through the atmosphere, thereby countering the concerns about fast-firing missiles. The extra power also meant it could be divided up into more beams, making a single weapon able to be directed into as many as a hundred thousand beams. Instead of dozens of Excalibur weapons in pop-up launchers, Teller suggested that a single weapon in geostationary orbit "the size of an executive desk which applied this technology could potentially shoot down the entire Soviet land-based missile force if it were to be launched into the module's field of view." (Note: Stevens' overview of known parameters calls this claim into question; he calculates that the effective range of the weapon would be on the order of 3,000 kilometers (1,900 mi), while working backward, Wood and Teller's own statements put the upper limit around 10,000 kilometers (6,200 mi). Neither is nearly enough to make it effective when fired from stationary orbit at ~36,000 kilometers (22,000 mi).)

At this point, no detailed theoretical work on the concepts had been carried out, let alone any practical tests. In spite of this, Teller once again used LLNL letterhead to write to several politicians telling them of the great advance. This time Teller copied Batzel, but not Woodruff. Once again Woodruff asked to send a counterpoint letter, only to have Batzel refuse to let him send it.

=== Cottage test ===
Super-Excalibur was tested on the 23 March 1985 Cottage shot of Operation Grenadier, exactly two years after Reagan's speech. Once again the test appeared to be successful, and unnamed researchers at the lab were reported to have said the brightness of the beam had been increased six orders of magnitude (i.e. between one and ten million times), a huge advance that would pave the way for a weapon.

Teller immediately wrote another letter touting the success of the concept. This time he wrote to Paul Nitze, the head negotiator of START, and Robert McFarlane, head of the US National Security Council. Nitze was about to begin negotiations on the START arms limitations talks. Teller said Super-Excalibur would be so powerful the US should not seriously negotiate on any sort of even footing and that the talks should be delayed because they included limits or outright bans on underground testing, which would make further work on Super-Excalibur almost impossible.

Commenting on the results, Wood set an optimistic tone saying, "Where we stand between inception and production I can't tell you ... [but] I am much more optimistic now about the utility of X-ray lasers in strategic defense than when we started." In contrast, George H. Miller, LLNL's new deputy associate director, set a much more cautious tone, stating that while the lasing action had been demonstrated, "what we have not proven is whether you can make a militarily useful X-ray laser. It's a research program where a lot of the physics and engineering issues are still being examined ..."

Several months later, physicists at Los Alamos reviewed the Cottage results and noted the same problem Maenchen had mentioned earlier. They added such calibration to a test they were already carrying out and found that the results were indeed as bad as Maenchen has suggested. The targets contained oxygen that glowed when heated and produced spurious results. On top of this, Livermore scientists studying the results noted that the explosion created sound waves in the rod before the lasing was complete, ruining the focus of the laser. A new lasing medium would be required.

Livermore ordered an independent review of the program by Joseph Nilsen, who delivered a report on 27 June 1985 agreeing the system was not working. Given the gravity of the situation, a further review by the JASONs was carried out on 26 and 27 September and came to the same conclusion. It now appeared there was no conclusive evidence that any lasing had been seen in any of the tests, and if it had, it was simply not powerful enough.

In July, Miller went to Washington to brief the SDI Office (SDIO) on their progress. While the instrumentation concerns had been publicly reported on multiple occasions by this point, he failed to mention these issues. Several sources noted this, one saying they "were furious because Miller used the old view graphs on the experiment, which did not take into account the new disturbing findings".

=== Woodruff leaves ===
Shortly after the Cottage test, Teller once again met with Reagan. He petitioned the President for an additional $100 million in order to carry out additional underground testing the next year, which would roughly double the Excalibur budget for 1986. He said this was needed because the Soviets were stepping up their own research. (Note: One SDIO official noted that Teller's claims of Soviet research were "5 percent information and 95 percent conjecture".)

Later that year, Abrahamson, head of SDIO, called a 6 September 1985 meeting to review the status of the programs. Roy Woodruff was there to present LLNL's status. Teller arrived in the middle of the meeting and said Reagan had agreed that $100 million should be turned over to Excalibur. Without questioning this, Abrahamson then assigned $100 million to him, taking it from other programs. As one official noted, "Do you really want to challenge someone who says he's talked to the President? Do you really want to risk your status by asking Reagan if that's what he really said?"

At this point Woodruff, who had attempted to rein in Teller and Wood's continual overselling of the project, finally had enough. He filed a grievance with LLNL management, complaining that Teller and Wood "undercut my management responsibility for the X-ray laser program" and had repeatedly made "optimistic, technically incorrect statements regarding this research to the nation's highest policy-makers".

When he learned that Teller and Wood had made another presentation to Abrahamson, on 19 October 1985 he resigned his position and asked to be moved. At the time he said little about it, although there was widespread speculation in the press over why he had quit the program. The lab dismissed press speculation that it was punishment due to a critical review in the influential journal Science which appeared the same day. Teller refused to talk about the matter, while Woodruff simply pointed reporters to a statement put out by the lab.

Woodruff found himself banished to a windowless room he called "Gorky West", referring to the Russian city of Gorky where Soviet dissidents were sent on internal exile. Miller replaced him as associate director. A few months later, Woodruff began receiving condolences from other members of the lab. When he asked why, he was told that Batzel had said he resigned his position due to stress and a midlife crisis.

Woodruff went to Harold Weaver, head of the Berkeley-based lab oversight committee, to tell his side of the story. He learned that the group had already investigated, by sending a liaison to meet with Batzel, but had not bothered to talk to Woodruff. He attempted to explain his concerns about the overselling of the technology, but as Weaver later put it, "we were bamboozled by the laboratory."

=== Increased scrutiny ===
Starting in late 1985 and through 1986, a series of events turned opinion against Excalibur. One of the many arguments used to support Excalibur, and SDI as a whole, was the suggestion that the Soviets were working on the same ideas. In particular, they said the Soviets published numerous papers on X-ray lasers until 1977 when they suddenly stopped. They argued this was because they had also begun a military X-ray laser program, and were now classifying their reports. (Note: This basic line of reasoning, "but the Soviets are doing it", had been used repeatedly over the previous decades. It was used, sometimes based on fake stories leaked the press, to support the development of nuclear powered aircraft, flying saucer aircraft and was a major reason for the strong support of earlier ABM systems like Nike-X. The Aviation Week article in 1981 prompted Soviet X-ray laser developments, which demonstrated only 20 kJ of output.)

Wood used this line of argument during congressional meetings on SDI as an argument to keep funding Excalibur. He was then asked to expand on the possibility of a Soviet version of Excalibur and what a US response might be. Wood said X-ray lasers could be used against any object in space, including Soviet Excaliburs, referring to this use as a "counter-defensive" role.

This statement was quickly turned against him; if Excalibur could destroy a Soviet SDI system, then a Soviet Excalibur could do the same to theirs. Instead of ending the threat of nuclear weapons, Excalibur appeared to end the threat of SDI. More worryingly, when one considered such scenarios, it appeared the best use of such a system would be to launch a first strike; Soviet Excaliburs would destroy US defenses while their ICBMs attacked the US missile fleet in their missile silos, the remaining Soviet Excaliburs would then blunt the enfeebled response. Miller immediately sent a letter countering Wood's statements, but the damage was done.

Shortly thereafter, Hugh DeWitt wrote a letter to The New York Times about Excalibur. He explained the actual state of the program, saying it was "still in its infancy" and that developing it completely "might require 100 to 1200 more nuclear tests and could easily require ten to twenty more years". DeWitt and Ray Kidder then wrote to Edward Kennedy and Ed Markey to complain that LLNL's objection to ongoing talks of a nuclear test ban rested solely on the X-ray program.

=== Focusing failures ===
While this was taking place in the press, LLNL was preparing for another test shot, Goldstone, a part of Operation Charioteer scheduled for December 1985. After the problems with the earlier tests were noted, Los Alamos had suggested LLNL design a new sensor for this shot. LLNL refused, saying this would delay the test about six months and would have "unfavorable political repercussions for the program". Instead, Goldstone used a new reflector consisting of hydrogen gas which would address the calibration concerns. The new instruments demonstrated that the output of the lasers was at best ten percent of what the theoretical predictions required, and at worst, had produced no laser output at all.

Focusing was the primary concern of the next test, Labquark, carried out on 20 September 1986. This was apparently successful, suggesting the major problems with focusing had been addressed. A follow-up focusing test, Delamar, was carried out on 18 April 1987. This test demonstrated that the focusing in both this test and Labquark appeared to be an illusion; the beam had not narrowed and was not focused enough for long-range interceptions.

When the news broke, Teller blamed Woodruff, saying he had not been "a constructive member of the team". Teller continued to say the tests were actually a success, but that he was prevented from telling the real story due to government secrecy.

=== APS report on directed energy weapons ===
In 1984 the American Physical Society (APS) approached Keyworth with the idea of setting up a blue-ribbon panel to study the various weapons concepts independent of the labs. Keyworth and Abrahamson both agreed with this idea, giving the team complete access to classified materials as required. The APS panel took almost a year to form, and was co-chaired by Nicolaas Bloembergen, who won the 1981 Nobel Prize in Physics for his work on lasers, and Kumar Patel, who had invented the CO_{2} laser. The sixteen other members of the panel were similarly distinguished.

The report was completed in eighteen months, but due to the classified contents, it required about another seven months to clear the censors before the redacted version was released to the public in June 1987. The report, "The Science and Technology of Directed Energy Weapons", stated that the technologies in question were at least a decade away from the stage where it could be clearly stated whether or not they would even work.

Some of the systems appeared to be theoretically possible but needed more development. This was the case for the free electron laser, for instance, where the panel was able to offer specific information on the required improvements, calling for two or more orders of magnitude in energy (100 times). In contrast, the report's section on Excalibur suggested it was not clear it could ever work even in theory and was summarized thus:

Nuclear explosion pumped X-ray lasers require validation of many of the physical concepts before their application to strategic defense can be evaluated.

The report also noted that the energy requirements for a directed energy weapon used as a BMD asset was much higher than the energy needed for the same weapon to be used against those assets. This meant even if the SDI weapons could be successfully developed, they could be attacked by similar weapons that would be easier to develop. The movement of space-based assets in well-known orbital paths also made them much easier to attack and exposed to attack for longer times compared to the same systems being used to attack ICBMs, whose initial positions were unknown and disappeared in minutes.

The report noted this was particularly true of pop-up X-ray lasers. They noted that:

The high energy-to-weight ratio of nuclear explosive devices driving the directed energy beam weapons permits their use as "pop-up" devices. For this reason, the X-ray laser, if successfully developed, would constitute a particularly serious threat against space-based assets of a BMD.

A specific concern, in this case, was the susceptibility of the optics, and especially their optical coatings, of the various space-based weapons. Even relatively low-intensity laser light could damage these devices, blinding their optics and rendering the weapons unable to track their targets. Given the light weight of the Excalibur-type weapons, the Soviets could rapidly pop-up such a device just prior to launching an attack, and blind all the SDI assets in the region even with a low-powered weapon.

=== Woodruff affair, GAO report ===
During the later half of 1987, Woodruff found that no work was being assigned to him. With little to do, the lab threatened to cut his salary. On 2 February 1987, Batzel gave him a memo saying any problems he had were his own making. His final appeal, to the university president David Gardner, was likewise turned down.

In response, in April 1987 Woodruff filed two official grievances. This prompted a private review by John S. Foster Jr. and George Dacey at the urging of the Department of Energy. This report apparently had no effect. The story became known within the labs, and the way Batzel retaliated against Woodruff became a major point of concern among the employees. A number of scientists in the lab were so upset at his treatment they wrote an April 1987 letter about it to Gardner. When they asked for people to sign the cover letter, they were "practically stampeded" by volunteers. This was one of many signs of growing turmoil in the labs.

In October 1987, someone sent a copy of Woodruff's grievance to the Federation of American Scientists, who then turned it over to the newspapers. Woodruff was visiting Los Alamos when the first stories came in over the Associated Press wire, which resulted in a standing ovation by the other scientists. The press, now largely turned against SDI, made it a major issue they came to refer to as the "Woodruff Affair".

The press articles on the topic, which were generally more widespread in California newspapers, came to the attention of California Congressman George Brown Jr. Brown triggered an investigation by the General Accounting Office (GAO). Brown later said Teller's version of events was "politically motivated exaggerations aimed at distorting national policy and funding decisions".

The GAO report stated that they found a wide variety of opinions on the X-ray laser project, but Teller and Wood were "essentially off the scale on the optimistic side". They noted that Woodruff's attempts to correct these statements were blocked and that his complaints about the lab's behavior resulted in him becoming what the lab insider called a "nonperson" in which longtime colleagues stopped talking to him. But the report also generally agreed with the lab on most other points, and then went on to accuse Woodruff of falsely stating he was a member of Phi Beta Kappa.

It was later revealed that a letter submitted by Ray Kidder for inclusion in the report had been removed. Kidder strongly agreed with Woodruff's version of events and said Woodruff's attempt to send letters "provided a frank, objective and balanced description of the Program as it existed at the time".

Batzel had already decided to retire by this time, and his position was filled by John Nuckolls. Nuckolls gave Woodruff the position as an assistant associate director for treaty verification efforts, a position of some importance as SDI began to wind down while at the same time new treaties made such verification efforts important. Nevertheless, in 1990 Woodruff left to take a position at Los Alamos.

As Woodruff had feared, the result was to seriously erode the reputation of LLNL in the government. John Harvey, LLNL's director for advanced strategic systems, found that when he visited Washington he was asked: "what's the next lie that's going to come out?" Brown later commented: "I'm not inclined to call it an earthshattering report, but what has happened has created a lot of questions about the objectivity and reliability of the laboratory."

=== Excalibur ends ===
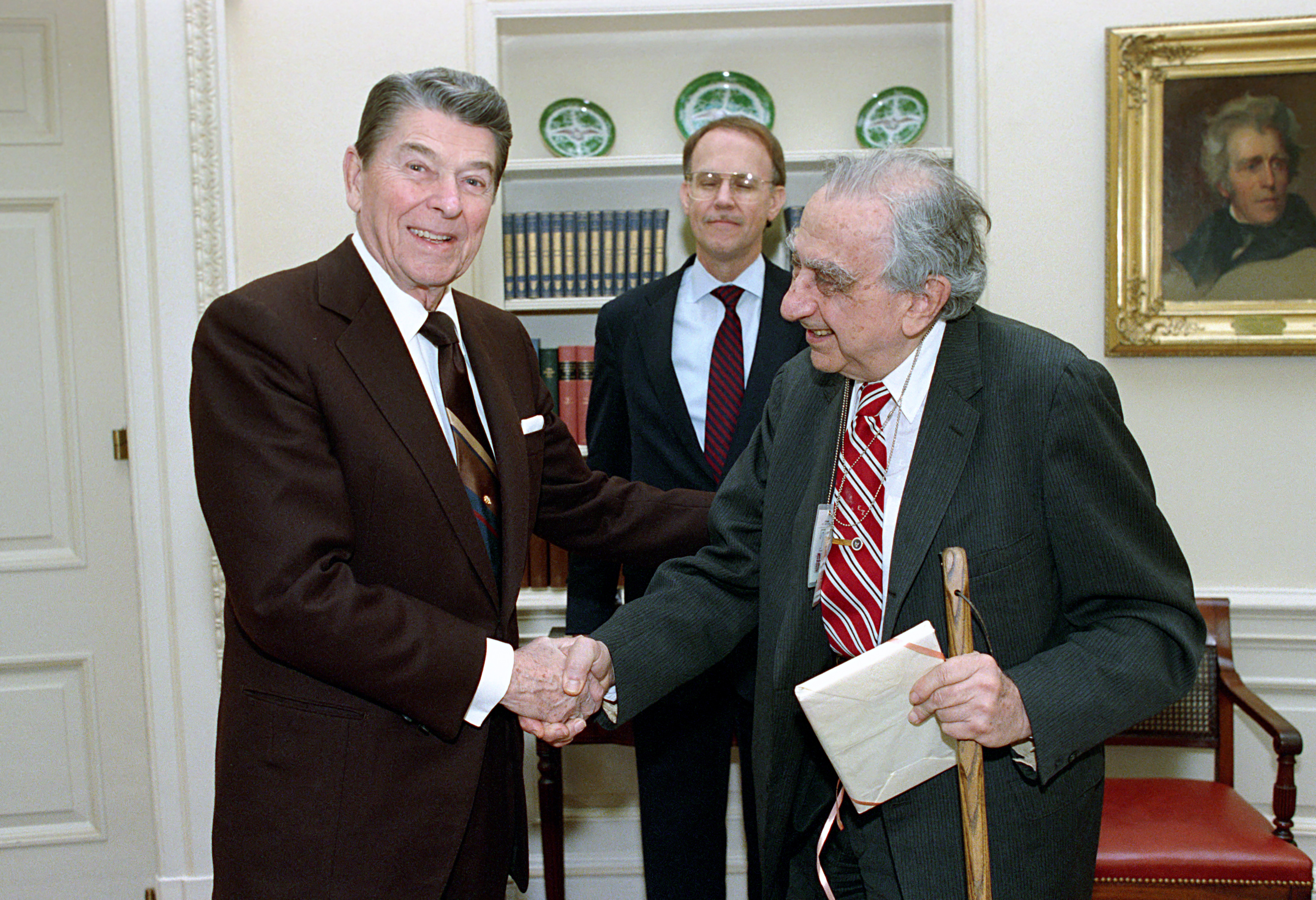
Edward Teller was a regular visitor at the White House, seen here meeting President Ronald Reagan in January 1989.

In 1986, it was reported that the SDIO saw Excalibur primarily as an anti-satellite weapon, and perhaps useful as a discrimination tool to tell warheads from decoys. This, along with the results from the most recent tests, made it clear it was no longer considered to be useful as a BMD weapon on its own. By the late 1980s, the entire concept was being derided in the press and by other members of the lab; The New York Times quoted George Maenchen as stating "All these claims are totally false. They lie in the realm of pure fantasy." The stories prompted a 60 Minutes interview with Teller, but when they began to question him on Woodruff, Teller attempted to rip off the microphone.

Funding for Excalibur peaked in 1987 at $349 million and then began to rapidly reverse. The March 1988 budget ended development as a weapon system, and the original R group was shut down. In the 1990 budget, Congress eliminated it as a separate item. X-ray laser research continued at LLNL, but as a purely scientific project, not as a weapons program. Another test, Greenwater, had already been planned but was ultimately canceled. In total, ten underground tests were used in the development program.

=== Brilliant Pebbles begins ===
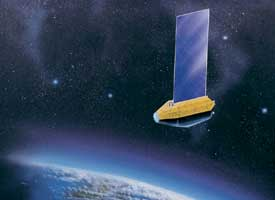
Brilliant Pebbles replaced Excalibur as LLNL's contribution to the SDI efforts, becoming the centerpiece of post-SDI programs until the majority of original SDI concepts were canceled in 1993.

With Excalibur effectively dead, in 1987 Teller and Wood began pitching Wood's new concept, Brilliant Pebbles. (Note: Or as congressman Charles Bennett insisted, "loose marbles", a euphemism for insanity.) They first presented this to Abrahamson in October and followed up with a March 1988 meeting with Reagan and his aides. The new concept used a fleet of about a hundred thousand small independent rockets weighing about 5 pounds (2.3 kg) each to destroy the missiles or warheads by colliding with them, no explosive required. Because they were independent, attacking them would require an equally huge number of interceptors. Better yet, the entire system could be developed in a few years and would cost $10 billion for a complete fleet.

Brilliant Pebbles was essentially an updated version of the Project BAMBI concepts Graham had been suggesting in 1981. At that time, Teller had continually derided the idea as "outlandish" and used his influence to ensure the concept did not receive serious attention. Ignoring his previous concerns with the concept, Teller went on to promote Brilliant Pebbles using arguments he had previously dismissed when raised about Excalibur; among them, he now stressed that the system did not place or explode nuclear weapons in space. When critics said the idea fell prey to the issues raised by the Union of Concerned Scientists, Teller simply ignored them.

In spite of all of these red flag issues, and the decades-long string of Air Force and DARPA reports suggesting the concept just would not work, Reagan once again enthusiastically embraced their latest concept. By 1989 the weight of each pebble had grown to 100 pounds (45 kg) and the cost of a small fleet of 4,600 of them had ballooned to $55 billion. It remained the centerpiece of the US BMD efforts into 1991 when the numbers were further cut to somewhere between 750 and 1,000. President Clinton indirectly canceled the project on 13 May 1993 when the SDI office was reorganized as the Ballistic Missile Defense Organization (BMDO) and focused their efforts on theater ballistic missiles.

=== Teller, SDI and Reykjavík ===
Depending on whose version of the events you read, the nearly complete disarmament of all strategic weapons may have foundered due to Reagan's desire to continue developing Excalibur.

Throughout SDI's history, journalist William Broad of The New York Times was highly critical of the program and Teller's role within it. His works have generally ascribed the entire basis for SDI to Teller's overselling of the Excalibur concept, convincing Reagan a credible defensive system was only a few years away. According to Broad, "Over the protests of colleagues, Teller misled the highest officials of the United States Government into the deadly folly known as Star Wars [the nickname for SDI]."

In particular, Broad points to the meeting between Teller and Reagan in September 1982 as the key moment in SDI's creation. Years later, Broad described the meeting this way: "For half an hour, Teller deployed X-ray lasers all over the Oval Office, reducing hundreds of incoming Soviet missiles to radioactive chaff, while Reagan, gazing up ecstatically, saw a crystal shield, covering the Last Hope of Man."

This basic telling of the story is recounted in other contemporary sources; in their biography, Edward Teller: Giant of The Golden Age of Physics, Blumberg and Panos essentially make the same statement, as does Robert Park in his Voodoo Science. A Washington Post article by Patrick Tyler noted "Only Ronald Reagan could tell us if Edward Teller was the key influence on his decision to challenge American scientists to invent new defenses that would make nuclear weapons 'obsolete,' and so far the president isn't saying. But there is no doubt that Teller's views have been important, and his fellow physicists speak with increasing certainty about the private advice they believe Teller has been giving to Reagan about a new generation of super weapons potentially as significant as the H-bomb."

Others give less credence to Teller's persuasive capabilities; Ray Pollock, who was present at the meeting, described in a 1986 letter that "I sat in on the mid-September 1982 meeting Teller had in the Oval Office ... Teller got a warm reception but that is all. I had the feeling he confused the president." In particular, he notes Teller's opening comment about "Third generation, third generation!" (Note: "Third generation weapon" was a term Teller used to describe nuclear weapons that focused their output at particular targets, as opposed to traditional designs where the energy was released in all directions. The term was not widely used by others in the field, although it appears in later works.) as being a point of confusion. Keyworth was later quoted as calling the meeting "a disaster". Others report that Teller's bypassing of official channels to arrange the meeting angered Caspar Weinberger and other members of the Department of Defense.

Others debate Excalibur's role in SDI from the start. Park suggests that Reagan's "kitchen cabinet" was pushing for some sort of action on BMD even before this period. Charles Townes suggested the key impetus to move forward was not Teller, but a presentation by the Joint Chiefs of Staff made only a few weeks before his speech that suggested shifting some development funding to defensive systems. Reagan mentioned this during the speech introducing SDI. Nigel Hey points to Robert McFarlane and the United States National Security Council as a whole. In a 1999 interview with Hey, Teller himself would suggest that he had little to do with the president's decision to announce SDI. He also did not want to talk about the X-ray laser and said he did not even recognize the name "Excalibur".

There is considerable debate on whether or not Excalibur had a direct effect on the failure of the Reykjavík Summit. During the October 1986 meeting, Reagan and Mikhail Gorbachev initially considered the issue of the destabilizing effect of intermediate-range missiles in Europe. As both proposed various ideas to eliminate them, they quickly began to ratchet up the numbers and types of weapons being considered. Gorbachev started with his acceptance of Reagan's 1981 "double zero option" for intermediate-range missiles but then countered with an additional offer to eliminate fifty percent of all nuclear-armed missiles. Reagan then countered with an offer to eliminate all such missiles within ten years, as long as the US was free to deploy defensive systems after that period. At that point, Gorbachev offered to eliminate all nuclear weapons of any sort within that same time period.

At this point SDI came into the negotiations. Gorbachev would consider such a move only if the US limited their SDI efforts to the laboratory for ten years. Excalibur, which Teller's letter of only a few days earlier once again said was ready to enter engineering, would need to be tested in space before that point. Reagan refused to back down on this issue, as did Gorbachev. Reagan attempted one last time to break the logjam, asking if he would really "turn down a historic opportunity because of a single word" ("laboratory"). Gorbachev said it was a matter of principle; if the US continued real-world testing while the Soviets agreed to dismantle their weapons, he would return to Moscow to be considered a fool.

== Physics ==
=== Lasers ===
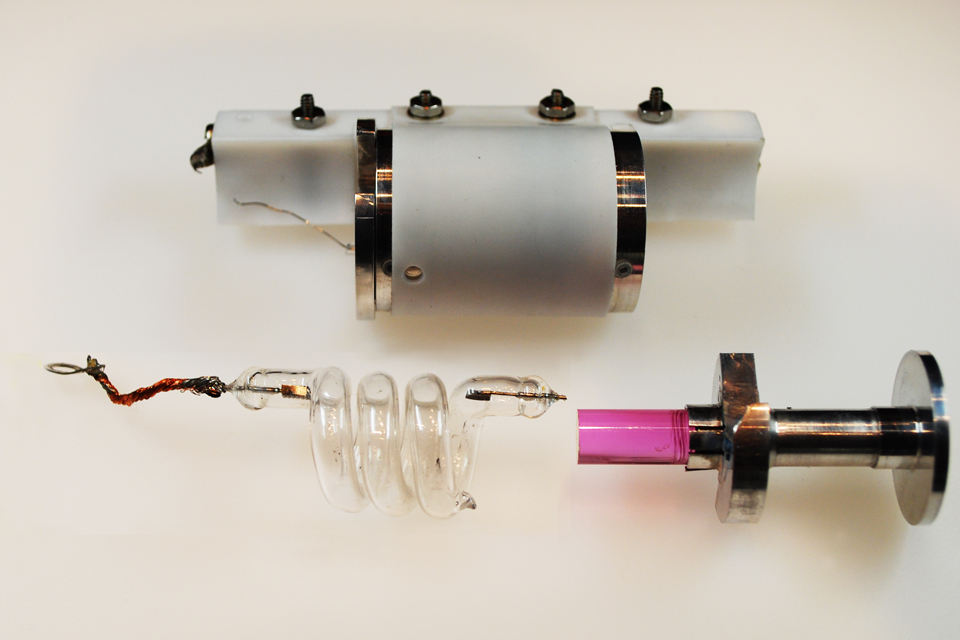
A ruby laser is a very simple device, consisting of the ruby (right), flash tube (left-center), and casing (top). An X-ray laser is similar in concept, with the ruby replaced by one or more metal rods, and the flash tube by a nuclear bomb.

Lasers rely on two physical phenomena to work, stimulated emission and population inversion.

An atom is made of a nucleus and a number of electrons orbiting in shells around it. Electrons can be found in many discrete energy states, defined by quantum mechanics. The energy levels depend on the structure of the nucleus, so they vary from element to element. Electrons can gain or lose energy by absorbing or emitting a photon with the same energy as the difference between two allowable energy states. This is why different elements have unique spectrums and gives rise to the science of spectroscopy.

Electrons will naturally release photons if there is an unoccupied lower energy state. An isolated atom would normally be found in the ground state, with all of its electrons in their lowest possible state. But due to the surrounding environment adding energy, the electrons will be found in a range of energies at any given instant. Electrons that are not in the lowest possible energy state are known as "excited", as are the atoms that contain them.

Stimulated emission occurs when an excited electron can drop by the same amount of energy as a passing photon. This causes a second photon to be emitted, closely matching the original's energy, momentum, and phase. Now there are two photons, doubling the chance that they will cause the same reaction in other atoms. As long as there is a large population of atoms with electrons in the matching energy state, the result is a chain reaction that releases a burst of single-frequency, highly collimated light.

The process of gaining and losing energy is normally random, so under typical conditions, a large group of atoms is unlikely to be in a suitable state for this reaction. Lasers depend on some sort of setup that results in many electrons being in the desired states, a condition known as a population inversion. An easy to understand example is the ruby laser, where there is a metastable state where electrons will remain for a slightly longer period if they are first excited to even higher energy. This is accomplished through optical pumping, using the white light of a flash lamp to increase the electron energy to a blue-green or ultraviolet frequency. The electrons then rapidly lose energy until they reach the metastable energy level in the deep red. This results in a brief period where a large number of electrons lie at this medium energy level, resulting in a population inversion. At that point any one of the atoms can emit a photon at that energy, starting the chain reaction.

=== X-ray lasers ===
An X-ray laser works in the same general fashion as a ruby laser, but at much higher energy levels. The main problem in producing such a device is that the probability of any given transition between energy states depends on the cube of the energy. Comparing a ruby laser that operates at 694.3 nm to a hypothetical soft X-ray laser that might operate at 1 nm, this means the X-ray transition is 694^{3}, or a little over 334 million times less likely. To provide the same total output energy, one needs a similar increase in input energy.

Another problem is that the excited states are extremely short-lived: for a 1 nm transition, the electron will remain in the state for about 10^{-14} seconds. Without a metastable state to extend this time, this means there is only this fleeting time, much less than a shake, to carry out the reaction. A suitable substance with a metastable state in the X-ray region is unknown in the open literature. (Note: Although chlorine atoms are reported to have such a state, a dedicated X-ray laser using this technique does not appear in the literature. While atoms with such a state are unknown, metastable inner-shell molecular state molecules often have energy levels in the X-ray region and have been used for high-energy X-ray sources.)

Instead, X-ray lasers rely on the speed of various reactions to create the population inversion. When heated beyond a certain energy level, electrons dissociate from their atoms entirely, producing a gas of nuclei and electrons known as a plasma. Plasma is a gas, and its energy causes it to adiabatically expand according to the ideal gas law. As it does, its temperature drops, eventually reaching a point where the electrons can reconnect to nuclei. The cooling process causes the bulk of the plasma to reach this temperature at roughly the same time. Once reconnected to nuclei, the electrons lose energy through the normal process of releasing photons. Although rapid, this release process is slower than the reconnection process. This results in a brief period where there are a large number of atoms with the electrons in the high-energy just-reconnected state, causing a population inversion.

To produce the required conditions, a huge amount of energy needs to be delivered extremely rapidly. It has been demonstrated that something on the order of 1 watt per atom is needed to provide the energy required to produce an X-ray laser. Delivering so much energy to the lasing medium invariably means it will be vaporized, but the entire reaction occurs so rapidly this is not necessarily a problem. It does imply such systems will be inherently one-shot devices.

Finally, another complication is that there is no effective mirror for X-ray frequency light. In a common laser, the lasing medium is normally placed between two partial mirrors that reflect some of the output back into the medium. This greatly increases the number of photons in the medium and increases the chance that any given atom will be stimulated. More importantly, as the mirrors reflect only those photons traveling in a particular direction, and the stimulated photons will be released in the same direction, this causes the output to be highly focused.

Lacking either of these effects, the X-ray laser has to rely entirely on stimulation as the photons travel through the medium only once. To increase the odds that any given photon causes stimulation, and to focus the output, X-ray lasers are designed to be very long and skinny. In this arrangement, most of the photons being released naturally through conventional emissions in random directions will simply exit the medium. Only those photons that happen to be released traveling down the long axis of the medium have a reasonable chance of stimulating another release. A suitable lasing medium would have an aspect ratio on the order of 10,000. (Note: For comparison, a standard US #5 rebar is 5/8 of an inch across. A standard 20 foot (6.1 m) length thus has an aspect ratio of (20 x 12) / (5/8) = 384. Thus the required aspect ratio of a laser medium is more on the order of an extremely thin fibre than common objects.)

=== Excalibur ===
Although most details of the Excalibur concept remain classified, articles in Nature and Reviews of Modern Physics, along with those in optics-related journals, contain broad outlines of the underlying concepts and outline possible ways to build an Excalibur system.

The basic concept would require one or more lasing rods arranged into a module along with a tracking camera. These would be arranged on a framework surrounding the nuclear weapon in the center. Nature's description shows multiple lasing rods embedded in a plastic matrix forming a cylinder around the bomb and tracking device, meaning each device would be able to attack a single target. The accompanying text, however, describes it as having several aimable modules, perhaps four. Most other descriptions show multiple modules arranged around the bomb that can be separately aimed, which more closely follows the suggestions of there being several dozen such lasers per device.

In order to damage the airframe of an ICBM, an estimated 3 kJ/cm^{2} would need to hit it. The laser is essentially a focusing device, taking the radiation falling along the length of the rod and turning some small amount of it into a beam traveling out the end. One can consider the effect as increasing the brightness of the X-rays falling on the target compared to the X-rays released by the bomb itself. The enhancement of the brightness compared to the unfocused output from the bomb is $\eta/d\theta$, where $\eta$ is the efficiency of conversion from bomb X-rays to laser X-rays, and $d\theta$ is the dispersion angle.

If a typical ICBM is 1 metre (3 ft 3 in) in diameter, at a distance of 1,000 kilometers (620 mi) represents a solid angle of 10^{−12} steradian (sr). Estimates of the dispersion angles from the Excalibur lasers were from 10^{−12} to 10^{−9}. Estimates of $\eta$ vary from about 10^{−5} to 10^{−2}; that is, they have laser gain less than one. In the worst-case scenario, with the widest dispersion angle and the lowest enhancement, the pump weapon would have to be approximately 1 Mt for a single laser to deposit enough energy on the booster to be sure to destroy it at that range. Using best-case scenarios for both values, about 10 kt are required.

The exact material of the lasing medium has not been specified. The only direct statement from one of the researchers was by Chapline, who described the medium on the original Diablo Hawk test being "an organic pith material" from a weed growing on a vacant lot in Walnut Creek, a town a short distance away from Livermore. Various sources describe the later tests using metals; selenium, zinc and aluminum have been mentioned specifically.

== BMD ==
=== Missile-based systems ===
The US Army ran an ongoing BMD program dating from the 1940s. This was initially concerned with shooting down V-2-like targets, but an early study on the topic by Bell Labs suggested their short flight times would make it difficult to arrange an interception. The same report noted that the longer flight times of long-range missiles made this task simpler, despite various technical difficulties due to higher speeds and altitudes.

This led to a series of systems starting with Nike Zeus, then Nike-X, Sentinel and finally the Safeguard Program. These systems used short and medium-range missiles equipped with nuclear warheads to attack incoming enemy ICBM warheads. The constantly changing concepts reflect their creation during a period of rapid changes in the opposing force as the Soviet ICBM fleet was expanded. The interceptor missiles had a limited range, less than 500 miles (800 km), (Note: The Spartan, the longest-range US ABM, had a maximum range of about 450 miles (720 km).) so interceptor bases had to be spread across the United States. Since the Soviet warheads could be aimed at any target, adding a single ICBM, which were becoming increasingly inexpensive in the 1960s, would (theoretically) require another interceptor at every base to counter it.

This led to the concept of the cost-exchange ratio, the amount of money one had to spend on additional defenses to counter a dollar of new offensive capability. Early estimates in the late 1950s were around 20, meaning every dollar the Soviets spent on new ICBMs would require the US to spend $20 to counter it. This implied the Soviets could afford to overwhelm the US's ability to build more interceptors. With the introduction of MIRV in the 1960s, the cost-exchange ratio became so one-sided there was no effective defense that could not be overwhelmed with little effort. This is precisely what the US did when the Soviets installed their A-35 anti-ballistic missile system around Moscow; by adding MIRV to the Minuteman missile fleet, they could overwhelm the A-35 without adding a single new missile.

=== X-ray based attacks ===
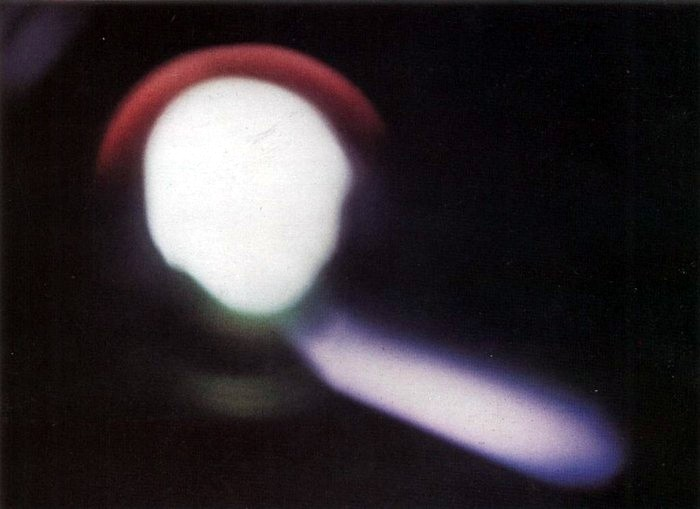
Studies of high-altitude nuclear explosions such as the Kingfish shot of Operation Fishbowl inspired the concept of X-rays attacks.

During high-altitude tests in the late 1950s and early 1960s, it was noticed that the burst of X-rays from a nuclear explosion were free to travel long distances, unlike low altitude bursts where the air interacted with the X-rays within a few tens of meters. This led to new and unexpected effects. It also led to the possibility of designing a bomb specifically to increase the X-ray release, which could be made so powerful the rapid deposit of energy on a metal surface would cause it to explosively vaporize. At ranges on the order of 10 miles (16 km), this would have enough energy to destroy a warhead.

This concept formed the basis of the LIM-49 Spartan missile and its W71 warhead. Due to the large volume in which the system was effective, it could be used against warheads hidden among radar decoys. When decoys are deployed along with the warhead they form a threat tube about a 1 mile (1.6 km) wide and as much as ten miles long. Previous missiles had to get within a few hundred yards (meters) to be effective, but with Spartan, one or two missiles could be used to attack a warhead anywhere within this cloud of material. This also greatly reduced the accuracy needed for the missile's guidance system; the earlier Zeus had a maximum effective range of about 75 miles (121 km) due to the limits of the resolution of the radar systems, beyond this it did not have enough accuracy to stay within its lethal radius.

The use of X-ray based attacks in earlier generation BMD systems had led to work to counter these attacks. In the US, these were carried out by placing a warhead (or parts of it) in a cavern connected by a long tunnel to a second cavern where an active warhead was placed. Before firing, the entire site was pumped into a vacuum. When the active warhead fired, the X-rays traveled down the tunnel to hit the target warhead. To protect the target from the blast itself, huge metal doors slammed shut in the tunnel in the short time between the X-rays arriving and the blast wave behind it. Such tests had been carried out continuously since the 1970s.

=== Boost-phase attacks ===
A potential solution to the problem of MIRV is to attack the ICBMs during the boost phase before the warheads have separated. This destroys all the warheads with a single attack, rendering MIRV superfluous. Additionally, attacking during this phase allows the interceptors to track their targets using the large heat signature of the booster motor. These can be seen at distances on the order of thousands of miles, although they would be below the horizon for a ground-based sensor and thus require sensors being located in orbit.

DARPA had considered this concept starting in the late 1950s, and by the early 1960s had settled on the Ballistic Missile Boost Intercept concept, Project BAMBI. BAMBI used small heat-seeking missiles launched from orbiting platforms to attack Soviet ICBMs as they launched. To keep enough BAMBI interceptors within the range of the Soviet missiles while the interceptor's launch platforms continued to move in orbit, an enormous number of platforms and missiles would be required.

The basic concept continued to be studied through the 1960s and 1970s. A serious problem was that the interceptor missiles had to be very fast to reach the ICBM before its motor stopped firing, which required a larger motor on the interceptor, meaning higher weight to launch into orbit. As the difficulties of this problem became clear, the concept evolved into the "ascent phase" attack, which used more sensitive seekers which allowed the attack to continue after the ICBM's motor had stopped firing and the warhead bus was still ascending. In all of these studies, the system would require an enormous amount of weight to be lifted into orbit, typically hundreds of millions of pounds, well beyond any reasonable projections of US capability. The US Air Force repeatedly studied these various plans and rejected them all as essentially impossible.

=== Excalibur's promise and development issues ===
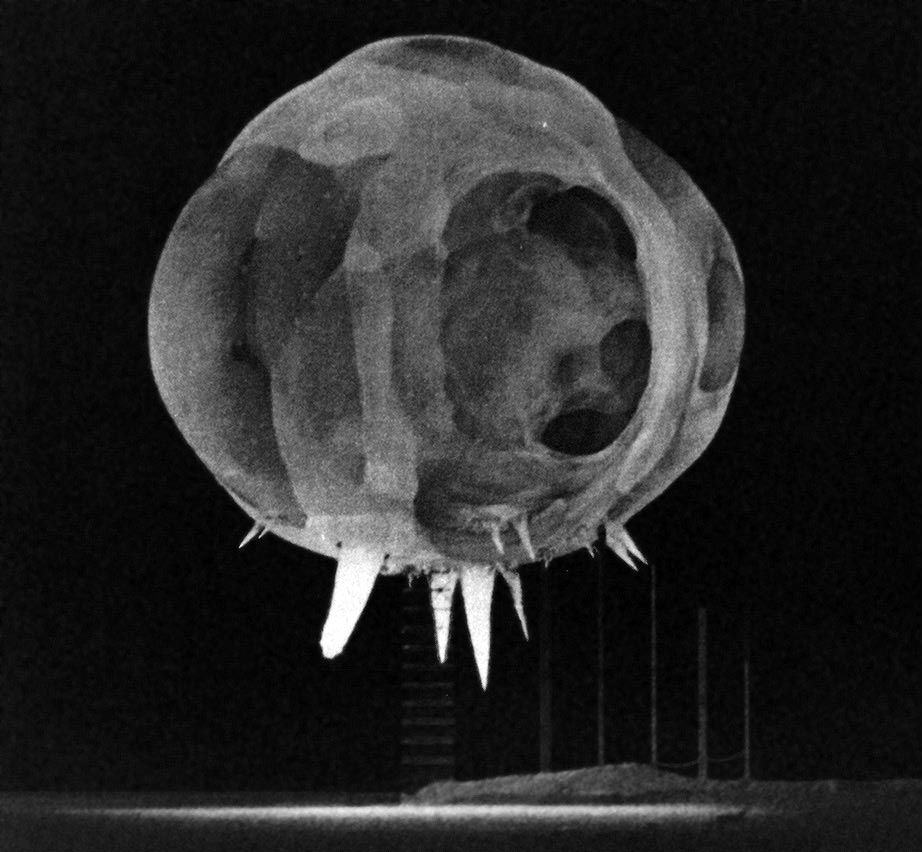
The "rope trick": X-rays released by a nuclear device heat the steel guy-wires.

The Excalibur concept appeared to represent an enormous leap in BMD capability. By focusing the output of a nuclear explosion's X-rays, the range and effective power of BMD were greatly enhanced. A single Excalibur could attack multiple targets across hundreds or even thousands of kilometers. Because the system was both small and relatively lightweight, the Space Shuttle could carry multiple Excaliburs into orbit in a single sortie. Super Excalibur, a later design, would theoretically be able to shoot down the entire Soviet missile fleet singlehandedly.

When first proposed, the plan was to place enough Excaliburs in orbit so at least one would be over the Soviet Union at all times. But it was soon noted that this allowed the Excalibur platforms to be directly attacked; in this situation, the Excalibur would either have to allow itself to absorb the attack or sacrifice itself to shoot down the attacker. In either case, the Excalibur platform would likely be destroyed, allowing a subsequent and larger attack to occur unhindered.

This led Teller to suggest a "pop-up" mode where an Excalibur would be placed on SLBM platforms on submarines patrolling off the Soviet coastline. When a launch was detected, the missiles would be launched upward and then fire as they left the atmosphere. This plan also suffered from several problems. Most notable was the issue of timing; the Soviet missiles would be firing for only a few minutes, during which time the US had to detect the launch, order a counter-launch, and then wait for the missiles to climb to altitude.

For practical reasons, submarines could salvo their missiles only over a period of minutes, which meant each one could launch only perhaps one or two Excaliburs before Soviet missiles were already on their way. Additionally, the launch would reveal the location of the submarine, leaving it a "sitting duck". These issues led the Office of Technology Assessment to conclude that "the practicality of a global scheme involving pop-up X-ray lasers of this type is doubtful."

Another challenge was geometric in nature. For missiles launched close to the submarines, the laser would be shining through only the uppermost atmosphere. For ICBMs launched from Kazakhstan, some 3,000 kilometers (1,900 mi) from the Arctic Ocean, the curvature of the Earth meant an Excalibur's laser beam would have a long path-length through the atmosphere. To obtain a shorter atmospheric path-length, Excalibur would have to climb much higher, during which time the target missile would be able to release its warheads.

There was the possibility that a powerful enough laser could reach further into the atmosphere, perhaps as deep as 30 kilometers (19 mi) altitude if it was bright enough. In this case, there would be so many X-ray photons all the air between the battle station and the target missiles would be completely ionized and there would still be enough X-rays left over to destroy the missile. This process, known as "bleaching", would require an extremely bright laser, more than ten billion times brighter than the original Excalibur system.

Finally, another problem was aiming the lasing rods before firing. For maximum performance, the laser rods needed to be long and skinny, but this would make them less robust mechanically. Moving them to point at their targets would cause them to bend, and some time would be required to allow this deformation to disappear. Complicating the issue was that the rods needed to be as skinny as possible to focus the output, a concept known as geometric broadening, but doing so caused the diffraction limit to decrease, offsetting this improvement. Whether it was possible to meet the performance requirements within these competing limitations was never demonstrated.

=== Countermeasures ===
Excalibur worked during the boost phase and aimed at the booster itself. This meant the X-ray hardening techniques developed for warheads did not protect them. Other SDI weapons, like the Space Based Laser, required a certain amount of dwell time to deposit enough energy on the target to destroy it, often on the order of several seconds. The Soviets could force this to be much longer through simple measures like polishing the missile mirror-smooth or spinning the rocket to spread out the energy. This would require more dwell time and thus the weapon would have less time to shoot at other targets. Excalibur's zero dwell time rendered these ineffective. Thus, the primary way to defeat an Excalibur weapon is to use the atmosphere to block the progress of the beams. This can be accomplished using a missile that burns out while still in the atmosphere, thereby denying Excalibur the tracking system information needed for targeting.

The Soviets conceived of a wide array of responses during the SDI era. In 1997 Russia deployed the Topol-M ICBM which utilized a higher-thrust engine burn following take-off, and flew a relatively flat ballistic trajectory, both characteristics intended to complicate space-based sensor acquisition and interception. The Topol fires its engine for only 150 seconds, about half the time of the SS-18, and has no bus, the warhead is released seconds after the engine stops. This makes it far more difficult to attack.

In 1976, the organization now known as NPO Energia began development of two space-based platforms not unlike the SDI concepts; Skif was armed with a CO_{2} laser while Kaskad used missiles. These were abandoned, but with the announcement of SDI they were repurposed as anti-satellite weapons, with Skif being used against low-orbit objects and Kaskad against higher altitude and geostationary targets.

Some of these systems were tested in 1987 on the Polyus spacecraft. What was mounted on this spacecraft remains unclear, but either a prototype Skif-DF or a mockup was part of the system. According to interviews conducted years later, mounting the Skif laser on the Polyus was more for propaganda purposes than as an effective defense technology, as the phrase "space based laser" carried political capital. One of the statements is that Polyus would be the basis for deployment of nuclear "mines" which might be fired from outside the range of the SDI components and reach the United States within six minutes.

== See also ==
- Directed-energy weapon
