= Brilliant Pebbles =

US anti-ballistic missile system

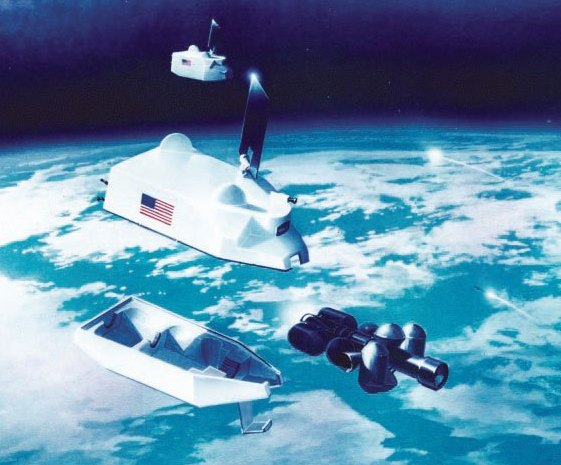
A pebble emerges from its "life jacket" just prior to launch. This is an earlier model before the GPALS upgrades.

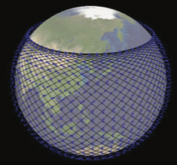
Approximately 1,600 satellites maintained in orbit for a boost-phase interception system.

Brilliant Pebbles was a United States space-based ballistic missile defense (BMD) system proposed by Lowell Wood and Edward Teller of Lawrence Livermore National Laboratory (LLNL) in 1987, near the end of the Cold War. The system would consist of thousands of small satellites, each with missiles similar to conventional heat seeking missiles, placed in low Earth orbit constellations so that hundreds would be above the Soviet Union at all times. If the Soviets launched their intercontinental ballistic missile (ICBM) fleet, the pebbles would detect their rocket motors using infrared seekers and collide with them. Because the pebble strikes the ICBM before the latter could release its warheads, each pebble could destroy several warheads with one shot.

Brilliant Pebbles is named as a play on "Smart Rocks", a concept promoted by Daniel O. Graham under the United States Strategic Defense Initiative (SDI). Smart Rocks envisioned at least 423 large orbital battle stations equipped with powerful sensors and carrying numerous small missiles. The U.S. Air Force states this was not possible due to limited space lift capabilities at the time. Edward Teller dismissed the idea as "outlandish" and vulnerable to anti-satellite attacks. But after Teller and Wood's own Excalibur – an X-ray laser system powered by a nuclear warhead – failed critical tests, Teller and Wood risked losing out on the SDI organization (SDIO) program. When SDIO realized the various directed energy weapons were nowhere near use, they revisited missile-based concepts akin to Smart Rocks. Wood introduced Pebbles, proposing that advances in sensors and microprocessors allowed missiles to operate independently without central stations, solving many of the problems with Smart Rocks.

To intercept missiles promptly, the autonomous pebbles fly in low Earth orbit. Because of these orbit's high velocities, the pebbles are over their targets only for a brief period. Consequently, many thousands of pebbles evenly distributed around the Earth are necessary to ensure sufficient coverage. Critics contend that this global distribution renders the majority of satellites ineffective during a conflict, thereby making the system less efficient compared to localized or regional missile defense systems.

Pebbles replaced Rocks as the baseline SDI design and in 1991 it was ordered into production and became the "crowning achievement of the Strategic Defense Initiative". By this time the Soviet Union was collapsing and the perceived threat changed to shorter-range theatre ballistic missiles. Pebbles was modified, but doing so raised its weight and cost; the original design called for around 10,000 missiles and would cost US$10 to $20 billion, but by 1990 the cost for 4,600 had ballooned to $55 billion. (Note: $55 billion was the price of the entire system, including the ground-based missiles and various sensor platforms. The price of the Pebbles alone is difficult to isolate but various sources put it close to $35 billion.) Fighting in Congress through the early 1990s led to Pebbles' cancellation in 1993, but elements of the concept re-emerged with the Space Development Agency in 2019, and later in 2025 with the Golden Dome.

== History ==
=== Smart Rocks ===
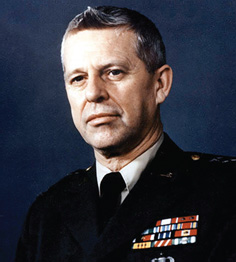
Daniel Graham proposed the Smart Rocks concept that ultimately led to Brilliant Pebbles.

There are a wide variety of stories about the origins of Ronald Reagan's Strategic Defense Initiative. According to one often repeated tale, it was Reagan's viewing of Alfred Hitchcock's Torn Curtain that did it. Edward Teller instead pointed to a talk he gave on the topic of BMD in 1967 that Reagan attended. Others point to Reagan's visit to the Cheyenne Mountain Complex in 1979; there he saw the systems that could detect a Soviet launch and then track their warheads. When he asked what they could do in that situation, the answer was "launch our own missiles". Whatever the source, Reagan was convinced that mutual assured destruction (MAD) was ridiculous, dismissing it as the international equivalent of a suicide pact.

Reagan asked Daniel O. Graham, his military advisor during the 1980 presidential campaign and former director of the Defense Intelligence Agency, to look for possible solutions. At first, Graham proposed a system of crewed space fighters, but the idea was quickly dismissed. Next, he revived the 1960s Project BAMBI to be the basis of a new system he referred to as Smart Rocks. This concept used "battle stations" in low Earth orbit, each carrying several dozen small missiles similar to a conventional heat-seeking air-to-air missile. The platforms would carry advanced sensors to detect and track Soviet ICBMs as they launched, and then launch its missiles and guide them until the missile's own infrared sensors picked up the ICBM. As the ICBM rocket engine was extremely bright in infrared, even a very simple interceptor missile could successfully track them.

As the interceptors were relatively small and carried a limited amount of rocket fuel, they could only attack ICBMs within a limited range of the stations. This meant the stations had to be in low orbit, to keep them close to their targets. At these altitudes, the stations moved at speeds around 17,000 miles per hour (27,000 km/h) compared to the surface of the Earth. At that rate, any given station would spend only a few minutes over the Soviet Union. To ensure there were enough stations in the right locations at any given time, hundreds of stations were needed. The Air Force noted that there was nowhere near enough launch capacity to build such a system, and even if it could be launched, maintaining it would cost at least $30 billion a year in 1963 dollars (equivalent to $315 billion in 2025). Additionally, it was noted that there was no effective way to protect the stations against attacks by anti-satellite weapons (ASATs), and the Soviets could easily afford to launch one for each platform.

Although twenty years had elapsed since BAMBI had first been studied and the concept had been re-examined several times, no obvious solution to these problems had presented itself. The Smart Rocks proposal, now known officially as Global Ballistic Missile Defense, ignored all of these problems, presenting a bare minimum of information. One observer derided the concept as being "one view-graph deep" and "unencumbered by practical engineering considerations or the laws of physics". In spite of this, Graham soon found a group of like-minded Republicans who formed a group known as the High Frontier Panel to help develop and support his idea. The group was led by Karl Bendetsen and began meeting in a room provided by The Heritage Foundation.

=== Excalibur ===
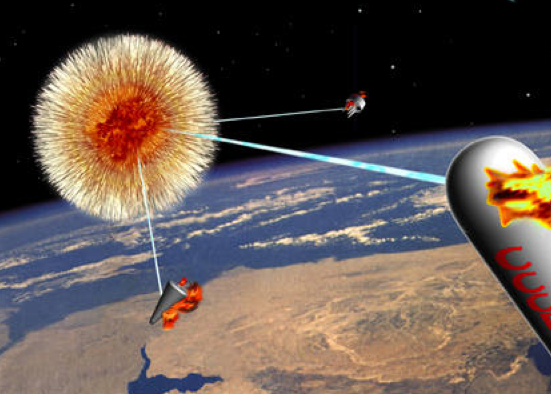
Concept art of Excalibur. Had it worked, would have been able to attack multiple ICBMs in a single shot.

Around the same time that Graham was formulating his Smart Rocks concept, studies into X-ray lasers at Lawrence Livermore National Laboratory (LLNL or Livermore) made an apparent breakthrough. Nuclear explosions give off massive amounts of X-ray energy, and it appeared possible these could be focused down into narrow beams as the basis for a long-range laser weapon. Previous systems had used carbon-based lasing materials, but calculations showed that the energy could be greatly increased by using a metal rod instead. The idea had been largely theoretical until a key test of the new concept in November 1980.

By surrounding a nuclear warhead with dozens of rods, each could be independently aimed to shoot down an enemy missile. A single such warhead might be able to destroy 50 missiles in a radius of 1,000 kilometers (620 mi) around it. A small fleet of such warheads could seriously disrupt any Soviet attack. In February 1981, Teller and Wood traveled to Washington to pitch the idea of a Manhattan Project-level development effort to produce these weapons in what they called Project Excalibur.

Teller was also a member of the High Frontier group and began attacking Graham's Smart Rocks as "outlandish", and suggested his own Excalibur be used in its place. Graham countered by pointing out a serious flaw in Excalibur; he noted that it worked by blowing itself up, so in the event a Soviet anti-satellite weapon approached, it could either blow itself up to attack the ASAT, or allow itself to be blown up by the ASAT. In either case, the Excalibur would be destroyed. Teller soon returned with a solution. In this concept, the Excalibur weapons would be placed on missiles on submarines and launched when needed.

Seeing himself increasingly sidelined, Graham left the group in December 1981 to form High Frontier Inc. In March 1982, they published a glossy book on the topic. It claimed that the system could be "fully deployed within five or six years at a minimum cost of some $10–$15 billion". A pre-publication copy was sent to the Air Force, who dismissed it, saying that it "had no technical merit and should be rejected".

=== Early failures, APS report ===
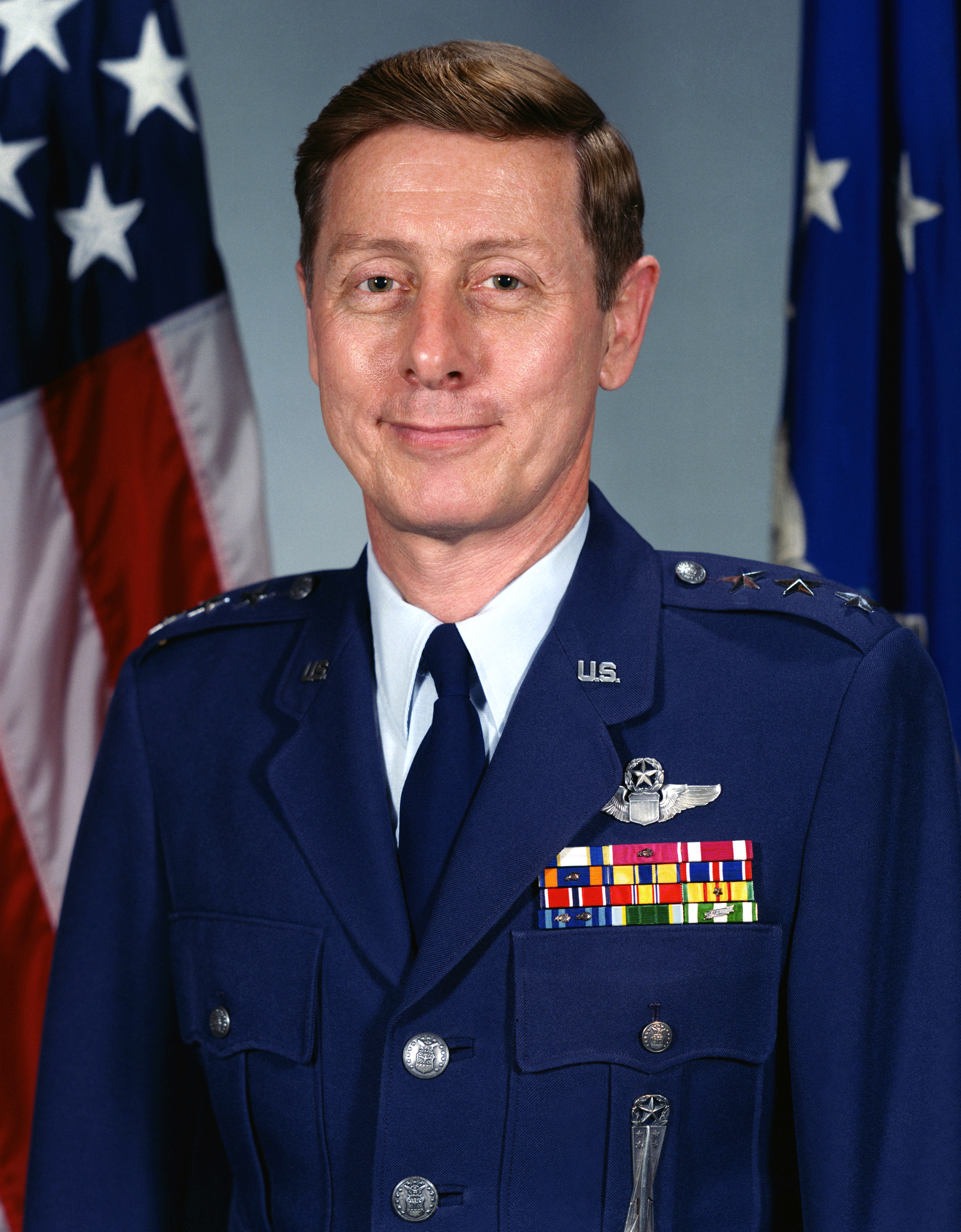
James Abrahamson, director of the SDIO, initially dismissed the Smart Rocks concept, but later selected a modified version for the SDI mission.

On 23 March 1983, Reagan gave his famous "Star Wars" speech that called on the scientists of the United States to build defenses that would render nuclear weapons obsolete. Over the next year this was formalized as the Strategic Defense Initiative Office (SDIO) as a separate branch under the Department of Defense, and soon, many of the United States weapons laboratories and major defense contractors were exploring a variety of systems to meet this goal. Along with Excalibur and the space-based laser, new proposals included ground-based lasers, various particle-beam weapons and nuclear shaped charges. (Note: The APS report provides a good overview of many of the major technologies that were considered during the early stages of the SDI program.)

Through the early phases of SDI, the Smart Rocks concept was ignored by the SDIO. A study by research scientist Ashton Carter (to become Secretary of Defense much later) concluded that the system had "extremely limited capability for boost phase intercept of present Soviet ICBMs and no capability against future MX-like Soviet boosters, even with no Soviet effort to overcome the defense". Graham's connections in Washington's political circles meant the concept was well known in spite of any official indifference. This led to a constant stream of questions by politicians to the SDIO about the system and why they were not working on it. In 1985, Sam Nunn asked James A. Abrahamson, director of the SDIO, about it once again. Abrahamson stated that "he would not recommend that the United States proceed to deploy it".

By 1986, many of the systems being studied had run into difficulties. Among these was Teller's Excalibur, which failed several critical tests in 1986. A similar test carried out by skeptical physicists at Los Alamos National Laboratory suggested there was no lasing going on at all. Other concepts, like the neutral beam weapon which shot hydrogen atoms near the speed of light, demonstrated performance that was so poor it was unlikely it could ever work. The best among them all was the space-based laser, but it needed to improve its beam quality by at least 100 times before it would be able to disable an ICBM.

That same year, the American Physical Society (APS) published their review of the directed-energy weapon efforts. After a lengthy declassification procedure, it was released to the public in March 1987. Compiled by a number of notables in the laser and physics community, including Nobel laureate Charles H. Townes, the lengthy report stated in no uncertain terms that none of the concepts were remotely ready for use. In every case, performance had to be improved at least a hundred times, and for some of the concepts, as much as a million times. It concluded that at least another decade of work was required before they would even know if any of the systems could ever reach the necessary performance.

=== Strategic Defense System ===
In a sudden reversal, in late 1986 Abrahamson and Secretary of Defense Caspar Weinberger agreed to proceed with a deployment option for a system that was for all intents and purposes an updated version of Smart Rocks. Named "Strategic Defense System, Phase I", or SDS for short, the concept added a ground-based interceptor that would be located in the United States, along with a host of radars and high- and low-orbit sensor satellites, all netted together with a command and control system. They briefed Reagan on the concept on 17 December 1986, and by mid-1987 had a proposal ready for review by the Defense Acquisition Board (DAB).

The system immediately faced withering criticism. As before, the newly christened "garage satellites" would be open to attack by anti-satellite weapons; a single ASAT attacking the station or its sensors could disable all of the interceptor missiles within. Although this concern had been raised before, the proponents still had no answer to this problem. But now the system added more critical elements, especially the high-orbit sensor satellites which not only had to survive, but had to be able to transmit their information at high speed to the interceptors. Disrupting any one of these many systems could render the system useless.

The $40 billion (equivalent to $100 billion in 2024) budget estimate was dismissed as "pure fantasy". Over the next year the budget continued to grow, apparently without bound, first to $60 billion (equivalent to $150 billion in 2024), to $75 billion (equivalent to $180 billion in 2024), and then reaching $100 billion by April 1988 (equivalent to $240 billion in 2024).

=== Brilliant Pebbles ===
After Excalibur's failed tests in 1986, the program was about to be defunded. At that time, Livermore had no other major SDI programs. Teller and Wood were looking for a concept that would be feasible.

The two had breakfast with Gregory Canavan, a Los Alamos physicist who worked on SDI related topics. Canavan noted that ongoing improvements meant microprocessors were on the verge of delivering supercomputer performance on a single chip. These chips were powerful enough that the processing capacity that formerly required the battle stations, or even computers on the ground, could now fit in the missiles themselves. Additionally, new sensors offered the optical resolution needed to track a missile at long range and still fit within a missile nose cone. Such a design offered an enormous advantage over the SDS; by flying freely, without a garage satellite, the interceptors could not be attacked en masse. If the Soviets wished to attack the system, they would have to launch an anti-satellite weapon for every one.

Wood began exploring the idea using back-of-the-envelope calculations. Wood's "O-group" had been working for some time on new computing systems in their S-1 project that aimed to produce a "supercomputer on a wafer". (Note: The idea of using an entire wafer for a single computer processor was in vogue at the time, see wafer scale integration.) He combined this with a new sensor system known as "Popeye". At the speeds the interceptors and ICBMs would be approaching each other, the mass of the projectile had six times the energy of an equal weight of TNT, meaning no warhead would be needed. Considering how small such a system could be scaled, he came up with a lower limit under 1 gram (0.035 oz). But if one considered armored ICBMs, a practical lower limit would be a burnout weight around 1.5 to 2.5 kilograms (3.3–5.5 lb), in order to have more than enough impact energy to destroy any conceivable fuselage.

Considering the numbers required, it appeared a fleet would have on the order of 7,000 missiles in orbit, which would keep about 700 over the Soviet Union at any given time. The ratio of the total number of missiles in orbit to those available for action was known as the absentee ratio. If one wanted complete coverage against any potential attack, the numbers could reach as high as 100,000 missiles in total. (Note: The worst-case scenario was one in which every silo-based missile was launched at the same time and all of the Soviet mobile launchers were moved to a single location to maximize their density. In that case, only those pebbles over the Soviet Union that instant would be in the right position to attack. Against a staggered launch, or one that was spread out physically, new pebbles would be arriving all the time in their individual orbits, so fewer were needed over the Soviet Union at one time.) Since the cost of each missile was expected to scale down into the $100,000 range, even the fully expanded system would cost $10 billion.

Launch costs were not part of that estimate. If the empty weight was on the order of a few kilograms, then a single Space Shuttle could launch dozens, perhaps hundreds. They were so light that some consideration was given to launching them from the ground using a railgun. Such lightweight designs would have a limited "cone of action", carrying so little rocket propellant that they could only attack targets right in front of them. A larger interceptor with more propellant could attack more targets, so smaller numbers would be needed to provide coverage. In any event, launch costs would be greatly reduced compared to the baseline system that required hundreds of battle stations, each of which weighed 30 short tons (27 t) and could only be launched one at a time.

Starting the next year, Wood had the former Excalibur team begin a more detailed study. By the fall of 1987, he had blueprints of the proposed design, a physical model to show, and computer simulations of the system in action. He also came up with a clever play on the Smart Rocks name, calling the newer, smaller, smarter concept Brilliant Pebbles. In another clever turn of phrase, one skeptical congressman would later refer to them as "loose marbles". (Note: An idiom meaning "to lose one's mind".)

=== Pebbles becomes the Strategic Defense System ===
In March 1988, Teller and Wood (on the left) present the original Pebbles concept to Reagan, Bush, Abrahamson and members of the SDIO. The model of the pebble was theatrically draped in black cloth to hide it from the reporters.

With Teller's help, Wood was able to brief Abrahamson on the concept in October 1987. Abrahamson was impressed enough to visit Livermore to view the mockups and watch the animated simulation they had created. This led to increased funding for further studies of the concept. In March 1988, Teller and Wood were able to directly brief President Reagan on the concept, taking the model pebble with them and theatrically hiding it under a black cloth when reporters were allowed to take pictures. Teller reiterated that the price for the system would be on the order of $10 billion.

In May 1988, Abrahamson initiated the Space Based Element Study in order to refine the design of SDS's Space Based Interceptor (SBI). As part of this study, he had Livermore's work considered as one of the interceptor concepts. This study agreed with the basic concept that all the required sensors could be placed on the missile. While this was going on, the United States Air Force Space Division began a similar study on the baseline Space Based Interceptor. They also concluded that the sensors could be on the missiles, greatly simplifying the stations.

For the next year, Wood and Teller ceaselessly advocated for Pebbles, to the point of it becoming something of a joke in Washington. During a briefing for reporters and congressional staff members, Charles Infosino, deputy director of the SDI architecture and analysis office, was quoted as saying "You may have seen Lowell Wood, who is responsible for this program, running around town with [a mockup] ... on a little cart." There were concerns about the changing estimates through this period; cost estimates for the pebbles were initially $100,000, but by the end of 1988 this had already risen to $500,000 to $1.5 million. Additionally, the sensor alone cost several million dollars and there was scepticism about whether this could be scaled down by a factor of 10 as Wood's estimates required.

=== Moving towards production ===
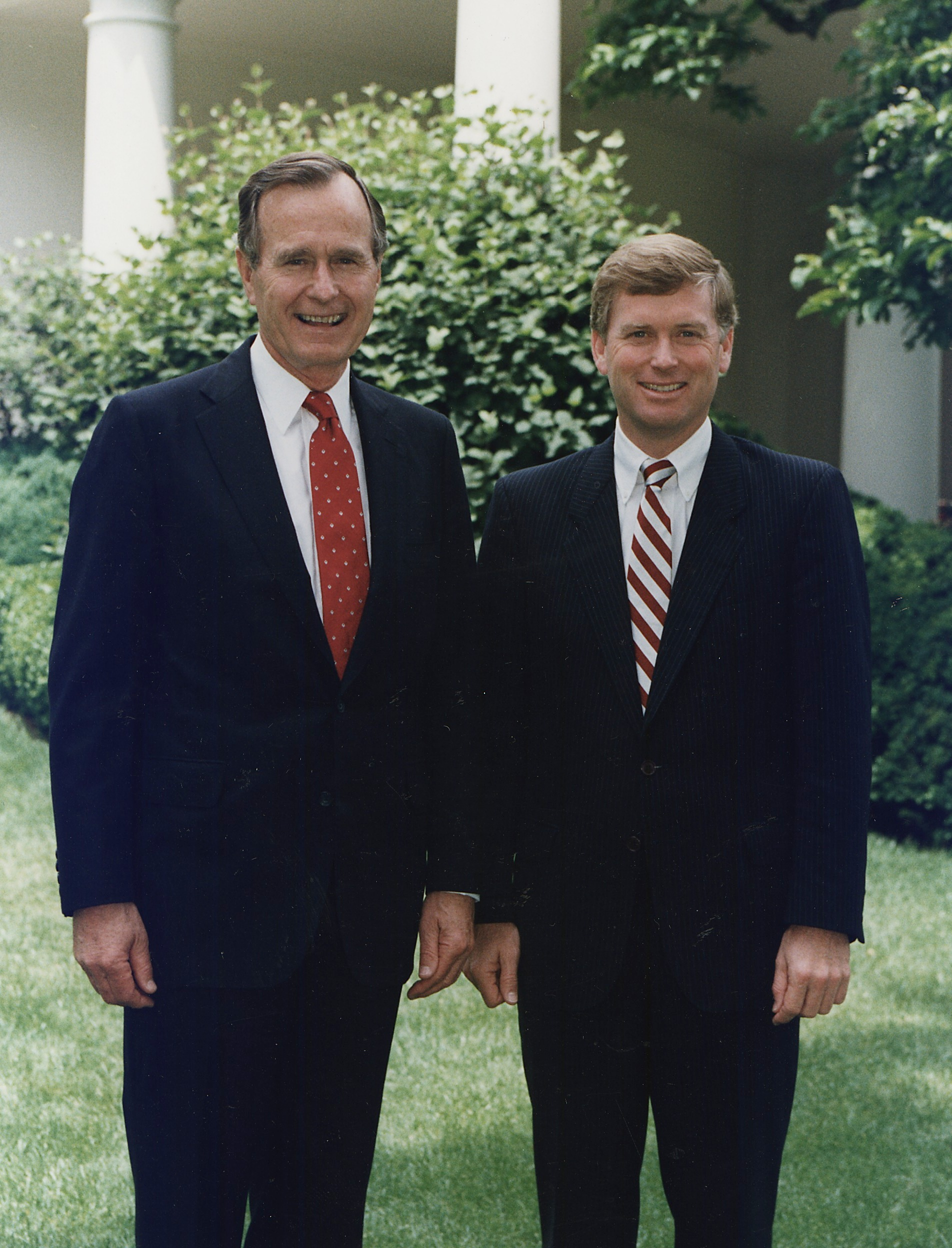
Bush and Quayle remained vocal supporters of the program as the strategic outlook changed with the ending of the Cold War.

George H. W. Bush became president in 1989, as the Cold War was coming to an end. He immediately ordered a review of all ongoing strategic programs. This led to the June 1989 National Security Directive 14, continuing the SDI program on the basis of the SDS. Meanwhile, Abrahamson's tenure at the helm of SDIO came to an end. He wrote an end-of-term report stating that Brilliant Pebbles should be aggressively pursued and that tests could be carried out within two years for a system deployment in five years at a total cost of $25 billion. Bush and Vice President Dan Quayle were vocal supporters of the Pebbles concept in the press; Quayle noted its low cost and light weight and stated that "it could revolutionize much of our thinking about strategic defense".

Abrahamson's replacement, George L. Monahan, Jr., planned a rapid series of studies with the goal of moving to approval for deployment by the end of the year. Among the first of these studies was one prepared by the JASONs, a standing committee of science advisers administered by Mitre Corporation. Their report essentially stated that there were no apparent "show stopper" issues in the concept, although they did have concerns about possible countermeasures. Soon after, a similar report by the Defense Science Board offered largely the same assessment.

A third review focussing on possible Soviet countermeasures did find that the system was possibly compromised by a number of issues, but pointed out that this was true for any other space-based system and these should not be the basis for selecting some other system over SDS. The final study, carried out late in 1989, was an Air Force report making one last comparison between the SDS concept with simplified "gun rack" garages versus a Pebbles system, which concluded the former would cost $69 billion and the latter $55 billion. This system included only 4,600 pebbles, and some of the savings were due to the removal of the high-orbit Boost Surveillance and Tracking System (BSTS), a role the pebbles themselves would fill.

Monahan had already given the DAB a "heads up" that major changes to the SDS concept were coming, and had been told to prepare a report for them for early 1990. The new system relied on Brilliant Pebbles as the baseline design. BSTS was not cancelled outright, but instead passed to the Air Force as a replacement for their existing Defense Support Program satellites. Other parts of the original design, including the land-based ERIS missile and its host of supporting radars and low-orbit satellites, remained.

Early contract tenders were sent to six suppliers for production vehicles. Testing was to run in a two-phase program, some of it in parallel. To start, LLNL would supply prototype pebbles interceptors that would be tested both on the ground and in space after launch on sounding rockets. This series would conclude in February 1993, in time to allow the President to review the system and decide whether to proceed. Information from these tests would be fed back into the production designs. The first of these prototypes would begin testing in June 1990 and end in June 1993.

=== Global Protection Against Limited Strikes ===
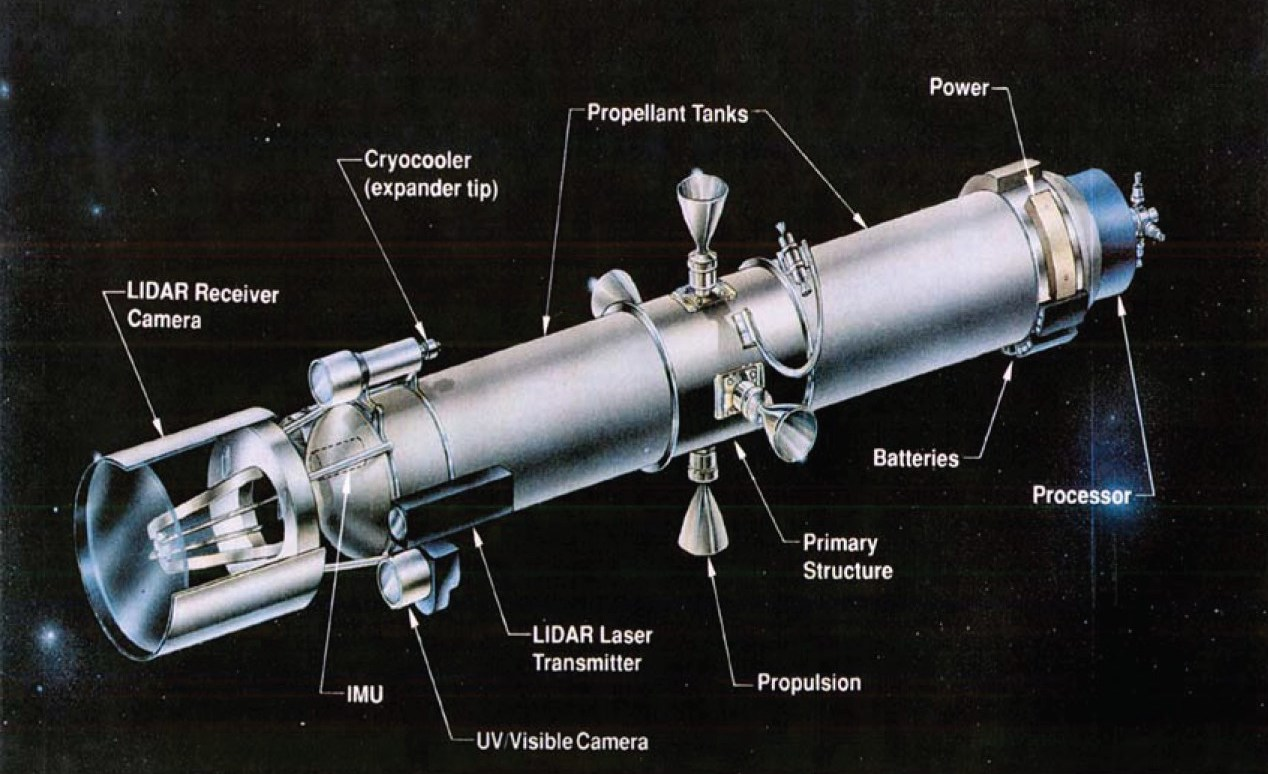
For GPALS, Brilliant Pebbles gained new sensors. The core vehicle consisted mostly of propellant tanks for the manoeuvring thrusters clustered around the center of the vehicle. The LIDAR illuminator and receiver are at the front, along with a visible and UV camera. At the rear are the batteries.

A month later, another independent review by Henry F. Cooper strongly supported Brilliant Pebbles over the alternatives. Cooper's report went much further. Considering the major changes to the strategic outlook with the ongoing dissolution of the Soviet Union, Cooper stated that the massive attack that SDS was designed to defeat was no longer the only concern, or even the main one. Instead, it was United States forces in the field that bore the brunt of the missile threat, this time from short and medium range missiles. Although the SDS system should move ahead, he suggested that the system be modified to provide defenses against these new threats.

Cooper noted that pebbles in their current form were designed to operate against a missile in the boost phase. Against a short-range rocket, this period would be too short for a pebble to reach it. To make it effective in this "Protection Against Limited missile Strikes" concept, or PALS, the pebbles should be able to continue tracking the missiles after their motors had burned out. This would either require a dramatic increase in the capability of the pebble's seekers, or require a network of low-orbit satellites to provide this same information.

Following Cooper's lead, Monahan began the Mid-and-Terminal Tiers Review (MATTR) in early 1990. Before this was complete, Cooper was appointed as the director of the SDIO on 10 July 1990, and Monahan retired. Within SDIO at least, PALS was now the mainline concept. In order to fill the need for a ground-based interceptor to back up the pebbles, the Army began development of the High Endoatmospheric Defense Interceptor (HEDI), essentially a short-range, mobile version of ERIS. A new lightweight interceptor, LEAP, would arm both ERIS and the Navy's Standard Missile.

As work continued, the Gulf War broke out and Cooper's scenario of United States troops being attacked by short range missiles came true; the nightly news carried vivid images of Scud missiles being attacked by Patriot missiles. Bush praised Patriot, claiming that 42 launches had resulted in 41 intercepts. (Note: Later analysis put the number closer to 4 hits for 42 Patriot launches.) Congress, formerly skeptical of SDI, suddenly had a very different opinion of the matter, especially with the realignment of the concept towards the PALS concept which would have been helping deal with missiles like Scud.

On 29 January 1991, Bush used the State of the Union speech to announce that SDI was being refocussed to the new "Global PALS", or GPALS, concept:

I have directed that the SDI program be refocused on providing protection from limited ballistic missile strikes – whatever their source. Let us pursue an SDI program that can deal with any future threat to the United States, to our forces overseas, and to our friends and allies.

— George Bush,

This change in posture meant the system no longer had to deal with a large-scale attack, only small ones. Once again the number of pebbles was reduced, this time to between 750 and 1,000.

=== Missile Defense Act of 1991 ===
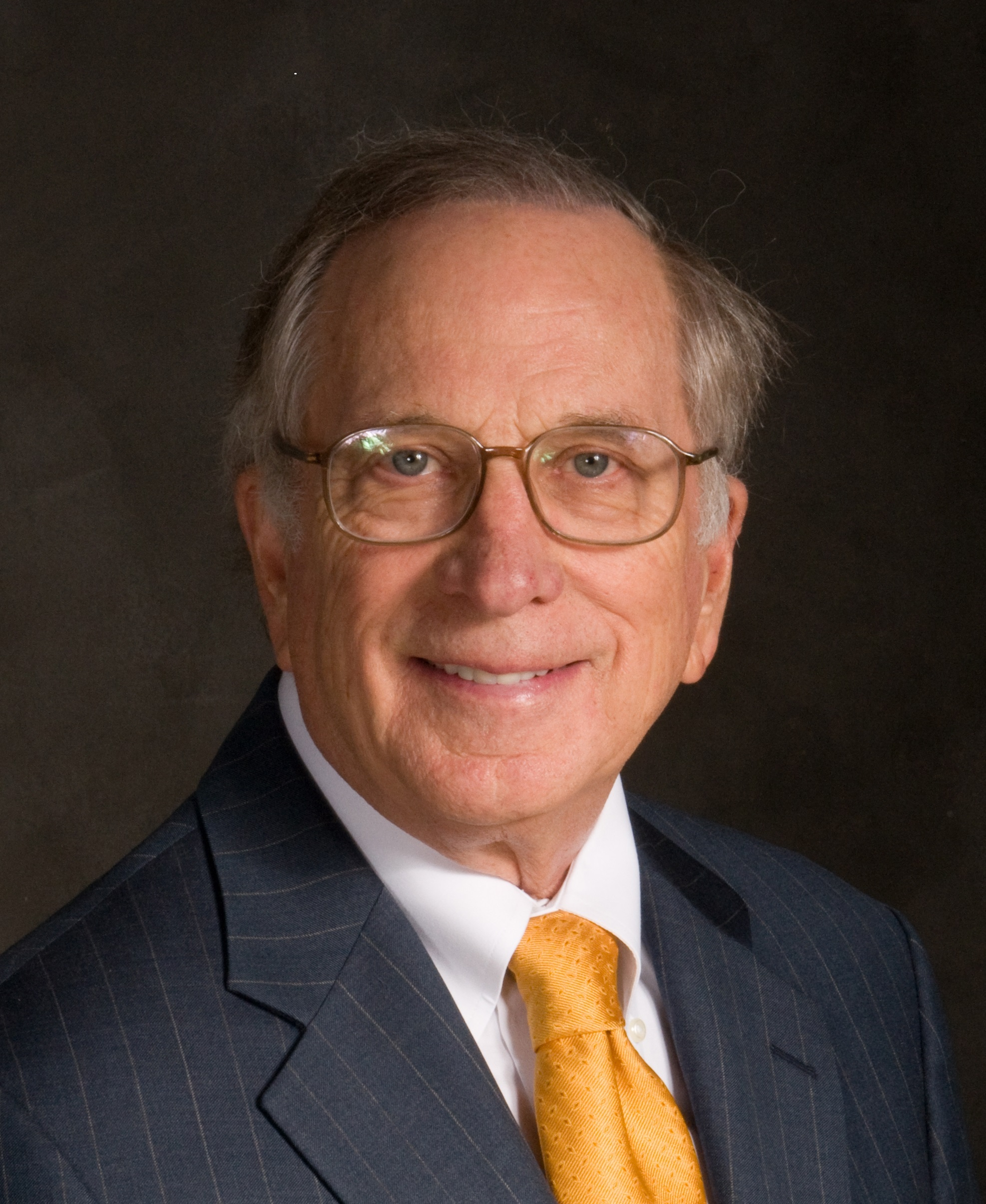
Senator Sam Nunn led the attack on Pebbles, which ultimately led to strong limitations being placed on its development.

The new GPALS concept was fully described in a May 1991 report published by the SDIO. It consisted of four parts: a ground-based missile system to protect the United States, a ground- and sea-based system to defend overseas United States forces and allies, Brilliant Pebbles in space, and a command and control system tying them all together. Brilliant Pebbles was seen as both a system for providing early detection of launches, as well as being able to attack any missile with a range greater than 600 kilometers (370 mi).

With the deployable system finally specified, the next step was to go to Congress for funding. This led to the Missile Defense Act of 1991. From one perspective, the Missile Defense Act was a victory for SDI as it considered making changes to the Anti-Ballistic Missile Treaty that would allow deployment, and ordered "robust funding" for Brilliant Pebbles. But it also stated that the immediate goal was to produce a Limited Defense System by 1996 what would be fully compliant with the Treaty, meaning it could have a maximum of 100 ground-based interceptors and they had to be in the vicinity of Grand Forks Air Force Base. It was specifically stated that Brilliant Pebbles would not be part of this initial system. Although there was some concern about the Missile Defense Act, many considered it to be the best deal that could be made.

Cooper essentially ignored the anti-Pebbles sentiment of the Missile Defense Act, and maintained its place as the primary weapon within the GPALS system. With funding secured, in June 1991 the SDIO sent out development contracts for Brilliant Pebbles and Brilliant Eyes to Martin Marietta and TRW. Brilliant Eyes was a low-orbit detection platform to aid Pebbles and the ground-based missiles. Additional contracts for the ground-based missiles and interceptors went out at the same time. This marked the first time since the Safeguard program of the 1960s that a production of a ballistic missile defense system was funded, and the first for SDI.

On 9 April 1992, Cooper testified before the Subcommittee on Strategic Forces of the Senate Armed Services Committee, where he was questioned by Democrats in the group. Sam Nunn, chairman of the Armed Services Committee, arrived late and then essentially took over the meeting. He noted that the complaints that SDIO was not being provided with the required funding was largely their problem, because Cooper was directing too much funding towards Pebbles, which would not be ready by 1996. He stated:

So, it is my assertion, Mr. Ambassador – which you can rebut – that what you've done by a combination of funding, and the reduction in GSTS, (Note: GSTS, the Ground-Based Surveillance and Tracking System, was a series of radars and other sensors that would provide tracking to the ground-based missiles.) is, you made sure that Grand Forks would not be effective if we did it during this decade. Therefore, you made it almost impossible for it to happen during this decade. I don't know the motive for that, but that's what it looks like to me.

— Sam Nunn,

In defending his priorities, Cooper stated that the budget for these items was actually within the guidelines laid out the year before, about 11% for Pebbles and 14% for the other components of the space-based portion. He went on to suggest that the 1996 date was unrealistic and that setting priorities to make it happen would not help. Seeing the implied threat to the program, Cooper soon moved $2 billion out of Pebbles into the ground-based systems. Nunn reiterated his attack on Pebbles in August, at which point Secretary of Defense Dick Cheney stepped in and threatened that if the attacks continued that the president might veto the entire bill. His position was undermined by the failure of the third Pebbles test on 22 October 1992, when the booster broke up shortly after liftoff.

The final language for the 1992 version of the bill contained Nunn's language on the focus towards the Limited Defense System. It firmed up language that stated that the deployed system would have to be fully compliant with the ABM Treaty, and reduced funding for the space-based portions from $465 million in the 1991 version to $300 million. Further, the wording that the system should be deployed as rapidly as possible was dropped.

In November 1992, SDIO was forced to remove Pebbles from the deployment contracts, sending it back to a research program. On 18 December 1992, program management was transferred to the Air Force's Space and Missile Systems Center, and the January 1993 contracts were for "advanced technology demonstration" as opposed to a pre-production system.

=== Cancellation ===
Shortly after Bill Clinton became president in 1993, his new Secretary of Defense, Les Aspin, immediately began downgrading the Pebbles system. On 2 February 1993, he issued budget guidance lowering its budget from $100 million to $75 million, and moving it to the "follow on technology" category. In March 1993, it was renamed the Advanced Interceptor Technology Program.

On 1 May 1993, the SDIO became the Ballistic Missile Defense Organization (BMDO), reflecting the administration's shift towards the theatre ballistic missile problem. On 1 December 1993, James D. Carlson, its acting deputy director, ordered a stop work on the program. This was part of significant budget rollbacks to the entire program, limiting the organization to work on a single kill-vehicle. Brilliant Pebbles was dead. In August 1994, the Ballistic Missile Defense Organization was reoriented to a single Boost Phase Interceptor program.

== Description ==
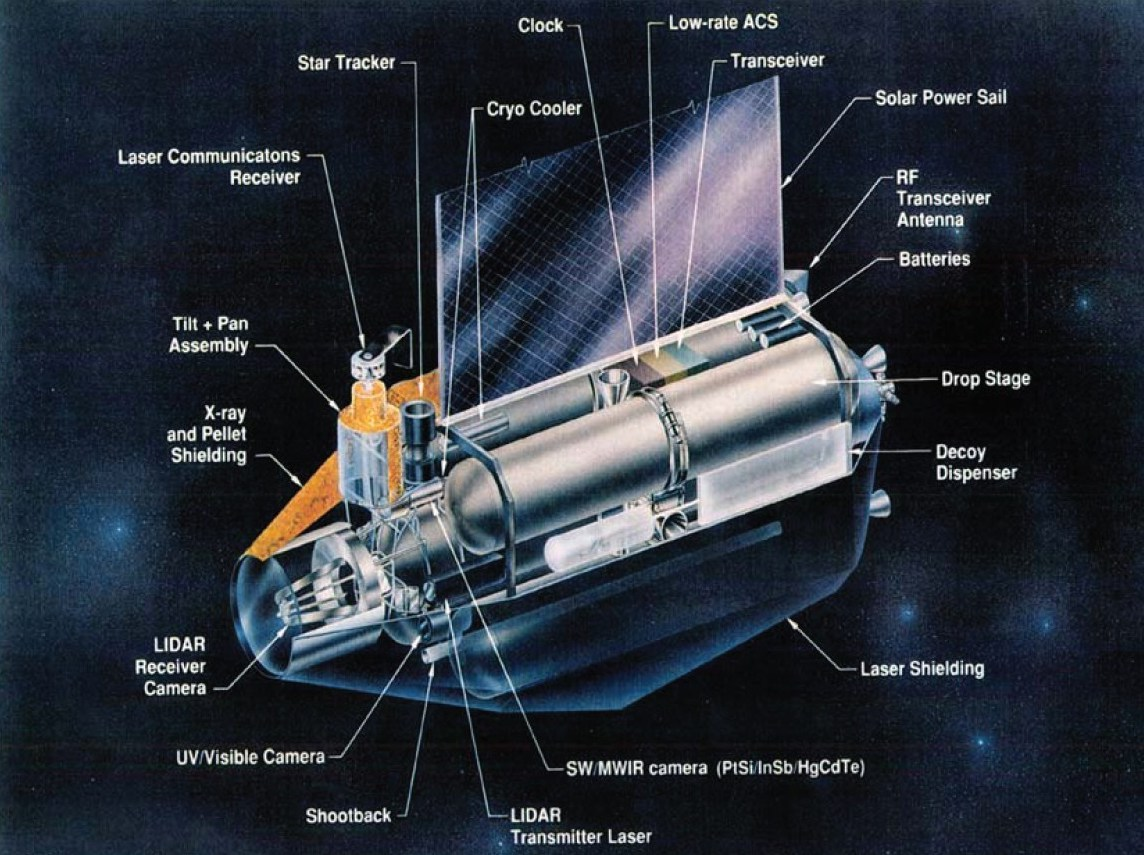
The "life jacket" protected the pebble in orbit, providing power and communications.

The final pebble design was similar to an air-to-air missile with no attempt at streamlining. The main body was about 3 feet (0.91 m) long, most of that consisting of propellant tanks for the final-stage directional controls. At the very front was the LIDAR receiver, with the laser illuminator just behind it to one side along with the UV/visible light camera. At the rear were the batteries. Forward speed was provided by a series of four boosters known as "drop stages". Each consisted of a tank about the size of the pebble's own, along with a thruster engine at the rear.

For most of its lifetime, the pebble would be held inside its "life jacket". This provided electrical power via a solar panel, included a star tracker to provide basic alignment information, and carried a laser communications transceiver. The shell itself was intended to provide protection from laser strikes and pellets from the known Soviet anti-satellite weapon, part of the Istrebitel Sputnikov program.

== Tests ==
Only three all-up tests of the Pebbles concept were carried out before the program was cancelled. All three failed for various reasons.

The first pebble test was carried out on 25 August 1990. This consisted of a basic airframe carrying an IR sensor, a star tracker and an attitude control system. It was to be launched to an altitude of 124 miles (200 km) over Wallops Island, Virginia, by a Black Brant sounding rocket. After launch, the pebble was to separate from the rocket, and then use its sensors to keep itself oriented with the still firing third stage of the Brant while also recording its orientation through the star tracker. The stage would be above the horizon and would take place at night, easing the problem of tracking. One of the explosive bolts that was supposed to separate the rocket fired 81 seconds into flight, much earlier than planned, causing the fairing to flip over to one side and pull the pebble partially out of the airframe. The only success on the mission was that another experiment, the ultraviolet plume instrument (UVPI) flying in orbit above the launch, was able to successfully track the rocket. As a result of the failure of the first test, the follow-up series was delayed by 10 months.

The second test was carried out on 17 April 1991. In this case the interceptor was supposed to be looking down at the target against the daylight Earth, testing its capability to see targets in this orientation. Because of the failure of the first launch, it was decided to instead repeat the simpler nighttime test that was supposed to have occurred on the first flight. This test intended to have the interceptor separate from the launcher and then perform a programmed turn so it could see the launcher through several following test phases. The first phase was to simply acquire the target via its rocket plume and keep it in sight using the attitude control system. In the next phase, the interceptor would perform a series of more radical maneuvers in order to characterize the performance of the controls and the tracking system in a more realistic scenario. Finally, the system would perform another series of smaller maneuvers intended to be more accurate movements. This test was largely a failure; the system failed to pick up the target, and all of the subsequent movements were found to be much less accurate than required, to a large degree due to the failure of the gyroscopes. Some useful data characterizing the IR background was performed, but the UV sensor only recorded its own background noise.

The final test was carried out on 22 October 1992, using a much more developed prototype built by Livermore that had been miniaturized and was more indicative of a production model. This test would begin like the others, with both the kill vehicle and the target being launched from a single rocket at Wallops Island. Once the two vehicles separated, the kill vehicle was to begin tracking the target, and then use its propulsion system to bring it to within 10 meters (33 ft) of the target vehicle. Seventeen seconds after liftoff the ground crew could see pieces falling off the booster, and it was destroyed by the range safety officer at 55 seconds. The problem was later traced to a failure in one of the rocket nozzles in the Aries I first stage.

== Countermeasures ==
=== Promising cost-exchange ===
Earlier anti-ballistic missile (ABM) systems like Nike Zeus had the problem that they cost more than the ICBMs they were designed to shoot down; the United States would have to purchase $20 worth of interceptors for every $1 the Soviets spent on new ICBMs. In such a situation, the Soviets could defeat any possible ABM deployment simply by building more missiles. This was a major argument against ABM systems in the 1960s and 70s, and became known as the cost-exchange ratio.

This led Paul Nitze to propose what became known as the Nitze criteria; to be successful, the marginal cost of adding to the defense had to be less than the cost of adding to the offense. If this is not true, then the simplest response to any new defense system is simply to build more offensive missiles. But if the defense is cheaper, this will not work, and the enemy will have to explore other solutions to address the imbalance. Ideally, they too would build defenses, ultimately rendering the offence impotent.

Compared to earlier ground-based systems, the Smart Rocks interceptor missiles were relatively simple and low-cost. This meant the US could afford to launch several for every Soviet ICBM. However, they suffered the major flaw that they were dependent on support from the garage, and thus a single anti-satellite weapon could render all of the interceptors inoperative. Smart Rocks thus failed the Nitze criterion, as it was less expensive for the Soviets to attack the system than it would be for the US to build it.

In contrast, the Pebbles interceptors flew independently, and thus to attack them the Soviets would have to launch an ASAT for each one. This would mean that developing countermeasures to the system would be on the same order of cost as the pebbles themselves, something the Soviets' weaker economy could not afford. This appeared to meet the Nitze criterion; they could not afford to build their way out of the problem either using ASATs or new ICBMs.

=== Absentee ratio ===
Critics noted a key flaw in this comparison; since it was only a pebble in the right place at the right time that could attack the ICBM, adding a single ICBM did not require one more pebble, but many more in order to fill out the orbit so one would be in the right area. In the case of Pebbles, this "absentee ratio" was on the order of 10-to-1, meaning that adding a single ICBM would require ten new pebbles, driving the cost much closer to parity.

As the Union of Concerned Scientists pointed out early in the SDI program, any system that relied on boost-phase attacks had to be able to reach the target while the missile's motor was still firing. With existing Soviet ICBMs like the SS-18, this period lasted as long as six minutes. The US's Minuteman missile fleet only burned for four minutes, and the new MX missile was even less. The report went on to explore the ultimate end of such a "fast burn" approach, concluding that it was possible to build a missile that would launch and disperse its warheads in as little as one minute. Such a missile would require many dozens of pebbles for each one so that at least one of them was close enough to catch it, making the defenses much more expensive than the ICBM.

The SDIO argued that such a response by the Soviets would be welcome; while the Soviets were deploying their fleet of new missiles to counter Pebbles, SDI would be on its way to deploying new systems based on directed energy weapons that could defeat those missiles. Critics noted that this meant the SDIO was arguing that Pebbles would lead to an offensive arms buildup, precisely the opposite of what they had previously claimed was the point of the entire SDI concept, and contrary to the Nitze criterion.

=== Other problems ===
Another issue raised was that the existing Soviet A-135 anti-ballistic missile system could be fired at the Pebbles. By timing such an attack moments before an ICBM launch, the A-135 system's 100 missiles could destroy those pebbles approaching the USSR and temporarily "punch a hole" for their ICBMs to fly through. Because of the absentee ratio, 1,000 additional pebbles would have to be added to the fleet to counter this possibility, not 100. This sort of attack would cost the Soviets very little.

Finally, there was another overarching technical issue that affected all of the space-based weapons. Since the late 1970s, the Soviets had used ground-based lasers to "paint" United States satellites on a number of occasions, in some cases temporarily blinding them. The APS report noted that the amount of energy needed to do this was very low, far less than the amount of energy needed to destroy a missile. This meant that while it was still unknown whether one could ever build a useful directed-energy anti-ICBM weapon, it was already possible to build an anti-SDI weapon that would blind such a system's sensors. One commentator went so far as to note that protecting the optics was "impossible". Such a system could be used against the pebbles in a fashion similar to the A-135, rendering them useless for a critical period while ICBMs were launched.

== See also ==
- Multiple Kill Vehicle
