= Szymon Suckewer =

Szymon Suckewer (born April 10, 1938, in Warsaw) is a Polish-born American physicist, and professor emeritus at Princeton University. His primary fields of interest include X-ray lasers, and X-ray microscopy, particularly the generation of ultrashort laser pulses which are applied in plasma diagnostics.

Suckewer completed his degree in physics at the Lomonosov Moscow State University in 1962. He went on to receive a doctorate in physics from the Institute for Nuclear Research at the University of Warsaw in 1966. Suckewer received his habilitation in 1971 after which he was a lecturer at the Institute for Nuclear Research in Warsaw until 1975. In the same year, he went to Princeton University where he was the Senior Research Physicist in the Laboratory for Plasma Physics. From 1987 he worked as a professor and leader of a research team tasked to discover lasers with wavelengths of under 30 nm.

In 1984 Suckewer's team succeeded in creating a laser with a wavelength of 18.2 nm in plasma composed of carbon ions. This was the first successful demonstration of laser operation in the soft X-ray range, almost at the same time as Peter Hagelstein's group at Lawrence Livermore National Laboratory succeeded in doing so too. For the next years, he tasked himself with the need for developing laser pulses of shorter wavelengths and inventing new techniques for producing high-intensity laser pulses.

In 1987 he managed to create ultrashort laser pulses within intensities of $2 \times 10^{18}$ $W \times cm^{-2}$ with a krypton-fluoride laser. With these pulses he managed to induce laser activity in lithium-ion plasma with wavelengths of 13.5 nm. He continued working with laser pulses of even shorter wavelengths into the 21st century. This led Suckewer to investigate applications of his lasers in fields such as bioengineering. He applied his laser technologies in the carrying out of incision-free eye surgery as well as using high-intensity lasers in the safe and efficient removal of tattoos.

In 1990 he received the American Physical Society's Award for Excellence in Plasma Physics Research. In 2005 Suckewer was presented the Willis E. Lamb Award for Laser Science and Quantum Optics. In 2007 he received the Arthur L. Schawlow Award for pioneering contributions to the generation of ultra-short wavelength and femtosecond lasers and X-ray laser microscopy.

Suckewer is a fellow of the American Physical Society and the Optical Society of America and holds numerous patents in The United States Patent and Trademark Office. He transferred to professor emeritus status on July 1, 2016.
