= X-ray laser =

Type of laser

An X-ray laser can be created by several methods either in hot, dense plasmas or as a free-electron laser in an accelerator. This article describes the x-ray lasers in plasmas, only.

The plasma x-ray lasers rely on stimulated emission to generate or amplify coherent, directional, high-brightness electromagnetic radiation in the near X-ray or extreme ultraviolet region of the spectrum, that is, usually from ~3 nanometers to several tens of nanometers (nm) wavelength.

Because of high gain in the lasing medium and short upper-state lifetimes (1–100 ps), X-ray lasers usually operate without mirrors; the beam of X-rays is generated by a single pass through the gain medium. The emitted radiation, based on amplified spontaneous emission, has relatively low spatial coherence. The line is mostly Doppler broadened, which depends on the ions' temperature.

As the common visible-light laser transitions between electronic or vibrational states correspond to energies up to only about 10 eV, different active media are needed for X-ray lasers.

Between 1978 and 1988 in Project Excalibur the U.S. military attempted to develop a nuclear explosion-pumped X-ray laser for ballistic missile defense as part of the "Star Wars" Strategic Defense Initiative (SDI).

== Active media ==
The most often used media include highly ionized plasmas, created in a capillary discharge or when a linearly focused optical pulse hits a solid target. In accordance with the Saha ionization equation, the most stable electron configurations are neon-like with 10 electrons remaining and nickel-like with 28 electrons remaining. The electron transitions in highly ionized plasmas usually correspond to energies on the order of hundreds of electron volts (eV).

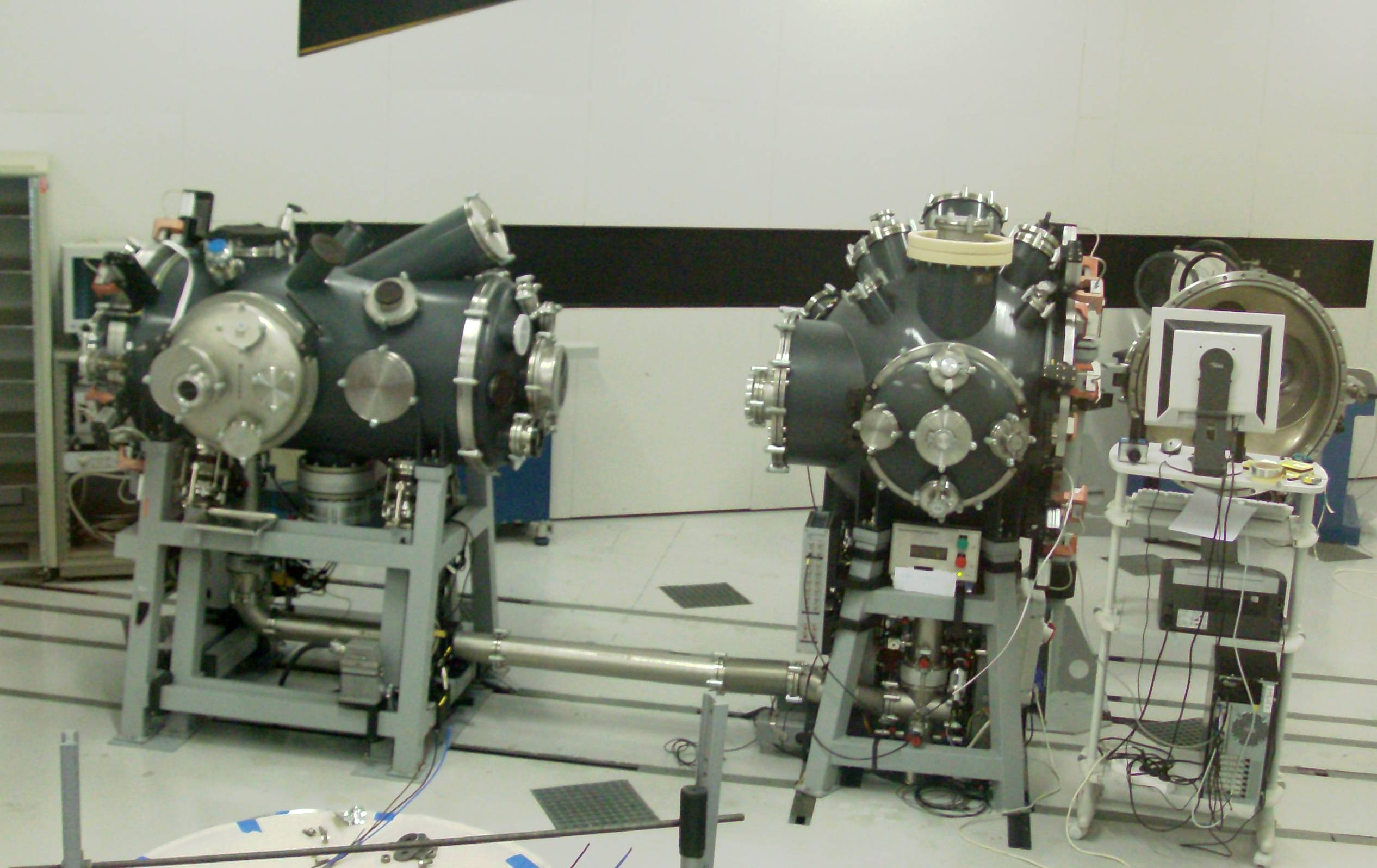
The vacuum chambers at the PALS laboratory in Prague, where a 1 kJ pulse creates plasma for X-ray generation

Common methods for creating plasma X-ray lasers include:

- Capillary plasma-discharge media: In this setup, a several centimeters long capillary made of resistant material (e.g., alumina) confines a high-current, submicrosecond electrical pulse in a low-pressure gas. The Lorentz force causes further compression of the plasma discharge (see pinch). In addition, a pre-ionization electric or optical pulse is often used. An example is the capillary neon-like Ar^{8+} laser, generating radiation at 47 nm, which was first demonstrated in 1994.
- Solid-slab target media: After being hit by an ultra-intense optical (laser) pulse, the metal target evaporates and emits highly excited plasma. Again, a pair of pulses is usually used in the so-called "transient pumping" scheme: (1) a longer pulse on the order of nanoseconds (sometimes preceded by one or several smaller "pre-pulses") is often used for plasma creation and (2) a second, shorter (on the order of hundreds of femtoseconds or a picosecond) and more energetic pulse is used for further excitation in the plasma volume. For short lifetimes a so-called "travelling wave" has been developed, where the plasma is heated just before the passage of the x-ray photons (so-called "guillotine principle" geometry). In order to increase the efficiency of energy transfer from the heating laser pulse into the active medium (plasma), a sheared excitation pulse is sometimes employed, so-called GRIP - grazing incidence pump geometry. The gradient in the refractive index of the plasma causes the amplified pulse to bend from the target surface, because at the frequencies above resonance the refractive index decreases with matter density. This can be compensated for by using curved targets or multiple targets in series.
- Plasma excited by optical field: At optical densities high enough to cause effective electron tunnelling, or even to suppress the potential barrier (> 10^{16} W/cm^{2}), it is possible to highly ionize gas without contact with any capillary or target. A collinear setup is usually used, enabling the synchronization of pump and signal pulses.

An alternative amplifying medium is the relativistic electron beam in a free-electron laser, which, strictly speaking, uses stimulated Compton scattering instead of stimulated emission.

Other approaches to optically induced coherent X-ray generation are:

- high-harmonic generation
- stimulated Thomson scattering
- Betatron radiation

== Applications ==
Applications of coherent X-ray radiation include coherent diffraction imaging, research into dense plasmas (not transparent to visible radiation), X-ray microscopy, phase-resolved medical imaging, material surface research, and weaponry.

A soft x-ray laser can perform ablative laser propulsion.

== See also ==
- European x-ray free electron laser
- Industrial CT scanning
- LCLS X-ray Free Electron Laser at SLAC
