= Gronlund =

Gronlund is a surname. Notable people with this name include:

- Laurence Gronlund (1846–1899), Danish-born American lawyer, writer, lecturer, and political activist
- Linda Gronlund, victim of the 9/11 terrorist attacks
- Lisbeth Gronlund (born 1959), American physicist and nuclear disarmament expert

== See also ==
- Grønlund, a Scandinavian surname
- Grönlund, a Finnish surname
- Grønland (disambiguation)
