= Grønlund =

Grønlund is a surname. Notable people with the surname include:

- Frank Grønlund (born 1952), Norwegian footballer
- Svend Grønlund (1893–1977), Danish philatelist

== See also ==
- Gronlund, a surname
- Grönlund, a Finnish surname
- Grønlundfjellet, a village in the municipality of Gjerdrum, Norway
- Grønland (disambiguation)
