= Fred Kennedy =

Fred Kennedy may refer to:

- Fred Kennedy (footballer), English footballer
- Frederick Charles Kennedy, Scottish river-boat fleet owner
- Fred Kennedy (engineer), American Air force officer
- Fred W. Kennedy (born 1950), Jamaican/Canadian educator and writer
- Fearless Fred Kennedy (born 1981) is a Canadian radio personality
