= Derek Tournear =

American defense official

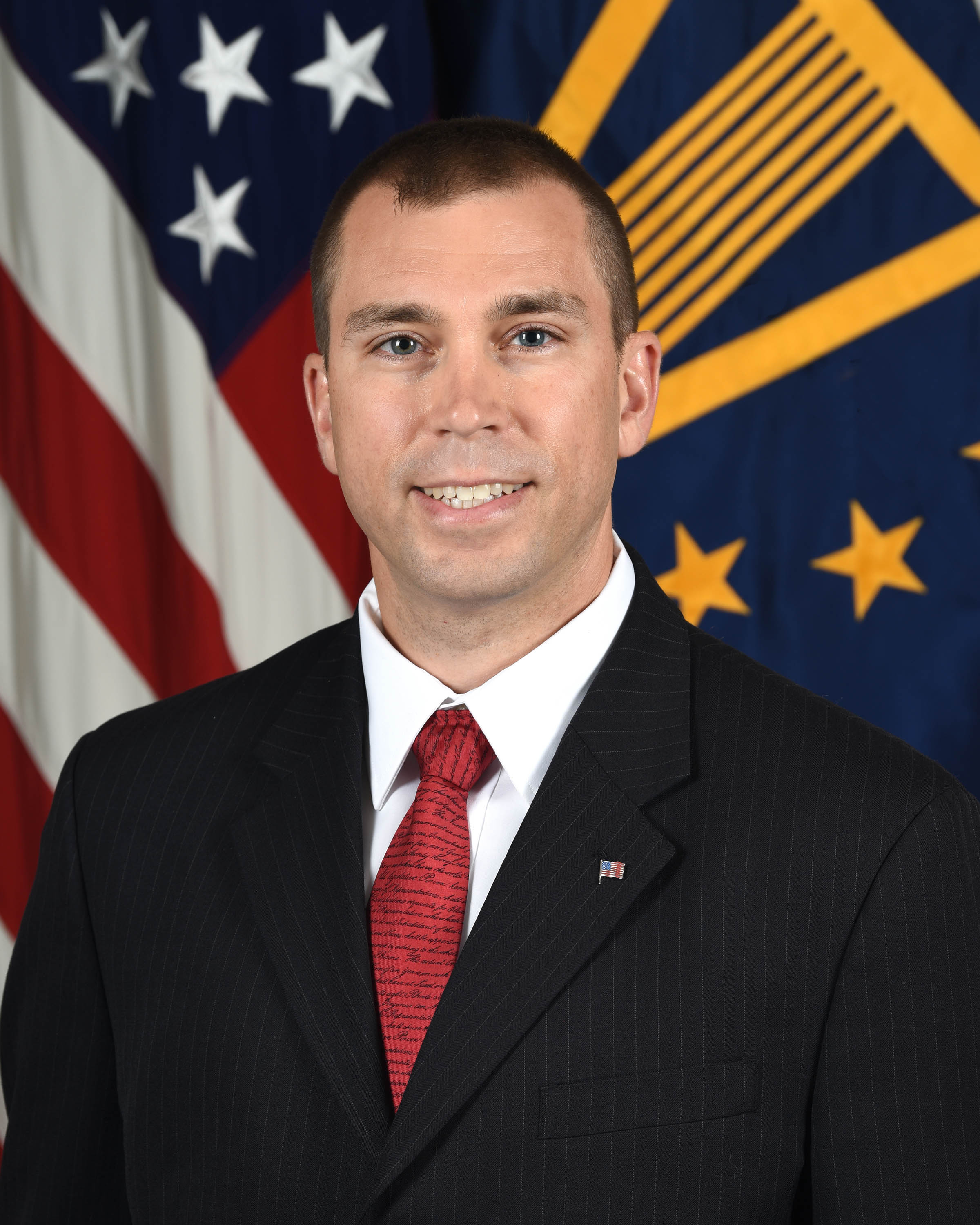
- Official portrait, 2019

Director of the Space Development Agency
- Incumbent
- Assumed office April 17, 2025
- President: Donald Trump
- Preceded by: William B. Blauser (acting)
- In office October 28, 2019 – January 16, 2025; Acting: June 2019 – October 28, 2019
- President: Donald Trump; Joe Biden
- Preceded by: Fred Kennedy (acting)
- Succeeded by: Philip Garrant (acting)

Personal details
- Education: Nuclear Power School; Purdue University (BS); Stanford University (PhD)

Military service
- Allegiance: United States
- Branch/service: United States Navy
- Years of service: 1993–1997
- Rank: Petty officer second class

Derek M. Tournear is an American physicist and former defense official who served as the director of the Space Development Agency from 2019 to 2025. Previously, he served as the Principal Director for Space in the Department of Defense office of Research and Engineering. He has worked at the Harris Corporation, Exelis Inc., Office of the Director of National Intelligence, DARPA, and Los Alamos National Laboratory.

== Education ==
Tournear graduated from the Nuclear Power School in 1995. Tournear then attended and graduated from Purdue University in 1999 with a Bachelor of Science degree in honors physics. He later earned a PhD in physics from Stanford University. His doctoral supervisor was Elliott Bloom, and he completed his dissertation "Non-Quiescent X-ray Emission from Neutron Stars" in August 2003.

== Career ==
=== Los Alamos National Laboratory ===
From September 2003 to April 2007, Tournear was a staff member at the Los Alamos National Laboratory in Los Alamos, New Mexico, where he worked as a staff scientist and program manager. He worked with Richard I. Epstein to create a new gamma ray optic utilizing gamma ray channeling. He also worked with a team that built the world's most precise gamma ray microcalorimeter. Tournear was teamed with Ball Aerospace as the principal investigator for a DARPA Pulsar-based navigation program led by Darryll Pines.

=== Defense Advanced Research Projects Agency ===
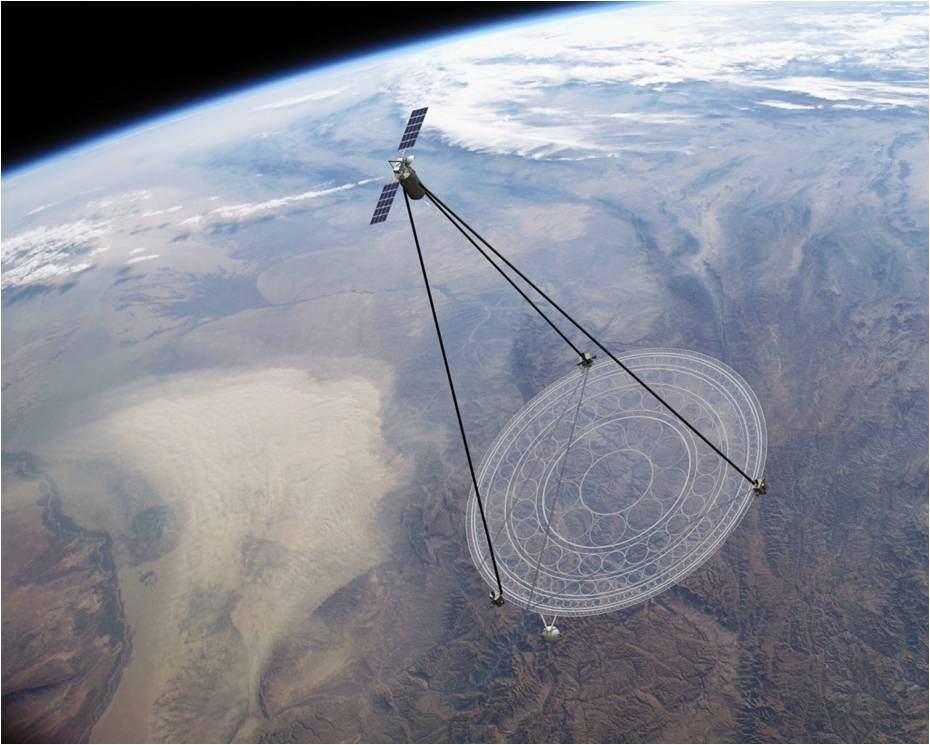
Artist's rendering of the MOIRE project

From April 2007 to March 2011, Tournear was a Program Manager at DARPA in Arlington, Virginia. Tournear managed one of the largest portfolios at DARPA. Tournear primarily initiated and managed programs involving space technology such as the MOIRE program, which employed an Optical membrane concept for performing video imagery from space. Tournear also ran other programs outside of space technology, such as the "Sandblaster" program, originally started by Reggie Brothers, using Enhanced flight vision system and Extremely high frequency radar for landing helicopters in degraded visual environments.

=== Intelligence Advanced Research Projects Activity ===
From March 2011 to May 2012, Tournear was a Senior Program Manager at IARPA in Washington, DC. Tournear initiated the first IARPA space technology program.

=== Harris Corporation ===
From May 2012 to June 2014, Tournear was the deputy VP/GM for the Exelis Inc. ISR and Weather business in Fort Wayne, Indiana.

From June 2014 to June 2015, Tournear was the Director of Innovation for Exelis Inc. geospatial Business Unit in Herndon, Virginia.

In June 2015, Exelis Inc. was acquired by Harris Corporation, and Tournear became the Technical Director for the Innovation Office in the Harris Corporation Space and Intelligence Division.

From March 2016 to May 2019, Tournear served as the director of research and development for the Harris Corporation Space and Intelligence Division. Tournear supported the development and operation of Harris Corporation, entering into the small sat and prime contract business with the launch of a completely internally funded demonstration satellite named "HSAT". This spawned a completely new business area for Harris Corporation. In this role, Tournear co-invented a small satellite tracking device to assist in rapid acquisition and early operations of small satellites.

=== Office of the Secretary of Defense ===
From May 2019 to August 2020, Tournear served as the Principal Director for space in the office of the Under Secretary of Defense for Research and Engineering in the Pentagon. Tournear served as the Chief Technology Officer for the Department of Defense for space and space-related technologies.

=== Space Development Agency ===
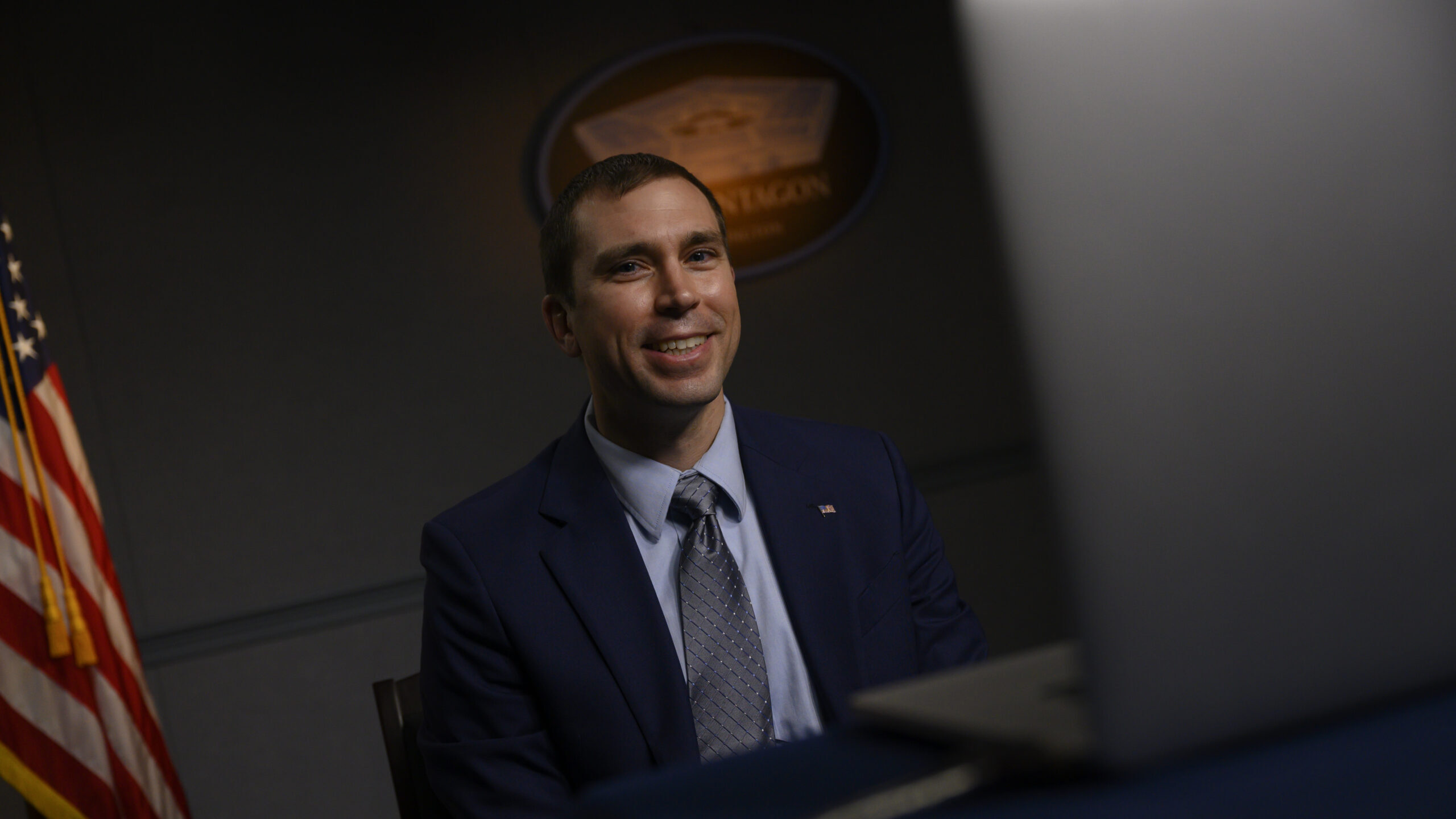
SDA Director Tournear in Pentagon

Tournear was appointed by Michael D. Griffin as the director of the Space Development Agency in June 2019. During his tenure, Tournear led the agency to grow from approximately 12 employees in 2019 to approximately 450 in 2025. The Space Development Agency budget grew from $21M to over $4.5B during this time. Tournear and the Space Development Agency received multiple awards during this time for its approach to alternative contracting models, cutting bureaucracy, rapid fielding, and embracing commercial models. For his role in leading the agency, Tournear received the Stuart Symington Award in 2024, the Theodore Roosevelt Government Leadership Award in 2021, and the Wash100 award in 2021. Tournear earned a reputation at Space Development Agency as a leader who pushed the limits, making a lot of waves, and angering bureaucrats with a relentless pursuit of speed and warfighter focus. On September 8, 2025, Tournear announced his departure from the Space Development Agency in an interview with Breaking Defense, explaining that he would soon become Auburn University's inaugural director for space innovation.

=== Temporary Suspension ===
Tournear was temporarily removed from his position as the SDA Director on January 16, 2025, and placed on administrative leave pending the results of an investigation. The leave stemmed from alleged improper communications during an acquisition. Tournear had been no stranger to controversy as he sought to be a disruptive agent in the arena of defense satellite procurement. Many have publicly speculated that Tournear was placed on investigative leave due to a "witch hunt" initiated to slow down the SDA during ongoing Pentagon power struggles common during administration changes.

Three months after being placed on investigative leave, the Air Force completed their internal investigation and on April 17, 2025 Tournear was reinstated as the Director of SDA.
