= Golden Dome (missile defense system) =

Planned American defense system

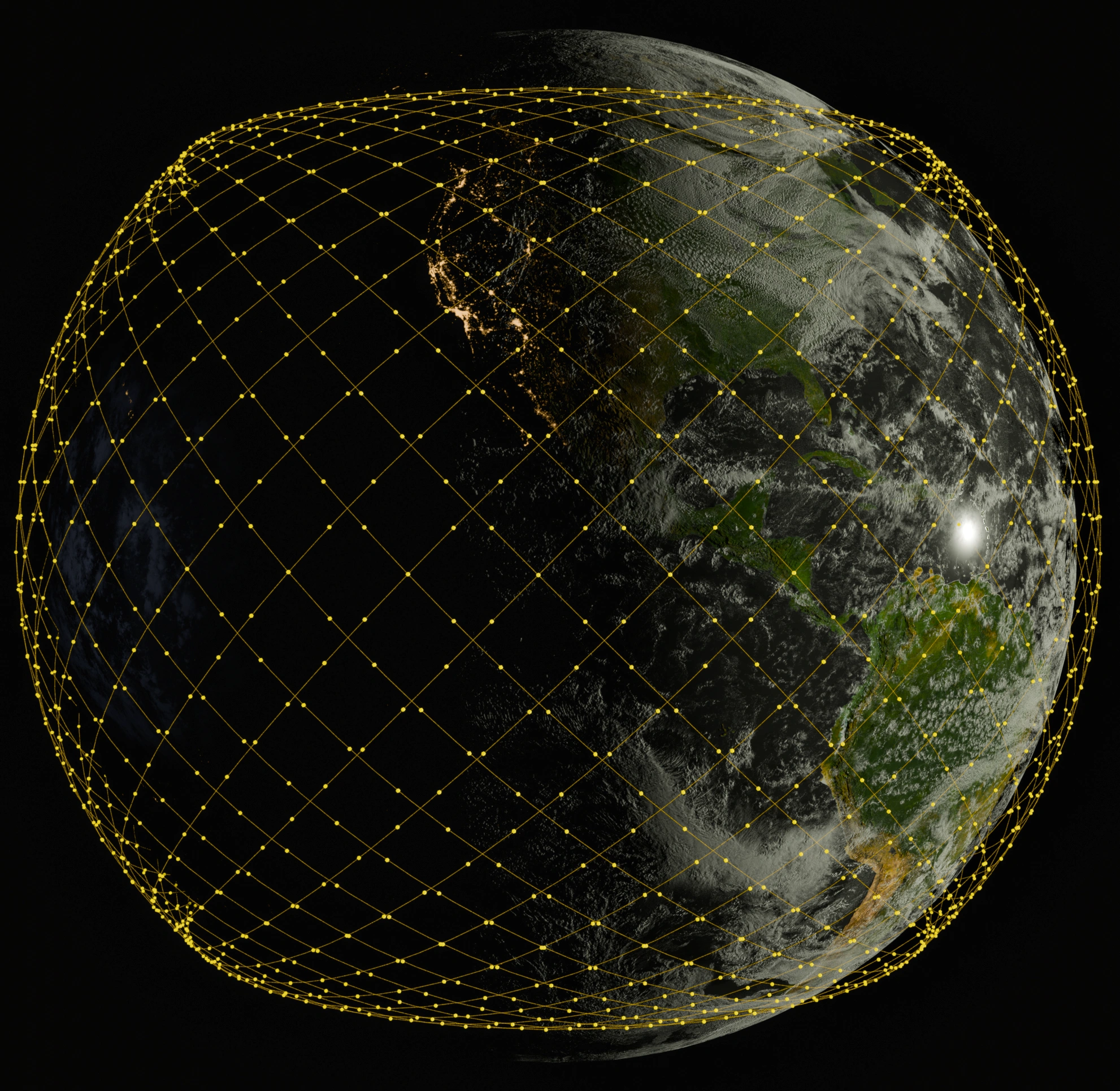
- Visualization of a global constellation of space-based interceptors such as that proposed by Golden Dome
- Type: Missile defense
- Place of origin: United States

Production history
- Unit cost: $1.2 trillion (CBO estimate) $175 billion (White House estimate)
- Produced: 2029– (White House estimate); 2035– (CSIS estimate)

Specifications
- Operational range: Global
- Accuracy: Precision GPS
- Launch platform: Satellites, ground-based

The Golden Dome is a planned multi-layer missile defense system for the United States, intended to detect and destroy ballistic, hypersonic, and cruise missiles before they launch or during their flight.

On January 27, 2025, President Donald Trump signed an executive order directing the secretary of defense to submit a plan for the Iron Dome for America system, which was later renamed Golden Dome. It extends former programs such as Prompt Global Strike, the Proliferated Warfighter Space Architecture, and the Strategic Defense Initiative (the "Star Wars" program). The initial name alluded to Israel's short-range Iron Dome system, but the Golden Dome would encompass the entire Earth, more like the Strategic Defense Initiative proposed by President Ronald Reagan in 1983.

The system would employ a constellation of thousands of satellites equipped with sensors and interceptors that would be the first U.S. space weapons in orbit. Data centers in space would provide automated command and control through a cross-domain artificial intelligence-enabled network. Interceptors would fly in rapid orbit just outside the atmosphere, with only a small fraction available at the right time and place to act on any given threat—a flaw that critics argue makes the concept less efficient than traditional regional missile defenses such as the Iron Dome. In 2019, Donald Trump said the satellites would also carry offensive weapons.

Cost estimates for the Golden Dome program range from $175 billion (White House), to $1.2 trillion (Congressional Budget Office), to $3.6 trillion (American Enterprise Institute) depending on the architectural details. The wide range largely hinges on the number of space-based missiles and the cost of replacing satellites whose low orbits decay quickly due to atmospheric drag. Some $24.4 billion in federal funding was directed to the Golden Dome in the One Big Beautiful Bill Act in 2025, with another $13 billion allocated for the fiscal year 2026, totaling 2.2% of the federal discretionary budget during that year.

== History ==
=== Background ===
Influenced by strategic analyses such as the 1976 Team B report—which argued U.S. intelligence had vastly underestimated Soviet threats—and ideas of the Citizens' Advisory Council on National Space Policy, President Ronald Reagan announced the Strategic Defense Initiative (SDI) in 1983. It proposed a space-based global missile defense constellation intended to render nuclear weapons "impotent and obsolete." The program immediately faced challenges, with concerns by Congress, including prominent senators Sam Nunn and Joe Biden, over its apparent violation of the Anti-Ballistic Missile Treaty, questionable technical feasibility, spiraling launch costs, poor cost-exchange ratio, and destabilizing impact on arms control. By the 1990s, SDI was formally restructured into the Ballistic Missile Defense Organization, pivoting from space-based platforms to more proven ground- and sea-based systems.

U.S. missile defense policy continued to evolve, with the 1999 National Missile Defense Act mandating a system to defend against limited ballistic missile attacks. Following a later Team B report's recommendation, President George W. Bush withdrew the U.S. from the ABM Treaty in 2001. The Obama administration's 2010 Review shifted focus from a homeland-centered shield to more flexible and cooperative regional defenses, limiting the space component to sensing and tracking. This was adjusted by the Trump administration's 2019 Review, expanding scope from rogue states such as North Korea, to include advanced hypersonic threats from "competitors" like Russia and China. By contrast, the Biden administration's 2022 Review, while prioritizing Ground-based Midcourse Defense, emphasized that it is "neither intended nor capable of defeating" peer-level threats from Russia or China, noting "the interrelationship between strategic offensive arms and strategic defensive systems."

While terrestrial defenses developed, the vision of a full space-based shield remained a consistent goal for its proponents. The modern groundwork for the Golden Dome was laid in 2017 by the SDI's former Deputy of Technology, and prominent Team B leader, Michael D. Griffin, who formed the Space Development Agency during the first Trump administration. Griffin long advocated for reusable launch vehicles to make the mass launching of weapons into space economically feasible. While the original Strategic Defense Initiative's attempts at this were short-lived, with the DC-X failing after a series of test flights, Griffin later encouraged and promoted funding of commercial reusable launch vehicles, which have since proven successful.

The Heritage Foundation's Project 2025 effort advocated for a Golden Dome-like effort, writing that SpaceX's development of Starlink proves the feasibility of a space-based "overlayer" of thousands of networked satellites and interceptors, broadly similar to the Brilliant Pebbles concept of the 1980s. During his 2024 presidential campaign, Trump repeatedly mentioned the missile shield concept, often to mixed reception.

=== Announcement ===
President Trump announcing the Golden Dome program in the Oval Office with the Secretary of Defense

On May 20, 2025, U.S. president Donald Trump announced plans for a new space-based missile defense system called the "Golden Dome" intended to shield the United States from long-range and hypersonic missiles. The name alludes to Israel's Iron Dome but the system is planned to be orders of magnitude broader in scope. Technical details and deployment plans were not released.

Trump said the project would be completed within three years and cost about $175 billion, a feasibility, timeline, and price estimate that were quickly and widely disputed. The Congressional Budget Office estimated that it could cost between $161 billion and $542 billion over 20 years, while Republican senators involved in the program predicted it would ultimately cost "trillions of dollars."

In April 2025 the Director, Operational Test and Evaluation (DOT&E) determined that the Golden Dome fell under its oversight, as they are required by law to analyze testing plans for defense programs with procurements above $3 billion. Days later, Elon Musk's Department of Government Efficiency (DOGE) investigated the office and slashed its resources. A defense official told CNN that they believed DOGE wanted to prevent DOT&E conducting independent oversight of the Golden Dome.

In May 2025, 42 members of US Congress formally asked the DoD Inspector General to review Elon Musk’s involvement in the Golden Dome. They cited concerns over deviations from standard acquisition processes and a dome subscription model that could "give Musk undue influence over national security." Another key conflict of interest involves four-star general Terrence J. O'Shaughnessy, former head of U.S. homeland missile defense, who now reports directly to Musk at SpaceX. Michael D. Griffin, founder of the Space Development Agency behind the Golden Dome, has also faced scrutiny. After traveling to Russia with a young Musk in 2001 to study ICBMs, Griffin steered $2 billion in NASA contracts to Musk's newfound space company. SpaceX has since secured missile-tracking satellite contracts through Griffin's SDA as part of its Starshield program. Griffin also serves as an advisor to Castelion, a startup founded by former SpaceX executives that seeks to mass-produce hypersonic weapons.

General Michael A. Guetlein of the U.S. Space Force, was nominated to run the program in June 2025, was confirmed by the Senate the following month, and assumed the position on July 21, 2025. Dr. Douglas Matty was named to head the project in January 2026.

Republicans included $25 billion for the Golden Dome in their 2025 reconciliation spending bill. The fiscal 2026 defense appropriations bill, passed by Congress on February 3, 2026, included $13.4 billion for space and missile defense systems for the Golden Dome.

As of December 2025, the U.S. government had not publicly announced any contract awards for the Golden Dome, though the Wall Street Journal has reported that SpaceX is "set to receive" a $2 billion contract to build a 600-satellite constellation for missile targeting. This came after Musk's earlier denials of involvement, saying he was focused on Mars. Much smaller contracts for space-based interceptors were reportedly awarded "in secret" in late November. Awardees include Anduril Industries, Lockheed Martin, Northrop Grumman, and True Anomaly (a firm backed by JD Vance venture capital). In December, more than 1,000 "qualifying offerors" were deemed eligible for future awards.

In March 2026, Guetlein said the official cost estimate had risen $10 billion, from $175 billion to $185 billion, because “We were asked to procure some additional space capabilities".

== Architecture and doctrine ==
The Golden Dome concept reflects a vast increase in U.S. missile-defense goals, from limited protection against "rogue states" to a system intended to defeat larger strikes from peer-level countries. Proponents say it would create new levels of deterrence by rendering adversary nuclear arsenals obsolete.

It also represents a shift away from midcourse defense, which targets missiles outside the atmosphere. The 44 interceptors of the Ground-Based Midcourse Defense (GMD) system cannot reliably distinguish between a warhead and its decoys, which "seriously limits its effectiveness," as a 2025 report by the American Physical Society put it.

The Golden Dome plans to avoid this problem by disabling missiles in their boost phase, while they are still gaining speed, traveling in a predictable direction, and emitting heat visible to U.S. infrared sensors. Since ground-based boost-phase interception is impractical (interceptors cannot be placed near enough to enemy launch points), the Golden Dome plans to put interceptors in low Earth orbit, where they can pass within a few hundred miles of any point on the planet. But since satellites in LEO travel quickly across the face of the Earth, it would take a constellation of thousands of interceptor satellites to guarantee that one or two are within striking distance of an enemy launch. "Defending against a salvo of 10 missiles would require a constellation 10 times that size—that is, tens of thousands of satellites. Defending against a full Russian or Chinese attack would require hundreds of thousands of satellites," according to MIT physicists Lisbeth Gronlund and David Wright.

The cost of launching satellites is expected to decrease when the heavy-lift SpaceX Starship launch vehicle enters service. Still, the extreme expense of creating such a constellation—and replacing satellites as their orbits decay—has led the U.S. military to also pursue space-based midcourse options that would require fewer satellites. But these would be more expensive and no better than ground-based interceptors at telling decoys from warheads.

Space-based interceptors would be guided by the nascent Hypersonic and Ballistic Tracking Space Sensor system, one of the tracking elements of the Space Development Agency's (SDA) seven-layer Proliferated Warfighter Space Architecture (PWSA). The Golden Dome would also be aimed at detecting and countering strikes delivered from a fractional orbital bombardment system (FOBS).

Pentagon leaders have said the system could be used to put offensive weapons in space, giving a global strike capability that would create offensive overmatch. Defense Secretary Pete Hegseth has said the U.S. "will be able to strike anywhere, anytime". Satellites might carry the bunker-busting Common-Hypersonic Glide Body (C-HGB), which can reportedly fly 1,000 miles to strike within 14 inches of its target. The missile was designed to fit the HIMARS ground launcher, so several can be compactly racked in a satellite payload bays.

The executive order called for several design objectives for the dome to include plans for at least eight components:

- Defense against ballistic, hypersonic, advanced cruise missiles, and next-generation aerial attacks
- Deployment of the Hypersonic and Ballistic Tracking Space Sensor layer
- Deployment of proliferated space-based interceptors capable of boost-phase intercept
- Deployment of terminal-phase intercept capabilities to defeat countervalue attacks (Glide Phase Interceptors (GPIs))
- Deployment of the Space Development Agency's Proliferated Warfighter Space Architecture custody layer
- Deployment of capabilities to defeat missile attacks before launch ("left of launch" preemptive strike capabilities)
- Deployment of a secure supply chain for all components
- Deployment of non-kinetic capabilities to augment kinetic attacks

== Assessment ==
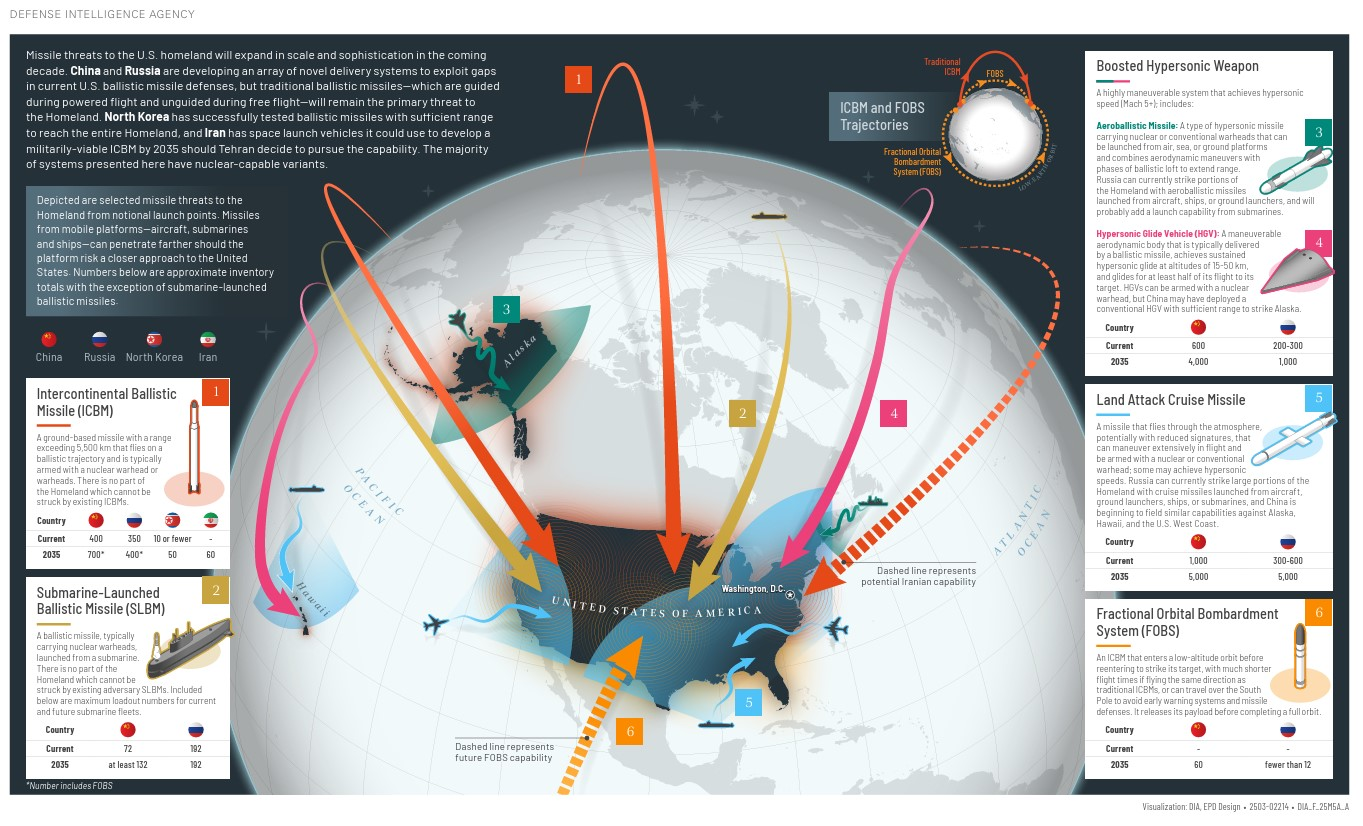
2025 Defense Intelligence Agency assessment of current and future missile threats to the U.S.

Marion Messmer, a senior research fellow at London-based Chatham House, said that the Golden Dome's challenges were much greater than the ones that Israel's Iron Dome had to face as it had a much larger territory to cover and more types of missiles it had to defeat. Shashank Joshi, defense editor at The Economist, said while the US military would take the plan very seriously, it was unrealistic to think the system would be completed during Trump's term, and that its cost would take up a large part of the defense budget. Patrycja Bazylczyk, a missile defense expert at the Center for Strategic and International Studies (CSIS), said that the Golden Dome signaled a reorientation of US missile defense policy towards countering Russia and China, versus existing systems geared towards North Korea. The Arms Control Association has noted that the Putin regime has been working to ensure it can overcome the threat of a future U.S. space-based interceptor network by developing anti-satellite weapons, undersea torpedoes, hypersonic glide vehicles, and nuclear-powered cruise missiles. Beijing, meanwhile, may respond by increasing its nuclear-armed ballistic missile force. Before the announcement, China's military nuclear arsenal stood at about 1/6 the size of that of the United States. Analysts warn that the Golden Dome's pursuit of total immunity could undermine strategic stability, transforming the modern focus on maintaining reliable retaliation into a race to develop new and unpredictable first-strike options.

A study by Todd Harrison of the American Enterprise Institute estimated that the cost of developing and operating the Golden Dome until 2045 could range from $252 billion to $3.6 trillion, depending on how expansive the system is. Advocates of the Golden Dome describe a national missile defense shield as "a strategic imperative." In November 2025, United States Strategic Command nominee Richard Correll testified that the Golden Dome was key to ensure U.S. nuclear second strike capability. Critics suggest the costs for these capabilities have been underestimated, creating a "multi-trillion-dollar gap between rhetoric and reality."

Article I of the Outer Space Treaty states that space is "the province of all mankind" and forbids placing weapons of mass destruction in orbit. Some permanent members of the United Nations Security Council have expressed objections to the Golden Dome program, citing inconsistencies with this principle. The program's use of space for attacking targets on the ground ("left of launch" preemptive strike capabilities) has led to discussion over the legality under international law.

Some analysts argue the integration of such offensive payloads into low Earth orbit (LEO) introduces a severe economic and strategic instability driven by the harsh environmental constraints of the domain. LEO satellites function as "perishable munitions" due to rapid orbital decay, creating a “sunk cost trap” for high-value assets like the C-HGB, which has a procurement cost of approximately $41 million per unit according to the Congressional Budget Office. Unlike terrestrial silos that maintain value for decades, the imminent expiration of orbital weapons creates a fiscal “use it or lose it" pressure, potentially incentivizing commanders to expend these assets in gray zone conflicts rather than allowing billions of dollars of hardware to burn up in the atmosphere. Ultimately, the deployment of such systems creates a state of "orbital ambiguity" that destabilizes traditional deterrence. Because a Starshield satellite carrying defensive interceptors is indistinguishable on radar from a commercial Starlink satellite or one carrying offensive hypersonic gliders, adversaries are forced to treat the entire constellation as a potential nuclear-equivalent first-strike platform. Strategic theorists such as Forrest Morgan (RAND) and James Acton (Carnegie Endowment) argue that this "warhead ambiguity" creates a “reciprocal fear of surprise attack," incentivizing adversaries to execute massive "blinding" strikes against the constellation or its launch infrastructure at the onset of any crisis, thereby ensuring that a limited conflict immediately escalates to the strategic level.

== Strategic value of Greenland ==
On January 14, 2026, Trump stated the United States needed control of Greenland to build the Golden Dome.

In early 2025, the Government Accountability Office warned that the constellation of satellites being built for the Golden Dome, including SDA's PWSA and SpaceX Starshield satellites, have not demonstrated reliable links between satellites in different orbital planes due to high relative motion. Defense analysts note that Pituffik Space Base serves as a critical ground station bridge, being one of the few defensible places on Earth that can directly communicate with all planes in the constellation. While the U.S. already operates from Pituffik with Denmark's consent, some analysts argue sovereignty would eliminate political constraints and ensure uninterrupted control over assets critical to the Golden Dome.

Pituffik is uniquely suited for these laser links because it sits in a polar desert whose exceptionally low precipitable water vapor enables reliable V-band and laser transmissions that are attenuated by moisture in temperate zones. This enables the massive data transfers needed to direct the Golden Dome's hypersonic interceptors. A 2025 USNORTHCOM modernization study consequently prioritized a new network operations center at Pituffik to handle this throughput. Complicating U.S. dominance, the European Space Agency (ESA) began construction of its own optical ground station in Greenland in late 2025, creating a rival infrastructure capable of terabyte-speed data transfer that bypasses U.S. networks. Finally, the site is logistically essential for the Golden Dome's low-orbit interceptors that suffer high atmospheric drag and require continuous replenishment. Some strategic analyses speculate that Arctic basing could, in theory, support higher-latitude launch and tracking operations, though no such launch infrastructure currently exists in Greenland.

Interest in Greenland's rare-earth elements has centered on the Tanbreez deposit. Defense analysts note that the deposit has tantalum and niobium and is uniquely rich in both zirconium and heavy rare earths like samarium and yttrium, the essential precursors for zirconium diboride (ZrB2) ultra-high temperature ceramics. These materials are required to help hypersonic glide weapons survive atmospheric re-entry temperatures. Forbes reported in January 2026 that billionaires including Jeff Bezos, Bill Gates, and Peter Thiel have accelerated investments in Greenlandic ventures such as KoBold Metals and Praxis, effectively betting that security mandates will override local environmental barriers to extraction.

== International reactions ==
- Canada: Canada's ambassador to the United Nations compared U.S. president Donald Trump's Golden Dome to a protection racket after Trump said America's northern neighbor must either pay $61 billion to join the program or could agree to annexation (in which case inclusion would be free). Ambassador Bob Rae also noted that "threats to sovereign integrity are prohibited" under the Charter of the United Nations. Earlier, Canadian minister of national defence Bill Blair had expressed a willingness for participation in the Golden Dome project.
- China: On 21 May 2025, Foreign Ministry spokesperson Mao Ning criticized the Golden Dome plan, claiming it "violates the principle of peaceful use of space in the Outer Space Treaty". She called on the US to "give up developing and deploying [a] global anti-missile system", which risked "turning space into a war zone". In a white paper published by the State Council Information Office in November 2025, China criticized the move towards "absolute security" and that it would "pose a serious threat to outer space security".
- New Zealand: New Zealand defence minister Judith Collins expressed support for the Golden Dome missile system, saying "I don't see it as an attack mechanism. It's a defence mechanism. And if people did not feel they needed to defend themselves, they wouldn't waste the money on it." Trump had earlier noted the space-based system would be "a very big part of our defense and, obviously, of our offense" and capable of striking foreign assets even before they launch. The New Zealand-founded and California-based Rocket Lab had recently acquired the Arizona company Geost, which is involved in the Golden Dome project.
- Russia: Russian Foreign Ministry spokeswoman Maria Zakharova said "the United States' Golden Dome project undermines the foundations of strategic stability as it involves the creation of a global missile defense system." On 8 May 2025, China and Russia made a joint statement criticizing the proposal's rejection of the "inseparable interrelationship between strategic offensive arms and strategic defensive arms", its "left-of-launch" capabilities, and its "orbital deployment of interception systems". On 21 May 2025, Press Secretary Dmitry Peskov instead stated that the plan was a "sovereign matter" for the US, and that the legal framework of defunct US-Russia nuclear arms treaties "must be recreated both in the interests of our two countries and in the interests of security throughout the planet".
- North Korea: On 27 May 2025, North Korea's Ministry of Foreign Affairs criticized the proposal as representing "an outer space nuclear war scenario". It denounced "undisguised moves for space militarization" and argued regional stability requires "the symmetry of the matchless power".

== See also ==
- Joint All-Domain Command and Control – U.S. defense initiative to connect armed forces sensors into a unified network
- Particle-beam weapon

Other nations

- Mission Sudarshan Chakra – Proposed multi-layer defense system for India
- Steel Dome – Turkish national air defence system
