= Harold Spinka =

American physicist (1945–2020)

Harold Matthew Spinka Jr. (April 2, 1945, Chicago – December 27, 2020, Naperville, Illinois) was an American physicist, specializing in experimental particle physics.

== Biography ==
He graduated in 1966 with a bachelor's degree from Northwestern University and in 1970 with a Ph.D. in physics from California Institute of Technology (Caltech). His doctoral dissertation The ^{16}O + ^{16}O reaction was supervised by Thomas Anthony Tombrello (1936–2014). From to 1970 to 1973 Spinka was a postdoctoral fellow at Argonne National Laboratory. In February 1973 he married Katherine Marie Wick (1950–2012). From 1973 to 1976 he was an adjunct assistant professor at UCLA (University of California, Los Angeles). His wife graduated from UCLA in 1976 with a Ph.D. in anatomy.

After resigning from UCLA, he returned to Argonne National Laboratory, where he spent his career as a physicist, senior physicist, and research associate. One of his mentors and close friends was Akihiko Yokosawa (1927–2009). From 1983 to 1986 Spinka was a member of the progressive advisory committee of the Los Alamos Meson Physics Facility (LAMPF), renamed in 1995 the Los Alamos Neutron Science Center (LANSCE). He is known for his research on dibaryon resonances, the spin structure of the proton studied using the Relativistic Heavy Ion Collider (RHIC) at Brookhaven National Laboratory, and the Dark Energy Survey (DES) relating to the identification of supernova candidates. He also did important work involving the Zero Gradient Synchrotron (ZGS) and the Alternating Gradient Synchrotron (AGS).

In 2007 Spinka was elected a fellow of the American Physical Society for "his contributions to spin physics and leadership of symmetry experiments at ZGS, LAMPF, AGS, and RHIC."

He participated in competitive swimming until the age of 73. He enjoyed working with students and often served as a judge at science fairs. Upon his death he was survived by a daughter, a son, and five grandchildren.

== Selected publications ==
- Auer, I.P.; Beretvas, A.; Colton, E.; Hill, D.; Nield, K.; Spinka, H.; Underwood, D.; Watanabe, Y.; Yokosawa, A. (1977). "Measurements of the total cross-section difference and the parameter C_{LL} in pp scattering with longitudinally-polarized beam and target". Physics Letters B. 70 (4): 475–478. Bibcode:1977PhLB...70..475A. doi:10.1016/0370-2693(77)90418-X.
- Hidaka, H.; Beretvas, A.; Nield, K.; Spinka, H.; Underwood, D.; Watanabe, Y.; Yokosawa, A. (1977). "Suggestion for a dibaryon resonance in the pp system". Physics Letters B. 70 (4): 479–481. Bibcode:1977PhLB...70..479H. doi:10.1016/0370-2693(77)90419-1.
- Adams, D.L.; et al. (1991). "Comparison of spin asymmetries and cross sections in π^{0} production by 200 GeV polarized antiprotons and protons". Physics Letters B. 261 (1–2): 201–206. Bibcode:1991PhLB..261..201A. doi:10.1016/0370-2693(91)91351-U.
- Adams, D.L.; et al. (1991). "Analyzing power in inclusive π^{+} and π^{−} production at high x_{F} with a 200 GeV polarized proton beam". Physics Letters B. 264 (3–4): 462–466. doi:10.1016/0370-2693(91)90378-4. (over 650 citations)
- Lehar, F.; et al. (1995). "The movable polarized target as a basic equipment for high energy spin physics experiments at the JINR-Dubna accelerator complex". Nuclear Instruments and Methods in Physics Research Section A: Accelerators, Spectrometers, Detectors and Associated Equipment. 356 (1): 58–61. Bibcode:1995NIMPA.356...58L. doi:10.1016/0168-9002(94)01445-0.
- Bravar, A.; et al. (1996). "Single-Spin Asymmetries in Inclusive Charged Pion Production by Transversely Polarized Antiprotons". Physical Review Letters. 77 (13): 2626–2629. Bibcode:1996PhRvL..77.2626B. doi:10.1103/PhysRevLett.77.2626. PMID 10062005. S2CID 30181587.
- Krueger, K.; et al. (1999). "Large analyzing power in inclusive π^{±} production at high x_{F} with a 22-GeV/c polarized proton beam". Physics Letters B. 459 (1–3): 412–416. Bibcode:1999PhLB..459..412K. doi:10.1016/S0370-2693(99)00677-2.
- Allgower, C.E.; et al. (2003). "The STAR endcap electromagnetic calorimeter". Nuclear Instruments and Methods in Physics Research Section A: Accelerators, Spectrometers, Detectors and Associated Equipment. 499 (2–3): 740–750. Bibcode:2003NIMPA.499..740A. doi:10.1016/S0168-9002(02)01971-X.
- Stephenson, E. J.; Bacher, A. D.; Allgower, C. E.; Gårdestig, A.; Lavelle, C. M.; Miller, G. A.; Nann, H.; Olmsted, J.; Pancella, P. V.; Pickar, M. A.; Rapaport, J.; Rinckel, T.; Smith, A.; Spinka, H. M.; Van Kolck, U. (2003). "Observation of the Charge Symmetry Breaking d + d → ^{4}He + π^{0} Reaction Near Threshold". Physical Review Letters. 91 (14) 142302. arXiv:nucl-ex/0305032. Bibcode:2003PhRvL..91n2302S. doi:10.1103/PhysRevLett.91.142302. PMID 14611518. S2CID 6031296.
- Ave, M.; et al. (2007). "Measurement of the pressure dependence of air fluorescence emission induced by electrons". Astroparticle Physics. 28 (1): 41–57. arXiv:astro-ph/0703132. Bibcode:2007APh....28...41A. doi:10.1016/j.astropartphys.2007.04.006. S2CID 119406043.
- Beddo, M.; et al. (2003). "The STAR Barrel Electromagnetic Calorimeter". Nuclear Instruments and Methods in Physics Research Section A: Accelerators, Spectrometers, Detectors and Associated Equipment. 499 (2–3): 725–739. Bibcode:2003NIMPA.499..725B. doi:10.1016/S0168-9002(02)01970-8. S2CID 56024197. (over 350 citations)
- Allgower, C.E.; et al. (2003). "The STAR endcap electromagnetic calorimeter". Nuclear Instruments and Methods in Physics Research Section A: Accelerators, Spectrometers, Detectors and Associated Equipment. 499 (2–3): 740–750. Bibcode:2003NIMPA.499..740A. doi:10.1016/S0168-9002(02)01971-X.
- Smith, M.; et al. (2016). "DES14X3taz: A Type I Superluminous Supernova Showing a Luminous, Rapidly Cooling Initial Pre-peak Bump". The Astrophysical Journal. 818 (1): L8. arXiv:1512.06043. Bibcode:2016ApJ...818L...8S. doi:10.3847/2041-8205/818/1/L8. S2CID 18716764.
- Stern, Nathaniel P.; Liu, Pufan; Ocola, Leonidas E.; Ellis, Simon C.; Kuhlmann, Stephen; Gupta, Ravi R.; Underwood, David; Spinka, Harold; Kuehn, Kyler (2018). "Photonic ring resonator notch filters for astronomical OH suppression". In Jia, Baohua; Chon, James W. M (eds.). Nanophotonics Australasia 2017. p. 147. doi:10.1117/12.2283353. ISBN 978-1-5106-1393-5. S2CID 126025793.
- Abbott, T. M. C.; et al. (2019). "First Cosmology Results using Type Ia Supernovae from the Dark Energy Survey: Constraints on Cosmological Parameters". The Astrophysical Journal. 872 (2): L30. arXiv:1811.02374. Bibcode:2019ApJ...872L..30A. doi:10.3847/2041-8213/ab04fa. S2CID 84833144.
