= Glide Phase Interceptor =

Developmental American surface-to-air missile

Glide Phase Interceptor (GPI) is a ship-launched, hit-to-kill missile now under development for the United States Missile Defense Agency (MDA) and Japan's Ministry of Defense. It is intended to destroy hypersonic glide vehicles while they are still maneuvering through the upper atmosphere, the so-called glide phase, at ranges and altitudes beyond the Navy's current SM-6 terminal-defense capability. GPI will be fired from the Mk 41 Vertical Launching System aboard Aegis-equipped destroyers and from Aegis Ashore batteries, integrating with the fleet's existing command-and-control architecture.

== Development history ==
The Glide Phase Interceptor traces its roots to the Regional Glide Phase Weapon System (RGPWS) science-and-technology project unveiled by the U.S. Missile Defense Agency (MDA) on 5 December 2019. RGPWS sought industry concepts for a missile capable of engaging hypersonic glide vehicles in the upper atmosphere, and the agency briefed potential bidders during an industry day on 18 December of that year. By early 2021, MDA judged that an operational capability was required sooner than RGPWS could deliver and rescoped the effort into the faster-paced Glide Phase Interceptor (GPI) program, retaining much of the technical groundwork laid under RGPWS.

On 19 November 2021, the agency awarded Other Transaction Authority agreements worth about US$20 million each to Lockheed Martin, Northrop Grumman and Raytheon Missiles & Defense for six-month "accelerated concept design" studies. After completing a system-requirements review, MDA exercised contract options in June 2022 that expanded Northrop's and Raytheon's work into rapid prototyping; Lockheed's design was not continued, leaving two competitors. Further contract modifications in May 2023 raised each agreement ceiling to roughly US$240 million, funding seeker flight tests and risk reduction for divert-propulsion systems.

The program became a bilateral venture when Washington and Tokyo signed a cooperative development agreement on 15 May 2024. Under the arrangement, Japan will provide solid-rocket motors and other propulsion hardware and intends to select a domestic prime contractor by March 2025, backed by an initial budget of ¥73 billion.

Budget pressure and a desire to accelerate schedules led MDA on 25 September 2024 to down-select Northrop Grumman as the sole prime contractor for engineering and manufacturing development; Raytheon's work scope was transferred to Northrop under an expanded agreement.

Section 1663 of the Fiscal Year 2024 National Defense Authorization Act directed the Department of Defense to field 12 GPI test rounds by the end of 2029 and achieve full operational capability, defined as 24 fielded interceptors able to defeat all known regional hypersonic threats, by 31 December 2032. Subsequent budget documents and congressional testimony, however, projected that initial fielding is unlikely before the 2035 timeframe unless additional funding is provided.

== Concept of operations ==
The Glide Phase Interceptor is designed to slot into the existing Aegis Ballistic Missile Defense kill chain, with only software updates to Baseline 9/10 combat-system suites and the C2BMC network. Detection and precision tracking of a hypersonic glide vehicle (HGV) begin with long-range space-based sensors, initially SBIRS / OPIR satellites and, by the late-2020s, the dedicated Hypersonic and Ballistic Tracking Space Sensor (HBTSS) layer, which hand off fire-control quality tracks to the AN/SPY-1D(V) or SPY-6 radar.

Once the track is correlated, the Aegis Weapons System generates an intercept solution and fires GPI from a standard Mk 41 Vertical Launching System canister. A multi-stage solid booster rapidly accelerates the missile to a high-supersonic/low-hypersonic speed and lofts it toward the predicted engagement window, typically 40–100 km in altitude, high enough to avoid the dense terminal-phase maneuvers that defeat SM-6, yet low enough to strike before the weapon re-enters thicker air.

After booster burnout, a re-ignitable upper-stage motor provides "energy management", hitting the brakes or re-accelerating so the weapon can pace a maneuvering glide vehicle. Mid-course guidance commands are transmitted over a two-way datalink fed by C2BMC and HBTSS so that course corrections reflect the target's updated path. Shortly before intercept, the upper stage ejects a hit-to-kill kinetic kill vehicle equipped with an advanced multimode seeker (long-wave IR, short-wave IR and possibly an active RF channel) and high-thrust divert-attitude control thrusters. The kill vehicle executes a series of end-game maneuvers and destroys the HGV by direct impact at closing speeds above Mach 10.

Because GPI is sized for the ubiquitous Mk 41 canister, the initial deployment concept calls for U.S. Navy DDG-51 Flight IIA/III destroyers and Aegis Ashore batteries in Poland and Japan, followed by integration on Japan Maritime Self-Defense Force Kongō- and Maya-class destroyers once the bilateral co-development phase yields production rounds. The interceptor will work in concert with SM-6 (terminal defense) and the forthcoming SM-3 Block IIA upgrades (mid-course exoatmospheric defense) to create a multilayered naval shield against ballistic and hypersonic threats.

== See also ==
- Advanced Defence — Anti-Hypersonic (AD-AH)
