= Laser Interconnect and Networking Communication System =

Laser communication in space test cubesats

Laser Interconnect and Networking Communications System (LINCS) is a test of laser communication in space using two cubesats launched in June 2021.

== Background ==
It was built by General Atomics for the US DOD's Space Development Agency.

The two cubesats, LINCS A/B, were launched on SpaceX's Transporter-2 rideshare in June 2021, but communications were not established by January 2022. One theory is that helium exposure during the Falcon 9 launch affected MEMS devices in the cubesats.

== See also ==
- Free-space optical communication
