= Hypersonic and Ballistic Tracking Space Sensor =

Satellite-based sensor system

The Hypersonic Ballistic Tracking Space Sensor (HBTSS) is a satellite-based sensor system being developed by the Missile Defense Agency (MDA) to guide the Glide Phase Interceptor (GPI) against enemy hypersonic missiles.

HBTSS emerged after the 2019 Missile Defense Review suggested the development of better space-based targeting systems for national missile defense. It is designed to track missiles from launch to interception. It is to be integrated into the Proliferated Warfighter Space Architecture (PWSA), a broader set of satellite constellations being developed by the Space Development Agency (SDA). PWSA will consist of seven layers: data tracking, transport, custody, battle management, navigation, deterrence, and support. The HBTSS will be a part of the tracking layer, whose goal is to "provide global indications, warning, tracking, and targeting of advanced missile threats, including hypersonic missile systems." SDA-developed Wide Field of View (WFoV) satellites will cue HBTSS, which will use Medium Field of View (MFoV) to provide higher-quality data—"fire control data"—to ground-based interceptors. This setup is needed because normal radars may miss hypersonic glide vehicles such as the Russian Avangard and Chinese Starry Sky-2.

In January 2021, the Missile Defense Agency awarded L3Harris Technologies and Northrop Grumman hundreds of millions of dollars to design, build, and demonstrate prototype satellites for the HBTSS. By December 2021, these prototypes had passed design reviews, enabling manufacturing to start. Officials planned to launch two demonstration sensors into orbit by fiscal year 2023. In February 2024, the Department of Defense Defense announced that two prototype HBTSS satellites had been launched to orbit. In April 2025, L3Harris officials said they were ready to go into full-rate production for HBTSS satellites, but Chief of Space Operations Gen. Chance Saltzman said the PWSA was "nowhere near” finalized.
