= James R. French =

American aerospace engineer

James R. French was a prominent U.S. aerospace engineer who died on October 6, 2023 at the age of 86.

Born in Amarillo, Texas, French attended the Massachusetts Institute of Technology B.S. in Mechanical Engineering in 1958.

After graduation, he worked with at the Rocketdyne Division of North American Aviation, then from 1963 to 1967 at TRW.

During his career he helped design, develop, and test the H-1, F-1, and J-2 engines for the Apollo/Saturn launch vehicles, and the Apollo Lunar Module descent engine. He then joined NASA's Jet Propulsion Laboratory (JPL) where he worked on the Mariner, Viking, and Voyager missions. He left JPL to beccome vice president–engineering of the American Rocket Company, one of the earliest entrepreneurial space launch vehicle start-ups.

French was a long-time advocate of a mission architecture for a Mars probe, known as Mars Sample Return with In-Situ Propellant Production, that would manufacture propellant from resources at the target planet to power a return trip, to dramatically reduce the size of the outbound vessel and the cost of the mission. He also published an article in the Journal of the British Interplanetary Society in 1989, recommending in-situ propellant production for a crewed Mars mission, though he recommended that the technique would not be feasible until a Mars base was already well-established, due to the risks of relying on fueling a spacecraft with in-situ produced propellant. Robert Zubrin credits this paper as a forerunner of the Mars Direct mission architecture, in which French's concern is resolved by devoting a separate spacecraft to the return trip, so that it can be verified as fueled and ready to launch from Mars before the crew launches from Earth.

French later worked as a private space systems engineering consultant, and was part of the start-up of and a consultant for Blue Origin. He was a fellow of the American Institute of Aeronautics and Astronautics (AIAA).

French was the author of the memoir Firing a Rocket: Stories of the Development off the Rocket Engines for the Saturn Launch Vehicle and the Lunar Module as Viewed From the Trenches which primarily focused on his time working on Apollo.(ISBN 1549688685)

He also co-authored the book Space Vehicle Design (ISBN 1-56347-539-1) with Michael Griffin, who was the chief of NASA until January 20, 2009.
