= Courtney Stadd =

American government official (born 1954)

Courtney Stadd (born October 1954) was President George W. Bush's transition team's director regarding the National Aeronautics and Space Administration (NASA) during 2000 and 2001. He left NASA in 2003 to return to Capitol Solutions, a management consulting firm with aerospace clients seeking government contracts.

In 2009 Stadd was convicted for both using his government job at NASA to serve his own financial interests and also for making false statements to investigators, and served three years in prison during the aftermath.

== Professional background ==
Stadd spent more than thirty-five years in the public and private aerospace sectors where he primarily helped draft and implement federal policies and regulations to create new commercial space industries – including launch services, satellite imagery, Global Positioning Satellites, spaceports. In the latter sector, he worked with various ventures in these various industries. Between 1977 and 1980, he was General Manager of the National Space Institute (renamed National Space Society), co-founded by Wernher von Braun, and focused on educating the American public on space exploration.

In 1979, he was managing editor, Space Humanization Review, a scholarly journal devoted to the interdisciplinary study of human settlements of outer space.

During the early 1980s, he worked with several nascent commercial space ventures, including StarStruck, Inc. (renamed American Rocket Company). He obtained one of the first federal government approvals for a commercial rocket. Stadd also helped organize a coalition to support the 1984 Commercial Space Launch Act that established the U.S. Department of Transportation as the lead licensing agency for the commercial launch industry.

In the mid-1980s, he was appointed as special assistant for Space Commercialization, within the Office of the U.S. Secretary of Commerce. Stadd was helped promote the emergence of a U.S. commercial rocket industry. This culminated in the 1986 Presidential Space Policy Directive that directed that NASA's Space Shuttle no longer launch satellite missions that do not require human intervention.

Stadd was then appointed as director of the Office of Commercial Space Transportation within the Office of the Secretary of the U.S. Department of Transportation (DoT). In that capacity, he issued the first set of regulations implementing the 1984 Commercial Space Launch Act, as well as issuing the first license for an American commercial rocket.

From 1989-1992, he was senior director, White House National Space Council, where he led inter-agency teams focused on drafting presidential directives aimed at promoting space commercialization.

Stadd received the NASA Distinguished Service Medal in 2001 for "his extraordinary vision, leadership, and dedication".

After his stint at DoT, he formed a management consulting firm, Maryland-based Capitol Solutions, where he worked with a diverse array of small and large aerospace-related organizations. He went on to head the first term NASA transition team for George W. Bush. He was then named Chief of Staff and White House liaison and remained in that capacity through the Columbia accident (February 2003) and was involved in establishing a fund to support survivors of NASA officials who are killed in the line of duty. At the invitation of Administrator Michael D. Griffin, he went back to NASA HQ in a temporary advisory capacity (April–June 2005) where he helped to design a new career technical position, Associate Administrator, a new senior-level position in the Office of the Administrator.

After leaving his advisory role, Stadd went on to become assistant executive producer for the PBS Television program, Space Shuttle Columbia: Mission of Hope, which was produced under the auspices of Tom Hanks’ Playtone and Herzog Productions. It was shown on PBS in February 2013.

== Criminal felony convictions ==
In 2009, Stadd was convicted for both using his government job at NASA to serve his own financial interests and also for making false statements to investigators. The convictions involved directing funds to Mississippi State University, which was in turn a client of Stadd's consulting firm. Among other crimes, he signed an agreement while at NASA not to try and enrich personal clients but then he billed M.S.U. for his lobbying services on their behalf while he was at NASA. Despite his subsequent denials, a jury found him guilty during the first trial and he was sentenced to six months House Arrest. Appeals efforts failed afterwards. In a second trial, Stadd pleaded guilty for a second contract between NASA and MSU, in which he asked for a kickback to his usual fees. He was found guilty of conspiracy and was sentenced to 41 months in prison beginning in early 2011. Stadd was released on January 22, 2014.
