= Baohua Jia =

Chinese-Australian nanotechnologist and photonics researcher

Baohua Jia is a Chinese-Australian nanotechnologist and photonics researcher specializing in the absorption and emission of light by nanomaterials and the development of nanomaterials for plasmonic solar cells, solar thermal collectors, and radiative cooling. Her research has also concerned ultra-thin graphene-based flat lenses, graphene oxide supercapacitor batteries, laser nanoprinters, and "atomaterials", a word coined by Jia for the atomic-level building blocks of nanomaterials. She is a professor and ARC Future Fellow at RMIT University, where she directs the Center for Atomaterials Sciences and Technology.

== Education and career ==
Jia earned bachelor's and master's degrees at Nankai University in China, and completed her PhD at the Swinburne University of Technology. She remained at Swinburne, becoming a full professor there and founding director of the Centre for Translational Atomaterials. She moved to her present position at RMIT in 2022.

== Recognition ==
Jia was a 2013 recipient of the Young Tall Poppy Award of the Australian Institute of Policy and Science. Optica named Jia as a 2021 Optica Fellow, "for outstanding and sustained contributions to the research and development of ultrafast laser fabrication and two-dimensional photonics". In 2023 she was elected to the Australian Academy of Technology and Engineering. She is also a Fellow of the Institute of Materials, Minerals and Mining.
