= Fred Kennedy (engineer) =

American defense official

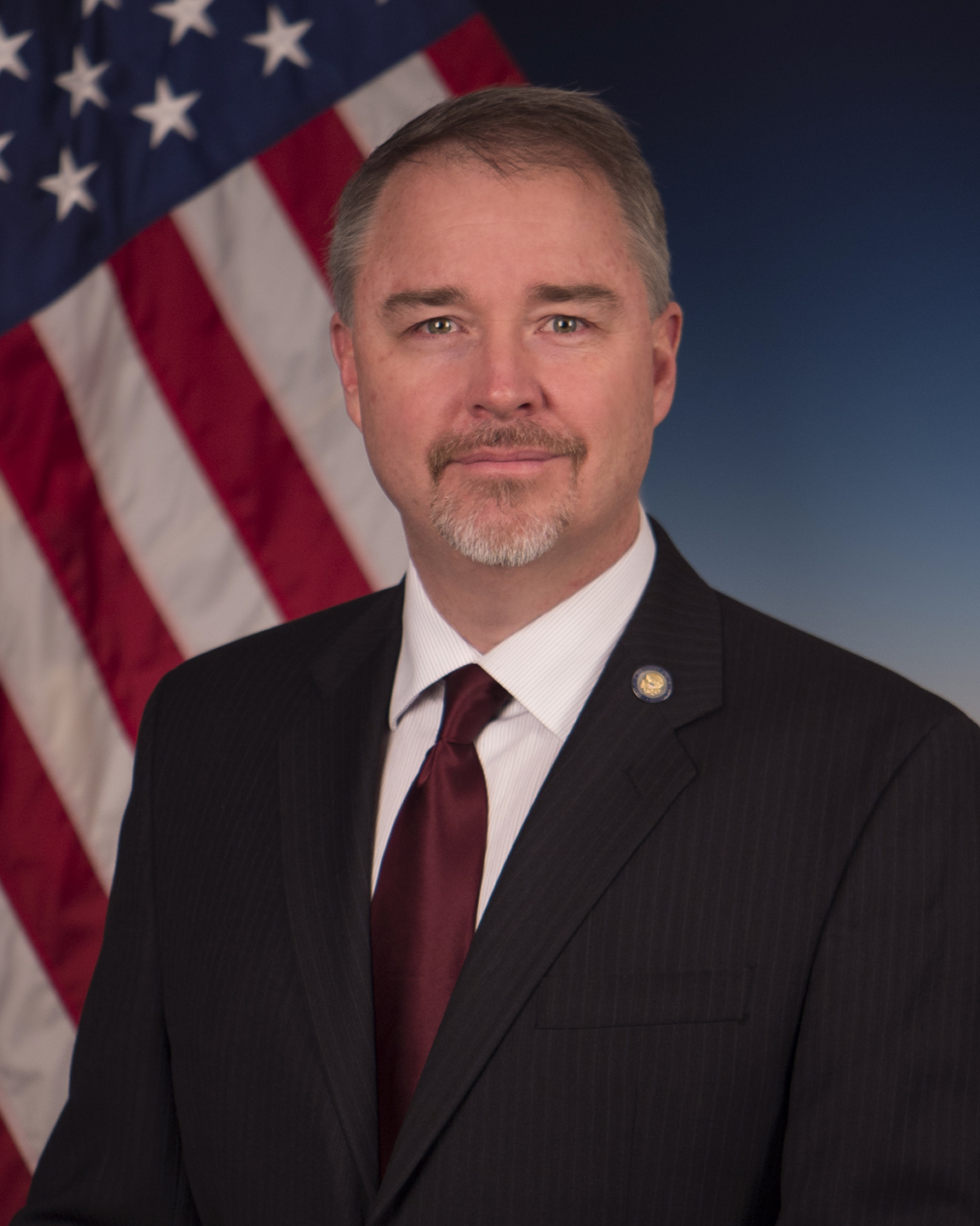
- Official portrait, 2017

Director of the Space Development Agency
- In office March 12, 2019 – June 2019
- Preceded by: Position established
- Succeeded by: Derek Tournear

Personal details
- Education: Massachusetts Institute of Technology (BS, MS); George Washington University (MA); University of Surrey (PhD)

Colonel Fred Kennedy is the former director of the Space Development Agency.

== Education and career ==
Kennedy received a Master of Science and Bachelor of Science, both in aeronautics and astronautics, from the Massachusetts Institute of Technology. He later earned a Master of Arts in organizational management from George Washington University, a Master of Arts in strategic studies from the U.S. Army War College, and a Doctor of Philosophy in electronics and physical sciences from the University of Surrey.

Kennedy served as the Office Director of the Tactical Technology Office at the Defense Advanced Research Projects Agency. Kennedy is a retired United States Air Force colonel.
