= Fred W. Kennedy =

Jamaican/Canadian writer & educator

- Fred W. Kennedy in 2022
- Born: Fred William Kennedy; July 28, 1950 (age 75); Kingston, Jamaica
- Education: B.A., Graduate Diploma in Education, University of West Indies; Master of Education, Doctor of Education, University of Toronto.

Fred W. Kennedy (born July 28, 1950 in Kingston, Jamaica) is a Jamaican/Canadian educator and writer.

== Early life and education ==
Kennedy was born and raised in Kingston, Jamaica, the second youngest of five children born to Luis Fred Kennedy and Lydia Mathilde Kennedy (née Loinaz). He attended St. George's College, and later obtained a Bachelor of Arts and a Graduate Diploma in Education from the University of West Indies, both in Kingston. Kennedy speaks both English and Spanish.

== Teaching career and continuing education ==
Kennedy began his career as a teacher at York Castle High School in Brown's Town, Jamaica in 1973. In 1976, Kennedy emigrated to Toronto, Canada, where he began working as a secondary school teacher in the Toronto District School Board (TDSB). Kennedy obtained a Master of Education degree in 1984 and a Doctoral of Education degree in 1995, both from the University of Toronto. Following several years as a secondary school teacher, Kennedy worked in the TDSB as a secondary school Vice Principal.

From 2004 to 2006, Kennedy returned to Kingston, Jamaica to serve as Headmaster at his alma mater, St. George's College. Although St. Georges was originally founded as a school for boys only, in 2005 Kennedy instituted a co-educational pre-university program for both female and male students. Kennedy retired in 2006.

In 2015, Kennedy was awarded the Monsignor Gladstone Wilson award for his contribution to the advancement of St. George's College and its Old Boy's Association.

== Writing career ==
Kennedy is the author of three books; Daddy Sharpe, Huareo, and Firstborn.

=== Daddy Sharpe ===
Daddy Sharpe – A Narrative of the Life and Adventures Of Samuel Sharpe, A West Indian Slave Written by Himself, 1832 is a fictionalized first-hand account of the life of Samuel Sharpe, an enslaved Jamaican who led the Great Jamaican Slave Rebellion, also known as the Christmas Rebellion, from 1931 to 1932. Daddy Sharpe was published in 2008 by Ian Randle Publishers, Jamaica.

=== Huareo ===
Huareo: Story of a Jamaican Cacique is a fictionalized account of the life of Huareo, a tribal chieftain, or cacique, of the Taino people in pre-colonial Jamaica at the time of the first contact with Spanish colonial settlers between 1494 and 1509. Huareo was published in 2015 by Ian Randle Publishers, Jamaica.

==== Huareo - Spanish Edition ====
In 2016, a Spanish edition of Huareo was released: Huareo: Cacique de Jamaica, also published by Ian Randle Publishers.

=== Firstborn ===
Firstborn – The Life of Luis Fred Kennedy 1908-1982 is a biography of the life of Kennedy’s father, Luis Fred Kennedy, a Jamaican businessman who co-managed and later served as Governing Director of Grace Kennedy & Co. Ltd. Firstborn was published in 2022 by Friesen Press, Canada.

== Awards ==
Kennedy's third book, Firstborn, was awarded the 2023 Gold Book Award from the Nonfiction Authors Association. Firstborn was also recognised as a finalist in the 2023 International book awards in the category Biography:General.

== GraceKennedy Foundation Involvement ==
Kennedy is currently the Chair of the GraceKennedy Foundation, the charitable foundation of the Grace Kennedy & Co. Ltd. corporation. He was appointed Chair of this foundation in 2017.

== Personal life ==
Kennedy and his wife, Georgianne, reside in Jamaica and in Canada. They have three daughters and seven grandchildren.
