= Space Development Agency =

U.S. federal agency

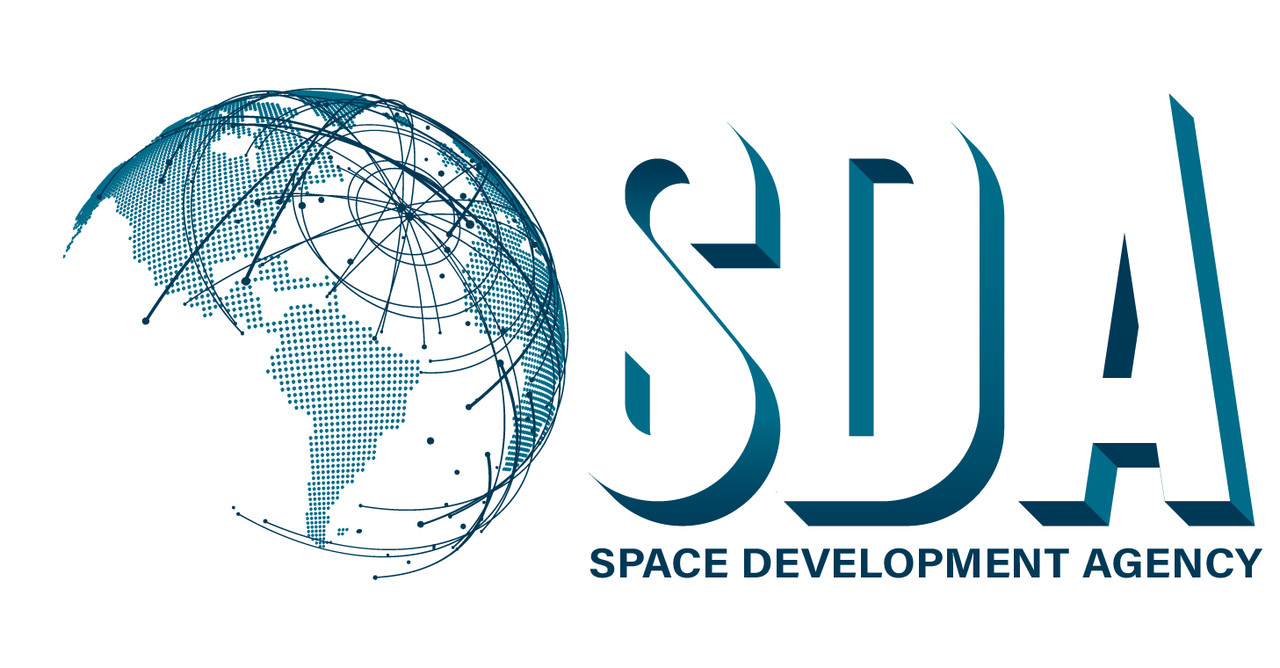
- Space Development Agency

Agency overview
- Formed: March 12, 2019; 7 years ago
- Type: Direct reporting unit
- Headquarters: The Pentagon, Arlington County, Virginia, U.S.; 38.871°N 77.056°W
- Motto: Semper Citius; (Latin: "Always Faster")
- Agency executives: Gurpartap "GP" Sandhoo, Director (Acting); Michael Eppolito, Deputy Director (Acting)
- Parent department: United States Department of the Air Force
- Parent agency: United States Space Force
- Website: www.sda.mil

The Space Development Agency (SDA) is a United States Space Force direct-reporting unit tasked with deploying disruptive space technology. One of the technologies being worked on is space-based missile tracking using large global satellite constellations made up of industry-procured low-cost satellites. The SDA has been managed by the United States Space Force since October 2022. By February 2024 the SDA had 38 satellites on orbit. SDA intends to have at least 1,000 satellites in low Earth orbit by 2026.

The Space Development Agency's network of military satellites is called the Proliferated Warfighter Space Architecture. It is highlighted by White House executive order as a key element of the future Golden Dome (missile defense system).

== History ==
The Space Development Agency (SDA) was established in 2019 by Mike Griffin with his appointment to Under Secretary of Defense (R&E) by President Donald Trump. Griffin was a long time advocate for low Earth orbit constellations to eliminate U.S. vulnerability to ballistic missiles with his work on space-based interceptors for the Strategic Defense Initiative and Brilliant Pebbles in the 1980s. These programs, however, were discontinued in the 1990s due to high cost and political disagreement. Later, the United States and other countries developed hypersonic weapons, which Griffin argued were thermally dimmer and could only be reliably tracked by low-flying satellites with infrared sensors, creating a need to resurrect such programs. In addition to hypersonic weapons, the memorandum establishing the SDA also calls for a new space architecture "not bound by legacy methods or culture" that provides unifying command and control through a cross-domain artificial intelligence-enabled network.

The SDA originally introduced the National Defense Space Architecture, which was later renamed the Proliferated Warfighter Space Architecture. (Note: The name change of the constellation from NDSA to PWSA —'proliferated warfighter space architecture'— will have no impact to the SDA mission.) It advances a network of global orbiters organized into layers, each supporting distinct military functions such as communications, surveillance, navigation, battle management, deterrence, and missile defense. The satellite constellation is to be interconnected by free-space optical laser terminals in a secure command and control optical mesh network. Satellites are to be low cost and "proliferated" in low Earth orbit. New commercial technology such as reusable launch systems have reduced deployment costs and new mass-produced commercial satellites offer less "juicy" targets for anti-satellite weapons by being inexpensive and potentially hard to distinguish from other commercial satellites. Development follows a spiral model, (Note: "The OUSD(R&E) will develop critical technologies, rapidly prototype them, and conduct continuous campaigns of joint experimentation to improve on those technologies and deliver capabilities", —Hon. Heidi Shyu, head of the office of the undersecretary of defense for research and engineering (OUSD(R&E)).) (Note: Tranche 0 will demonstrate the feasibility of: Low latency data connectivity; Beyond line of sight targeting; Missile warning/missile tracking; On-orbit fusion; Multi-phenomenology ground-based sensor fusion) with each generation informed by lessons from earlier deployments, and new satellites launched regularly to replace those with relatively short operational lifespans. The SDA expects to field and maintain a constellation of at least 1,000 satellites on orbit by 2026.

The SDA has mostly avoided flaws that plagued earlier proliferated missile defense programs such as Brilliant Pebbles. The Anti-Ballistic Missile Treaty was a major impediment in the past, as these systems were deemed non-compliant with the treaty by Congress. However, George W. Bush withdrew the United States from the treaty in 2002, eliminating this barrier. Over the years, launch and manufacturing costs have been greatly reduced. Decades after the SDIO's DC-X failed there are now commercial reusable launch vehicles such as SpaceX's Falcon 9 rocket. Meanwhile mass manufacturing as with Starlink has proven the potential for lower satellite build costs.

Political and administrative opposition to SDA came from 24th secretary of the Air Force Heather Wilson who argued that "launching hundreds of cheap satellites into theater as a substitute for the complex architectures where we provide key capabilities to the warfighter will result in failure on America's worst day if relied upon alone." Members of Congress also gave concerns that SDA would drain resources and jobs from Air Force and questioned why DoD had to create a separate organization to circumvent its own procurement process. Despite the pushback, the Pentagon did not require congressional authorization to create the SDA, and Wilson was overruled by Patrick M. Shanahan, who became acting defense secretary by appointment of Donald Trump. He placed the new agency under the authority and control of Mike Griffin who was also appointed as Under Secretary of Defense (R&E).

Despite these early successes, SDA still faces critical challenges. The Union of Concerned Scientists warned SDA could escalate tensions with Russia and China and called the project "fundamentally destabilizing". Both China and Russia brought concerns to the United Nations about the U.S. plans for militarization of space. The Carnegie Endowment for International Peace has advocated for better use of arms control and international agreements such as a treaty halting related development by all parties to prevent an arms race in space.

Critics have reiterated longstanding concerns that ground-based lasers can easily "paint" satellites in low Earth orbit, temporarily blinding their sensors. The APS reporting the energy needed for this is very low. Likewise, RF jamming is simpler when communication and radar satellites are in lower altitudes as less power is needed to saturate their low-noise amplifiers. It is also far easier to launch an anti-satellite weapon to destroy satellites in low Earth orbit (as demonstrated with small ASM-135 or RIM-161 missiles) given much less energy is required to kinetically intersect than to enter and maintain orbit. An adversary would simply need to "punch a hole" in the constellation immediately before launching an attack. When the Biden administration took ownership of the program in 2021, they appeared to take heed of these concerns but still signed on to a $500M increase for the agency in the FY2023 spending bill.

The Heritage Foundation, a conservative think tank, dubbed the Space Development Agency "a model for the military". In their 2025 Mandate for Leadership, they call to develop new offensive space capabilities to "impose [American] will if necessary". They further claim the Biden administration "has eliminated almost all offensive deterrence capabilities" in space that were planned under the Trump administration.

In 2020, 13th Assistant Secretary of the Air Force for Acquisition, Technology and Logistics Will Roper expressed interest in the SpaceX Starlink satellite internet constellation as a platform for the SDA.

SDA awarded its first contracts in August 2020. Lockheed Martin received $188 million and York Space Systems received $94 million to each build 10 data relay satellites for its transport layer. In October 2020, SDA chose SpaceX and L3Harris Technologies to develop four satellites each to detect and track ballistic and hypersonic missiles. The initial tranche of satellites were originally scheduled to launch September 2022. However, the initial launch slipped due to supply-chain issues for microelectronics such as radios, software problems, and protests by Raytheon and Airbus over procurement and evaluation process. SDA industry partners now include SpaceX, L3Harris Technologies, Northrop Grumman, Ball Aerospace and General Dynamics.

A number of experimental satellites were launched in 2021. SDA plans to test some of the key technologies in a series of on-orbit experiments that went up on Transporter-2: Mandrake 2, the Laser Interconnect and Networking Communications System (LINCS), and the Prototype On-orbit Experimental Testbed (POET).

SDA's current schedule expects Tranche 0 capability (Note: Space development agency (SDA) provides the PWSA wide field of view (WFOV) sensors; Missile defense agency (MDA) provides the Hypersonic and Ballistic Tracking Space Sensor (HBTSS) sensors, (i.e., the Medium Field of View (MFOV) sensors). The WFOV sensors provide cueing data to the MFOV sensors, which are more sensitive and provide tipping data to the earth-based interceptors. as cited in USNI News. Two WFOV satellites were launched as part of the inititial Tranche 0.) will be on orbit in time to support a summer 2023 demonstration. Link 16 connectivity between Five Eyes nations, via Low Earth Orbit Tranche 0 satellites was demonstrated from 21 November to 27 November 2023. Global coverage of missile launches will take 40 downward-looking satellites. By year-end 2025 there will be 126 Link-16 satellites in orbit for intercommunication, using Tranche 1 Tracking capabilities. Tranche 2 Tracking capability will start in 2026.

Tranche 1 satellites were solicited for bid in 2021, expecting first launch in September 2024, and monthly launches thereafter. Tranche 1 totals more than 150 satellites: 126 in Tranche 1 Transport Layer; 35 in Tranche 1 Tracking Layer; 12 in the Tranche 1 Demonstration and Experimentation System. In 2022 contracts were awarded to York Space Systems, Lockheed Martin Space, and Northrop Grumman Space Systems.

Tranche 2 satellites were solicited for bid in 2023, for launch in 2026. This consists of more than 550 satellites: 250 in the Transport Layer; 50 in the Tracking Layer; Transport Layer will have 100 Alpha satellites, 72 Beta satellites, and 44 Gamma satellites; The Beta satellites Request for Proposal (RFP) was released in the 2nd week of April. The Alpha RFP was released in June 2023 and Gamma is scheduled for early 2024. The Alpha satellites are similar to those in the Tranche 1 Transport Layer; the Beta satellites will have UHF and tactical communications payloads; the Gamma satellites will carry advanced waveform payloads. York Space Systems will build 62 satellites for the Tranche 2 Transport Layer. In 2023 contracts for 72 satellites were awarded to Northrop Grumman and Lockheed Martin (for 36 Beta satellites apiece). In 2024 a third vendor, Rocket Lab LLC, was selected to supply 18 space vehicles, an additional part of the Beta Tranche 2 Tracking Layer (T2TL) tranche, for a total of 90 space vehicles in the Beta T2TL tranche.

On 16 January 2024, the SDA announced an award to three vendors worth up to $2.5 billion. These vendors will supply "preliminary fire control" satellites in the Tranche 2 Tracking Layer. They will carry infrared (IR) cameras, with a mix of fields of view (FOVs). The FOVs in the IR cameras will be either wide FOV (WFOV), or medium FOV (MFOV) for low-resolution, or higher-resolution tracking capability respectively. If such a satellite were to prove performant, and launched early, and no later than April 2027, a vendor could receive an incentive payment. Each vendor is to provide 18 satellites, of which 16 are to carry WFOV cameras; the remaining two are to be MFOV cameras. The Proliferated Warfighter Space Architecture (PWSA) will rely on these preliminary fire control satellites to perform the JADC2 concept. Tranche 2 Tracking capability will start after the 2026 launches.

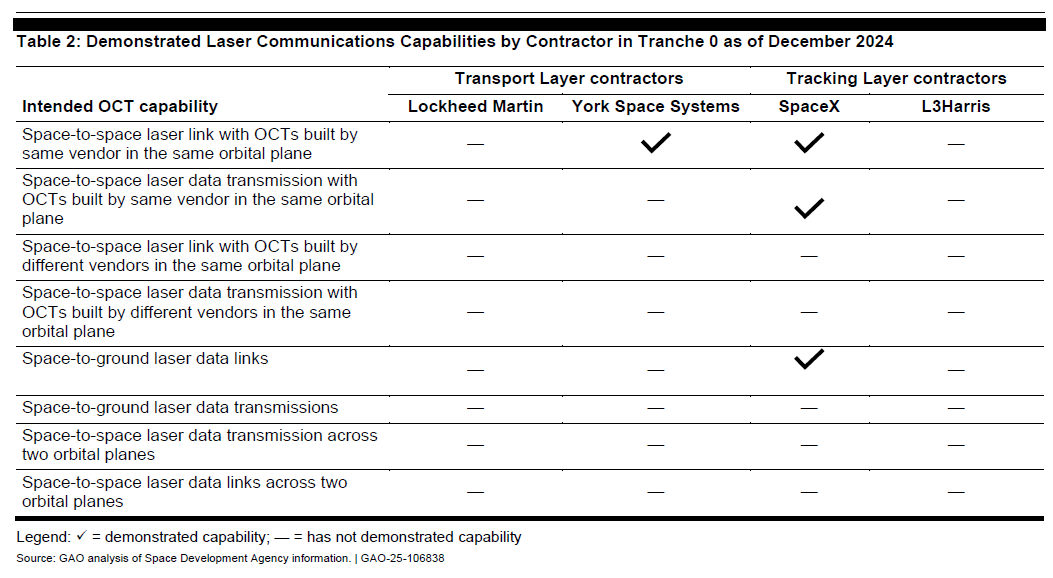
Tranche 0 progress on demonstrating capability as of December 2024. These were planned to be demonstrated 6 months after launch.

In 2025, the Government Accountability Office reported on the laser communication in space aspects of the transport layer development, which it noted was expected to cost nearly $35 billion to 2029. It found that the demonstration tranche (Tranche 0 or T0) had faced development challenges and delays and had not fully demonstrated capabilities including laser communication in space. It said the SDA had awarded contracts worth almost $10 billion for Tranche 1 and Tranche 2 of increased complexity based on designs that had not yet met initial capabilities. The GAO made several recommendations including that SDA demonstrate laser communications capabilities before making further investments in subsequent tranches.

In May 2026, a new contractor in the transport layer, SpaceX, was selected for a Space Data Network Backbone which "accelerates the delivery of a resilient, high-speed communications network in space", and will likely use SpaceX Starshield satellites to provide an "expanded optically interconnected mesh of satellites delivering worldwide tactical communications and broadband communication services" which will later "come together" with the existing SDA development. This is a $2.29 billion fixed-price contract.

== Projects and research ==
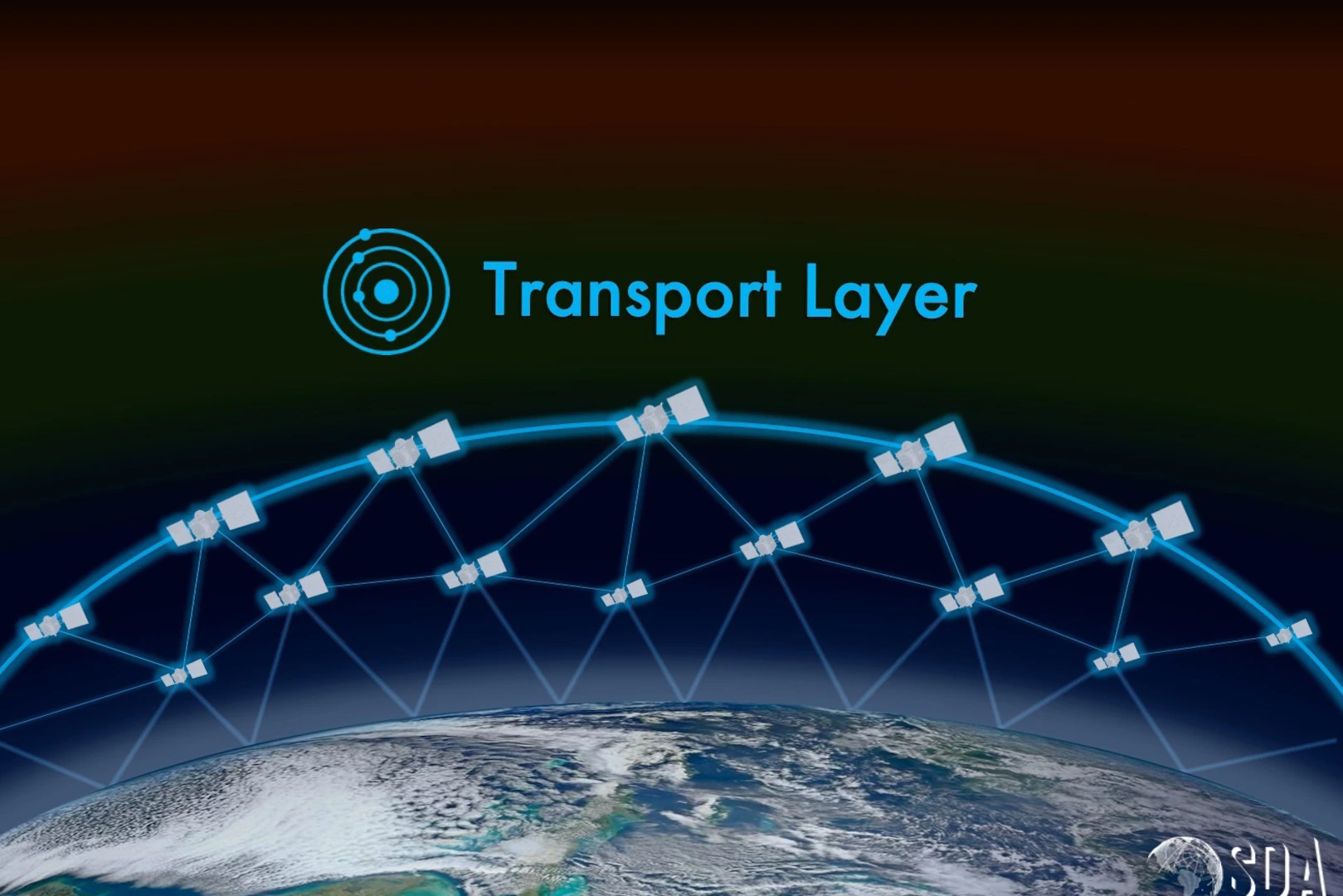
Transport layer of the National Defense Space Architecture (NDSA)

The Assistant Secretary of the Air Force for Space Acquisition and Integration (SAF/SQ) visits SDA upon its accession to USSF.

Rapid Reaction Launch Proliferated Ground C2 for the NDSA (National defense space architecture) of the Space Development Agency

SDA satellites are the first to have direct-to-weapon control, as noted by SDA's technical director, Frank Turner. This capability allows for a seamless connection between the satellite data and weapon systems. The Beta satellites will attempt "extremely difficult" contacts with aircraft and missiles in flight, Turner said.

Among the SDA projects:

- "Optical communications between satellites, and from satellites to a military drone aircraft". Including the CubeSat based Laser Interconnect and Networking Communication System (LINCS).
- Provide a resilient, persistent response to ballistic missile detection
- Build the JADC2 satellite backbone using the National Defense Space Architecture (NDSA): (Note: In September 2021 the Space Development Agency approved design plans for its new missile warning satellites, which will be capable of detecting and tracking hypersonic weapons.: L3Harris Technologies announced that the Space Development Agency has approved the company's proposed design for a missile tracking satellite. A production contract for 16 Tranche 1 Tracking satellites to track hypersonic missiles, for launch in 2025, was approved.; SpaceX will build 4 satellites for the Tranche 0 tracking layer.) JADC2 confers on the US the capability to "move data globally at scale". —Gen. Chance Saltzman, US Space Force
  - The satellite constellations are in near-polar low Earth orbit. Hundreds of satellites are expected by the end of the 2020s. "Would you be able to take out some of these satellites? Probably. Would you be able to take out all of these satellites? Probably not, before you are going to have a really bad day."—Derek Tournear
  - NExT (National Defense Space Architecture (NDSA) Experimental Testbed) is a test bed of 10 space vehicles and associated mission-enabling ground systems, for realizing its various aspects, in miniature, before its larger, later scheduled deployments. In particular, the capability to retain and/or relay messages for command and control (C2) can then be demonstrated on the NExT test bed, before deployment at scale.
  - Using the satellites of Tranche 0, the SDA will be demonstrating the new capabilities of the PWSA to the warfighters, to aid in concept development (using the "warfighter immersion tranche").
  - Rapid response launch proliferated C2; SDA remains the rapid launch proliferated arm for the Space Force.
    1. User equipment (Earth stations and weapon systems) SDA has selected the "ground Operations and Integration (O&I) segment for Tranche 1". The Advanced Fire Control Ground Infrastructure (AFCGI) program includes data from LEO satellites.
    2. Transport layer intersatellite data Tranche 1 Transport Layer (T1TL): T1TL forms a mesh network in a constellation of small satellites in Low earth orbit (LEO). Each satellite would have 4 optical links. SDA may have awarded 3 contracts totalling $1.8 billion to 3 firms, each for 42 satellites to be launched by September 2024. However, there was a funding constraint in the FY2022 budget.
    3. Tracking layer handles launched items, connects to existing user equipment Two contractors will each build 14 satellites for the Tranche 1 Tracking Layer as of 16 July 2022; these satellites will be in Low Earth Orbit (LEO) by 2025; hundreds of satellites are planned for the Tracking layer. The Tracking Layer is capable of tracking hypersonic missiles throughout their flight, by their heat signatures.
    4. Custody layer handles items not yet launched from objects as big as a truck, connects to existing user equipment
    5. Battle management ("autonomy, tipping and queuing and data fusion") (Note: In Remote Sensing, Tipping and Queuing (Cueing) is a technique for tracking and monitoring fast-moving objects, using multiple sensors of multiple modalities (for example electro-optical and radar sensors). One sensor with a wide field of view might detect, acquire, and even track an object of interest (the 'target'); that sensor would 'tip' another sensor with the tracking information for that target. The next sensor, say with point defense capability, might then take the 'cue' to narrow the tracking box around the target, to build more accurate tracking information, to tip yet another defense system, and so forth. See Automatic identification system (AIS))
    6. Navigation layer is not finalized, provides navigation & launch data
    7. Deterrence layer is situational awareness of cislunar space vehicles

== Launches ==
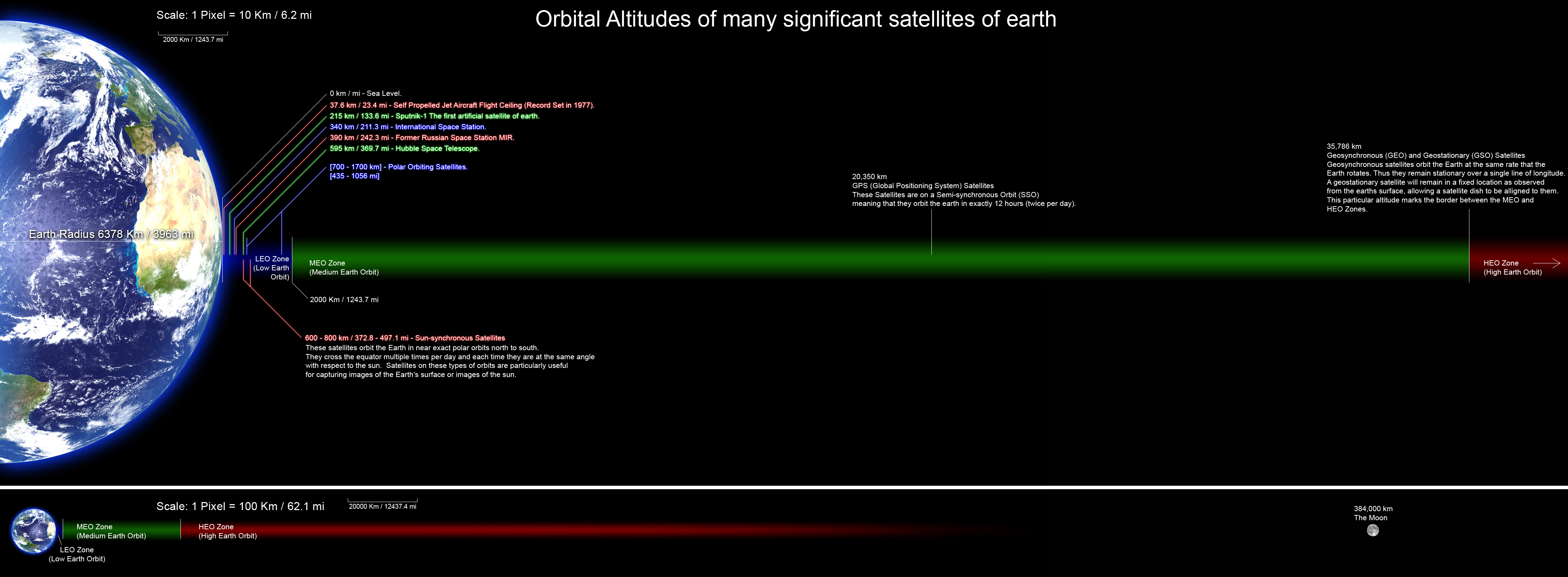
Earth's satellites in: Low Earth orbit— LEO (blue); Medium Earth orbit— MEO (green); Cislunar distances (red): If one were to hold a blue marble out at arm's length, one would see Earth's size and shape from the perspective of the astronauts travelling to the Moon.

SDA's initial launch of 10 satellites (denoted Tranche 0) had been scheduled for December 2022; however tests of 8 of these satellites indicated that each had a noisy power supply. The contractor, York Space Systems retrofitted filters on the 8 satellites at no cost to the government; the initial launch was delayed to March 2023, including the 8 retrofitted by York Space Systems.

On 2 April 2023 the first 10 satellites of Tranche 0 were launched into low earth orbit, as planned. These satellites will demonstrate the responsive (low latency) communication links of the Transport layer of the Proliferated Warfighter Space Architecture (PWSA). An initial checkout of the satellite bus and mission payloads is the current priority. The second Tranche 0 launch, carrying 13 more satellites, took place on 2 September 2023. Of the 18 initially scheduled payloads one Transport satellite built by York has been excluded to conduct software tests, while the four Tracking satellites built by L3Harris had been kept on the ground by production delays and were launched later as rideshare payloads of a USSF-124 mission in February 2024.

=== Tranche 0 ===
Tranche 0 satellites
Manufacturer	Nickname	Built	Launched			On the ground	Decayed
Manufacturer	Nickname	Built	Tranche 0A (02 Apr 2023)	Tranche 0B (02 Sep 2023)	USSF-124 (15 Feb 2024)	On the ground	Decayed
Tracking layer
SpaceX	BB	4	2	2	0	0	
L3Harris	Raptor	4	0	0	4	0	
Transport layer
York Space Systems	Checkmate	A-Class: 6 B-Class: 4	A-Class: 5 B-Class: 3	A-Class: 0 B-Class: 1	-	A-Class: 1 B-Class: 0	
Lockheed Martin	Wildfire	A-Class: 7 B-Class: 3	-	A-Class: 7 B-Class: 3	-	-	

=== Tranche 1 ===
Tranche 1 satellites
Manufacturer	Nickname	Built	Launched				On the ground	Decayed
Manufacturer	Nickname	Built	Transporter-14 (23 June 2025)	Tranche T1TL-B (10 September 2025)	Tranche T1TL-C (15 October 2025)	Tranche T1TL-E (16 July 2026)	On the ground	Decayed
Tracking layer
Northrop Grumman	-	14	0	0	0	0	0	
L3Harris	-	14	0	0	0	0	0	
Transport layer
York Space Systems	Praetorian	42	-	21	0	21	0	
Lockheed Martin	-	42	0	0	21	0	0	
Northrop Grumman	-	42	0	0	0	0	0	
Demonstration and Experimentation System
York Space Systems	Dragoon	12	1	0	0	0	0	

=== Tranche 2 ===
Tranche 2 satellites
Manufacturer	Nickname	Built	Launched	On the ground	Decayed
Manufacturer	Nickname	Built	T2TL-A (August 2026)	On the ground	Decayed
Tracking layer
Northrop Grumman	-	18	0	0	
L3Harris	-	18	0	0	
Sierra Space	-	18	0	0	
Transport layer
York Space Systems	-	Alpha:62; Gamma:10	0	0	
Northrop Grumman	-	Alpha:38; Beta:36	0	0	
Lockheed Martin	-	Beta:36	0	0	
Rocket Lab	-	Beta:18	0	0	
TBA	-	Gamma:10	0	0	

=== Tranche 3 ===
Tranche 3 satellites
Manufacturer	Nickname	Built	Launched	Decayed
Tracking layer
Northrop Grumman	-	18	0	
L3Harris	-	18	0	
Rocket Lab	-	18	0	
Lockheed Martin	-	18	0	
Transport layer
TBA				

== Management ==
SDA began as a direct reporting unit (DRU) of DoD's USD(R&E): research and engineering. By design, the functions for acquisition and sustainment (A&S) are the responsibility of another under secretary of defense —the USD(A&S); this separation of function decouples the technology development of a working prototype system, even the systems as complicated as those taken on by the SDA, from overcomplication induced by the processes of the DoD.

The SDA has relied heavily on "Section 804" Mid-Tier Acquisitions (MTAs) to avoid traditional defense procurement requirements. SDA has been able to forgo a number of reporting activities by breaking up larger programs into numerous two-year rapid fielding projects that each qualify as MTAs. Members of Congress and the Government Accountability Office have said this obfuscates costs and limits transparency. The FY23 omnibus appropriations act, signed by President Joe Biden on 29 December 2022, levies new reporting and certification requirements on the Pentagon regarding the use of MTAs and other rapid prototype programs. Industry participants such as MITRE Acquisition Chief Pete Modigliani have said the new requirements would "drastically impede DoD's rapid acquisition abilities" for SDA and other programs.

No.	Director		Term		
No.	Portrait	Name	Took office	Left office	Duration
-	Fred Kennedy	Fred Kennedy; Acting	March 12, 2019	June 2019	~3 months and 3 days
-	Derek M. Tournear	Derek M. Tournear; Acting	June 2019	October 28, 2019	~4 months and 13 days
1	Derek M. Tournear	Derek M. Tournear	October 28, 2019	January 16, 2025	5 years, 2 months, and 19 days
-	Philip Garrant	Lieutenant General; Philip Garrant; Acting	January 16, 2025	February 5, 2025	20 days
-	William B. Blauser	William B. Blauser; Acting	February 5, 2025	April 16, 2025	2 months and 11 days
1	Derek M. Tournear	Derek M. Tournear	April 17, 2025	September 7, 2025	4 months and 21 days
-	Gurpartap "GP" Sandhoo	Gurpartap "GP" Sandhoo; Acting	September 8, 2025	Incumbent	11 months and 30 days

== See also ==
- Kessler Syndrome
- Automatic Dependent Surveillance–Broadcast
- Automatic identification system (AIS)
- Earth observation
- Intelligence, surveillance and reconnaissance (ISR)
- Joint All-Domain Command and Control (JADC2)
- Satellite navigation
- SpaceX Starshield
- Shijian#Shijian-21 flagged by Gen. James H. Dickinson
