= Optical membrane =

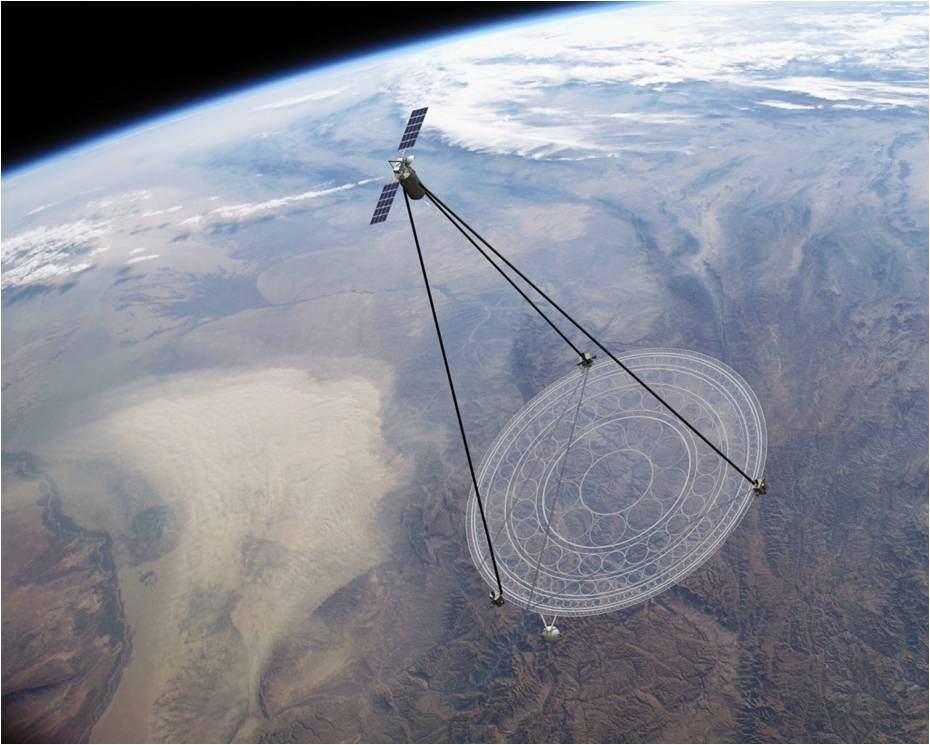

Membrane optics is a flat lens that employs plastic in place of glass to diffract rather than reflect or refract light. Concentric microscopic grooves etched into the plastic provide the diffraction.

Glass transmits light with 90% efficiency, while membrane efficiencies range from 30 to 55%. Membrane thickness is on the order of that of plastic wrap.

== Applications ==
=== MOIRE program ===
DARPA plans to use membrane optics as part of its Membrane Optical Imager for Real-Time Exploitation (MOIRE) program. The program uses lightweight polymer membranes for a 20-meter (66 ft) foldable plastic orbital telescope capable of seeing a 1-meter (3 ft) object from 36,000 km (22,000 mi) away. Membrane grooves range from 4 to hundreds of micrometers in width.

According to DARPA, glass-based optics in satellites are reaching the point where larger mirrors exceed the lifting power of existing rockets. MOIRE is planned to be one-seventh the weight of a comparable glass-mirrored device.

Individual membranes would be mounted on foldable metal petals. Once in geostationary orbit, the satellite would unfold. The membrane lens occupies one end and a sensor suite the other.

The device would be the largest telescope ever built – twice the size of the ground-based twin 10-meter (33 ft) Keck telescopes. It could see about 40 percent of the Earth's surface and could image a 10 km × 10 km (6 mi × 6 mi) area at a 1-metre (3 ft) resolution and generate videos at one frame per second.

A ground-based prototype consists of a section of a 5-meter (20 ft) wide device that created the first images with membrane optics.

== See also ==
- Zone plate
