= Michael D. Griffin =

American physicist and aerospace engineer (born 1949)

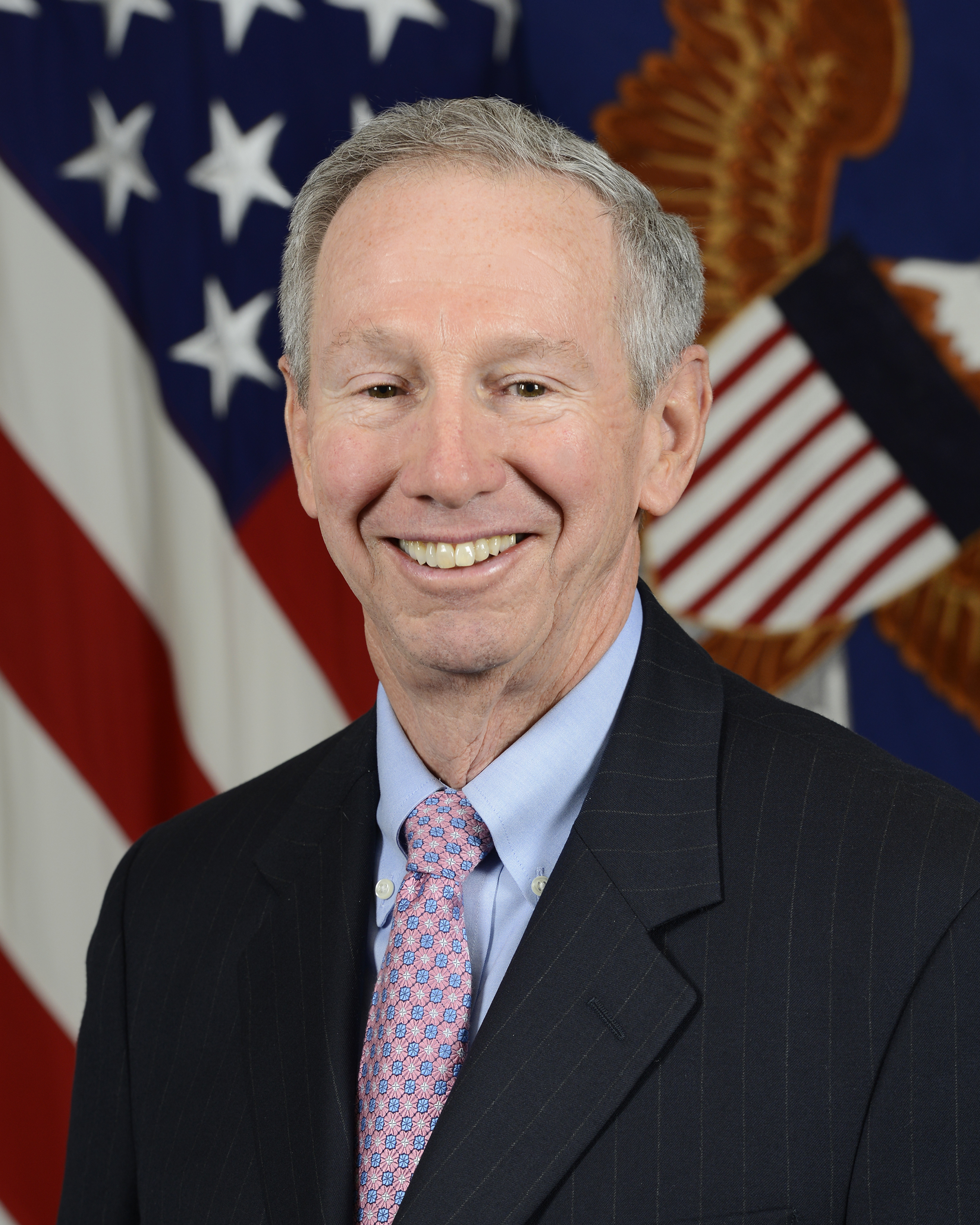
- Official portrait, 2018

Under Secretary of Defense for Research and Engineering
- In office February 19, 2018 – July 10, 2020
- President: Donald Trump
- Preceded by: Position established
- Succeeded by: Heidi Shyu

11th Administrator of the National Aeronautics and Space Administration
- In office April 13, 2005 – January 20, 2009
- President: George W. Bush
- Deputy: Shana Dale
- Preceded by: Sean O'Keefe
- Succeeded by: Charles Bolden

Personal details
- Born: Michael Douglas Griffin; November 1, 1949 (age 77) Aberdeen, Maryland, U.S.
- Education: Johns Hopkins University (BA, MS); Catholic University of America (MSE); University of Maryland (PhD); University of Southern California (MS); George Washington University (MS); Loyola University Maryland (MBA)

Michael Douglas Griffin (born November 1, 1949) is an American physicist and aerospace engineer who served as the under secretary of defense for research and engineering from 2018 to 2020. He previously served as deputy of technology for the Strategic Defense Initiative, and as administrator of NASA from April 13, 2005, to January 20, 2009. As NASA administrator, Griffin oversaw such areas as private spaceflight, future human spaceflight to Mars, and the fate of the Hubble telescope.

== Career ==
Griffin's early career began at APL in the 1980s, where he helped design the successful Delta 180 series of missile defense technology satellites for the Strategic Defense Initiative Organization (SDIO). Griffin soon rose to deputy for technology, where he conceived and directed the first space-to-space interception of a ballistic missile in powered flight, and the first space-borne reconnaissance of ballistic missile targets in boost phase and mid-course flight.

In 1991, Griffin was the president and CTO of Orbital Sciences, then a small entrepreneurial space launch company, with contracts from the government to build low-cost rocket launchers for the Brilliant Pebbles program. Despite early launch failures, in September 1992 they successfully sent a test probe to Mars. In 1995, Griffin authored a report published by The Heritage Foundation, "Ending America's Vulnerability to Ballistic Missiles", offering recommendations for advancing the recently cancelled Brilliant Pebbles program. There he advocated for a new proliferated low Earth orbit constellation of sensors and space-based interceptor weapons to defend against ballistic missiles.

In early 2002 he met entrepreneur Elon Musk and accompanied him on a trip to Russia, where they attempted to purchase ICBMs. The decision to found the company SpaceX was made on the flight home, and Griffin briefly considered serving as chief engineer, but eventually he instead became president and COO of In-Q-Tel, a private enterprise funded by the CIA to identify and invest in companies developing cutting-edge technologies that serve national security interests.

In 2005, he was appointed NASA administrator, where he pushed for commercial cargo and crew transportation services. After a Government Accountability Office protest, Griffin led a reorganization of a Rocketplane-Kistler contract into a competition called the Commercial Orbital Transportation Services (COTS) program. Twenty aerospace companies applied to the COTS program, of which two companies, SpaceX and Griffin's own Orbital Sciences were eventually selected--before SpaceX had successfully launched a single rocket. On COTS, Griffin later said "I was trying to take my In-Q-Tel experience and apply it, transfer it from the CIA over to NASA.” Reports circulated that the larger aerospace companies that considered competing for COTS were chased off by Griffin. Griffin later said he assigned the award selection decision to Scott “Doc” Horowitz--a friend and fellow Mars Society member--"I explained my intentions and he carried it off."

In December 2008, NASA awarded SpaceX and Orbital Sciences additional contracts with a combined value of $3.5 billion as part of the Commercial Resupply Services program. Elon Musk credited these follow-on contracts for saving his company as it neared bankruptcy.

In February 2018, Griffin was appointed as Under Secretary of Defense for Research and Engineering by Donald Trump. One of his first actions was to create the Space Development Agency. The organization was tasked with procuring a proliferated constellation of low Earth orbit satellites called the Proliferated Warfighter Space Architecture, which later become the backbone for the planned Golden Dome (missile defense system). Commercial contracts for the constellation were given to L3Harris and SpaceX to build Starlink military satellites.

Griffin has encouraged the development of boost-glide hypersonic weapons such as the AGM-183 ARRW. In 2020, he signaled that the United States would be making a major investment in production of hypersonic weaponry at scale. In or before 2023, Griffin joined as an advisor to Castelion, a hypersonics weapons startup founded by former SpaceX executives.

Before his appointment as NASA administrator, Griffin was president-elect of American Institute of Aeronautics and Astronautics (AIAA). He is a member of American Astronautical Society and International Academy of Astronautics. Griffin had worked at NASA prior to serving as NASA administrator, including as associate administrator for exploration. When he was nominated as NASA chief, he was head of the Space Department at the Johns Hopkins University Applied Physics Laboratory (APL) in Laurel, Maryland. Griffin has been a professor at various universities, teaching courses in spacecraft design, Applied Math, guidance and navigation, compressible flow, computational fluid dynamics, spacecraft attitude control, aerodynamics, and introductory aerospace engineering. He is lead author of more than two dozen technical papers, and is co-author with James R. French of the astronautical engineering textbook, Space Vehicle Design. Griffin is also a general aviation flight Instructor and Pilot, and owner of a small airplane, a Beech Bonanza. In 2004 Griffin was named head of the Space Department at Johns Hopkins University APL.

== Education ==
Griffin holds seven academic degrees that he earned throughout his career.

- BA degree in physics from Johns Hopkins University in 1971;
- MSE degree in aerospace science from the Catholic University of America in 1974;
- PhD degree in aerospace engineering from the University of Maryland in 1977;
- MS degree in electrical engineering from the University of Southern California in 1979;
- MS degree in applied physics from Johns Hopkins University in 1983;
- MBA degree from Loyola University Maryland in 1990;
- MS degree in civil engineering from George Washington University in 1998. Griffin was also working toward an MS degree in computer science at Johns Hopkins University before being appointed as NASA chief.

In April 2009, Griffin was named eminent scholar and a professor of mechanical and aerospace engineering at the University of Alabama in Huntsville.

== Long-term vision for space ==
In 2004 testimony to Congress on the future of human spaceflight, he stated, "For me, the single overarching goal of human space flight is the human settlement of the Solar System, and eventually beyond. I can think of no lesser purpose sufficient to justify the difficulty of the enterprise, and no greater purpose is possible." In his testimony he also advocated heavy-lift launch capabilities, development of space qualified nuclear power systems, in situ resource utilization, and cost-effective medium-size transport to low Earth orbit. Griffin told a Senate subcommittee that the first book he ever received was a book on astronomy and space when he was five years old, and "I was absolutely fascinated by it, and from that time forward, I never considered for myself anything other than being a Scientist or Engineer or Mathematician and involving myself in the space business."

Griffin has collaborated with several space advocacy organizations such as the National Space Society, Mars Society, and the Planetary Society:

- Griffin and Astronaut Owen K. Garriott were team co-leaders for a study commissioned by the Planetary Society entitled "Extending Human Presence Into the Solar System" in 2004. Griffin cited this study in his first press conference as NASA administrator to answer a question about sending humans to Mars, saying "I would urge you to download that report from the website because I don't have any better thinking to offer you than what I put into that report."
- Griffin was one of the original signatories of the Mars Society, which is dedicated to human settlement of Mars. Mars Society president Robert Zubrin recounts in his 1996 book, The Case for Mars, that in 1991, after Zubrin presented his ideas about a Mars mission architecture with Griffin, then NASA Associate Administrator for Exploration, Griffin presented these ideas to then NASA Administrator Daniel Goldin.
- Griffin shared the plenary talk with Elon Musk at the fourth Mars Society gathering in 2001. It was here that Musk announced his plan to grow plants on Mars.

== NASA administrator ==
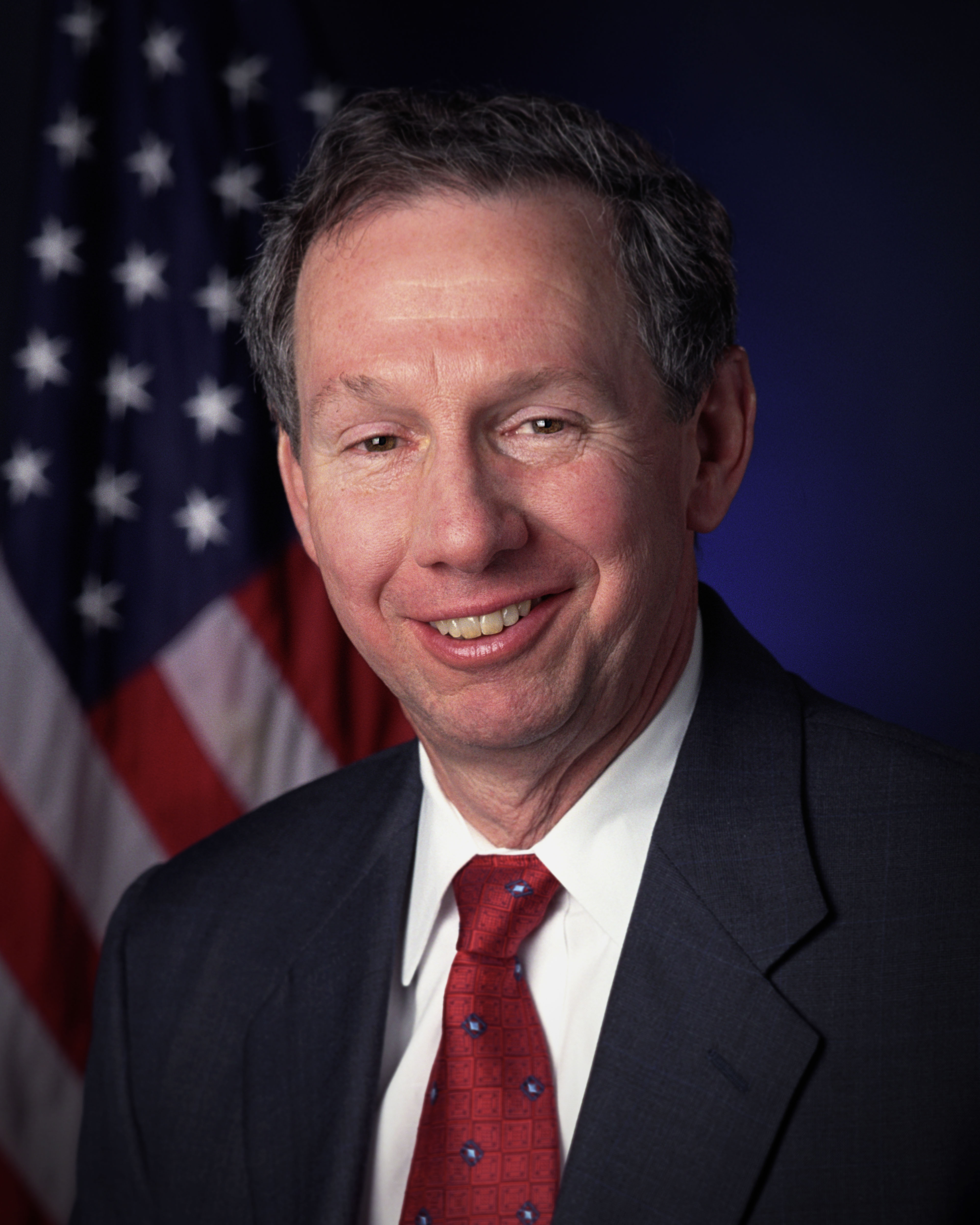
Griffin's official portrait as NASA administrator

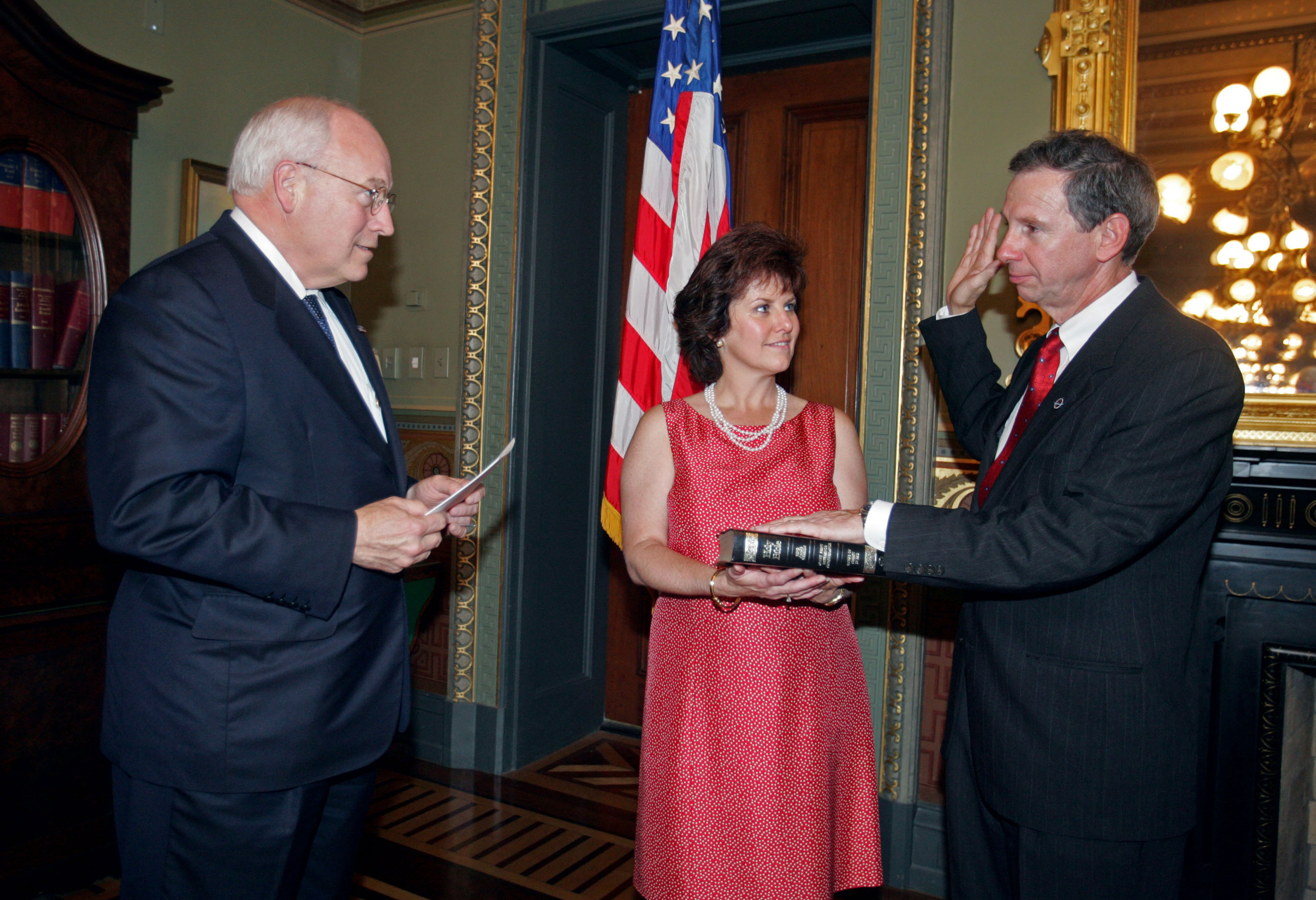
Michael Griffin was formally sworn in by Vice President Dick Cheney on June 28, 2005.

On March 11, 2005, President George W. Bush announced his intention to nominate Griffin to serve as the 11th Administrator of NASA. He was confirmed by the Senate on April 13, 2005. Griffin was subsequently sworn in by Vice-president Dick Cheney, a rarity for a NASA administrator and signifying the importance NASA held to the Bush Administration. Administration even recalled its former NASA transition Team Director and Chief of Staff, Courtney Stadd, to assist Griffin.

On September 28, 2007, Griffin said that NASA aims to put a man on Mars by 2037.

In an interview with The Guardian in July 2008 Griffin stated, in criticism of the Space Shuttle program, that an opportunity to push on to Mars by extending the Apollo program was squandered by a change in focus to Shuttle and space station programs that only reached orbit: "I spent some time analysing what we could have done had we used the budgets we received to explore the capabilities inherent in the Apollo hardware after it was built. The short answer is we would have been on Mars 15 or 20 years ago, instead of circling endlessly in low Earth orbit."

=== Questions concerning NASA budget management ===
Griffin has been criticized by space research organizations such as NASA Ames Research Center life sciences group for shifting portions of NASA's budget from science to human spaceflight. Griffin had stated that he would not shift "one thin dime" of funding from science to human spaceflight, but less than six months later, in February 2006, after NASA Constellation funding did not reach requested levels, NASA revealed a budget that reduced space research funding by about 25%, including indefinite deferrals of planned programs such as the Jupiter Icy Moons Orbiter, the Terrestrial Planet Finder, and the Space Interferometry Mission. The logic was that funding Project Constellation, a presidentially mandated program, was the top priority of the space agency. Funding for a New York Company to research the Prometheus space nuclear program has also been put on hold, although Griffin has said he is anxious to pursue Prometheus after the earlier-priority development of the new spacecraft is completed.

Earlier, in November 2005, funding for life science research conducted largely out of Ames Research Center was cut by 80%, prompting representatives of the Ames life sciences group to write a scathing letter to Griffin criticizing this cut. NASA field centers focused mainly on science rather than on human spaceflight, such as Ames and Glenn Research Center, have seen general budgetary downsizing, and many science contracts with outside researchers have been canceled. Griffin attributed these cuts, along with cuts in the human spaceflight budget, as being necessitated by a $3.2 billion shortfall. The National Research Council also concluded that NASA's total funding has not been enough to fulfill all its mandates and remain strong in science. However, during Griffin's term, science budgets were, as a percentage of NASA's total budget, in line with those during Project Apollo. There has been some discussion, after the release of the Summary Report by the Human Space Flight Committee that NASA has not been funded sufficiently to pursue a strong science program while continuing to focus on aeronautics and space exploration, the two key mission of the NASA. Limitations on NASA's budget include a mandated continuation of the Space Shuttle program, including safety upgrades and testing; the mandated construction of the International Space Station; the mandated development of the Vision for Space Exploration architecture; programs outside of human spaceflight, consisting of science research and aeronautics research; and an ever-increasing share of NASA's budget devoted to line-item earmarks sometimes characterized as pork barrel spending.

=== Struggles to complete ISS before Shuttle program termination ===
Vision for Space Exploration, announced by President Bush in 2004, mandated that NASA must use the Space Shuttle to finish construction of the International Space Station by the end of 2010. By June 2006, due to ongoing concerns with the safety of the Shuttle in the wake of the Columbia disaster, only one flight had been performed. Per the Presidential mandate of the Vision for Space Exploration, Griffin mandated that 18 more Space Shuttle flights be performed in the remaining four and a half years.

Griffin approved the launch of Space Shuttle Discovery for July 2006 to perform the second return-to-flight mission, overriding the NASA Chief Safety and Mission Assurance Officer, Bryan O'Connor. Although O'Connor said there were still unresolved concerns that foam insulation could break off of external fuel tank and damage the orbiter, Griffin characterized the risk as acceptable, arguing that it would be better to test one change at a time. With that flight NASA was testing the removal of protuberance air-load ramps from cable and fuel line fittings on the exterior of the external fuel tank. This launch proved that the changes made to prevent shedding of foam at the air-load ramps were successful, allowing the Shuttle program to work towards completion of the ISS by the presidentially mandated year of 2010. The construction of the ISS was completed in early 2011, and then the Space Shuttle was retired.

=== Global warming views ===
In a follow-up interview to his May 31 interview with NPR's Steve Inskeep airing June 1, 2007, on NPR News' Morning Edition, Griffin said:

I have no doubt that global—that a trend of global warming exists. I am not sure that it is fair to say that it is a problem we must wrestle with. To assume that it is a problem is to assume that the state of Earth's climate today is the optimal climate, the best climate that we could have or ever have had and that we need to take steps to make sure that it doesn't change. First of all, I don't think it's within the power of human beings to assure that the climate does not change, as millions of years of history have shown, and second of all, I guess I would ask which human beings -where and when-are to be accorded the privilege of deciding that this particular climate that we have right here today, right now is the best climate for all other human beings. I think that's a rather arrogant position for people to take.

Some climate scientists referred to his remarks as ignorant. In particular, James E. Hansen, NASA's top official on climate change, said Griffin's comments showed "arrogance and ignorance", as millions will likely be harmed by global warming. Jerry Mahlman, a scientist at the National Center for Atmospheric Research, said that Griffin was either "totally clueless" or "a deep antiglobal warming ideologue". In a closed-door meeting on June 4, 2007, at the Jet Propulsion Laboratory, Griffin said:

"Unfortunately, this is an issue which has become far more political than technical, and it would have been well for me to have stayed out of it." "All I can really do is apologize to all you guys. ... I feel badly that I caused this amount of controversy over something like this."

=== Resignation accepted by new president Obama ===
It was widely known that Griffin hoped to keep his job under President Barack Obama so that Constellation and NASA's other programs could maintain their steady progress. In a phone call on the day after the election, Senator Bill Nelson (D, FL) requested of Lori Garver, who led the incoming Obama Administration's Transition Team, that the Administration allow Griffin to remain as NASA administrator to provide programmatic and management continuity. However, his resignation (required of and offered by all agency heads due to an incoming president) was accepted. In part, this was because of disagreements between Griffin and Garver over the state of Project Constellation. Griffin gave a farewell address to NASA on January 16, 2009, in which he praised NASA for its recovery from the Space Shuttle Columbia disaster and urged employees to support the new administrator, whoever it may be. He left office the day President Obama was inaugurated.

== Later career ==
On April 14, 2009, Griffin accepted a position as eminent scholar and Professor of Mechanical and Aerospace Engineering at the University of Alabama in Huntsville. The university established the eminent scholar position in 1986. Griffin has established the Center for System Studies at the university, which will address the need for "systems thinking" in industry and the government. System studies involve research to understand the many complex ways that technology, nature, people, and society interact so that the workings of an engineered solution are more predictable and more desirable. UA Huntsville is a Space Grant university, and has a history of cooperation with both NASA at the nearby Marshall Space Flight Center, and the U.S. Army Aviation and Missile Command at Redstone Arsenal. The campus serves as the anchor tenant in Cummings Research Park, the second-largest university research park in the USA. In a 2010 Space Foundation survey, Griffin was ranked as the #7 most popular space hero.

On August 14, 2012, the Schafer Corporation announced that Griffin would assume the role of chairman and CEO at the company. The Schafer Corporation is a technology company providing products and professional services to Government and Industry customers. It was founded in 1972.

=== Under Secretary of Defense for Research and Engineering ===
On December 4, 2017, Reuters reported that Griffin was nominated by President Donald Trump to be Under Secretary of Defense for Research and Engineering (USD(R&E)). The U.S. Senate confirmed him by voice vote on February 15, 2018. As the USD(R&E), Griffin established technology modernization priorities for the DoD.

On June 23, 2020, Griffin announced that he was leaving his position as USD(R&E) to pursue a private sector opportunity. His deputy, Lisa Porter, announced her departure on the same date.

=== Rocket Lab ===
In August 2020, Griffin joined the board of directors of Rocket Lab as the company sought to increase its business with the U.S. government. During his tenure, the company developed HASTE, a suborbital variant of its Electron small launch vehicle used to advance hypersonic technology development, and emerged as a satellite prime contractor for the Space Development Agency's Proliferated Warfighter Space Architecture. Griffin retired from the board in September 2024.

== Honors ==
While he describes himself as a "simple aerospace engineer from a small town", Griffin has held several high-profile political appointments. In 2007 he was included in the TIME 100, the magazine's list of the 100 most influential people.

Griffin is the recipient of numerous honors and awards, including the Defense Department's highest award which can be conferred on a Non-Government employee,

- Member of American Astronautical Society
- Member of International Academy of Astronautics
- Member of National Academy of Engineering ‘for technical leadership of the Delta 180/181/183 flight experiments that led to the first quantitative measurements of space intercept physics.’
- Distinguished Public Service Medal (1986);
- AIAA Space Systems Medal (1988),
- Significant Technical Accomplishment Award (Delta 183 Mission Team) from American Defense Preparedness Association (1989);
- NASA Exceptional Achievement Medal (1994);
- Goddard Astronautics Award (2007); and
- Selection by Time Magazine as one of the 100 Most Influential People of 2008.
- Rotary National Award for Space Achievement's National Space Trophy in May 2009.
- On March 13, 2008, Griffin was awarded the title of 74th Honorary Chancellor at Florida Southern College during its annual Founder's Day Ceremony.
- On May 22, 2011, Griffin was awarded honorary DE degree from the University of Notre Dame.
- On July 11, 2018, asteroid 159999 Michaelgriffin was named after him. The main-belt asteroid was discovered by astronomer Marc Buie at the Kitt Peak National Observatory, Arizona, in 2006.
- On January 1, 2020, Michael Griffin was named an IEEE fellow (January 1, 2020).
- In 2026, Griffin received the IEEE Simon Ramo Medal 'for shaping U.S. space exploration strategy and advancing aerospace engineering, including programs that laid the groundwork for today’s crewed spaceflight and deep-space missions.'.
- Honorary Fellow of Royal Aeronautical Society, 2025
- In 2026, Griffin received the IEEE Simon Ramo Medal.

Political offices
Preceded by Sean O'Keefe	Administrator of the National Aeronautics and Space Administration; 2005–2009	Succeeded by Charles Bolden
New office	Under Secretary of Defense for Research and Engineering; 2018–2020	Succeeded by Michael Kratsios (acting)
