= Svend Grønlund =

Danish philatelist

Svend Grønlund (22 March 1893 – 9 May 1977) was a Danish philatelist who was added to the Roll of Distinguished Philatelists in 1964.
