= Flat lens =

A flat lens is a lens whose flat shape allows it to provide distortion-free imaging, potentially with arbitrarily-large apertures. The term is also used to refer to other lenses that provide a negative index of refraction. Flat lenses require a refractive index close to −1 over a broad angular range. In recent years, flat lenses based on metasurfaces were also demonstrated.

== History ==
Russian mathematician Victor Veselago predicted that a material with simultaneously negative electric and magnetic polarization responses would yield a negative refractive index (an isotropic refractive index of −1), a "left-handed" medium in which light propagates with opposite phase and energy velocities.

The first, near-infrared, flat lens was announced in 2012 using nanostructured antennas. It was followed in 2013 by an ultraviolet flat lens that used a bi-metallic sandwich.

In 2014 a flat lens was announced that combined composite metamaterials and transformation optics. The lens works over a broad frequency range.

== Traditional lenses ==
Traditional curved glass lenses can bend light coming from many angles to end up at the same focal point on a piece of photographic film or an electronic sensor. Light captured at the very edges of a curved glass lens does not line up correctly with the rest of the light, creating a fuzzy image at the edge of the frame. (Petzval field curvature and other aberrations.) To correct this, lenses use extra pieces of glass, adding bulk, complexity, and mass.

== Metamaterials ==
Flat lenses employ metamaterials, that is, electromagnetic structures engineered on subwavelength scales to elicit tailored polarization responses.

Left-handed responses typically are implemented using resonant metamaterials composed of periodic arrays of unit cells containing inductive–capacitive resonators and conductive wires. Negative refractive indices that are isotropic in two and three dimensions at microwave frequencies have been achieved in resonant metamaterials with centimetre-scale features.

Metamaterials can image infrared, visible, and, most recently, ultraviolet wavelengths.

== Types ==
=== Graphene oxide ===
With the advances in micro- and nanofabrication techniques, continued miniaturization of conventional optical lenses has been requested for applications such as communications, sensors, and data storage. Specifically, smaller and thinner micro lenses are needed for subwavelength optics or nano-optics with small structures, for visible and near-IR applications. As the distance scale for optical communications shrinks, the required feature sizes of micro lenses shrink.

Graphene oxide provides solutions to advance planar focusing devices. Giant refractive index modification (as large as 10^-1 or one order of magnitude larger than earlier materials), between graphene oxide (GO) and reduced graphene oxide (rGO) were demonstrated by manipulating its oxygen content using direct laser writing (DLW) method. The overall lens thickness potentially can be reduced by more than ten times. Also, the linear optical absorption of GO increases as the reduction of GO deepens, which results in transmission contrast between GO and rGO and therefore provides an amplitude modulation mechanism. Moreover, both the refractive index and optical absorption are dispersionless over a wavelength range from visible to near infrared. GO film offers flexible patterning capability by using the maskless DLW method, which reduces manufacturing complexity.

A novel ultrathin planar lens on a GO thin film used the DLW method. Its advantage is that phase modulation and amplitude modulation can be achieved simultaneously, which are attributed to the giant refractive index modulation and the variable linear optical absorption of GO during its reduction process, respectively. Due to the enhanced wavefront shaping capability, the lens thickness is subwavelength scale (~200 nm), which is thinner than dielectric lenses (~ μm scale). The focusing intensities and the focal length can be controlled effectively by varying laser power and lens size, respectively. By using oil immersion high numerical aperture (NA) objective during DLW process, 300 nm fabrication feature size on GO film has been realized, and therefore the minimum lens size reached 4.6 μm in diameter, the smallest planar micro lens. This can only be realized with metasurface by FIB. Thereafter, the focal length can be reduced to as small as 0.8 μm, which would potentially increase the NA and the focusing resolution.

The full-width at half-maximum (FWHM) of 320 nm at the minimum focal spot using a 650 nm input beam has been demonstrated experimentally, which corresponds to an effective NA of 1.24 (n=1.5). Furthermore, ultra-broadband focusing capability from 500 nm to as far as 2 μm have been realized with this planar lens.

=== Nanoantennas ===
The first flat lens used a thin wafer of silicon 60 nanometers thick coated with concentric rings of v-shaped gold nanoantennas to produce photographic images. The antennas refract the light so that it all ends up on a single focal plane, a so-called artificial refraction process. The antennas were surrounded by an opaque silver/titanium mask that reflected all light that did not strike the antennas. Varying the arm lengths and angle provided the required range of amplitudes and phases. The distribution of the rings controls focal length.

The refraction angle—more at the edges than in the middle—is controlled by the antennas' shape, size, and orientation. It could focus only a single near-infrared wavelength.

Nanoantennas introduce a radial distribution of phase discontinuities, thereby generating respectively spherical wavefronts and nondiffracting Bessel beams. Simulations show that such aberration-free designs are applicable to high-numerical aperture lenses such as flat microscope objectives.

In 2015 a refined version used an achromatic metasurface to focus different wavelengths of light at the same point, employing a dielectric material rather than a metal. This improves efficiency and can produce a consistent effect by focusing red, blue and green wavelengths at the same point to achieve instant color correction, yielding a color image. This lens does not suffer from the chromatic aberrations, or color fringing, that plague refractive lenses. As such, it does not require the additional lens elements traditionally used to compensate for this chromatic dispersion.

=== Bi-metallic sandwich ===
A bi-metallic flat lens is made of a sandwich of alternating nanometer-thick layers of silver and titanium dioxide. It consists of a stack of strongly-coupled plasmonic waveguides sustaining backward waves. It exhibits a negative index of refraction regardless of the incoming light's angle of travel. The waveguides yield an omnidirectional left-handed response for transverse magnetic polarization. Transmission through the metamaterial can be turned on and off using higher frequency light as a switch, allowing the lens to act as a shutter with no moving parts.

=== Membrane ===
Membrane optics employ plastic in place of glass to diffract rather than refract or reflect light. Concentric microscopic grooves etched into the plastic provide the diffraction.

Glass transmits light with 90% efficiency, while membrane efficiencies range from 30-55%. Membrane thickness is on the order of that of plastic wrap.

=== Holographic lenses ===
Holographic lenses are made from a hologram of a conventional lens. It is flat, and present any drawbacks of the original lens (aberrations), plus the drawbacks of the hologram (diffraction).

The hologram of a mathematical lens is flat, and it has the properties of the mathematical lens, but it has the drawbacks of the hologram (diffraction).

=== Geometric-phase lenses ===
Geometric phase lenses, also known as polarization-directed flat lenses are made by depositing liquid crystal polymer in a pattern to make a "holographically recorded wavefront profile". They exhibit a positive focal length for circularly polarized light of one direction, and a negative focal length for circularly polarized light of one direction.

== See also ==
- Metamaterial
- Superlens
- Zone plate
