= Lisbeth Gronlund =

American physicist and nuclear disarmament expert

Lisbeth Dagmar Gronlund (born 1959) is an American physicist and nuclear disarmament expert, the former co-director of the Global Security Program for the Union of Concerned Scientists.

== Education and career ==
Gronlund graduated from the University of California, Santa Barbara in 1982, majoring in physics, and earned her Ph.D. at Cornell University in 1989 with a dissertation concerning quasicrystals.

After postdoctoral research at the Massachusetts Institute of Technology (MIT) in the MIT Defense and Arms Control Studies Program, and two years as an SSRC-MacArthur Foundation Fellow in International Peace and Security at the University of Maryland Center for International Security Studies, she joined the Union of Concerned Scientists as a staff scientist in 1992, also becoming a research fellow in the MIT Security Studies Program. She retired as co-director of Global Security at the Union of Concerned Scientists in 2020.

== Recognition ==
In 2001, Gronlund was named a Fellow of the American Physical Society (APS), after a nomination from the APS Forum on Physics and Society, "in recognition of her many important contributions to arms control, including work on missile defense, missile capabilities and the nuclear fuel cycle as it relates to proliferation, made possible by her ability to analyze technical issues and by her community". She was elected as a Fellow of the American Association for the Advancement of Science in 2007.

Gronlund was also one of the 2001 winners of the Joseph A. Burton Forum Award of the APS, "for creative and sustained leadership in building an international arms-control-physics community and for their own excellence in arms-control physics". She shared the award with George N. Lewis and David C. Wright, of the MIT Security Studies Program and Union of Concerned Scientists respectively.
