= Grønland =

Grønland (and variants) may refer to:

== People ==
- Laurits Grønland (1887–1957), Norwegian politician
- Peter Grønland (1761–1825), Danish composer

== Places ==
- Grønland, the Danish and Norwegian name for Greenland
- Grønland, Oslo, a neighbourhood in Oslo, Norway
  - Grønland (station), a rapid transit station on the Oslo Metro
- Grønland, Agder, a village in Tvedestrand municipality in Agder county, Norway
- Groenland mountains, a small range of mountains in Western Cape, South Africa

== Other ==
- HDMS Grønland, Ship-of-the-line, Danish-Norwegian navy (1756)
- Grönland, German research ship
- Grönland Records, a record label
