= Grönlund =

Grönlund is a Finnish surname. Notable people with the surname include:

- Ernst Grönlund (1902–1968), Finnish football and bandy player
- Peter Grönlund (born 1977), Swedish filmmaker
- Timo Grönlund (born 1954), Finnish sprint canoer
- Tommi Grönlund (born 1969), Finnish football player
