= ABM-1 Galosh =

A-350
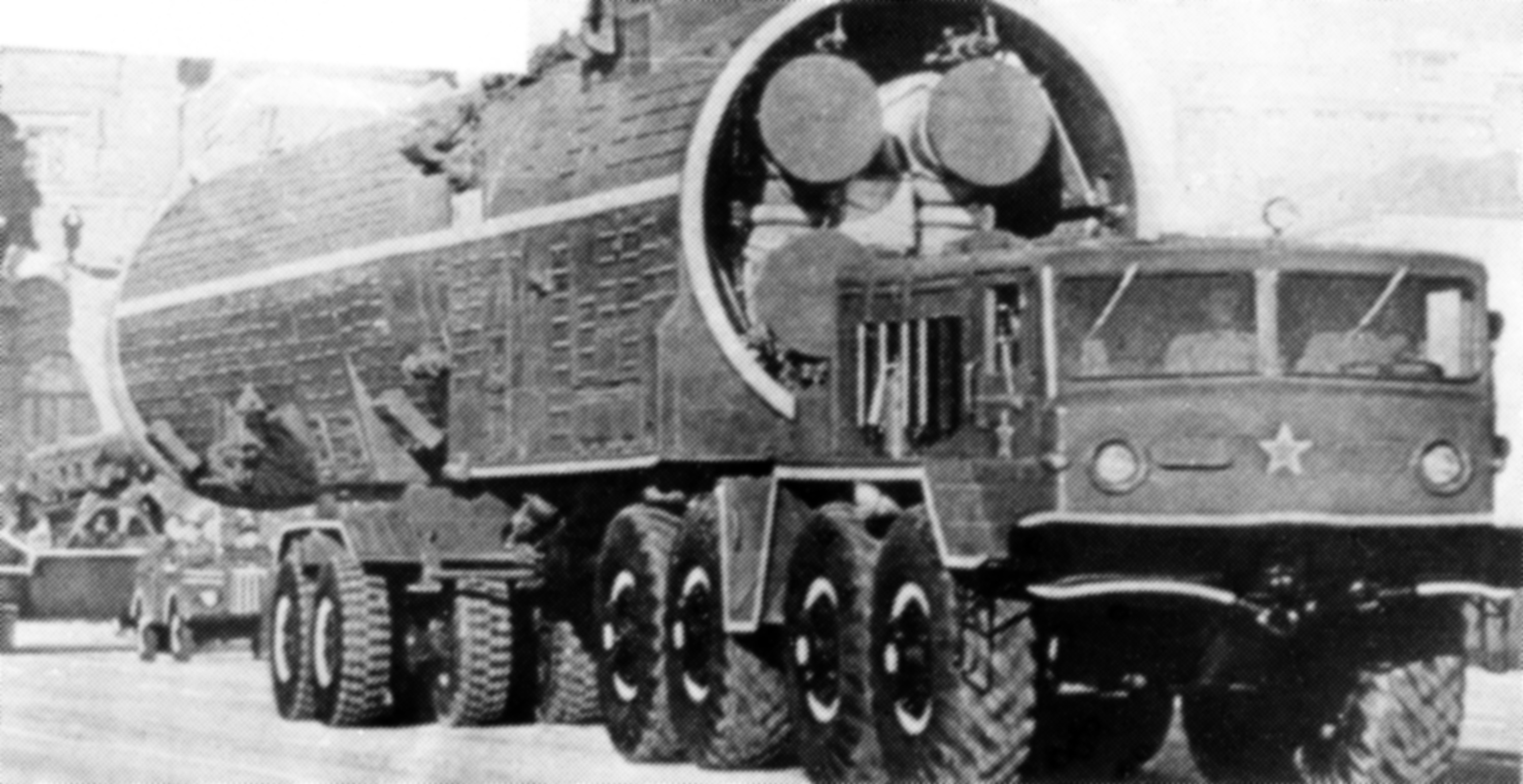
- An A-350 anti-ballistic missile launcher
- Type: anti-ballistic missile (ABM)
- Place of origin: Soviet Union

Service history
- In service: Phase 1: 1972 A-350; Phase 2; 1974 A-350R (Design 1962); Phase 3: 1978 A-35M System
- Used by: Soviet Union
- Wars: Cold War

Production history
- Manufacturer: TsNPO Vympel and NIIRP; A-35/A-35M Systems; Designer: K. B. Kisunko; A-350/A-350R Missiles; Designer: P. D. Grushin
- Unit cost: unknown

Specifications
- Mass: 32,700 kg
- Length: 19,800 mm
- Diameter: 2,570 mm
- Wingspan: 6,000 mm
- Warhead: 2–3 Megaton; A-350 thermonuclear weapon
- Detonation mechanism: unknown
- Engine: solid fuel rocket motor (3) w/ RD-O15T ramjet First stage: 4 × solid rocket boosters 5S47; Second stage: 5D22 liquid rocket
- Operational range: 320–350 km
- Flight ceiling: 120 km exosphere
- Flight altitude: unknown
- Maximum speed: Mach 4
- Guidance system: Radar Command guidance
- Launch platform: A-35 Aldan

The A-350 (GRAU 5V61) (NATO reporting name ABM-1 Galosh) was a Soviet, nuclear armed surface-to-air anti-ballistic missile. The A-350 was a component of the A-35 anti-ballistic missile system. Its primary mission was to destroy U.S. Minuteman and Titan intercontinental ballistic missiles targeting Moscow.

The A-350 was introduced during the 1960s with mechanically steered semi-active radar guidance. It contained a high-yield nuclear warhead, comparable to the U.S. Nike Zeus.

The A-350R (NATO reporting name ABM-1B) was introduced with the advanced A-35M missile system and became operational during 1978. This system was tested at the Sary Shagan Launch Facility with five test flights during 1971, 1976, and 1977, with two more tests during 1993 and 1999.

The next generation of missiles, introduced with the A-135 ABM System, were the 53T6 (1970s) and the 51T6 (1980s).

== Design ==
The A-350 was a three-stage solid-fueled design with a range of over 300 kilometers. It was improved with a restartable liquid-fueled third stage. This gave a much improved post-launch and re-targeting capabilities. The A-350 are launched from above-ground launchers.

The missile design was done by MKB Fakel's Chief Designer Petr Grushin.

The system had multiple radars during the different phases including the Don-2N radar and Dnestr radar early warning systems, and the Dunay radar target acquisition systems. The A-35 with radar was designed by Chief Designer K. B. Kisunko.

=== Radar systems ===
The idea for this system was to protect Moscow from nuclear attack by the United States. The Soviet government began studies during 1958 with preliminary designs from General Designer K. B. Kisunko. Further designs and development were moved to TsNPO Vympel. Radar systems were tested with Duna-3 single direction search radar and the Dunay-3U omni-direction 360-degree search radar, designed by V. P. Sosulnikov and A. N. Musatov, respectively. A more advanced system of radars were included, the Don-2N System; consisting of the 6000 km long-range early warning radars Don-2N and Dnestr, (NATO code names Pill Box and Hen House), and the 2800 km short-range target acquisition radars Dunay-3M and Dunay-3U (NATO codenames Dog House and Cat House).

=== Missile warhead ===
The A-350 developed through a period of growth and modifications. Configurations included an improved A-350Zh with tests during 1973. Eventually, the design changed again with radiation-hardened cases and became the A-350R for Phase 2 deployment in 1974.

== Construction ==
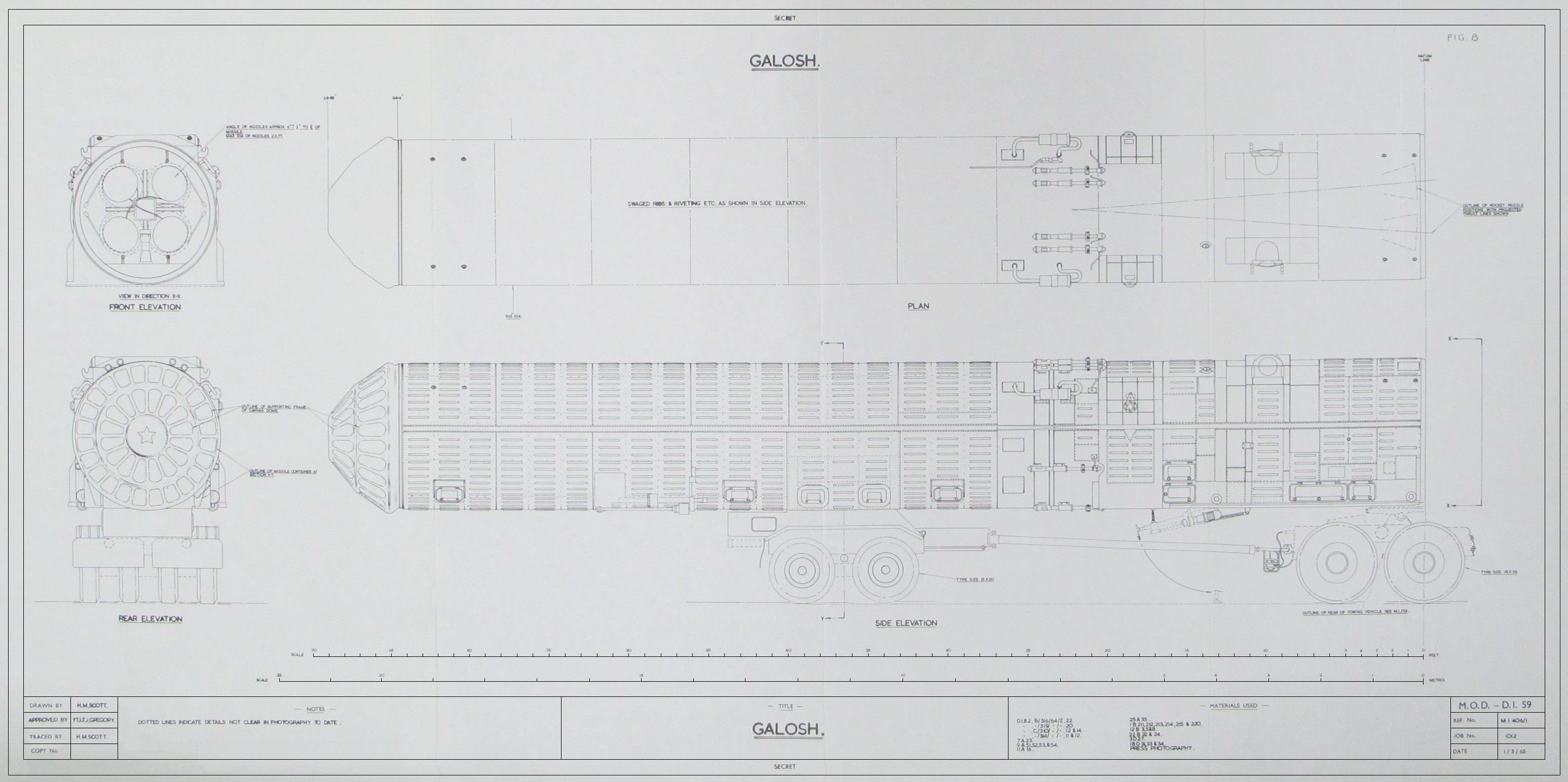
Declassified UK Ministry of Defence drawing created from Red Square May Day photographs and other intelligence sources.

The construction of the A-35 system began during 1962 with 16 primary sites including command post, radar installations and firing complexes for 8–16 missile launchers. Some of the existing sites of the old S-25 Berkut were modified. Some known locations are: Naro-Fominsk, Olenegorsk, Skrunda, Angarsk, Nikolaeyev, and Sary Shagan.

One of the Dunay radar (NATO Code : Dog House) phased array radar systems was located at Naro-Fominsk. This system is comparable to the US's PAVE PAWS radars of the Sentinel and Safeguard ABM programs.

The construction plan changed a number of times, varying the locations, sectors or quadrants, and number of launchers. The system finalized at 8 sites with total of 64 launchers, with 4 major radar centers completed.

== Advanced A-35M system (ABM-1B) ==
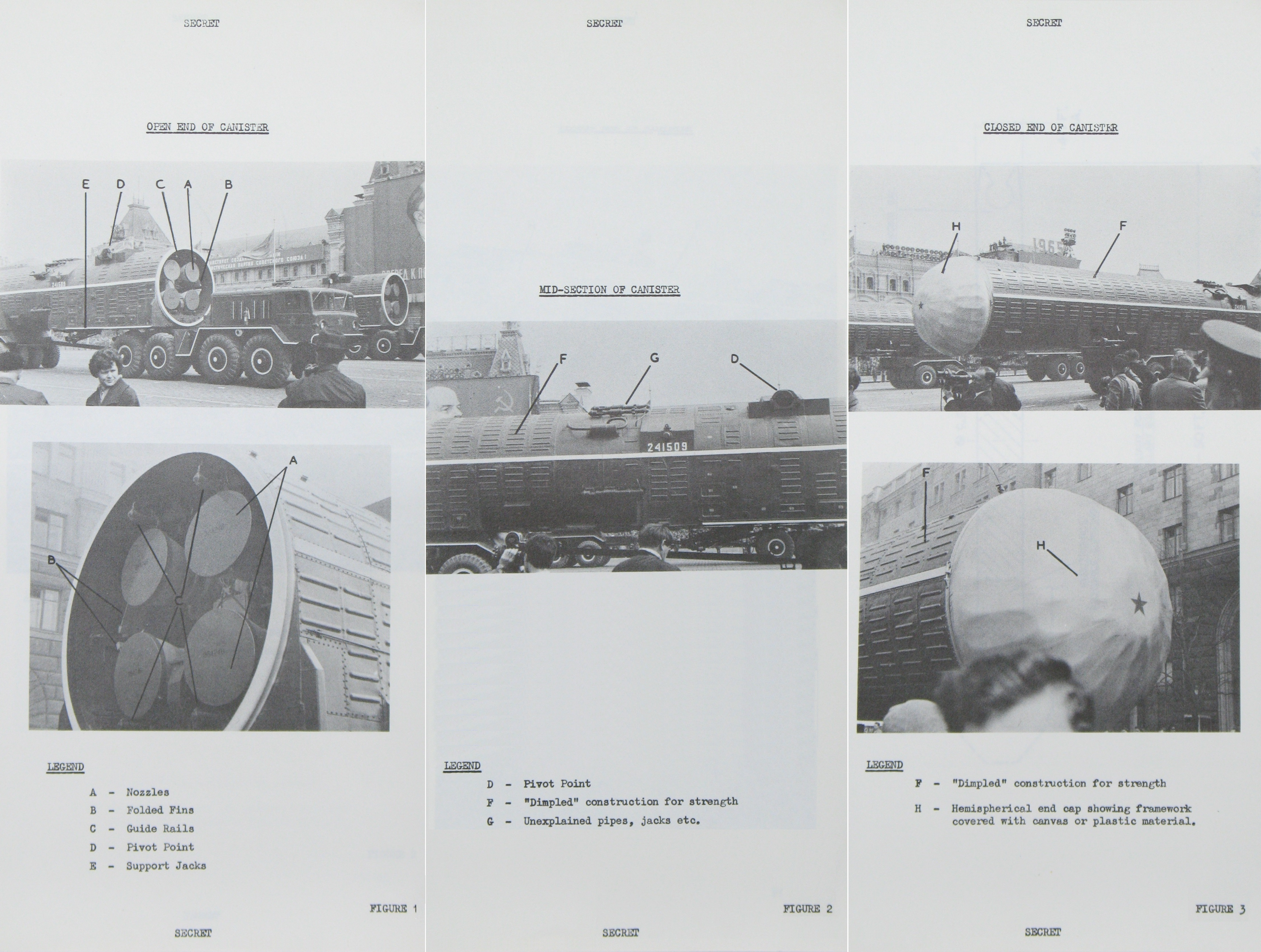
Intelligence photographs from a declassified UK Ministry of Defence folder of a A-350 in the Red Square May Day Parade 1964.

With on-going advancements in the ABM system, radars, missile and warheads, the evolution of the A-35 became the A-35M. The "M" for modernization, was brought on through the advanced developments at 10 different Soviet institutes. One primary upgrade was in the Dunay-3U radar systems enhanced with a dedicated sector search functionality. Along with other upgrades, actual air tests were performed with different configurations between 1976 and 1977. Phase 3 of the A-35M went on-line in 1978.

== See also ==
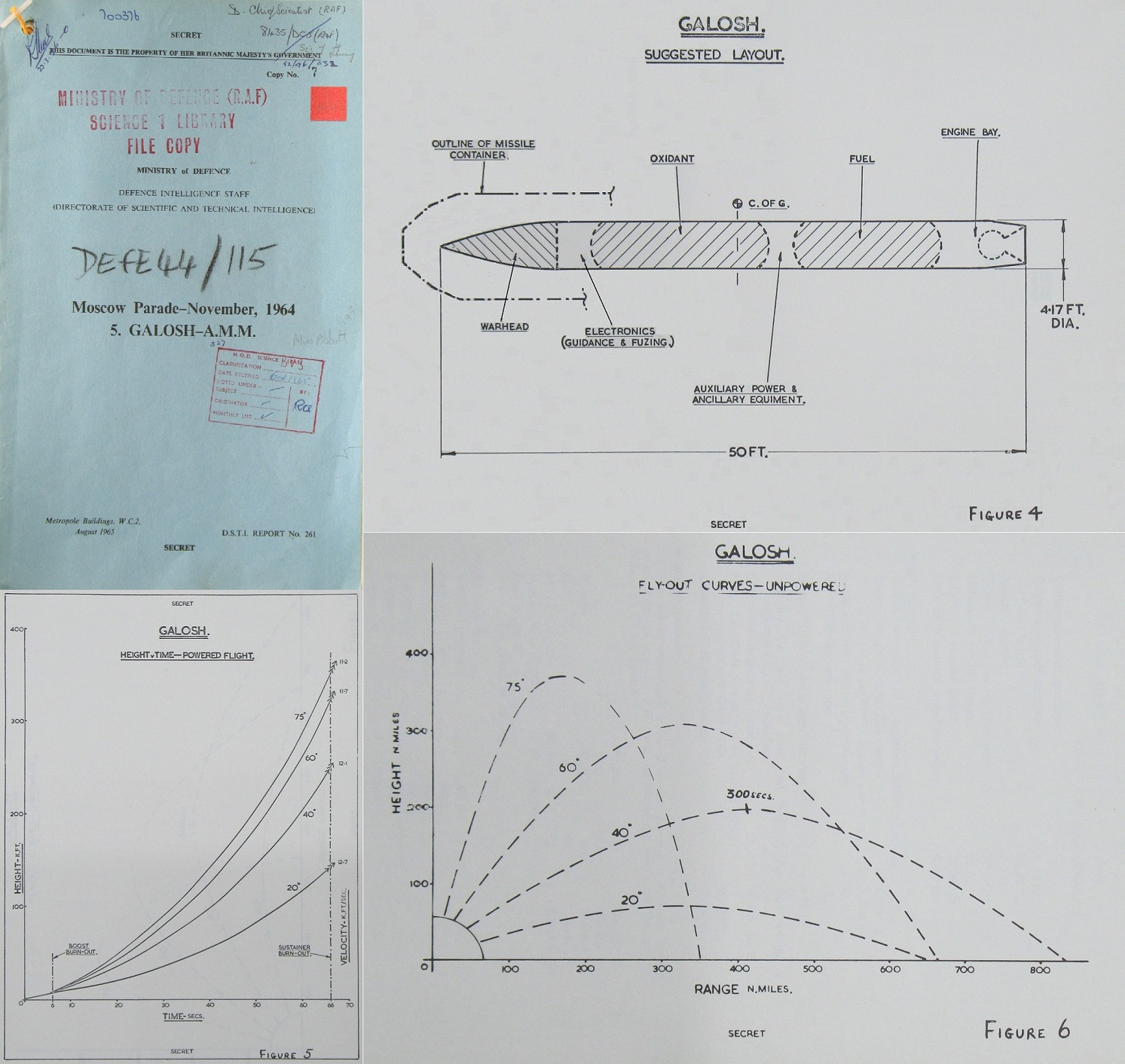
UK Ministry of Defence data reproduced from a declassified folder in the National Archives, London.

- List of missiles
- Comparison of anti-ballistic missile systems
- Strategic Defense Initiative

Treaties

- Strategic Arms Limitation Talks
- Anti-Ballistic Missile Treaty

Related US missiles

- Nike Zeus
- Sprint (missile)
- LIM-49A Spartan
