= United States national missile defense =

Global missile defense program of the United States

National missile defense (NMD) refers to the nationwide anti-missile program the United States has had under development since the 1990s. After the renaming in 2002, the term now refers to the entire program, not just the ground-based interceptors and associated facilities.

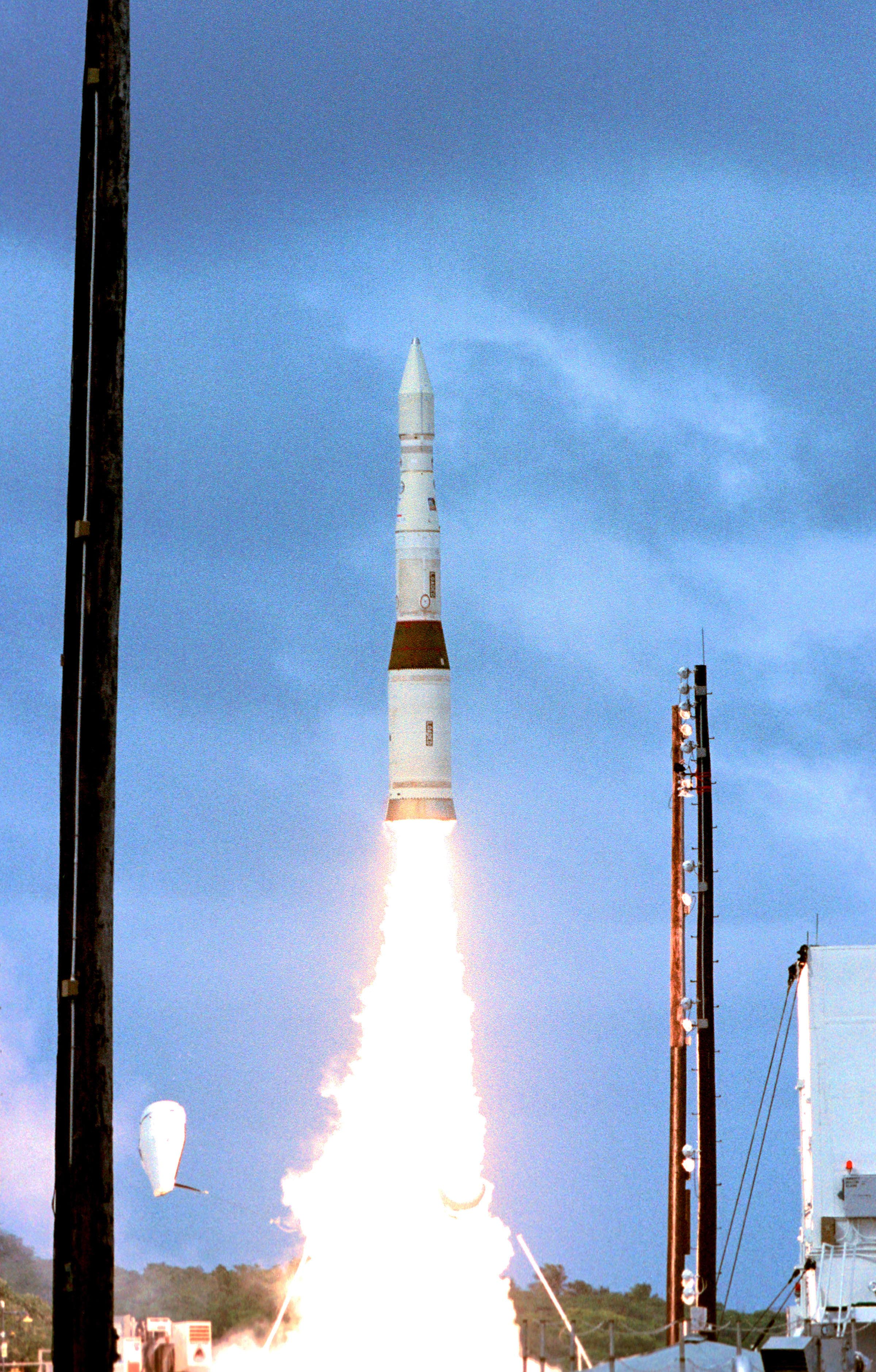
A Payload Launch Vehicle (PLV) carrying a prototype exoatmospheric kill vehicle is launched from Meck Island at the Kwajalein Missile Range on 3 December 2001, for an intercept of a ballistic missile target over the central Pacific Ocean.

Other elements that could potentially be integrated into NMD include anti-ballistic missiles, or sea-based, space-based, laser, and high altitude missile systems. The NMD program is limited in scope and designed to counter a relatively small ICBM attack from a less sophisticated adversary. Unlike the earlier Strategic Defense Initiative program, it is not designed to be a robust shield against a large attack from a technically sophisticated adversary.

== Definitions ==
The term "national missile defense" has several meanings:

- (Most common, but now deprecated:) U.S. National Missile Defense, the limited ground-based nationwide antimissile system in development since the 1990s. In 2002 this system was renamed to Ground-Based Midcourse Defense (GMD), to differentiate it from other missile defense programs, such as space-based, sea-based, laser, robotic, or high-altitude intercept programs. As of 2006, the GMD system is operational with limited capability. GMD is designed to intercept a small number of nuclear-armed ICBMs in the mid-course phase, using Ground-based interceptor missiles (GBIs) launched from within the United States in Alaska and California. GMD uses non-nuclear GBIs with a kinetic warhead. Other components of the national missile defense are listed below.
- Any national ICBM defense by any country, past or present. The U.S. Sentinel program was a planned national missile defense during the 1960s, but was never deployed. Elements of Sentinel were actually deployed briefly as the Safeguard Program, although it wasn't national in scope. The Russian A-135 anti-ballistic missile system is currently operational only around the city of Moscow, the national capital, and is far from being national in scope in Russia.
- Any national missile defense (against any missile type) by any country. Israel currently has a national missile defense against short and medium-range missiles using their Arrow missile system.

See trajectory phase for the types of anti-ballistic missiles, the advantages and the disadvantages of each implementation type. The role of defense against nuclear missiles has been a heated military and political topic for several decades. (See also nuclear strategy, Missile Defense Agency, and anti-ballistic missile.) But missile defense against a known ballistic missile trajectory has to be rethought in the face of a maneuverable threat (such as a hypersonic glide vehicle, which still has yet to be realized and proven, as of 2018). See Hypersonic flight § Hypersonic weapons development, and Hypersonic glide phase interceptor (GPI) (2021).

== History of national missile defense systems ==
When the United States Air Force was split from the United States Army in 1947, the Army retained the role of ground based air defenses that would evolve into National missile defense. The Army retained the lead role in this area until the success of the Aegis system shifted the focus to the United States Navy in the 21st century.

=== Nike-Zeus ===
In the 1950s, a series of anti-aircraft missiles were developed as part of Project Nike. The latest in the series, Nike-Zeus, offered extremely long-range interception and very high performance. In the late 1950s, the program investigated the use of Nike-Zeus missiles as interceptors against Soviet ICBMs. A Nike warhead would be detonated at high altitudes (over 100 km, or 60 statute miles) above the polar regions in the near vicinity of an incoming Soviet missile.

The problem of how to quickly identify and track incoming missiles proved intractable, especially in light of easily envisioned countermeasures such as decoys and chaff. At the same time, the need for a high-performance anti-aircraft weapon was also seriously eroded by the obvious evolution of the Soviet nuclear force to one based almost entirely on ICBMs. The Nike-Zeus project was canceled in 1961.

=== Project Defender ===
The Nike-Zeus use of nuclear warheads was necessary given the available missile technology. However, it had significant technical limitations such as blinding defensive radars to subsequent missiles. Also, exploding nuclear warheads over friendly territory (albeit in space) was not ideal. In the 1960s Project Defender and the Ballistic Missile Boost Intercept (BAMBI) concept replaced land-launched Nike missiles with missiles to be launched from satellite platforms orbiting directly above the USSR. Instead of nuclear warheads, the BAMBI missiles would deploy huge wire meshes designed to disable Soviet ICBMs in their early launch phase (the "boost phase"). No solution to the problem of how to protect the proposed satellite platforms against attack was found, however, and the program was canceled in 1968.

=== Sentinel Program ===
In 1967, U.S. Defense Secretary Robert McNamara announced the Sentinel Program, providing a defense against attack for most of the continental United States. The system consisted of a long range Spartan missile, the short range Sprint missile, and associated radar and computer system. However, U.S. military and political strategists recognized several problems with the system:

- Deployment of even a limited defensive ABM system might invite a preemptive nuclear attack before it could be implemented
- Deploying ABM systems would likely invite another expensive arms race for defensive systems, in addition to maintaining existing offensive expenditures
- Then-current technology did not permit a thorough defense against a sophisticated attack
- Defended coverage area was very limited due to the short range of the missiles used
- Use of nuclear warheads on antimissile interceptors would degrade capability of defensive radar, thus possibly rendering defense ineffective after the first few interceptions
- Political and public concern about detonating defensive nuclear warheads over friendly territory
- An ICBM defense could jeopardize the Mutual Assured Destruction concept, thus being a destabilizing influence

=== Safeguard Program ===
The Institute of Heraldry approved the shoulder sleeve insignia for Safeguard.

In 1969 Sentinel was renamed 'Safeguard'. It was from then on dedicated to the protection of some of the U.S. ICBM-silo areas from attack, promoting their ability to mount a retaliatory missile attack. Safeguard used the same Spartan and Sprint missiles, and the same radar technology as Sentinel. Safeguard solved some problems of Sentinel:

- It was less expensive to develop due to its limited geographic coverage and fewer required missiles.
- It avoided a lot of hazards to the public of defensive nuclear warheads detonated in the atmosphere nearby, since the Safeguard system was located in and near sparsely populated areas of the Dakotas, Montana, Manitoba, Saskatchewan, and Alberta.
- It provided better interception probabilities due to dense coverage by the shorter-range Sprint missiles, which were unable to cover the entire defended area under the larger and earlier proposed Sentinel program.

However Safeguard still retained several of the previously listed political and military problems.

=== ABM treaty ===
These above issues drove the United States and the USSR to sign the Anti-Ballistic Missile Treaty of 1972. Under the ABM treaty and the 1974 revision of it, each country was allowed to deploy only two ABM systems with only 100 interceptors each - one to protect the national command authority or capitol, the other to protect a deterrent force such as a missile field. The Soviets deployed a system named the A-35 "Galosh" missile system, and it was deployed to protect Moscow, its capital city. The U.S. deployed the Safeguard system to defend the ICBM launch sites around the Grand Forks Air Force Base, North Dakota, in 1975. The American Safeguard system was only briefly operational (for a matter of several months). The Soviet system (now called A-135) has been improved over the decades, and it is still operational around Moscow.

=== Homing Overlay Experiment ===
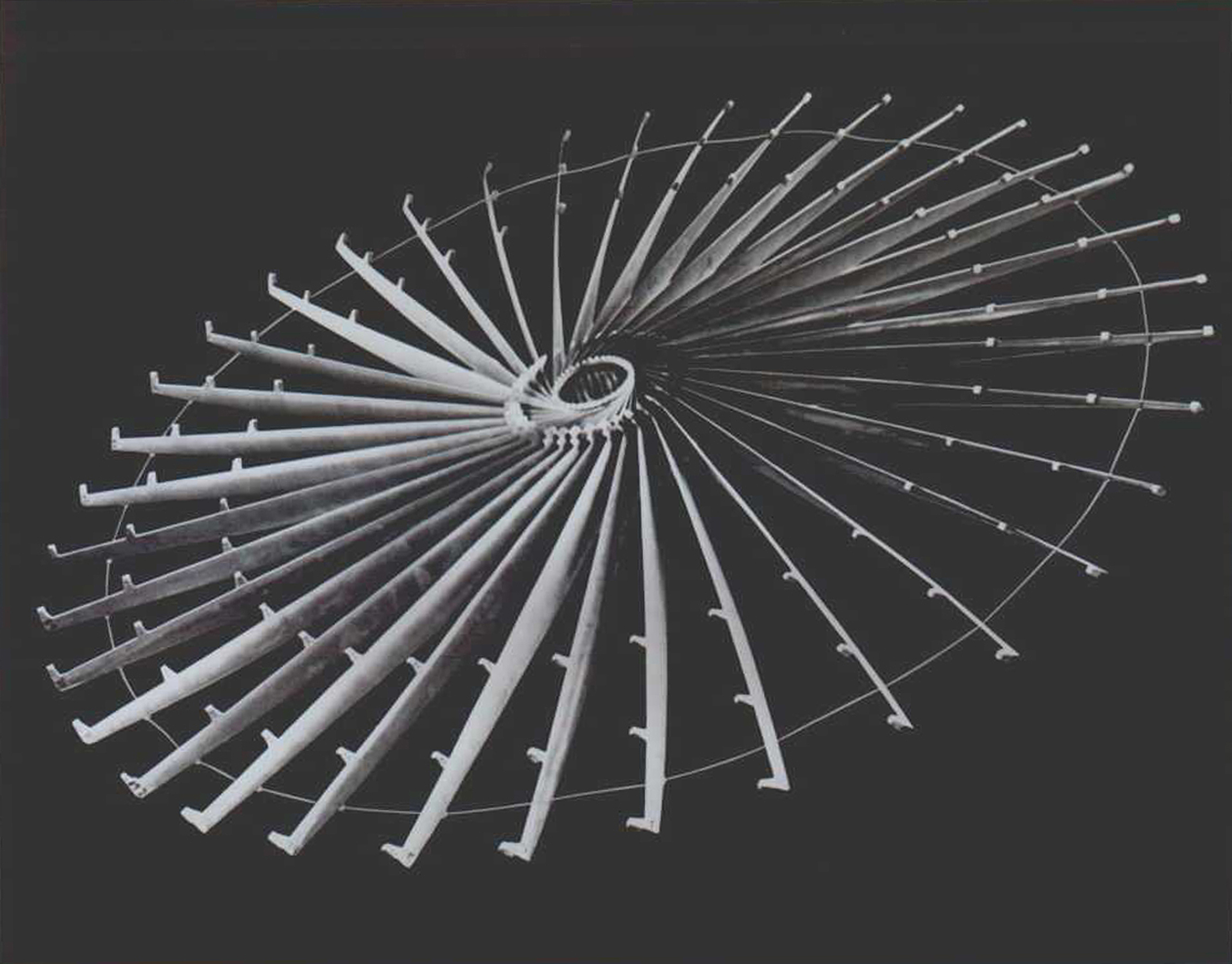
Homing Overlay Experiment open web

Given concerns about the previous programs using nuclear armed interceptors, in the 1980s the U.S. Army began studies about the feasibility of hit-to-kill vehicles, where an interceptor missile would destroy an incoming ballistic missile just by colliding with it, the so-called "Kinetic Kill Vehicles", or KKV.

The first program which actually tested a hit-to-kill missile interceptor was the Army's Homing Overlay Experiment. "Overlay" was the Army's term for exo-atmospheric interceptions, which would have to declutter any decoys, "underlay" was their term for high-altitude interceptions within the atmosphere. The KKV was equipped with an infrared seeker, guidance electronics and a propulsion system. Once in space, the KKV extended a 4 m (13 ft) diameter structure similar to an umbrella skeleton to enhance its effective cross section. This device would destroy the ICBM reentry vehicle on collision. After test failures with the first three flight tests, the fourth and final test on 10 June 1984 was successful, intercepting the Minuteman RV with a closing speed of about 6.1 km/s (3.8 mi/s) at an altitude of more than 160 km (99 mi).

=== Strategic Defense Initiative ===
SDI insignia

On 23 March 1983, President Ronald Reagan announced a new national missile defense program formally called the Strategic Defense Initiative but soon nicknamed "Star Wars" by detractors. President Reagan's stated goal was not just to protect the U.S. and its allies, but to also provide the completed system to the USSR, thus ending the threat of nuclear war for all parties. SDI was technically very ambitious and economically very expensive. It would have included many space-based laser battle stations and nuclear-pumped X-ray laser satellites designed to intercept hostile ICBMs in space, along with very sophisticated command and control systems. Unlike the previous Sentinel program, the goal was to totally defend against a robust, all out nuclear attack by the USSR.

A partisan debate ensued in Congress, with Democrats questioning the feasibility and strategic wisdom of such a program, while Republicans talked about its strategic necessity and provided a number of technical experts who argued that it was in fact feasible (including Manhattan Project physicist Edward Teller). Advocates of SDI prevailed and funding was initiated in fiscal year 1984.

=== Withdrawal from ABM Treaty ===
In December 1999, the United Nations General Assembly approved a resolution aimed at pressing the United States to abandon its plans to build an anti-missile missile defense system. Voting against the draft, along with the United States, were three other countries, Albania, Israel, and the Federated States of Micronesia. Thirteen of the 15 members of the European Union abstained, and France and Ireland voted in favor of this resolution. The resolution called for continued efforts to strengthen and preserve the treaty. On 14 June 2002, the United States withdrew from the ABM Treaty. On the following day, Russia responded by withdrawing from START II treaty (intended to ban MIRV ICBMs).

== Current NMD program ==
=== Goals ===
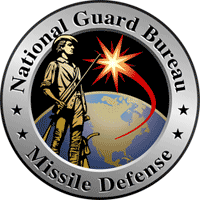
The logo of the Missile Defense division of the U.S. National Guard, part of the modern American missile defense system

In the 1990s and early 21st century, the stated mission of NMD has changed to the more modest goal of preventing the United States from being subject to nuclear blackmail or nuclear terrorism by a so-called rogue state. The feasibility of this more limited goal remains somewhat controversial. Under President Bill Clinton some testing continued, but the project received little funding despite Clinton's supportive remarks on 5 September 2000 that "such a system, if it worked properly, could give us an extra dimension of insurance in a world where proliferation has complicated the task of preserving peace."

The system is administered by the Missile Defense Agency (MDA). There are several other agencies and military commands which play a role, such as the United States Army Space and Missile Defense Command and Space Delta 4.

MDA and the Space Development Agency (SDA) are currently developing elements of a hypersonic missile defense system to defend against hypersonic weapons; these elements include the tracking and transport layers of the National Defense Space Architecture (NDSA) and various interceptor programs, although the maneuverability and low flight altitudes of hypersonic weapons are expected to pose challenges. MDA's Glide Phase Interceptor (GPI) is expected to be able to defend against hypersonic missiles by the mid- to late-2020s. DARPA's Glide Breaker program seeks to equip a vehicle to precisely target hypersonic missiles at long range. Analysts continue to debate the feasibility, effectiveness, and practicality of hypersonic weapons defense.

=== Components ===
The current NMD system consists of several components.

==== Glide phase interceptors (GPIs) ====
Glide phase interceptors (GPIs) are missiles designed to intercept hypersonic vehicles in flight.

==== Ground-based interceptor missiles ====
One major component is Ground-Based Midcourse Defense (GMD), consisting of ground-based interceptor (GBI) missiles and radar in the United States in Alaska, which would intercept incoming warheads in space. Currently some GBI missiles are located at Vandenberg SFB[Space Force Base] in California. These GBIs can be augmented by mid-course SM-3 interceptors fired from Navy ships. About ten interceptor missiles were operational as of 2006. In 2014, the Missile Defense Agency had 30 operational GBIs, with 14 additional ground-based interceptors requested for 2017 deployment, in the Fiscal Year 2016 budget.

Officially, the final deployment goal is the "C3" phase, intended to counter tens of complex warheads from two GMD locations utilizing 200 ABMs "or more". The system design permits further expansion and upgrades beyond the C3 level.

==== Aegis Ballistic Missile Defense System ====
A major component is a ship-based system called the Aegis Ballistic Missile Defense System. This was given major new importance by President Obama in September 2009, when he announced plans to scrap the plans for a missile defense site in Poland, in favor of missile defense systems located on US Navy warships. On 18 September 2009, Russian Prime Minister Putin welcomed Obama's plans for missile defense scrapping sites at Russia's doorstep.

In 2009, several US Navy ships were fitted with SM-3 missiles to serve this function, complementing the Patriot systems already deployed by American units. Also, warships of Japan and Australia have been given weapons and technology to enable them to participate in the American defense plan as well.

On 12 November 2009, the Missile Defense Agency announced that six additional US Navy destroyers would be upgraded to participate in the program. In fiscal 2012, USS Carney (DDG-64), USS Ross (DDG-71), and USS Donald Cook (DDG-75) were upgraded. USS Cole (DDG-67), USS McFaul (DDG-74) and USS Porter (DDG-78) were to be upgraded in fiscal 2013. The goal of the program was to have 21 ships upgraded by the end of 2010; 24 in 2012; and 27 around 2013.

All ships equipped with the Aegis combat system possess the SM-2 surface-to-air missile which, through recent upgrades, has terminal stage ballistic missile defense capabilities.

==== Terminal High-Altitude Area Defense ====
Terminal High Altitude Area Defense (THAAD) is a program of the US Army, utilizing ground-based interceptor missiles which can intercept missiles in the upper part of the atmosphere and outside the atmosphere. THAAD has been deployed in Guam, the United Arab Emirates, South Korea and most recently Israel.

==== Airborne systems ====
Several airborne systems are being examined, which would then be utilized by the US Air Force. One major object of study is a boost-phase defense, meaning a system to intercept missiles while they are in their boost phase. One potential system for this use would be an airborne laser, which was tested on the Boeing YAL-1 and was later cancelled. Other ideas are also being studied.

As of 2009, the only anti-ballistic missile defense system with a boost-phase capability is the Aegis Ballistic Missile Defense System. There are several benefits to a sea-based boost-phase system, as it is fully mobile and has greater security by operating in international waters.

==== Shorter-range anti-ballistic missiles ====
Three shorter range tactical anti-ballistic missile systems are currently operational: the U.S. Army Patriot, U.S. Navy Aegis combat system/SM-2 missile, and the Israeli Arrow missile. In general short-range tactical ABMs cannot intercept ICBMs, even if within range (Arrow-3 can intercept ICBMs). The tactical ABM radar and performance characteristics do not allow it, as an incoming ICBM warhead moves much faster than a tactical missile warhead. However, the better-performance Terminal High Altitude Area Defense missile could be upgraded to intercept ICBMs. The SM-3 missile has some capability against ICBMs, as demonstrated by the November 2020 successful interception of an ICBM-class target missile.

Latest versions of the U.S. Hawk missile have a limited capability against tactical ballistic missiles, but is not usually described as an ABM. Similar claims have been made about the Russian long-range surface-to-air S-300 and S-400 series.

==== Multilateral and international participation ====
Several aspects of the defense program have either sought or achieved participation and assistance from other nations. Several foreign navies are participating in the Aegis Ballistic Missile Defense, including Japan and Australia. Also, the United States has considered establishing radar sites and missile sites in other nations as part of the Ground-Based Midcourse Defense. A missile defense site in Poland received much media attention when it was cancelled in favor of the Aegis BMD. A radar site in the United Kingdom is being upgraded, and another one is being built in Greenland. Other countries have contributed technological developments and various locations.

Taiwan has indicated that it is willing to host national missile defense radars to be tied into the American system, but is unwilling to pay for any further cost overruns in the systems.

The Wall Street Journal reported on 17 July 2012, that the Pentagon is building a missile-defense radar station at a secret site in Qatar. The Wall Street Journal report was later confirmed by an article in The New York Times from 8 August 2012, which stated that U.S. officials disclosed that a high-resolution, X-band missile defense radar would be located in Qatar. The radar site in Qatar will complete the backbone of a system designed to defend U.S. interests and allies such as Israel and European nations against Iranian rockets, officials told The Wall Street Journal. The Pentagon chose to place the new radar site in Qatar because it is home to the largest U.S. military air base in the region, Al Udeid Air Base, analysts said. The radar base in Qatar is slated to house a powerful AN/TPY-2 radar, also known as an X-Band radar, and supplement two similar arrays already in place in Israel's Negev Desert and in central Turkey, officials said. Together, the three radar sites form an arc that U.S. officials say can detect missile launches from northern, western and southern Iran. Those sites will enable U.S. officials and allied militaries to track missiles launched from deep inside Iran, which has an arsenal of missiles capable of reaching Israel and parts of Europe. The radar installations, in turn, are being linked to missile-interceptor batteries throughout the region and to U.S. ships with high-altitude interceptor rockets. The X-Band radar provides images that can be used to pinpoint rockets in flight.

U.S. official also stated that the U.S. military's Central Command, which is overseeing the buildup to counter Iran, also wants to deploy the Army's first Terminal High Altitude Area Defense missile-interceptor system, known as THAAD, to the region in the coming months. The THAAD has its own radar, so deploying it separately from the X-Bands provides even more coverage and increases the system's accuracy, officials said. The X-Band radar and the THAAD will provide an "extra layer of defense," supplementing Patriot batteries that are used to counter lower-altitude rockets, said Riki Ellison, chairman of the Missile Defense Advocacy Alliance.

On 23 August 2012, The Wall Street Journal reported that the U.S. is planning a major expansion of missile defenses in Asia. According to American officials this move is designed to contain threats from North Korea, but one that could also be used to counter China's military. The planned buildup is part of a defensive array that could cover large swaths of Asia, with a new radar in southern Japan and possibly another in Southeast Asia tied to missile-defense ships and land-based interceptors.

US Defence officials told The Wall Street Journal that the core of the new anti-missile shield would be a powerful early-warning radar, known as an X-Band, sited on a southern Japanese island. Discussions between Japan and the United States are currently underway. The new X-Band would join an existing radar that was installed in northern Japan in 2006 and a third X-Band could be placed in South East Asia. The resulting radar arc would cover North Korea, China and possibly even Taiwan. According to U.S. Navy officials and the Congressional Research Service the U.S. Navy has drawn up plans to expand its fleet of ballistic missile-defense-capable warships from 26 ships today to 36 by 2018. Officials said as many as 60% of those are likely to be deployed to Asia and the Pacific. In addition, the U.S. Army is considering acquiring additional Terminal High Altitude Area Defense, or THAAD, antimissile systems, said a senior defense official. Under current plans, the Army is building six THAADs.

In response to The Wall Street Journal, U.S. General Martin Dempsey, chairman of the Joint Chiefs of Staff, said on 23 August 2012 that the United States are in discussions with its close ally Japan about expanding a missile defense system in Asia by positioning an early warning radar in southern Japan. Dempsey however stated that no decisions have been reached on expanding the radar. The State Department said the U.S. is taking a phased approach to missile defense in Asia, as it is in Europe and the Middle East. "These are defensive systems. They don’t engage unless missiles have been fired," department spokeswoman Victoria Nuland told a news conference. "In the case of Asian systems, they are designed against a missile threat from North Korea. They are not directed at China." Nuland said the U.S. has broad discussions with China through military and political channels about the systems' intent.

In addition to one American X-band radar – officially known as the AN/TPY-2 – hosted by Japan the United States and Japan announced an agreement on 17 September 2012, to deploy a second, advanced missile-defense radar on Japanese territory. "The purpose of this is to enhance our ability to defend Japan," U.S. Secretary of Defense Leon Panetta said at a news conference. "It’s also designed to help forward-deployed U.S. forces, and it also will be effective in protecting the U.S. homeland from the North Korean ballistic missile threat." In addition to detecting ballistic missiles the radars also provide the U.S. military and its allies a highly detailed view of ship traffic in the region. That capability is particularly desired by U.S. allies in the region that are engaged in territorial disputes with China over contested islands and fishing grounds.

Some U.S. officials have noted that defenses built up against North Korean missiles would also be positioned to track a Chinese ballistic missile. A land-based radar would also free the Navy to reposition its ship-based radar to other regional hot-spots, officials said. A U.S. team landed in Japan in September 2012 to discuss where the second facility will be located, according to a U.S. defense official. Officials have said they want to locate the radar, formally known as AN/TPY2, in the southern part of Japan, but not on Okinawa, where the U.S. military presence is deeply controversial. During a joint news conference in Tokyo, Panetta and Japanese Defense Minister Satoshi Morimoto said a joint U.S.-Japanese team would begin searching immediately for a site for the new radar. On 15 November 2012, Australia and the United States announced that the US military will station a powerful radar and a space telescope in Australia as part of its strategic shift towards Asia. "It will give us visibility into things that are leaving the atmosphere, entering the atmosphere, really all throughout Asia", including China's rocket and missile tests, a US defence official told reporters on condition of anonymity.

== Program planning, goals, and discussions ==
The Missile Defense Agency logo.

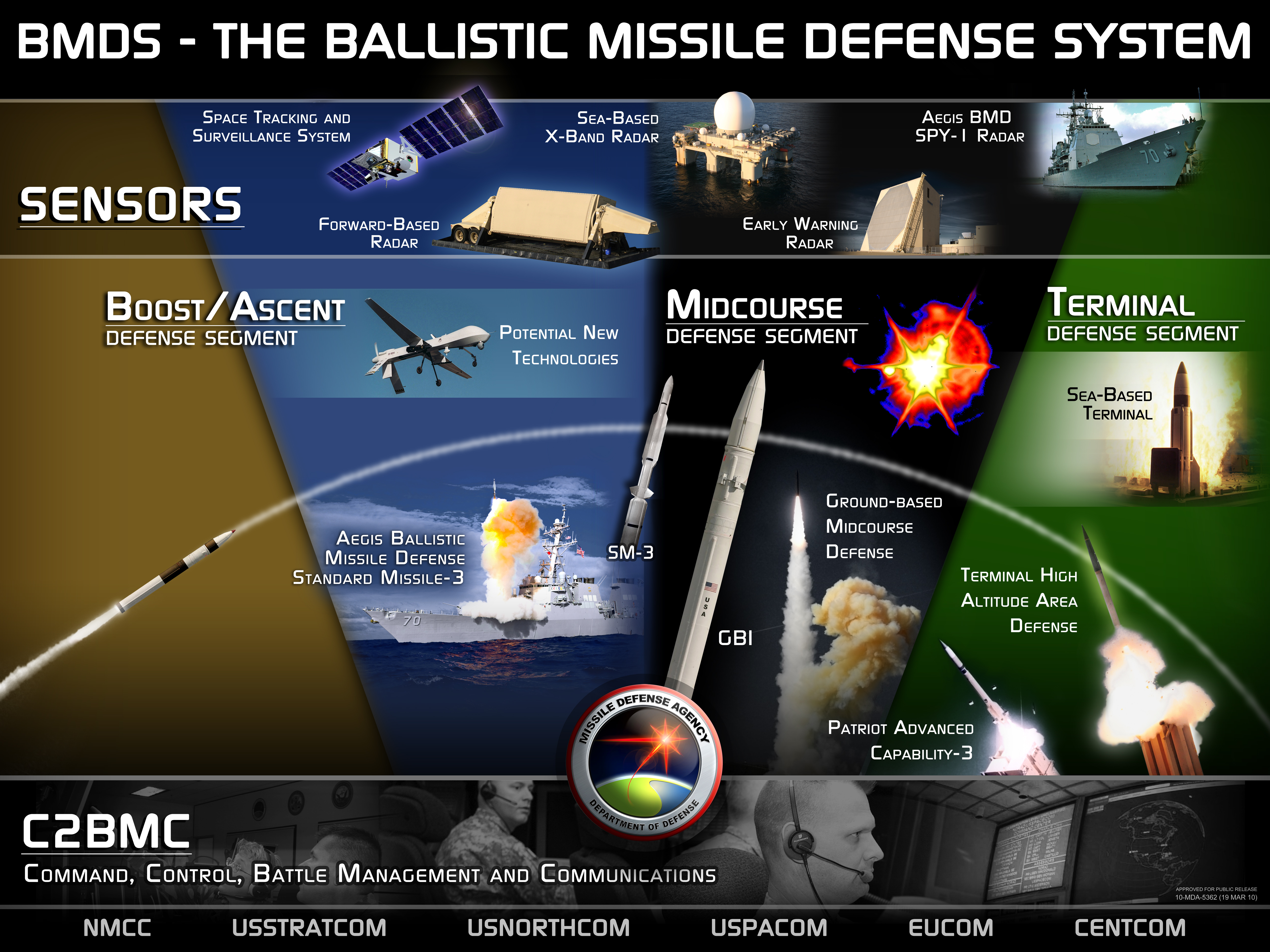
An infographic describing the Ballistic Missile Defense System (BMDS) created by the Missile Defense Agency in 2010.

On 14 October 2002, a ground based interceptor launched from the Ronald Reagan Ballistic Missile Defense Test Site destroyed a mock warhead 225 km above the Pacific. The test included three decoy balloons.

On 16 December 2002 President George W. Bush signed National Security Presidential Directive 23 which outlined a plan to begin deployment of operational ballistic missile defense systems by 2004. The following day the U.S. formally requested from the UK and Denmark use of facilities in Fylingdales, England, and Thule, Greenland, respectively, as a part of the NMD program. The projected cost of the program for the years 2004 to 2009 will be $53 billion, making it the largest single line in The Pentagon's budget.

Since 2002, the US has been in talks with Poland and other European countries over the possibility of setting up a European base to intercept long-range missiles. A site similar to the US base in Alaska would help protect the US and Europe from missiles fired from the Middle East or North Africa. Poland's prime minister Kazimierz Marcinkiewicz said in November 2005 he wanted to open up the public debate on whether Poland should host such a base.

In 2002, NMD was changed to Ground-Based Midcourse Defense (GMD), to differentiate it from other missile defense programs, such as space-based, sea-based, and defense targeting the boost phase and the reentry phase (see flight phases).

On 22 July 2004, the first ground-based interceptor was deployed at Fort Greely, Alaska (63.954°N 145.735°W). By the end of 2004, a total of six had been deployed at Ft. Greely and another two at Vandenberg Air Force Base, California. Two additional were installed at Ft. Greely in 2005. The system will provide "rudimentary" protection.

On 15 December 2004, an interceptor test in the Marshall Islands failed when the launch was aborted due to an "unknown anomaly" in the interceptor, 16 minutes after launch of the target from Kodiak Island, Alaska.

"I don't think that the goal was ever that we would declare it was operational. I think the goal was that there would be an operational capability by the end of 2004," Pentagon representative Larry DiRita said on 2005-01-13 at a Pentagon press conference. However, the problem is and was funding. "There has been some expectation that there will be some point at which it is operational and not something else these expectations are not unknown, if Congress pours more attention and funding to this system, it can be operational relatively quick."

On 18 January 2005, the Commander, United States Strategic Command issued direction to establish the Joint Functional Component Command for Integrated Missile Defense (JFCC IMD). The JFCC IMD, once activated, will develop desired characteristics and capabilities for global missile defense operations and support for missile defense.

On 14 February 2005, another interceptor test failed due to a malfunction with the ground support equipment at the test range on Kwajalein Island, not with the interceptor missile itself.

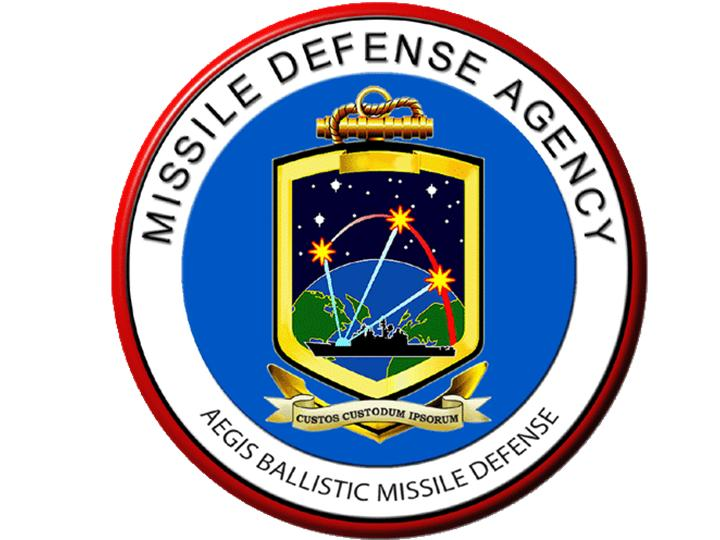
Aegis Ballistic Missile Defense System logo

On 24 February 2005, the Missile Defense Agency, testing the Aegis Ballistic Missile Defense System, successfully intercepted a mock enemy missile. This was the first test of an operationally configured RIM-161 Standard missile 3 (SM-3) interceptor and the fifth successful test intercept using this system. On 10 November 2005, the USS Lake Erie detected, tracked, and destroyed a mock two-stage ballistic missile within two minutes of the ballistic missile launch.

On 1 September 2006, the Ground-Based Midcourse Defense System was successfully tested. An interceptor was launched from Vandenberg Air Force Base to hit a target missile launched from Alaska, with ground support provided by a crew at Colorado Springs. This test was described by Missile Defense Agency director Lieutenant General Trey Obering as "about as close as we can come to an end-to-end test of our long-range missile defense system." The target missile carried no decoys or other countermeasures.

Deployment of the Sea-based X-band Radar system is presently underway.

On 24 February 2007, The Economist reported that the United States ambassador to NATO, Victoria Nuland, had written to her fellow envoys to advise them regarding the various options for missile-defense sites in Europe. She also confirmed that "The United States has also been discussing with the UK further potential contributions to the system."

On 23 February 2008, the United States successfully shot down a malfunctioning American spy satellite.

The Ustka-Wicko base (54.553748°N 16.620255°E) of the Polish Army was mentioned as a possible site of US missile interceptors. Russia objected; its suspension of the Treaty on Conventional Armed Forces in Europe may be related.

Russia threatened to place short-range nuclear missiles on the Russia's border with NATO if the United States refused to abandon plans to deploy 10 interceptor missiles and a radar in Poland and the Czech Republic. In April 2007, Putin warned of a new Cold War if the Americans deployed the shield in Central Europe. Putin also said that Russia is prepared to abandon its obligations under a Nuclear Forces Treaty of 1987 with the United States. In 2014 Russia announced plans to install more radar and missile defense systems across the country to counter U.S. plans for a missile defense system in Eastern Europe.

As of January 2017, the top 3 candidate sites for a proposed Eastern United States missile defense site are now New York, Michigan, and Ohio.

=== Missile defense sites in Central Europe ===
Previously, a controversial initiative existed for placing GMD missile defense installations in Central Europe, namely in Poland and Czech Republic. As a result of strong Russian opposition, the plan has been abandoned in favor of Aegis-class missile defense based in the Black Sea and eventually in Romania.

In February 2007, the US started formal negotiations with Poland and Czech Republic concerning placement of a site of Ground-Based Midcourse Defense System. The announced objective was to protect most of Europe from long-range missile strikes from Iran. Public opinion in both countries opposed: 57% of Poles disagreed, while 21% supported the plans; in Czech Republic it was 67% versus 15%. More than 130,000 Czechs signed a petition for a referendum about the base, which is by far the largest citizen initiative (Ne základnám – No to Bases) since the Velvet Revolution.

The Ustka-Wicko base of the Polish Army was mentioned as a possible site of 10 American interceptor missiles. Russia objected; its suspension of the Treaty on Conventional Armed Forces in Europe may be related. Putin warned of a possible new Cold War. Russia threatened to place short-range nuclear missiles on its border with NATO if the United States refused to abandon the plan.

A radar and tracking system site placement was agreed with the Czech Republic. After long negotiations, on 20 August 2008, US Secretary of State Condoleezza Rice and Poland's Foreign Minister Radoslaw Sikorski signed in Warsaw the "Agreement Between the Government of the United States of America and the Government of the Republic of Poland Concerning the Deployment of Ground-Based Ballistic Missile Defense Interceptors in the Territory of the Republic of Poland", a deal that would implement the missile defense system in Polish territory. Russia warned Poland that it is exposing itself to attack—even a nuclear one—by accepting U.S. missile interceptors on its soil. Gen. Anatoly Nogovitsyn the deputy chief of staff of Russia's armed forces said "Poland, by deploying (the system) is exposing itself to a strike – 100 percent".

In September 2009, President Barack Obama announced that plans for missile defense sites in Central Europe would be scrapped in favor of systems located on US Navy warships. On 18 September 2009, Russian Prime Minister Putin decided to welcome Obama's plans for stationing American Aegis defense warships in the Black Sea. The deployment occurred the same month, consisting of warships equipped with the Aegis RIM-161 SM-3 missile system, which complements the Patriot missile systems already deployed by American units. Once USS Monterey was actually deployed to the Black Sea the Russian Foreign Ministry issued a statement voicing concern about the deployment.

On 4 February 2010, Romania agreed to host the SM-3 missiles starting in 2015. The missile defense system in Deveselu became operational on 18 December 2015. The BMD component in Romania underwent an upgrade in 2019; in the interim a THAAD unit, B Battery (THAAD), 62nd Air Defense Artillery Regiment, was emplaced in NSF Deveselu, Romania. Aegis Ashore was installed in Redzikowo, Poland with completion by 2022.

== Skepticism ==
There has been controversy among experts about whether it is technically feasible to build an effective missile defense system and, in particular, whether the GMD would work.

An April 2000 study by the Union of Concerned Scientists and the Security Studies Program at the Massachusetts Institute of Technology concluded that "[a]ny country capable of deploying a long-range missile would also be able to deploy countermeasures that would defeat the planned NMD system." Countermeasures studied in detail were bomblets containing biological or chemical agents, aluminized balloons to serve as decoys and to disguise warheads, and cooling warheads to reduce the kill vehicle's ability to detect them.

In April 2004, a General Accounting Office report concluded that "MDA does not explain some critical assumptions—such as an enemy’s type and number of decoys—underlying its performance goals." It recommended that "DOD carry out independent, operationally realistic testing of each block being fielded" but DOD responded that "formal operational testing is not required before entry into full-rate production."

Proponents did not suggest how to discriminate between empty and warhead-enclosing balloons, for instance, but said that these "simple" countermeasures are actually hard to implement, and that defense technology is rapidly advancing to defeat them. The Missile Defense Agency (MDA) said decoy discrimination techniques were classified, and emphasized its intention to provide future boost and terminal defense to diminish the importance of midcourse decoys. In summer 2002 MDA ceased providing detailed intercept information and declined to answer technical questions about decoys on grounds of national security.

China is developing a hypersonic glide vehicle (HGV), now called the DF-ZF, capable of penetrating US missile defenses. The US Department of Defense denotes this HGV as the WU-14. In response the US Army is participating in a joint program with the US Navy and US Air Force, to develop a hypersonic glide body in 2019, with test fires every six months, beginning in 2021.

== Boost-phase defense ==
Boost-phase defense is the act of engaging a missile as it begins to launch, which is substantially easier due to the fact that in that moment, any ballistic missile has not deployed penetration aids. This is differentiated from ascent-phase defense, where the missile has gained substantial speed and altitude.

In theory, this may be accomplished with any weapons system capable of airborne intercept, however in practice area defense surface to air missiles are highly desirable, as the window of opportunity is very short. For example, the American Standard Missile 2 has an effective range in excess of 70km, however according to an American Physical Society study, it must be within 40 kilometers of the launching point. This is acceptable for submarine-launched ballistic missiles (SLBMs), but not likely for land-based intercontinental ballistic missiles (ICBMs).

=== Boost-phase defense against solid-fueled ICBM ===
Boost-phase defense is significantly more difficult against the current solid-fuel rocket ICBMs, because their boost phase is shorter. Current solid-fueled ICBMs include Russian Topol, Indian Agni-V, and Chinese DF-31 and DF-41, along with the US Minuteman and Trident.

There is no theoretical perspective for economically viable boost-phase defense against the latest solid-fueled ICBMs, no matter if it would be ground-based missiles, space-based missiles, or airborne laser (ABL).

=== Boost-phase defense against older ICBMs ===
A ground-based boost-phase defense might be possible, if the goals were somewhat limited: to counter older liquid-fuel propelled ICBMs, and to counter simple solid-propellant missiles launched from less challenging locations (such as North Korea).

Using orbital launchers to provide a reliable boost-phase defense against liquid-fueled ICBMs is not likely, as it was found to require at least 700 large interceptors in orbit. Using two or more interceptors per target, or countering solid fueled missiles, would require many more orbital launchers. The old Brilliant Pebbles project—although it did not apply to the boost phase—estimated the number at 4,000 smaller orbital launchers.

The airborne laser (ABL) is possibly capable of intercepting a liquid fuel missile if within 600 km from a launch point.

== See also ==
- Essentials of Post–Cold War Deterrence
- Deterrence theory
- Militarisation of space
- Missile defense systems by country
- Nuclear warfare
- Nuclear weapon
- Civil defense
- X-band radar
- Joint Functional Component Command for Integrated Missile Defense
- Strategic Defense Initiative, also known as SDI or "Star Wars" missile defense
