= Dunay radar =

Soviet missile defence radar

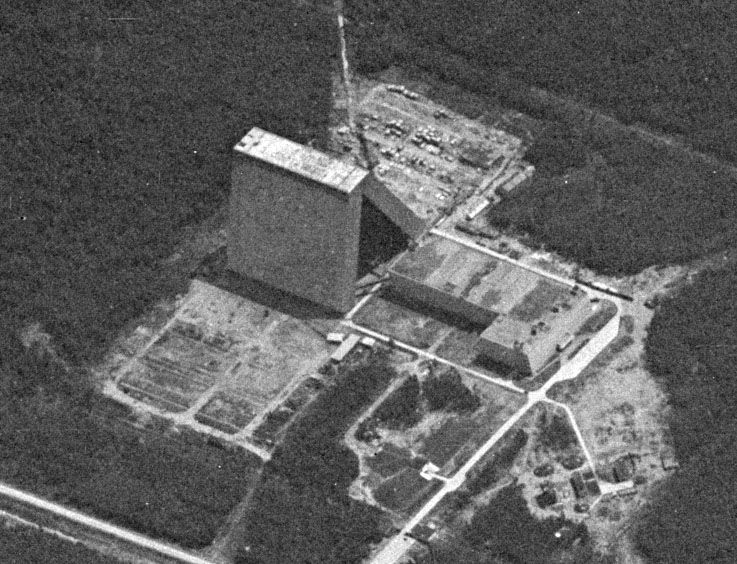
- Dunay-3 (NATO: Dog House) radar receiver taken by US KH-7 spy satellite in 1967
- Country of origin: Soviet Union
- Introduced: 1959 (Dunay-2); 1968 (Dunay-3); 1978 (Dunay-3M, Dunay-3U)
- No. built: 3
- Type: early warning radar
- Frequency: UHF
- Range: 1,200 km (Dunay-2); 2,500 km (Dunay-3M)
- Power: 100 kW (Dunay-2); 3 MW per sector (Dunay-3M)
- Other names: NATO: Dog House, Cat House, Top Roost, Hen Roost

Dunay radar (Russian: Дунай, romanized: Dunay literally Danube; NATO: Cat House, Dog House) was a system of two Soviet radars used to detect American ballistic missiles fired at Moscow. They were part of the A-35 anti-ballistic missile system. One sector of one of the radars, the Dunay-3U ("Cat House") is still operational and is run by the Russian Space Forces as part of the Main Control Centre of Outer Space.

== Dunay-2 ==
The Dunay-2 was a prototype built in Sary Shagan as part of the experimental missile defence system "A". It consisted of separate transmitter and receiver complexes separated by 1 kilometre (0.62 mi). The power of the radar was 100 kW and its range was 1,200 kilometres (750 mi). The NATO codename was "Hen Roost".

== Dunay-3M ==
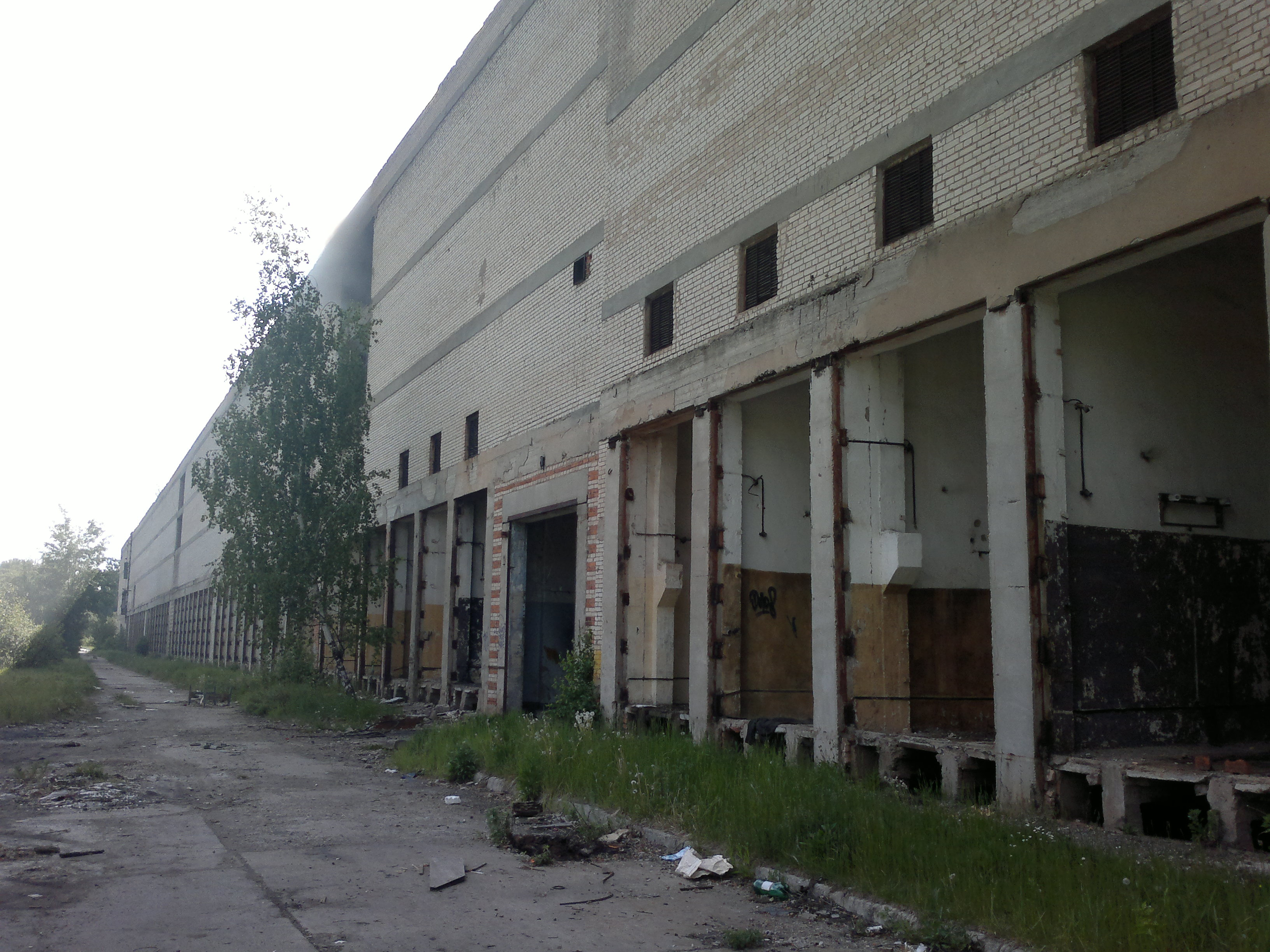
Ruins of the Dunay-3M

The Dunay-3 (Russian: Дунай-3М, romanized: Dunay-3M; NATO: Dog House) was an upgrade of the Dunay-2 located in Kubinka, Moscow and became operational in 1968. Following an extensive upgrade in 1978 it was renamed Dunay-3M as part of the upgraded A-35M ABM system. It consisted of separate receiver and transmitter buildings separated by 2.5 kilometres (1.6 mi).

The transmitter covered two sectors (roughly north and south) and its array was 200 metres (660 ft) long and 30 metres (98 ft) high. The power of each sector was about 3 MW. The receiver was a building 100 m×100 m containing 2 passive electronically scanned array radars as well as the command and control centre for the A-35 system. The range of the system was 2,500 kilometres (1,600 mi).

The radar was functional until it caught fire on 8 May 1988.

== Dunay-3UP ==
This was a prototype of the Dunay-3U and was located in Sary Shagan test site. It was given the NATO codename "Top Roost".

== Dunay-3U ==
The Dunay-3U (Russian: Дунай-3У, romanized: Dunay-3U; NATO: Cat House) was built in 1978 as part of the upgraded A-35M anti-ballistic missile system. It is located in Chekhov and was structurally similar to the Dunay-3M – it has a separate receiver and transmitter separated by 2.7 kilometres (1.7 mi). There are two sectors. It was capable of identifying the launch of Pershing II missiles from West Germany.

In 1995 A-35M was replaced by the A-135 anti-ballistic missile system which used the Don-2N radar. One sector of the radar was decommissioned and is now abandoned while the other is used for surveillance of satellites in low Earth orbit. As a UHF radar it can identify smaller objects (15–40 cm) than the VHF radars such as the Daryal and Dnepr.

The Dunay-3U was commissioned in May 1978 with a lifespan of 12 years, later being extended by ten more. Sector 62 of the radar was nonetheless decommissioned in 1998 while sector 61 had its service life extended again in 2001 and 2005 – the last extension lasting until December 2009, but it may have been extended again since. In 2012 the Russian Ministry of Defense issued a tender for the demolition of sector 62.

Before 2003 the transmitter had 30 waveguides each excited by a 100 kW transmitter. Since 2003 the station has been operating at a reduced power of 500 kW rather than 1800 kW, with 12 transmitters (out of 24) rather than the previous maximum of 30. The radar is chirped.

The radar's computer system is made up of 10 K340 computers.

== Locations ==
Location	Coordinates	Type	Built	Details
Kubinka, Russia	55°28′48″N 36°38′54″E transmitter 55°29′31″N 36°40′49″E receiver	Dunay-3M ("Dog House")	1968	Azimuth 150° and 330°
Chekhov, Russia	55°12′24″N 37°17′41″E transmitter 55°13′52″N 37°17′49″E	Dunay-3U ("Cat House")	1978	Azimuth 280° and 100°
Sary Shagan, Kazakhstan	45°56′10″N 73°37′43″E transmitter 45°56′50″N 73°37′52″E receiver	Dunay-2 ("Hen Roost"); Dunay-3UP ("Top Roost")	1957–1964; 1968–1973	Prototypes

Location of Dunay radar within Moscow region
