= A-35 anti-ballistic missile system =

Soviet missile defence system

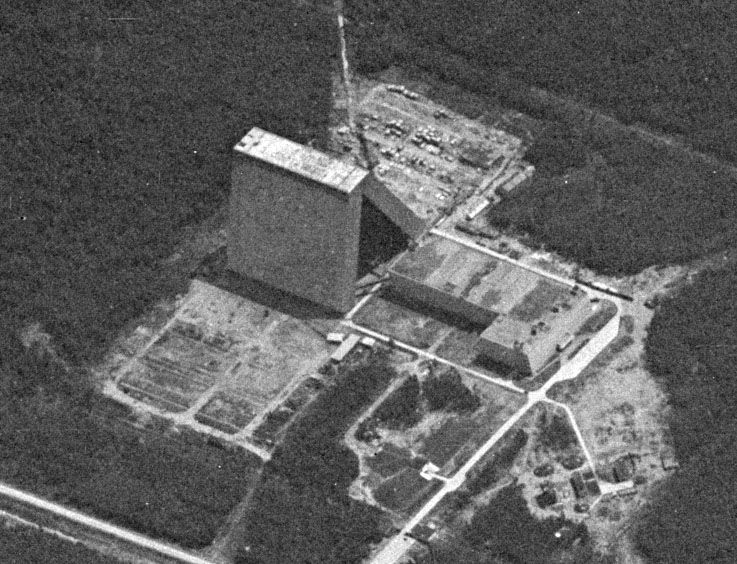
Dunay-3 (NATO: Dog House) radar receiver photographed by the US KH-7 spy satellite in 1967

The A-35 anti-ballistic missile system was a Soviet military anti-ballistic missile (ABM) system deployed around Moscow to intercept enemy ballistic missiles targeting the city or its surrounding areas. The A-35 was the only Soviet ABM system allowed under the 1972 Anti-Ballistic Missile Treaty. In development as of the 1960s and in operation from June 1972 until the 1990s, it featured the nuclear-armed A350 exoatmospheric interceptor missile. The A-35 was supported by two Dunay radars (NATO reporting names: Cat House and Dog House) and the Soviet early warning system. It was followed by the A-135 in the early 1990s.

== System A ==
The first Soviet anti-ballistic missile system was System A, which began development at Sary Shagan's Test Range A in July 1956, followed by testing starting in 1959. System A used the V-1000 missile to intercept enemy missiles. First launch of the V-1000 took place on 11 October 1957; its first successful intercept occurred on 4 March 1961, when it intercepted an R-12 missile launched from the Kapustin Yar site.

System A used the Dunay-2 radar designed by V Sosulnikov at NII-37 (which later became NIIDAR), in addition to three homing radars and an RSV-PR ABM radar (NATO: Hen Nest). The three homing radars (called RTN; NATO name Hen Egg)) were situated in an equilateral triangle with a length of 150 kilometres (93 mi). The system could track missiles from a distance of about 700 kilometres (430 mi). The V-1000 launcher and the ABM radar were located together. The system used an M-40 computer which could perform 40,000 operations per second.

== A-35 ==
A-35 anti-ballistic missile system in Moscow Oblast. The black missiles depicted constructed A-350 missile sites, unfilled missiles were planned sites, and the dishes were the two Dunay radars. Locations from O'Connor (2012).

Work on the A-35 system first started in 1959 with a test model called Aldan. The system's designer was Gregory Kisunko of Soviet Experimental Design Bureau OKB-30. A new missile, called the A-350, was to be designed by P. Grushin of OKB-2. Unlike the V-1000, the missile was to have a nuclear warhead. The design of the system called for it to be able to intercept several hostile incoming missiles simultaneously with a single warhead. It was also to intercept them outside the atmosphere. The A-35 was to have a main command centre, eight early warning radars with overlapping sectors, and 32 battle stations.

Installation work on the A-35 began in 1965, but by 1967 only the test version at Sary Shagan was ready. Awareness of the system's flaws, including its inability to handle MIRVs, was part of the reason a 1967 Ministry of Defence commission decided against fully implementing the A-35. Its eight radars were reduced to the two on which construction had already started: Dunay-3 at Akulovo (Kubinka), also known by the NATO reporting name Dog House, and Dunay-3U at Chekhov (NATO name Cat House).

In 1971, a version of the A-35 was tested with the main command centre, one radar and three battle stations. The command centre was located at the same site as the Dunay-3 radar. In 1974, a version was tested with the main command (equipped with a 5E92 computer) and four of the eight battle stations. Each battle station had two tracking radars, two battle management radars and sixteen A-350 missiles.

Only four of the eight battle stations were ever completed. Each battle station had two areas with eight missiles each. Each area had three radars, which were called TRY ADD by NATO.

== A-35M ==
Testing of the A35-M system began in 1977. It was a slightly modified version, using A-350R instead of A-350Zh missiles.

In 1971, work started on the next generation of ABM systems: the A135. Building of the Don-2N radar started in 1978, and the replacement system was placed on combat duty in 1995.

A 1985 note from the archives of Vitalii Kataev states that the A-35M system was capable of intercepting "a single ballistic missile from some directions and up to 6 Pershing II-type missiles from the FRG".
