= Natalja Vladimirovna Malisjeva =

Russian astronautical engineer and nun (1921–2012)

- Ната́лья Влади́мировна Ма́лышева
- Born: December 12, 1921; Feodosia, Crimea, RSFSR
- Died: February 4, 2012 (aged 90)
- Other name: Mother Adriana
- Education: Moscow Aviation Institute
- Occupations: astronautical engineer, officer, nun
- Awards: Order of the Patriotic War (2nd class) Order of the Badge of Honour Medal "For the Defence of Stalingrad" Medal "For the Victory over Germany in the Great Patriotic War 1941–1945"
- Scientific career
- Fields: Aerospace engineering
- Workplaces: TsNIIMash

Natalya Vladimirovna Malisjeva (December 12, 1921, Feodosia – February 4, 2012) was a participant of the Great Patriotic War, a Soviet rocket engine designer, and later a nun under the name Adriana.

== Biography ==
Natalya Vladimirovna Malisjeva was born in Crimea to a zemstvo doctor’s family. From a young age, she practiced swimming, gymnastics, skiing, and shooting. She completed nurse training and passed the GTO fitness standards. After high school, Malysheva enrolled in the Moscow Aviation Institute.

In 1941, she went to the front, serving in divisional reconnaissance on the Volokolamsk front. In June 1942, she attended a three-month reconnaissance course at the scout school in Gireyevo. After that, she served in the army reconnaissance unit of the 16th Army, commanded by Konstantin Rokossovsky. After a year and a half on the front line, she was wounded in battle and, following her time in the hospital, transferred to the mortar brigade headquarters, where she participated in the Battle of Stalingrad. From 1943 to 1945, she served in the fuel supply department of the 2nd Baltic and Leningrad Front headquarters.

She ended the war as a lieutenant of the administrative service.

After Victory Day, she served in Upper Silesia, Poland, until 1949. In 1949, she was reassigned to Potsdam and reached the rank of captain.

Upon leaving the army, she returned to Moscow Aviation Institute, joining the third year directly, and graduated to work as a rocket engine designer at TsNIIMash in Podlipki (now Korolyov). Malysheva worked in this field for 35 years, contributing to the design of orbital maneuvering and braking engines for the first ballistic missiles and spacecraft, including Gagarin’s Vostok. She was the only woman on the state commission for testing missile systems. Malysheva also contributed to the engine development for the S-75 surface-to-air missile system by Pyotr Grushin, for which she received an order. She was promoted to the military rank of major.

In retirement, she helped establish the metochion of the Pühtitsa Convent in Moscow, where she served as a simple nun after taking vows under the name Adriana. Mother Adriana received the international award "For Faith and Loyalty," established by the Andrew the Apostle Foundation.

== Awards ==
- Order of the Patriotic War, 2nd Class (March 11, 1985)
- Order of the Red Star (June 30, 1945)
- Two Orders of the Badge of Honor
- Medal "For Military Merit" (April 29, 1945)
- Medal "For the Defense of Moscow"
- Medal "For the Defense of Stalingrad"
- The international award "For Faith and Loyalty"
- Some anniversary medals of the Soviet Union

== Memory ==
- Картина «Наталья Владимировна Малышева (1921—2012 гг.). Разведчица ВОВ, с 2000 года — монахиня Адриана, насельница Пюхтицкого подворья» (худ. А. Шилов, 2008).
