= Grigorovich Stal-MAI =

1930s Soviet long-range aircraft

Stal-MAI
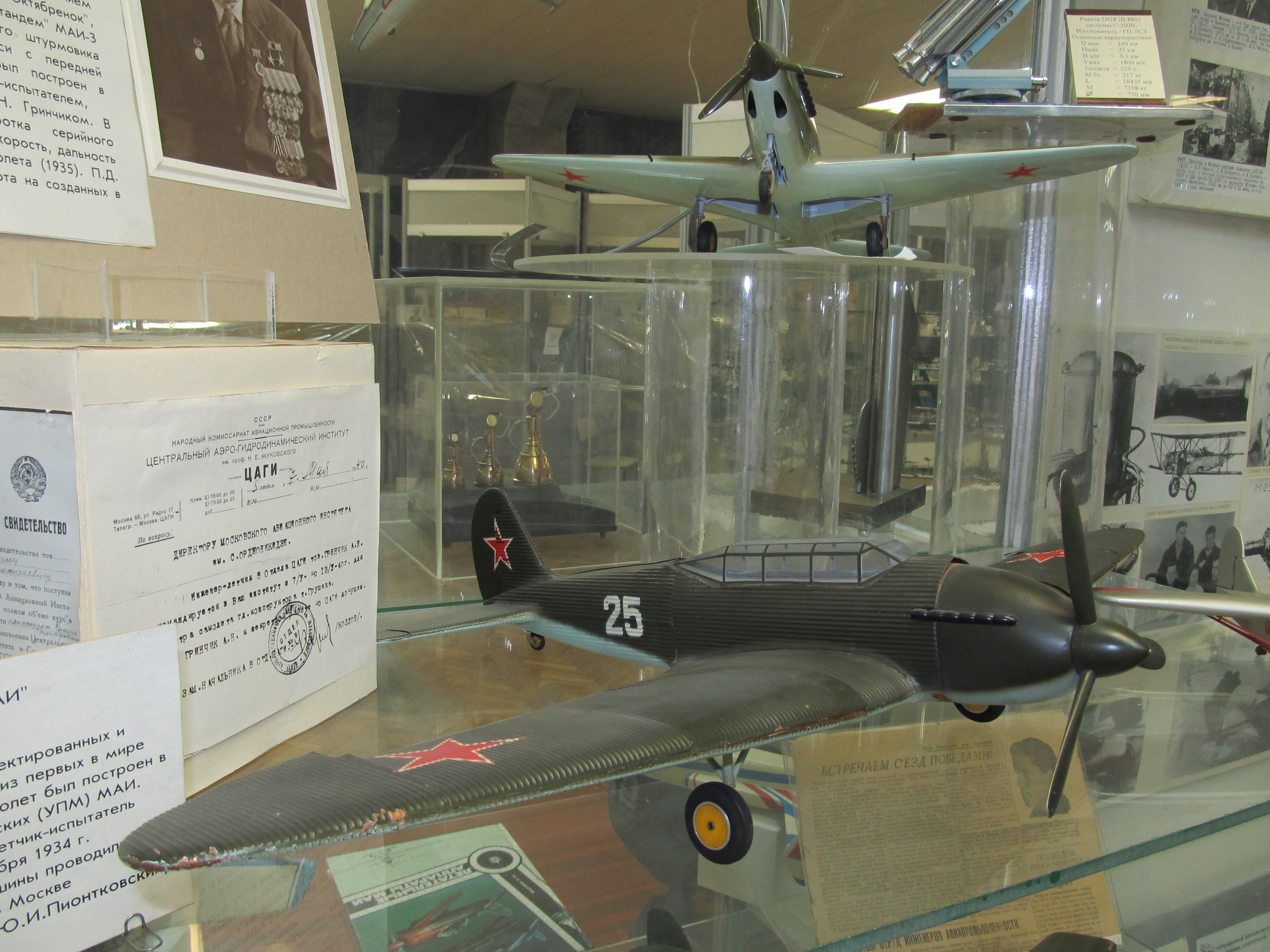
- Stal-MAI model at the Museum of Moscow Aviation Institute

General information
- Type: Long-range experimental aircraft
- National origin: Soviet Union
- Manufacturer: Moscow Aviation Institute
- Number built: 1

History
- First flight: 19 September 1934

The Stal-MAI (also called the RD-MAI) was a long-range experimental aircraft developed by the Moscow Aviation Institute under the supervision of Dmitry Grigorovich and later Pyotr Grushin. It first flew on 19 September 1934.

== Development and design ==
In December 1931 the government made the decision to build the Tupolev ANT-25 long-range aircraft. At the same time there was a need for an aircraft with a range of 5,000 km (3,100 mi; 2,700 nmi). In late 1931, Grigorovich, then the new director of the Moscow Aviation Institute (MAI), organized a group of students to design an aircraft of this type, among them Pyotr Grushin and Mikhail Pashinin. Grigorovich was focused on his cannon fighters and supervision later passed on to Grushin. The aircraft was completed in mid 1934 and first flown on 19 September 1934. The Stal-MAI was damaged in an accident, after which the aircraft was repaired but the project was discontinued.

The Stal-MAI was a low-wing cantilever monoplane with a two-spar trapezoidal wing and a braced empennage. It was powered by a single Mikulin M-34R liquid-cooled V12 engine equipped with a gearbox driving a variable-pitch propeller. The retractable landing gear was operated manually. The two-seat cockpit was enclosed by a single canopy. Except for the fabric-skinned control surfaces, the aircraft was made of steel. The Stal-MAI was among the first aircraft in the world to be constructed mainly out of steel.

== Specifications ==
Data from Dmitry Grigorovich's Aircraft

General characteristics

- Crew: 2
- Length: 11.5 m (37 ft 9 in)
- Wingspan: 18 m (59 ft 1 in)
- Height: 4.03 m (13 ft 3 in)
- Wing area: 40.5 m^{2} (436 sq ft)
- Empty weight: 2,410 kg (5,313 lb)
- Gross weight: 3,850–4,600 kg (8,488–10,141 lb)
- Fuel capacity: 1,000–1,800 kg (2,200–4,000 lb)
- Powerplant: 1 × Mikulin M-34R liquid-cooled V12 engine, 620 kW (830 hp)

Performance

- Maximum speed: 330–350 km/h (210–220 mph, 180–190 kn)
- Cruise speed: 290–300 km/h (180–190 mph, 160–160 kn)
- Range: 3,250–6,000 km (2,020–3,730 mi, 1,750–3,240 nmi)
- Service ceiling: 6,000 m (20,000 ft)
