= Anti-Ballistic Missile Treaty =

1972 arms control treaty between the United States and the Soviet Union

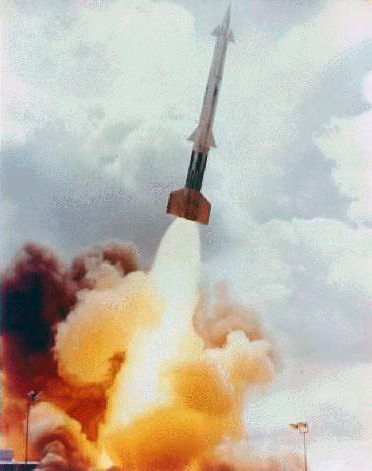
- Launch of a U.S. Army Nike Zeus missile, the first ABM system to enter widespread testing
- Type: Bilateral treaty
- Signed: 26 May 1972
- Location: Moscow, Russian SFSR, USSR
- Expired: 2002 (U.S. withdrawal)
- Signatories: (United States) Richard Nixon; (Soviet Union) Leonid Brezhnev
- Parties: United States; Soviet Union
- Ratifiers: United States Senate; Supreme Soviet

Full text
- Anti-Ballistic Missile Treaty at Wikisource

The Anti-Ballistic Missile Treaty, also known as the ABM Treaty or ABMT, was a 1972 arms control treaty between the United States and the Soviet Union on the limitation of the anti-ballistic missile (ABM) systems used in defending areas against strategic ballistic missiles, which are used to deliver nuclear weapons It was intended to reduce pressures to build more nuclear weapons to maintain deterrence. Signed in 1972, it was in force for the next 30 years. Citing purported risks of nuclear blackmail from a rogue state, the United States under the George W. Bush administration unilaterally withdrew from the treaty in June 2002, leading to its termination. In ICBM defense, the US has subsequently operated the Ground-Based Midcourse Defense ABM system based in Alaska and California, as well as the sea-based Aegis Ballistic Missile Defense System. Russia maintains the A-135 ABM system around Moscow, and has developed the S-500 missile system.

Under the terms of the original 1972 treaty, each party was limited to two ABM complexes, one for the nation's capital and one for an intercontinental ballistic missile silo field. Each ABM complex was limited to 100 anti-ballistic missiles and their launchers, two phased-array radars, and 18 smaller radars for early-warning. ABM missiles that were not static and ground-based were prohibited. In 1974, the limit was reduced to just a single ABM complex. The USSR chose to deploy the A-35 system around its capital Moscow, the US elected to deploy the Safeguard Complex around its ICBM fields of the Twentieth Air Force, although this was only operational for a year from 1974 to 1975. A 1997 treaty addendum permitted "theater missile defense": anti-ballistic missiles used against theatre ballistic missiles, as long as they were not tested against targets with velocities over 5 km/s, typical of ICBM terminal phase. Also in 1997, five years after the dissolution of the Soviet Union, its former member states Belarus, Kazakhstan, Russia, and Ukraine were established as successors to the USSR within the treaty, with one ABM system permitted between them.

== Background ==
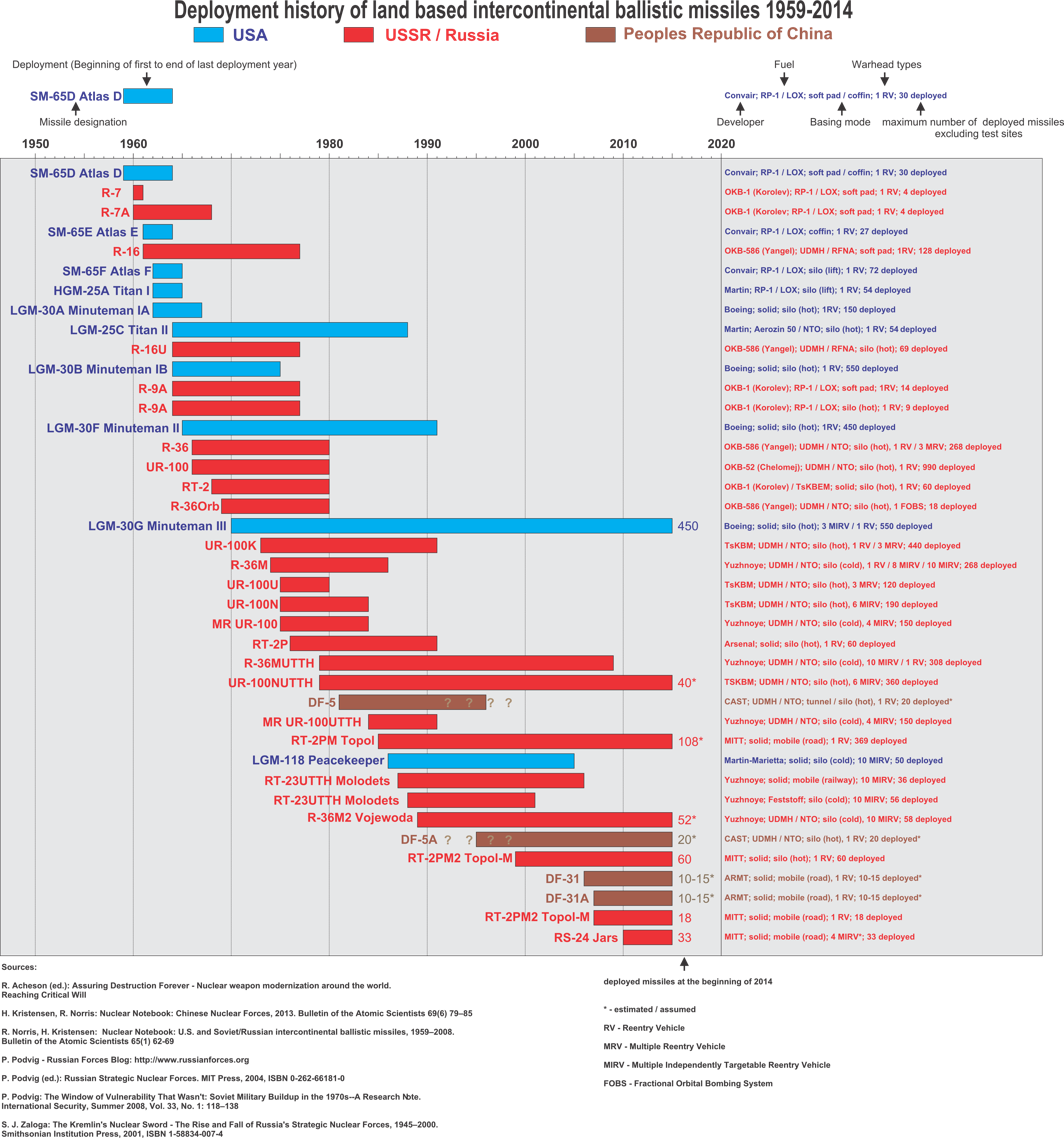
Deployment history of land based ICBM 1959–2014

Throughout the late 1950s and into the 1960s, the United States and the Soviet Union had been developing missile systems with the ability to shoot down incoming Intercontinental ballistic missile (ICBM) warheads. During this period, the US considered the defense of the US as part of reducing the overall damage inflicted in a full nuclear exchange. As part of this defense, Canada and the US established the North American Air Defense Command (now called North American Aerospace Defense Command).

By the early 1960s, US research on the Nike Zeus missile system had developed to the point where small improvements would allow it to be used as the basis of an operational ABM system. Work started on a short-range, high-speed counterpart known as Sprint to provide defense for the ABM sites themselves. By the mid-1960s, both systems showed enough promise to start development of base selection for a limited ABM system dubbed Sentinel. In 1967, the US announced that Sentinel itself would be scaled down to the smaller and less expensive Safeguard. Soviet doctrine called for development of its own ABM system and return to strategic parity with the US. This was achieved with the operational deployment of the A-35 ABM system and its successors, which remain operational to this day.

The development of multiple independently targetable reentry vehicle (MIRV) systems allowed a single ICBM to deliver as many as ten separate warheads at a time. An ABM defense system could be overwhelmed with the sheer number of warheads. Upgrading it to counter the additional warheads would be economically unfeasible: The defenders required one rocket per incoming warhead, whereas the attackers could place 10 warheads on a single missile at a reasonable cost. To further protect against ABM systems, the Soviet MIRV missiles were equipped with decoys; R-36M heavy missiles carried as many as 40. These decoys would appear as warheads to an ABM, effectively requiring engagement of five times as many targets and rendering defense even less effective.

== ABM Treaty ==
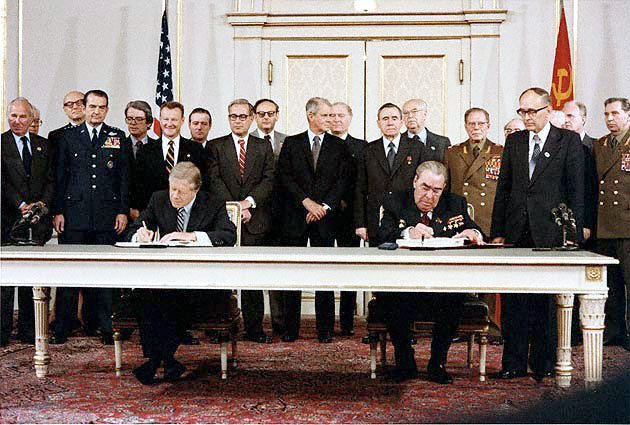
Jimmy Carter and Leonid Brezhnev signing SALT II treaty, 18 June 1979, in Vienna

The United States first proposed an anti-ballistic missile treaty at the 1967 Glassboro Summit Conference during discussions between U.S. Secretary of Defense Robert McNamara and Chairman of the Council of Ministers of the Soviet Union Alexei Kosygin. McNamara argued both that ballistic missile defense could provoke an arms race, and that it might provoke a first-strike against the nation fielding the defense. Kosygin rejected this reasoning. They were trying to minimize the number of nuclear missiles in the world. Following the proposal of the Sentinel and Safeguard decisions on American ABM systems, the Strategic Arms Limitation Talks began in November 1969 (SALT I). By 1972 an agreement had been reached to limit strategic defensive systems. Each country was allowed two sites at which it could base a defensive system, one for the capital and one for ICBM silos.

The treaty was signed during the 1972 Moscow Summit on 26 May by the President of the United States, Richard Nixon and the General Secretary of the Communist Party of the Soviet Union, Leonid Brezhnev; and ratified by the U.S. Senate on 3 August 1972.

The 1974 Protocol reduced the number of sites to one per party, largely because neither country had developed a second site. The sites were Moscow for the USSR and the North Dakota Safeguard Complex for the US, which was already under construction.

=== Missiles limited by the treaty ===
The Treaty limited only ABMs capable of defending against "strategic ballistic missiles", without attempting to define "strategic". It was understood that both ICBMs and SLBMs are obviously "strategic". Neither country intended to stop the development of counter-tactical ABMs. The topic became disputable as soon as most potent counter-tactical ABMs started to be capable of shooting down SLBMs (SLBMs naturally tend to be much slower than ICBMs), nevertheless both sides continued counter-tactical ABM development.

== After the SDI announcement ==
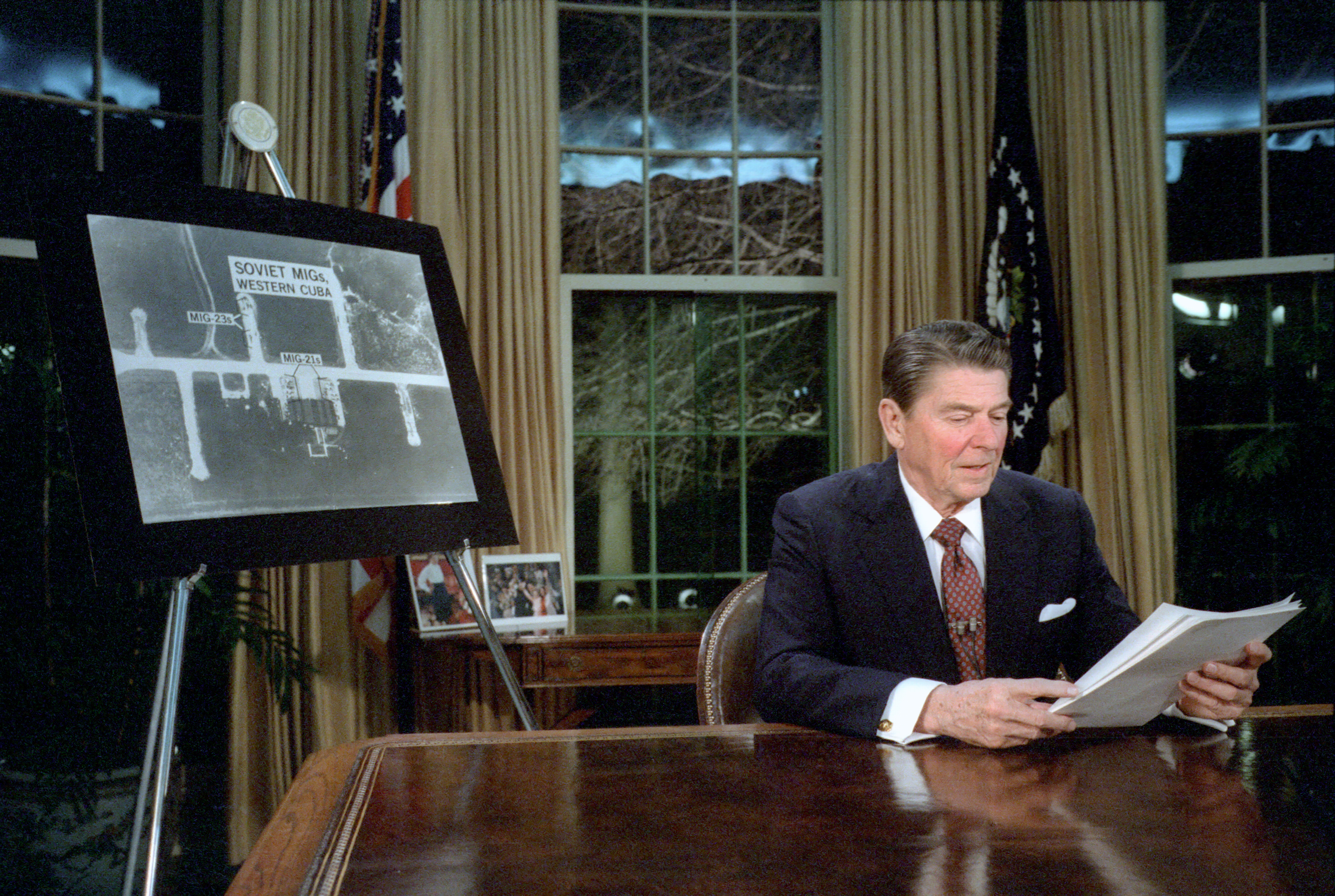
President Reagan delivering the 23 March 1983 speech initiating SDI

On 23 March 1983, US president Ronald Reagan announced the Strategic Defense Initiative, a research program into ballistic missile defense which he claimed would be "consistent with our obligations under the ABM Treaty". Reagan was wary of mutual deterrence with what he referred to as the "Evil Empire", and wanted to escape the traditional confines of mutual assured destruction. The project was a blow to Yuri Andropov's overtures for peace. Andropov said, "It is time Washington stopped thinking up one option after another in search of the best way of unleashing nuclear war in the hope of winning it. To do this is not just irresponsible. It is madness".

Regardless of the opposition, Reagan gave every indication that SDI would not be used as a bargaining chip and that the United States would do all in its power to build the system. The Soviets were alarmed because the Americans might have been able to make a nuclear first strike possible. In The Nuclear Predicament, Beckman claimed that one of the central goals of Soviet diplomacy was to terminate SDI. He went on to state that a surprise attack from the Americans would destroy much of the Soviet ICBM fleet, allowing SDI to defeat a "ragged" Soviet retaliatory response. The Soviets could not afford to ignore Reagan's new endeavour; therefore, their policy at the time was to enter negotiations with the Americans. By 1987, however, the USSR withdrew its opposition, concluding the SDI posed no threat and scientifically "would never work".

SDI research went ahead, although it did not achieve the hoped-for result. SDI research was cut back following the end of Reagan's presidency, and in 1995 it was reiterated in a presidential joint statement that "missile defense systems may be deployed... [that] will not pose a realistic threat to the strategic nuclear force of the other side and will not be tested to... [create] that capability." This was reaffirmed in 1997.

== Theater Missile Defense negotiations ==
The ABM Treaty prohibited "National Missile Defense" (NMD), but some interpreted it to allow more limited systems called "Theater Missile Defense" (TMD). This is because Article II of the treaty defined "ABM Systems" as those that "counter strategic missiles", which are typically defined as those with "intercontinental capability". Thus, TMD supporters argued, the treaty did not prohibit systems that defended against the countering of theatre ballistic missiles. The US had already developed and used such systems, including the Patriot Missile during the Gulf War.

The problem arose as TMD systems could also potentially be capable of countering strategic ballistic missiles, not just theatre ballistic missiles. The Clinton administration began negotiations with the Russian Government in 1993 to make amendments to the treaty. After much discussion, the American president, Bill Clinton, and his Russian counterpart, president Boris Yeltsin, signed an addendum to the treaty on September 9, 1997. According to these new agreements, the treaty permitted missile defense systems to have a velocity up to 5 km/s as long as it had not been tested against targets traveling faster than 5 km/s.

The 1997 agreement was eventually ratified by the Russian parliament on May 4, 2000 (along with START II treaty). However, it was opposed in the U.S. Senate by some Republican senators led by the hawkish anti-communist Jesse Helms. As a result, Clinton never submitted the agreement to Congress, fearing that Helms would stall their ratification or defeat it outright.

== After the dissolution of the USSR; United States and Russia ==
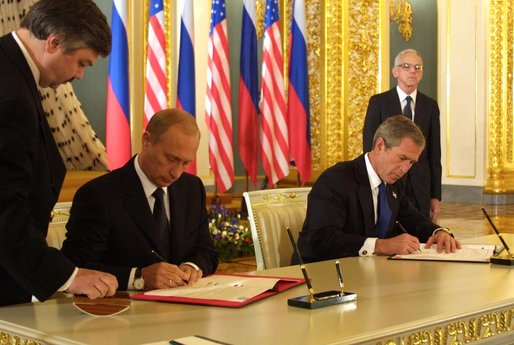
Presidents Vladimir Putin and George W. Bush sign SORT on 24 May 2002 in Moscow.

Although the Soviet Union ceased to exist in December 1991, in the view of the U.S. Department of State, the treaty continued in force. Russia was confirmed as the USSR's successor state in January 1992. Belarus and Ukraine were treated as successors at the ABM review conference in October 1993 and Kazakhstan was added as a successor shortly after. Belarus, Ukraine and Kazakhstan became regular participants at ABM treaty meetings known as Standing Consultative Commissions. An additional memorandum of understanding was prepared in 1997, establishing Belarus, Kazakhstan, the Russian Federation, and Ukraine as successor states to the Soviet Union, for the purposes of the treaty. The US considered only extending the obligations to these countries, and not all, as only these ones had significant ABM assets. As the ABM treaty allowed for only a single ABM deployment, the State Department deemed that only a single ABM system would be collectively permitted among Russia, Ukraine, Kazakhstan and Belarus.

In the United States, there was a debate on whether after the dissolution of the USSR, the ABM Treaty was still in effect. A month after the USSR's dissolution, President George H. W. Bush affirmed the ABM Treaty and regarded Russia as USSR's successor. Russia also accepted the ABM Treaty. Later on, President Clinton would affirm the validity of the treaty, as would President George W. Bush (before he terminated it). However, some Americans (mostly conservative Republicans) argued that the treaty was not in effect because the USSR had no successor state. This was deemed inconsistent, as Russia did indeed inherit the USSR's obligations (including its UNSC seat, its debts, its agreements on nonproliferation etc.). Former CIA director James Woolsey argued that in order for the treaty to remain in force, both the US and Russia had to accept it, and that President Clinton could not accept it without Congressional approval. According to Michael J. Glennon, Congress acknowledged the treaty in 1996, when it passed a law restricting President Clinton's ability to modify the treaty.

== Unilateral United States withdrawal ==
On 13 December 2001, George W. Bush gave Russia notice of the United States' unilateral withdrawal from the treaty, in accordance with the clause that required six months' notice before terminating the pact—the first time in the nuclear age that the United States withdrew from a strategic arms treaty. This led to the eventual creation of the American Missile Defense Agency.

Supporters of the withdrawal claimed that it was a necessity in order to test and build a limited National Missile Defense to protect the United States from nuclear blackmail by a rogue state. However, the withdrawal had many foreign and domestic critics, who said the construction of a missile defense system would lead to fears of a U.S. nuclear first strike, as the missile defense could blunt the retaliatory strike that would otherwise deter such a preemptive attack. John Rhinelander, a negotiator of the ABM treaty, predicted that the withdrawal would be a "fatal blow" to the Non-Proliferation Treaty and would lead to a "world without effective legal constraints on nuclear proliferation". Former U.S. Secretary of Defense William Perry also criticized the U.S. withdrawal as a very bad decision.

=== Russian response ===
The then-newly elected Russian president, Vladimir Putin, responded to the withdrawal by ordering a build-up of Russia's nuclear capabilities, designed to counterbalance U.S. capabilities, although he noted there was no immediate danger stemming from the US withdrawal. Russia and the United States signed the Strategic Offensive Reductions Treaty in Moscow on 24 May 2002. This treaty mandates cuts in deployed strategic nuclear warheads, but without actually mandating cuts to total stockpiled warheads, and without any mechanism for enforcement. On June 13, 2002, the US withdrew from ABM (having given notice 6 months earlier). The next day, Russia responded by declaring it would no longer abide by the START II treaty, which had not entered into force.

In interviews with Oliver Stone in 2017, Russian president Vladimir Putin said that in trying to persuade Russia to accept US withdrawal from the treaty, both Bill Clinton and George W. Bush had tried, without evidence, to convince him of an emerging nuclear threat from Iran. On 1 March 2018, Russian president Vladimir Putin, in an address to the Federal Assembly, announced the development of a series of technologically new "super weapons" in response to U.S. withdrawal from the ABM Treaty. His statements were referred to by an anonymous US official under the Trump administration as largely "boastful untruths". He said that the U.S. decision triggered the Russian Government to order an increase in Russia's nuclear capabilities, designed to counterbalance U.S. ones. In 2021, Putin cited U.S. withdrawal among his grievances against the West: "We tried to partner with the West for many years, but the partnership was not accepted, it didn't work," often citing it as one of America's great post-Cold War sins.
