= Don-2N radar =

Russian missile defence radar in Moscow

Don-2N Дон-2Н
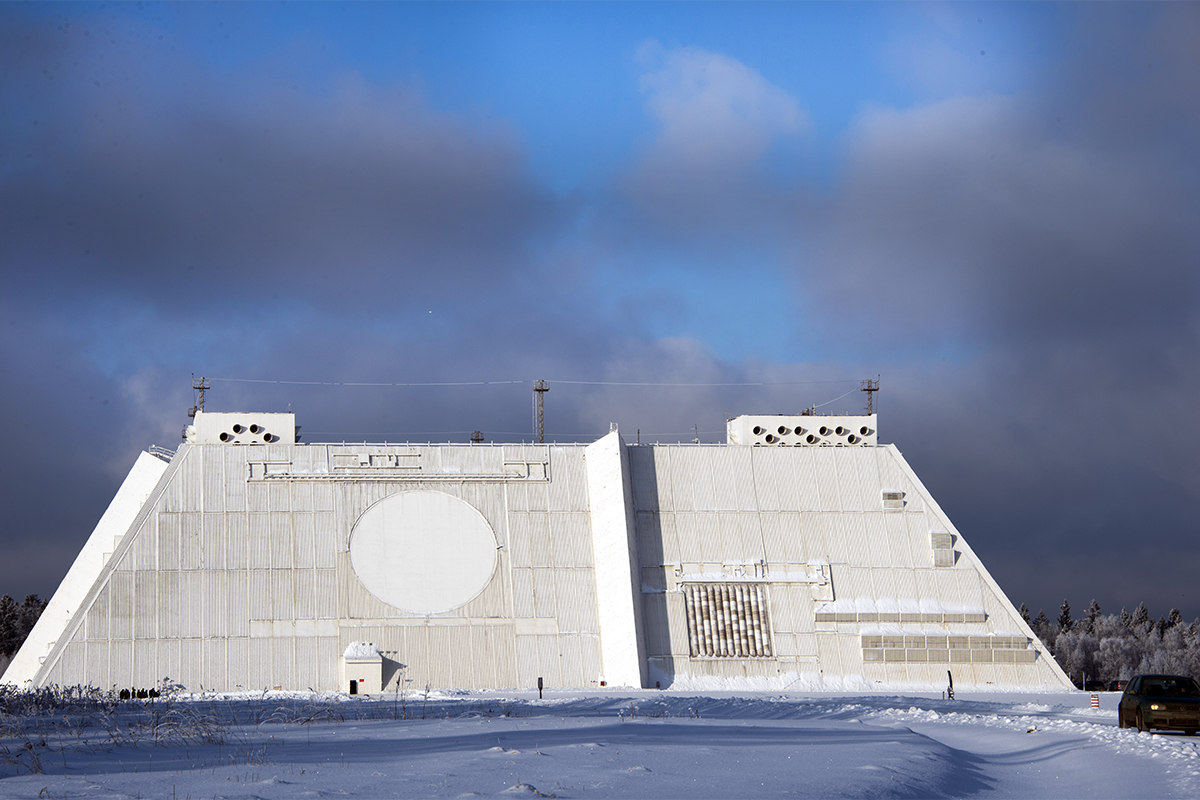
- Don-2N radar in January 2018
- Country of origin: Soviet Union, Russia
- Designer: Mints Radiotechnical Institute
- Introduced: 1991 1996 Started building 1978, commissioned 1989, operational 1996
- No. built: 1
- Type: Early warning radar, missile defence, space surveillance
- Frequency: 4 GHz (7.5 cm wavelength)
- Range: 1,500–2,000 km (930–1,240 mi) size of target 5 cm×5 cm (2 in×2 in)
- Diameter: 18 m (59 ft)
- Azimuth: 360º
- Other names: NATO: Pill Box

Don-2N (Moscow Oblast)

The Don-2N radar (Russian: Дон-2Н, NATO: Pill Box) is a large missile defense and early warning active electronically scanned array radar outside Moscow, and a key part of the Russian A-135 anti-ballistic missile system designed for the defense of the capital against ballistic missiles. Located near Sofrino in Pushkinsky District of Moscow Oblast, it is a quadrangular frustum 33 m (108 ft) tall with sides 130 m (427 ft) long at the bottom, and 90 m (295 ft) long at the top. Each of its four faces has an 18 m (59 ft) diameter super high frequency band radar giving 360 degree coverage. To the right of each circular search and track array, separated by a vertical structure for shielding, is a square antenna array (edge length 10 m) for guiding the interceptor missile by data link. The system is run by an Elbrus-2 (Russian: Эльбрус-2) supercomputer.

It has a range of 3,700 km for targets the size of a typical ICBM warhead.

Under the 1972 Anti-Ballistic Missile Treaty both the United States and the Soviet Union had to designate one area to protect from missile attack. The USA chose North Dakota and the Soviet Union chose Moscow. The Don-2N radar is designed to be the control centre of the system and can operate autonomously if connection is lost to its command and control centre.

The 1998 SIOP targeted this radar facility with 69 consecutive nuclear weapons.

== Don prototype ==
The prototype Don radar, called Don-2NP (Russian: Дон-2НП, NATO: Horse Leg) is in Sary Shagan test site in Kazakhstan, location 46°0′11″N 73°38′58″E.

== See also ==
- Dead Hand
- Stanley R. Mickelsen Safeguard Complex
