= Pyotr Grushin =

Soviet aerospace engineer

- Пётр Грушин
- Born: January 15, 1906; Volsk, Russian Empire
- Died: November 29, 1993 (aged 87); Moscow, Russia
- Occupation: Chief Designer of MKB Fakel

Pyotr Dmitrievich Grushin (Russian: Пётр Дмитриевич Грушин, January 15, 1906, Volsk, Russian Empire – November 29, 1993) was a Soviet rocket scientist and, from 1966, an academician of the Academy of Sciences of the USSR.

Grushin graduated from Moscow Aviation Institute, where he participated in the development of the Stal-MAI aircraft (Russian: Сталь-МАИ, 1931–1934). Later, he became a chief designer of KB MAI (1934–1940), where he developed the light bomber BB-MAI and some other designs.

His later designed the heavy long-range fighter IDS (Russian: ИДС), later renamed Gr-1 after Grushin. The plane made its first flights in 1940–1941 at Kharkov Aviation Plant (KhAZ) 135 (with Grushin as a Chief designer of KhAZ OKB), but after the war began it was destroyed in an air raid.

He worked as the Chief engineer on Plant 21 and later as vice chief designer to Lavochkin at his Lavochkin design bureau.

He was the chief developer of a number of air defence systems at KB Fakel (until 1967, OKB-2) located in Khimki. This design bureau now bears his name.

For the design of the V-750 missile, the interceptor component of the S-75 Dvina air defense system, Grushin was awarded the Hero of Socialist Labour in 1958. This missile downed U-2 spy-plane of Francis Powers on May 1, 1960 near Sverdlovsk.

In 1981 he received his second Hero of Socialist Labour award for the S-300 missile system.

He was a laureate of the Lenin Prize (1963), and held 7 Orders of Lenin, among other awards.

== Honours and awards ==
- Twice Hero of Socialist Labour
- Seven Orders of Lenin
- Order of the October Revolution
- Order of the Red Banner of Labour
- Jubilee Medal "In Commemoration of the 100th Anniversary since the Birth of Vladimir Il'ich Lenin"
- Medal "For the Victory over Germany in the Great Patriotic War 1941–1945"
- Jubilee Medal "Twenty Years of Victory in the Great Patriotic War 1941-1945"
- Jubilee Medal "Thirty Years of Victory in the Great Patriotic War 1941-1945"
- Jubilee Medal "Forty Years of Victory in the Great Patriotic War 1941-1945"
- Medal "For Valiant Labour in the Great Patriotic War 1941-1945"
- Medal "Veteran of Labour"
- Lenin Prize
- USSR State Prize

== Sources ==
- (in Russian) "Fakel missiles", under editing by Chief designer of MKB Fakel V.G. Svetlov, Moscow, 2003.
- (in Russian) Grushin Gr-1 (IDS)
- Red Sam: The SA-2 Guideline Anti-Aircraft Missile. Author: Steven J. Zaloga
- Yury Zaitsev, Outside View: Russia's ABM plans -- Part 1, May 20, 2008
- Mike Gruntman, Blazing the Trail: The Early History of Spacecraft and Rocketry, pp 407, 408
