= A-135 anti-ballistic missile system =

51T6 (ABM-4 Gorgon)
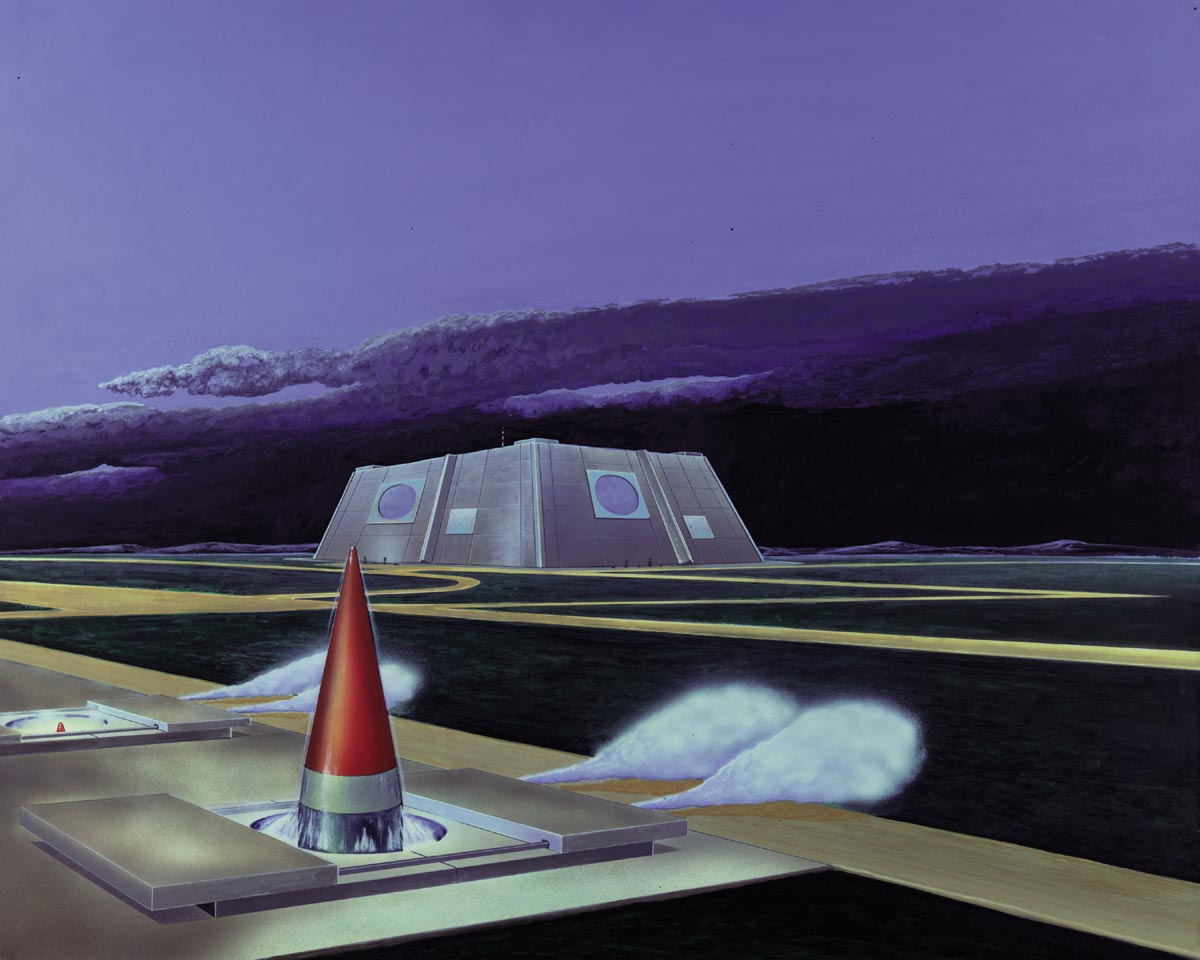
- DIA drawing of an SH-08/ABM-3A GAZELLE 53T6 missile launching with Don-2 phased array radar in background
- Type: Anti-ballistic missile
- Place of origin: Soviet Union

Service history
- In service: 1995–present
- Used by: Russia

Production history
- Designer: NPO Novator Design Bureau
- Designed: 1978
- Produced: 1988
- No. built: 68

Specifications
- Mass: 33,000–45,000 kg (73,000–100,000 lb)
- Length: 19.8 m
- Diameter: 2.57 m
- Blast yield: 10 kilotonnes of TNT (42 TJ)
- Engine: 2-stage, solid-fuel
- Operational range: 350–900 km
- Flight ceiling: 350–900 km
- Maximum speed: Mach 7 (8,600 km/h; 5,300 mph; 2.4 km/s)
- Launch platform: silo, launcher(?)

A-135 ABM system in Moscow Oblast. The black missiles are operational 53T6s, the unfilled missiles are non-operational 51T6s and the dish is the Don-2N radar in Sofrino, which also has a 53T6 complex co-located with it

The A-135 (NATO: ABM-4 Gorgon) is a Russian anti-ballistic missile system deployed around Moscow to intercept incoming warheads targeting the city or its surrounding areas. The system was designed in the Soviet Union and entered service in 1995. It is a successor to the previous A-35, and complies with the 1972 Anti-Ballistic Missile Treaty.

The system is operated by the 9th Division of Anti-Missile Defence, part of the Air Defence and Missile Defence Command of the Russian Aerospace Defence Forces.

== History ==
A memo from the archives of Vitalii Kataev, written around 1985, had envisaged that the system "will be completed in 1987 to provide protection from a strike of 1–2 modern and prospective ICBMs and up to 35 Pershing 2-type intermediate-range missiles".

The A-135 system attained "alert" (operational) status on February 17, 1995. It is operational although its 51T6 component was deactivated in February 2007. A newer missile (PRS-1M) is expected to replace it. There is an operational test version of the system at the Sary Shagan test site in Kazakhstan.

=== Testing ===
In November 2017, a successful test of the 53T6 interceptor was carried out. Target speed up to 3 kilometers per second (53T6 speed 3), acceleration overload – 100 G, preload maneuvering – 210 G.

== Structure ==
A-135 early warning radars

A-135 consists of the Don-2N battle management radar and two types of ABM missiles. It gets its data from the wider Russian early-warning radar network, that are sent to the command centre which then forwards tracking data to the Don-2N radar. The Don-2N radar is a large battle-management phased array radar with 360° coverage. Tests were undertaken at the prototype Don-2NP in Sary Shagan in 2007 to upgrade its software.

Russian early-warning radar network consists of:

- Daryal bistatic active phased array early-warning radars
- Dnepr/Dnestr space surveillance early-warning radars
- Voronezh phased array early-warning radars
- US-KMO, US-K and EKS early-warning satellites
- Command, control, communications and intelligence services

=== Deployment ===
There are at least 68 active launchers of short-range 53T6 endoatmospheric interceptor nuclear armed missiles, 12 or 16 missiles each, deployed at five launch sites. These are tested roughly annually at the Sary Shagan test site. In addition, 16 retired launchers of long-range 51T6 exoatmospheric interceptor nuclear armed missiles, 8 missiles each, are located at two launch sites.

Location	Coordinates	Number	Details
Active
Sofrino	56°10′51.97″N 37°47′16.81″E	12	Co-located with the Don-2N radar
Lytkarino	55°34′39.04″N 37°46′17.67″E	16	
Korolev	55°52′41.09″N 37°53′36.50″E	12	
Skhodnya	55°54′04.11″N 37°18′28.30″E	16	
Vnukovo	55°37′32.45″N 37°23′22.41″E	12	
Retired
Sergiyev Posad-15	56°14′33.01″N 38°34′27.29″E	8	Site was also used in the A-35 system
Naro-Fominsk-10	55°21′01.16″N 36°28′59.60″E	8	Site was also used in the A-35 system

== Successor (A-235) ==
The successor system, dubbed 'Samolet-M' (and more recently A-235) will employ a new, conventional, variant of the 53T6 missile to be deployed in the former 51T6 silos. The new PRS-1M is a modernized variant of the PRS-1 (53T6) and can use nuclear or conventional warheads. It can hit targets at ranges of 350 km and altitudes of 50 km.

== Gallery ==
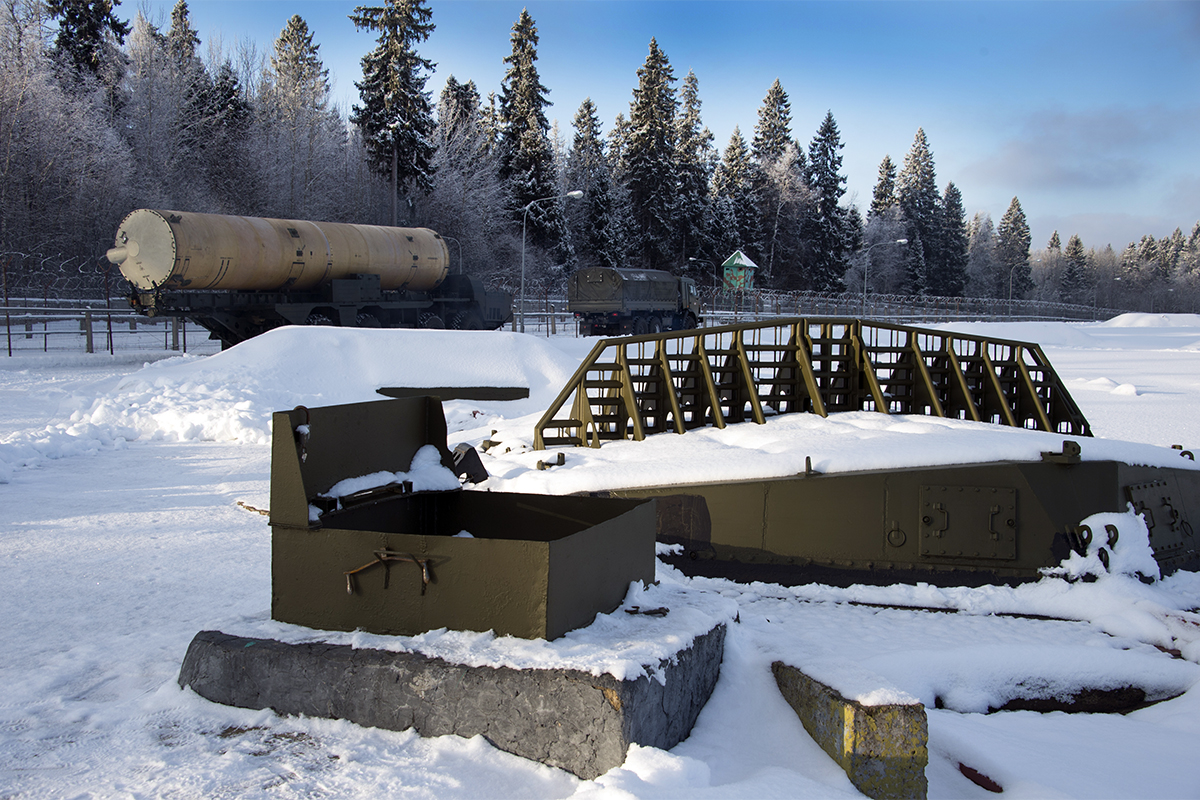
ABM missile silo under snow, transporter for 53Т6 missile in background

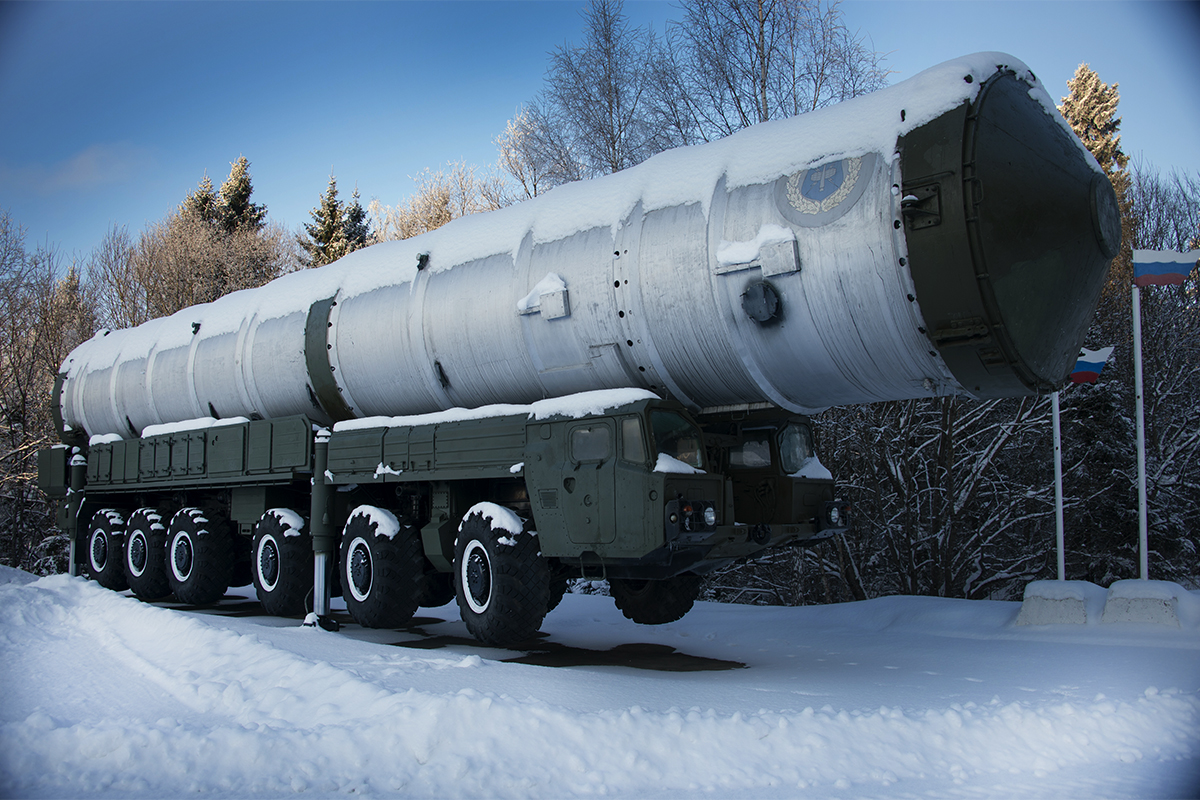
Transporter for 51Т6 missile

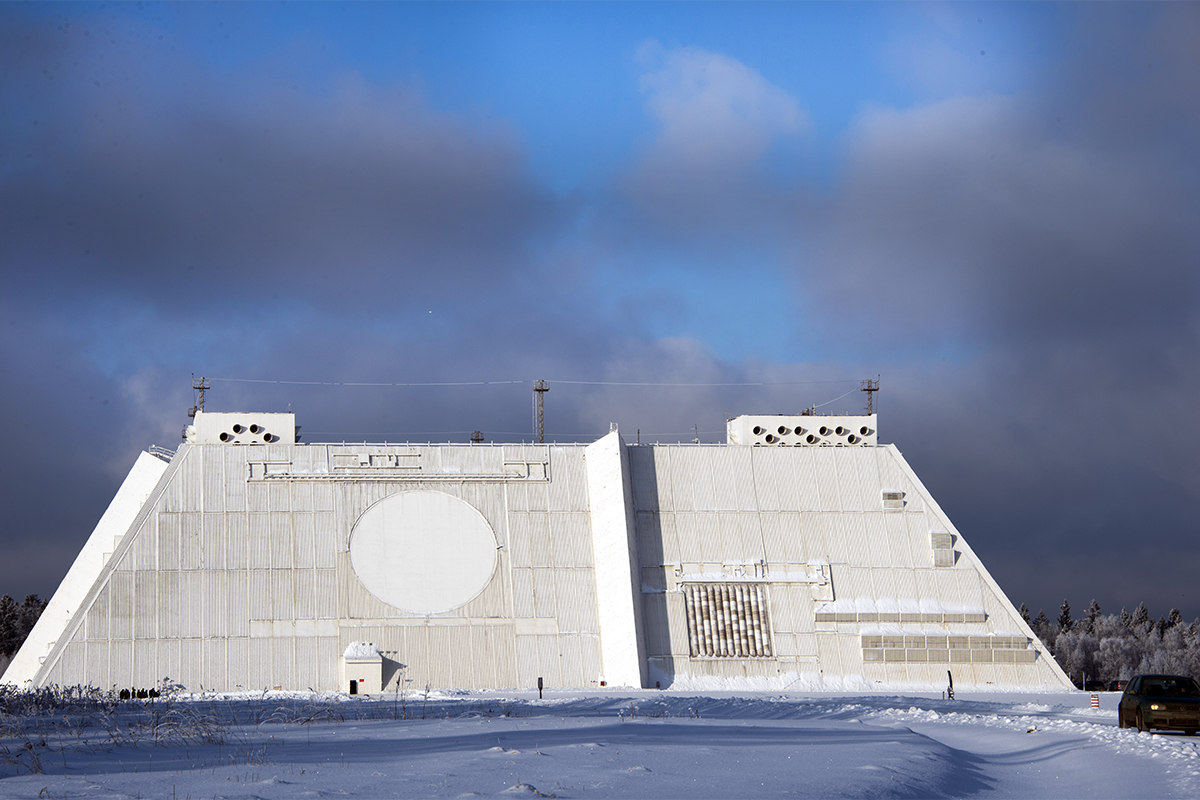
Don-2N anti-ballistic missile radar

== See also ==
- Main Centre for Missile Attack Warning – (Russia)
- A-35 anti-ballistic missile system
- A-235 anti-ballistic missile system – (Russia)
- Ground-Based Midcourse Defense – (United States)
- Comparison of anti-ballistic missile systems
