= Strategic Defense Initiative =

U.S. military defense program (1984–1993)

Strategic Defense Initiative Organization

Agency overview
- Formed: 1984
- Preceding agency: Ballistic Missile Defense Organization
- Dissolved: 1993 (renamed)
- Superseding agency: Ballistic Missile Defense Organization Missile Defense Agency
- Jurisdiction: Federal government of the United States

The Strategic Defense Initiative (SDI), nicknamed the Star Wars program, was a proposed missile defense system intended to protect the United States from attack by ballistic nuclear missiles. The program was announced in 1983 by President Ronald Reagan, a vocal critic of the doctrine of mutual assured destruction (MAD), which he described as a "suicide pact". Reagan called for a system that would end MAD and render nuclear weapons obsolete. Elements of the program reemerged in 2019 under the Space Development Agency (SDA).

The Strategic Defense Initiative Organization (SDIO) was set up in 1984 within the US Department of Defense to oversee development. Advanced weapon concepts, including lasers, particle-beam weapons, and ground and space-based missile systems were studied, along with sensor, command and control, and computer systems needed to control a system consisting of hundreds of combat centers and satellites spanning the globe. The US held a significant advantage in advanced missile defense systems through decades of extensive research and testing. Several concepts, technologies and insights obtained were transferred to subsequent programs. SDIO funded basic research at national laboratories, universities, and in industry. These programs have continued to be key sources of funding for research scientists in particle physics, supercomputing/computation, advanced materials, and other critical science and engineering disciplines.

SDI was heavily criticized for threatening to destabilize MAD and re-ignite "an offensive arms race". Senator Ted Kennedy derided the program as "reckless Star Wars schemes", a reference to the film series Star Wars, popularizing the monicker. In 1987, the American Physical Society (APS) concluded that the technologies were decades away from readiness, and at least another decade of research was required to know whether such a system was even possible. After the publication of the APS report, SDI's budget was cut. By the late 1980s, the effort had re-focused on the "Brilliant Pebbles" concept using small orbiting missiles.

Declassified intelligence material revealed that through the potential neutralization of its arsenal and resulting loss of a balancing power factor, SDI was a cause of grave concern for the Soviet Union and its successor state Russia. Following the Cold War, when nuclear arsenals were shrinking, political support for SDI collapsed. SDI ended in 1993, when the Clinton administration redirected the efforts towards theatre ballistic missiles and renamed the agency the Ballistic Missile Defense Organization (BMDO).

In 2019, elements, specifically the observation portions, of the program re-emerged with President Trump's signing of the National Defense Authorization Act. The program is managed by the Space Development Agency (SDA) as part of the new National Defense Space Architecture (NDSA). CIA director Mike Pompeo called for additional funding to achieve a full-fledged "Strategic Defense Initiative for our time, the SDI II." On May 20, 2025, President Donald Trump announced the Golden Dome, a project broadly similar to SDI, which he referenced in the announcement.

== History ==
=== National BMD ===
The US Army considered the issue of ballistic missile defense (BMD) after World War II. Studies suggested that attacking a V-2 rocket would be difficult because the flight time was so short that it would leave little time to forward information through command and control networks to missile batteries. Bell Labs noted that longer-range missiles, though faster, had longer flight times that eased the timing issue. Their high altitudes also made them easier to detect with long-range radar.

This led to successive programs—Nike Zeus, Nike-X, Sentinel, and ultimately Safeguard—each seeking to defend against Soviet ICBMs. The programs proliferated because of the changing threat; the Soviets claimed to be producing missiles "like sausages", and ever-more missiles would be needed to defend against their fleet. Low-cost countermeasures such as radar decoys required additional interceptors. An early estimate suggested $20 spent on defense would be required for every $1 the Soviets spent on offense. The addition of MIRV in the late 1960s further moved the balance in favor of offensive systems. This massively skewed cost-exchange ratio prompted observers to propose that an arms race was inevitable.

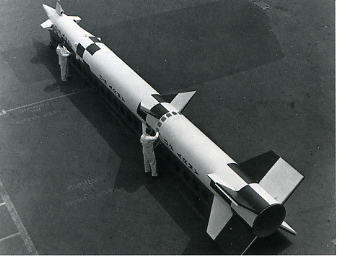
The Extended Range Nike Zeus/Spartan missile of the late-1960s was designed to provide full-country defense as part of the Sentinel-Safeguard programs. Projected to cost $40 billion ($397 billion in 2025), the system was expected to provide only limited protection in the event of a large-scale Soviet strike.

President Dwight D. Eisenhower asked DARPA to consider alternative concepts. Their Project Defender studied many approaches before concentrating on Project BAMBI. BAMBI used satellites carrying interceptors that would attack the Soviet ICBMs upon launch. This boost phase intercept rendered MIRV impotent; a successful attack would destroy all of the warheads. The projected operational costs were prohibitive, and the U.S. Air Force ultimately rejected the concept. Development was cancelled in 1963.

By the late 1960s, ballistic missile defense had become highly controversial. Public meetings on the Sentinel system drew thousands of protesters, reflecting growing opposition to its deployment. After thirty years of effort, only one such system was built; a single base of the original Safeguard system became operational in April 1975, but was closed in February 1976.

A Soviet military A-35 anti-ballistic missile system was deployed around Moscow to intercept enemy ballistic missiles targeting the city or its surrounding areas. The A-35 was the only Soviet ABM system allowed under the 1972 Anti-Ballistic Missile Treaty. In development since the 1960s and in operation from 1971 until the 1990s, it featured the nuclear-tipped A350 exoatmospheric interceptor missile.

=== Lead up to SDI ===
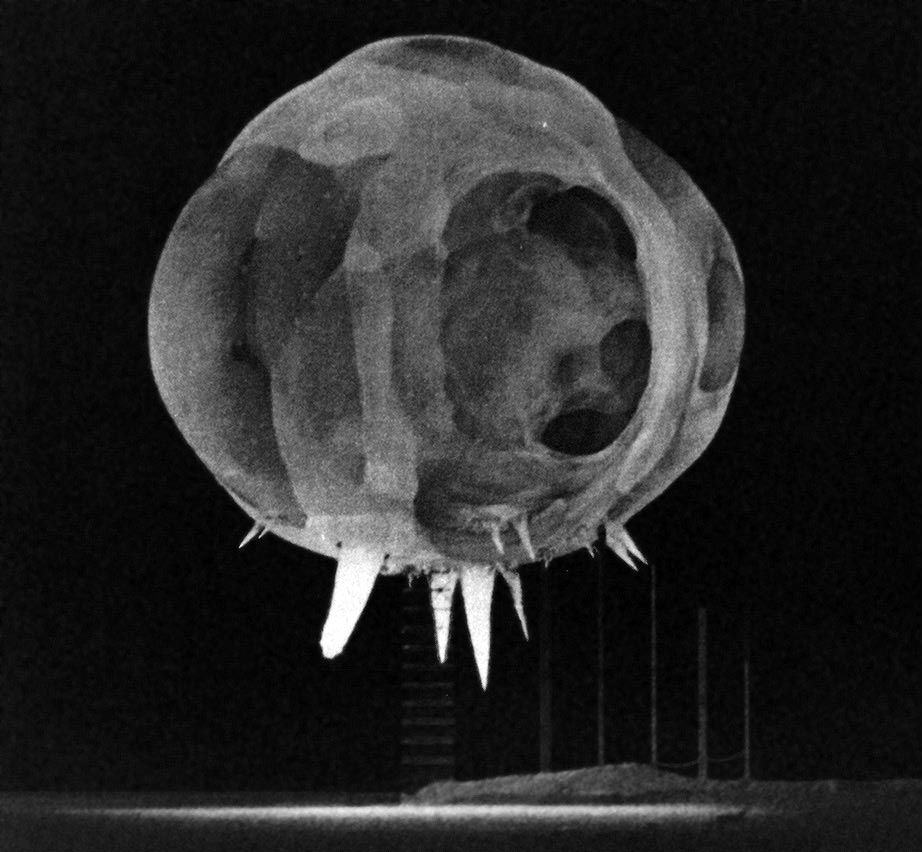
The bright spikes extending below the initial fireball of one of 1952's Operation Tumbler–Snapper test shots, are known as the "rope trick effect". They are caused by the intense flash of thermal/soft X-rays released by the explosion heating the steel tower guy-wires white hot. The development of the W71 and the Project Excalibur x-ray laser were based on enhancing the destructive effects of these x-rays.

George Shultz, Reagan's secretary of state, suggested that a 1967 lecture by physicist Edward Teller was an important precursor to SDI. In the lecture, Teller talked about the idea of defending against nuclear missiles using nuclear weapons, principally the W65 and W71, with the latter an enhanced thermal/X-ray device used on the Spartan missile in 1975. Held at Lawrence Livermore National Laboratory (LLNL), the 1967 lecture was attended by Reagan shortly after he became governor of California.

Development of laser weapons in the Soviet Union began in 1964–1965. Though classified at the time, a detailed study on a Soviet space-based laser system began no later than 1976 with the Polyus, a 1 MW Carbon dioxide laser-based orbital weapons platform prototype. Development was also started on the anti-satellite Kaskad in-orbit missile platform.

A revolver cannon (Rikhter R-23) was mounted on the 1974 Soviet Salyut 3 space station, a satellite that successfully test-fired its cannon in orbit.

In 1979, Teller contributed to a Hoover Institution publication where he claimed that the US would be facing an emboldened USSR due to their work on civil defense. Two years later at a conference in Italy, he made the same claims about their ambitions, now emboldened by new space-based weapons. According to popular opinion, shared by author Frances FitzGerald, no evidence validated that such research was carried out. Instead, Teller was promoting his latest weapon, the X-ray laser that was finding only limited funding, his speech in Italy was a new attempt to synthesize a missile gap.

In 1979, Reagan visited the NORAD command base, Cheyenne Mountain Complex, where he was introduced to the extensive tracking and detection systems extending throughout the world and into space. He was struck by their comments that while they could track the attack down to the individual targets, they could not stop it. Reagan felt that in the event of an attack, this would place the president in a terrible position, having to choose between immediate counterattack or absorbing the attack while maintaining offensive dominance. Shultz suggested that this feeling of helplessness, coupled with Teller's defensive ideas combined to motivate SDI.

In the fall of 1979, at Reagan's request, Lieutenant General Daniel O. Graham, the former head of the DIA, briefed Reagan on an updated BAMBI he called High Frontier, a missile shield composed of multi-layered ground- and space-based weapons that could track, intercept, and destroy ballistic missiles, theoretically enabled by emerging technologies. It was designed to replace the MAD doctrine. In September 1981, Graham formed a small, Virginia-based think tank called High Frontier to continue research on the missile shield. The Heritage Foundation provided High Frontier with research space, and Graham published a 1982 report (entitled "High Frontier: A New National Strategy") that examined in greater detail how the system would function.

Since the late 1970s, another group had been pushing for the development of a high-powered orbital chemical laser attack ICBMs, the Space Based Laser (SBL). New developments under Project Excalibur by Teller's "O-Group" at LLNL suggested that a single X-ray laser could shoot down dozens of missiles with a single shot. The groups began to meet in order to prepare their plans for the incoming US president Reagan.

The group met with Reagan several times during 1981 and 1982, apparently with little effect, while the buildup of new offensive weaponry like the B-1 Lancer and MX missile continued. However, in early 1983, the Joint Chiefs of Staff met with Reagan and outlined the reasons why they might consider shifting some of the funding from the offensive side to new defensive systems.

According to a 1983 US Interagency Intelligence Assessment, good evidence indicated that in the late 1960s the Soviets were devoting serious thought to both explosive and non-explosive nuclear power sources for lasers.

== Project and proposals ==
President Reagan delivering the March 23, 1983, speech initiating SDI

=== Announcement ===
On March 23, 1983, Reagan announced SDI in a nationally televised speech, stating "I call upon the scientific community in this country, those who gave us nuclear weapons, to turn their great talents to the cause of mankind and world peace, to give us the means of rendering these nuclear weapons impotent and obsolete."

=== Strategic Defense Initiative Organization (SDIO) ===
In 1984, the Strategic Defense Initiative Organization (SDIO) was established to oversee the program, which was headed by Lt. General James Alan Abrahamson USAF, a past Director of the Space Shuttle program.

In addition to original Heritage ideas, other concepts were considered. Notable among these were particle-beam weapons, updated versions of nuclear shaped charges, and various plasma weapons. SDIO invested in computer systems, component miniaturization, and sensors.

Initially, the program focused on large-scale systems designed to defeat a massive Soviet offensive strike. For this mission, SDIO concentrated almost entirely on "high tech" solutions like lasers. Graham's proposal was repeatedly rejected by members of the Heritage group as well as within SDIO; when asked about it in 1985, Abrahamson suggested that the concept was underdeveloped and was not considered.

By 1986, many of the promising ideas were failing. Teller's X-ray laser, run under Project Excalibur, failed several key tests in 1986 and was targeted to the anti-satellite role. The particle beam concept was demonstrated to basically not work, as was the case with several other concepts. Only the Space-Based Laser seemed to have any hope of developing in the short term, but it was growing in size due to its fuel consumption.

=== APS report ===
The American Physical Society (APS) had been asked by SDIO to provide a review of the various concepts. They put together an all-star panel including many of the inventors of the laser, including a Nobel laureate. Their initial report was presented in 1986, but was released to the public (in redacted form) in early 1987.

The report considered all of the systems then under development and concluded none of them were anywhere near ready for deployment. Specifically, they noted that all of the systems had to improve their energy output by at least 100 times, and in some cases by as much as a million. In other cases, like Excalibur, they dismissed the concept entirely. Their summary stated simply:

We estimate that all existing candidates for directed energy weapons (DEWs) require two or more orders of magnitude, (powers of 10) improvements in power output and beam quality before they may be seriously considered for application in ballistic missile defense systems.

They concluded that none of the systems could be deployed as an anti-missile system until the next century.

=== Strategic Defense System ===
Faced with this report and accompanying negative press, SDIO changed direction. Beginning in late 1986, Abrahamson proposed that SDI would be based on the system he had previously dismissed, a version of High Frontier now named the "Strategic Defense System, Phase I Architecture". The name implied that the concept would be replaced by more advanced systems in future phases.

Strategic Defense System (SDS) was the low-earth orbit (LEO) Smart Rocks concept with an added layer of ground-based missiles sited in the US. These missiles were intended to attack warheads that the Smart Rocks missed. In order to track them below the radar horizon, SDS added more LEO satellites that would feed tracking information to both the space-based "garages" as well as the ground-based missiles. Later ground-based systems trace derived from this concept.

LLNL then introduced the Brilliant Pebbles concept. This was essentially the combination of the sensors on the garage satellites and the tracking stations. Advancements in sensors and microprocessors allowed this to be packaged in a small missile nose cone. Subsequent studies suggested that this approach would be cheaper, easier to launch and more resistant to counterattack, and in 1990 Brilliant Pebbles was selected as the baseline model for SDS Phase 1.

=== Global Protection Against Limited Strikes ===
While SDIO pursued SDS, the Warsaw Pact was rapidly disintegrating, culminating in the destruction of the Berlin Wall in 1989. One of the many reports on SDS considered these events and suggested that a massive defense against a Soviet launch would become unnecessary. However, short and medium range missile technology would likely proliferate as the Soviet Union disintegrated and sold off its hardware. One of the core ideas behind Global Protection Against Limited Strikes (GPALS) was that the Soviet Union would not always be the aggressor and the United States would not always be the target.

Instead of a heavy defense aimed at ICBMs, this report suggested realigning GPALS deployment. Against novel threats the Brilliant Pebbles would have limited utility, largely because the missiles fired for only a short period and the warheads did not rise high enough for them to be easily tracked by a satellite above them. GPALS thus added a mobile ground-based missile and more low-orbit satellites known as Brilliant Eyes to feed the Pebbles.

GPALS was approved by President George H.W. Bush in 1991. The system would cut the proposed costs of the SDI system from $53 billion to $41 billion over a decade. Instead of attempting to protect against thousands of incoming missiles, GPALS sought to provide protection from up to two hundred nuclear missiles. GPALS was tasked to protect the United States from attacks coming from all different parts of the world.

=== Ballistic Missile Defense Organization (BMDO) ===
In 1993, the Clinton administration further shifted the focus to ground-based interceptor missiles and theater-scale systems, renaming the SDIO to the Ballistic Missile Defense Organization (BMDO).

In 2002, the George W. Bush administration in turn renamed the BMDO to the Missile Defense Agency (MDA), indicating plans for a layered missile defence system that integrates different types of defences, including sea- and ground-based defences.

== Ground-based programs ==
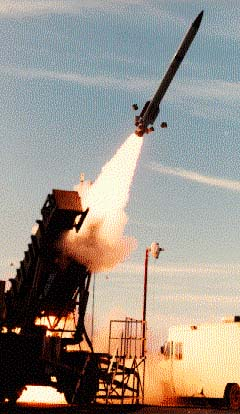
Extended Range Interceptor (ERINT) launch from White Sands Missile Range

=== Extended Range Interceptor (ERINT) ===
The Extended Range Interceptor (ERINT) program was part of SDI's Theater Missile Defense Program and was an extension of the Flexible Lightweight Agile Guided Experiment (FLAGE), which included developing hit-to-kill technology and demonstrating the guidance accuracy of a small, agile, radar-homing vehicle.

FLAGE scored a direct hit against a MGM-52 Lance missile in flight, at White Sands Missile Range in 1987. ERINT was a prototype missile similar to the FLAGE, but it used a new solid-propellant rocket motor that allowed it to fly faster and higher than FLAGE.

ERINT was later chosen as the MIM-104 Patriot (Patriot Advanced Capability-3, PAC-3) missile.

=== Homing Overlay Experiment (HOE) ===
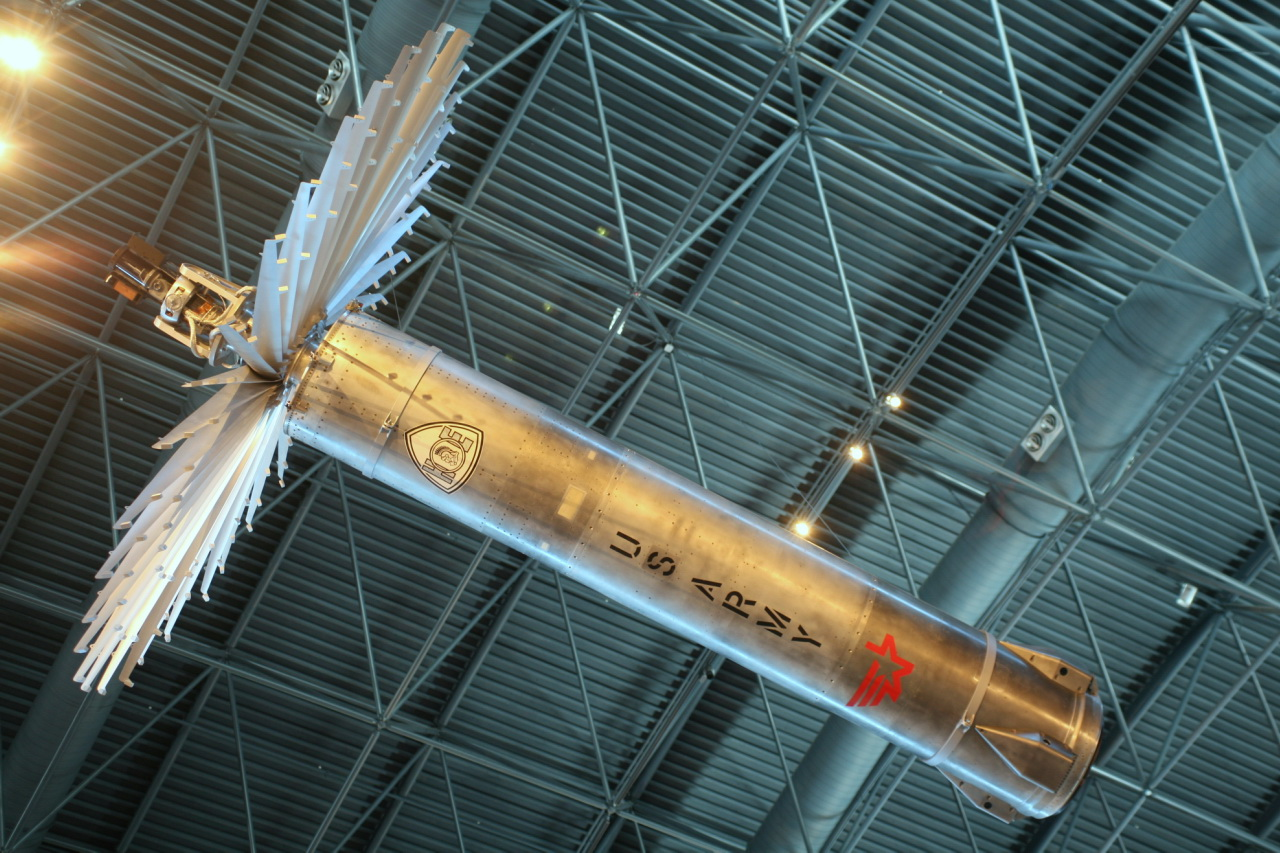
13 ft (4 m) diameter web deployed by Homing Overlay Experiment

Given concerns about previous programs' nuclear-tipped interceptors, in the 1980s the US Army began studies about the feasibility of kinetic hit-to-kill vehicles, i.e. interceptors that would destroy incoming ballistic missiles by colliding with them.

The Homing Overlay Experiment (HOE) was the first such system tested by the Army, and the first successful hit-to-kill intercept of a mock ballistic missile warhead outside the Earth's atmosphere.

HOE used a kinetic kill vehicle (KKV). The KKV was equipped with an infrared seeker, guidance electronics and a propulsion system. Once in space, the KKV could extend a folded structure similar to an umbrella skeleton of 13 ft (4 m) diameter to enhance its effective cross section. This device was intended to destroy an ICBM reentry vehicle on collision.

Four test launches were conducted in 1983 and 1984 at Kwajalein Missile Range in the Marshall Islands using first two stages of Minuteman missile, M55E1 and M56A1. For each test a Minuteman missile was launched from Vandenberg Air Force Base in California carrying a single mock re-entry vehicle targeted for Kwajalein lagoon more than 4,000 miles (6,400 km) away.

After test failures with the first three flight tests because of guidance and sensor problems, the DOD reported that the fourth and final test on June 10, 1984, was successful, intercepting the Minuteman RV with a closing speed of about 3.8 mi/s (6.1 km/s) at an altitude of more than 100 mi (160 km).

Although the fourth test was described as a success, the New York Times in August 1993 reported that the HOE4 test was rigged to increase the likelihood of success. At the urging of Senator David Pryor, the General Accounting Office investigated the claims and concluded that though steps were taken to make it easier for the interceptor to find its target (including some of those alleged by the New York Times), the available data indicated that the interceptor had been successfully guided by its onboard infrared sensors in the collision, and not by an onboard radar guidance system as alleged. Per the GAO report, the net effect of the DOD enhancements increased the infrared signature of the target vessel by 110% over the realistic missile signature initially proposed for the HOE program, but nonetheless the GAO concluded the enhancements to the target vessel were reasonable given the objectives of the program and the geopolitical consequences of its failure. Further, the report concluded that the DOD's subsequent statements before Congress about the HOE program "fairly characterize[d]" the success of HOE4, but confirmed that the DOD never disclosed to Congress the enhancements made to the target vessel.

HOE technology was later expanded into the Exoatmospheric Reentry-vehicle Interception System program.

=== ERIS and HEDI ===
Developed by Lockheed as part of the ground-based interceptor portion of SDI, the Exoatmospheric Reentry-vehicle Interceptor Subsystem (ERIS) began in 1985, with at least two tests occurring in the early 1990s. This system was never deployed, but its technology was used in the Terminal High Altitude Area Defense (THAAD) system and the Ground-Based Interceptor currently deployed as part of the Ground-Based Midcourse Defense (GMD) system.

== Directed-energy weapon (DEW) programs ==
=== X-ray laser ===
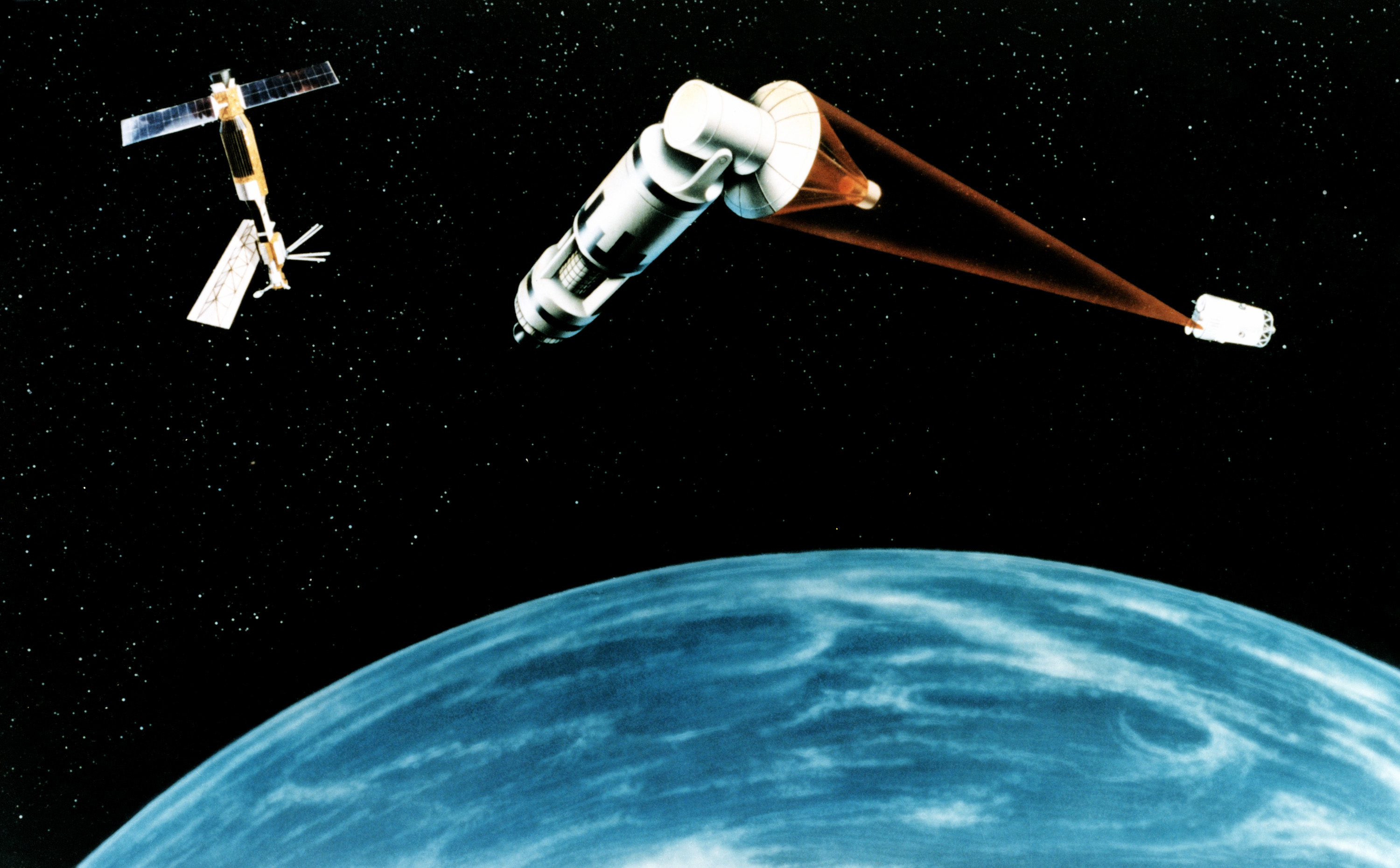
The 1984 SDI concept of a space based Nuclear reactor pumped laser or a chemical hydrogen fluoride laser satellite resulted in this 1984 artist's concept of a laser-equipped satellite firing on another, causing a momentum change in the target object by laser ablation, before having to cool and re-aim at further possible targets.

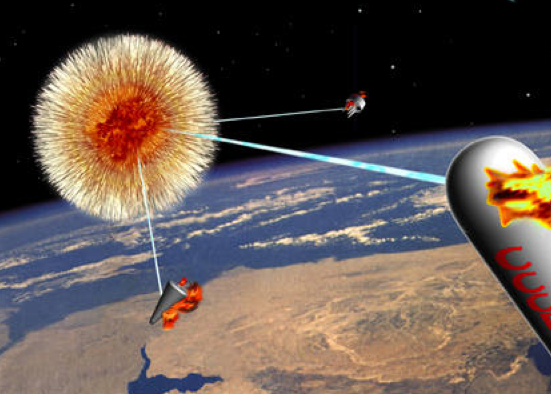
This early artwork of the nuclear detonation pumped laser array depicts an Excalibur engaging three targets simultaneously. In most descriptions, each Excalibur could fire at dozens of targets, which would be hundreds or thousands of miles away.

An early SDI focus was an X-ray laser powered by nuclear explosions. Nuclear explosions give off a burst of X-rays, which the Excalibur concept intended to focus using a lasing medium consisting of metal rods. Many such rods would be placed around a warhead, each aimed at a different ICBM, thus destroying many ICBMs in a single attack. It would cost much less for the US to build another Excalibur than the Soviets would need to build enough new ICBMs to counter it. The idea was first based on satellites, but when it was pointed out that these could be attacked in space, the concept moved to a "pop-up" concept, with the device launched from a submarine off the northern Soviet coast.

However, on March 26, 1983, the first test (known as the Cabra event), was performed in an underground shaft and resulted in marginally positive readings possibly caused by a faulty detector. Since a nuclear explosion was used as the power source, the detector was destroyed during the experiment, and the results therefore could not be confirmed. Technical criticism based upon unclassified calculations suggested that the X-ray laser would be of at best marginal use. Critics often cite the X-ray laser system as SDI's primary focus, with its apparent failure warranting opposition to the program.

Despite the apparent failure, the legacy of the X-ray laser program is the knowledge gained from the research. A parallel development program advanced laboratory X-ray lasers for biological imaging such as 3D holograms of living organisms. Other spin-offs include research on advanced materials like SEAgel and Aerogel, the Electron-Beam Ion Trap facility for physics research, and techniques for early detection of breast cancer.

=== Chemical laser ===
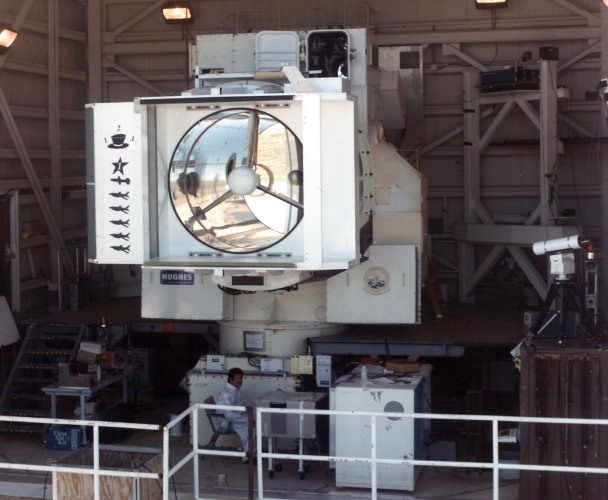
SeaLite Beam Director, commonly used as the output for the MIRACL

Beginning in 1985, the Air Force tested an SDIO-funded deuterium fluoride laser known as Mid-Infrared Advanced Chemical Laser (MIRACL) at White Sands Missile Range. During a simulation, the laser successfully destroyed a Titan missile booster in 1985. However, the test setup had the booster shell pressurized and under considerable compression loads. These test conditions were used to simulate the loads a booster would be under during launch. The system was later tested for the US Navy on target drones simulating cruise missiles, with some success. After SDIO closed, MIRACL was tested on an old Air Force satellite for potential use as an anti-satellite weapon, with mixed results. The technology was also used to develop the Tactical High Energy Laser (THEL) that was tested against in-flight artillery shells.

During the mid-to-late 1980s panel discussions took place at various laser conferences. Proceedings include papers on the status of chemical and other high-power lasers.

The Missile Defense Agency's Airborne Laser program used a chemical laser that intercepted a missile taking off, so an offshoot of SDI could be said to have successfully implemented one of the key goals of the program.

=== Neutral particle beam ===
In July 1989, the Beam Experiments Aboard a Rocket (BEAR) program launched a sounding rocket containing a neutral particle beam (NPB) accelerator. The experiment successfully demonstrated that a particle beam would operate and propagate as predicted outside the atmosphere and that no unexpected side-effects emerged when firing the beam in space. After the rocket was recovered, the particle beam was still operational. According to BMDO, the research on neutral particle beam accelerators, originally funded by SDIO, could eventually be used to reduce the half-life of nuclear waste products using accelerator-driven transmutation technology.

=== Laser and mirror experiments ===
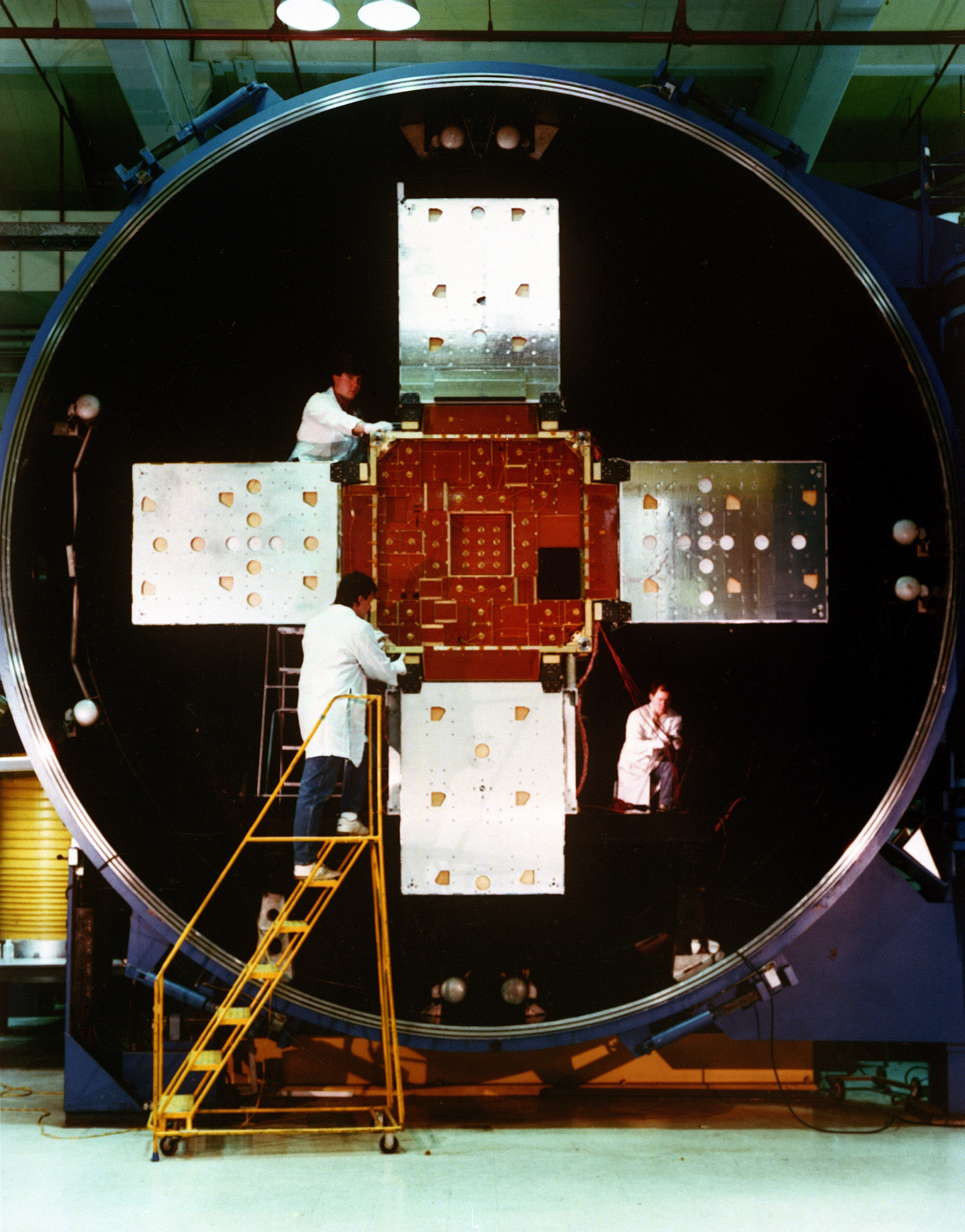
Technicians at the Naval Research Laboratory (NRL) work on the Low-Power Atmospheric Compensation Experiment (LACE) satellite.

The High Precision Tracking Experiment (HPTE), launched with the Space Shuttle Discovery on STS-51-G, was tested on June 21, 1985, when a Hawaii-based low-power laser successfully tracked the experiment and bounced the laser off of the HPTE mirror.

The Relay mirror experiment (RME), launched in February 1990, demonstrated critical technologies for space-based relay mirrors that would be used with an SDI directed-energy weapon system. The experiment validated stabilization, tracking, and pointing concepts and proved that a laser could be relayed from the ground to a 24 in (60 cm) mirror on an orbiting satellite and back to another ground station with a high degree of accuracy and for extended durations.

Launched on the same rocket as the RME, the Low-power Atmospheric Compensation Experiment (LACE) satellite was built by the United States Naval Research Laboratory (NRL) to explore atmospheric distortion of lasers and real-time adaptive compensation. The LACE satellite included several other experiments to help develop and improve SDI sensors, including target discrimination using background radiation and tracking ballistic missiles using Ultraviolet Plume Imaging (UVPI). LACE was also used to evaluate ground-based adaptive optics, a technique now used in civilian telescopes to remove atmospheric distortions.

=== Hypervelocity Railgun (CHECMATE) ===
Research on hypervelocity railgun technology was conducted to build an information base about railguns. The SDI railgun investigation, called the Compact High Energy Capacitor Module Advanced Technology Experiment, was able to fire two projectiles per day during the initiative. This represented a significant improvement over previous efforts, which were only able to achieve about one shot per month. Hypervelocity railguns are, at least conceptually, an attractive alternative to a space-based defense system because of their envisioned ability to quickly shoot at many targets. Also, since only the projectile leaves the gun, a railgun system can potentially fire many times before needing to be resupplied.

A hypervelocity railgun works like a particle accelerator, converting electrical potential energy into kinetic energy for the projectile. A conductive pellet (the projectile) is attracted down the rails by electric current flowing through a rail. Through magnetic forces, a force is exerted on the projectile moving it down the rail. Railguns can generate muzzle-velocities in excess of 1.5 miles per second (2.4 km/s).

Railguns face a host of technical challenges to be ready for battlefield deployment. First, the rails guiding the projectile must carry sufficient power. Each firing of the railgun sends tremendous current flow (almost half a million amperes) through the rails, causing rapid erosion of the rail's surfaces (through ohmic heating), and even vaporization of the rail surface. Early prototypes were essentially single-use weapons, requiring complete rail replacement after each firing. Another challenge is projectile survivability. The projectiles experience acceleration force in excess of 100,000 g. To be effective, the fired projectile must first survive the mechanical stress of firing and the thermal effects of a trip through the atmosphere at many times the speed of sound before hitting its target. Any on-board guidance would require the onboard navigation system to be built to the same level of sturdiness as the main mass of the projectile.

In addition to destroying ballistic missile threats, railguns were also planned for service in space platform (sensor and battle station) defense. This potential role reflected defense planner expectations that future railguns would be capable of rapid fire and on the order of tens to hundreds of shots.

== Space-based programs ==
=== Space-Based Interceptor ===
The Space-Based Interceptor (SBI) concept involved groups of interceptors housed in orbital modules. Hover testing was completed in 1988 and demonstrated integration of the sensor and propulsion systems. It demonstrated the ability of the seeker to shift its aiming point from a rocket's hot plume to its cool body, a first for infrared ABM seekers. Final hover testing occurred in 1992 using miniaturized components similar to those that would have been used in an operational interceptor. These prototypes eventually evolved into Brilliant Pebbles.

=== Brilliant Pebbles ===
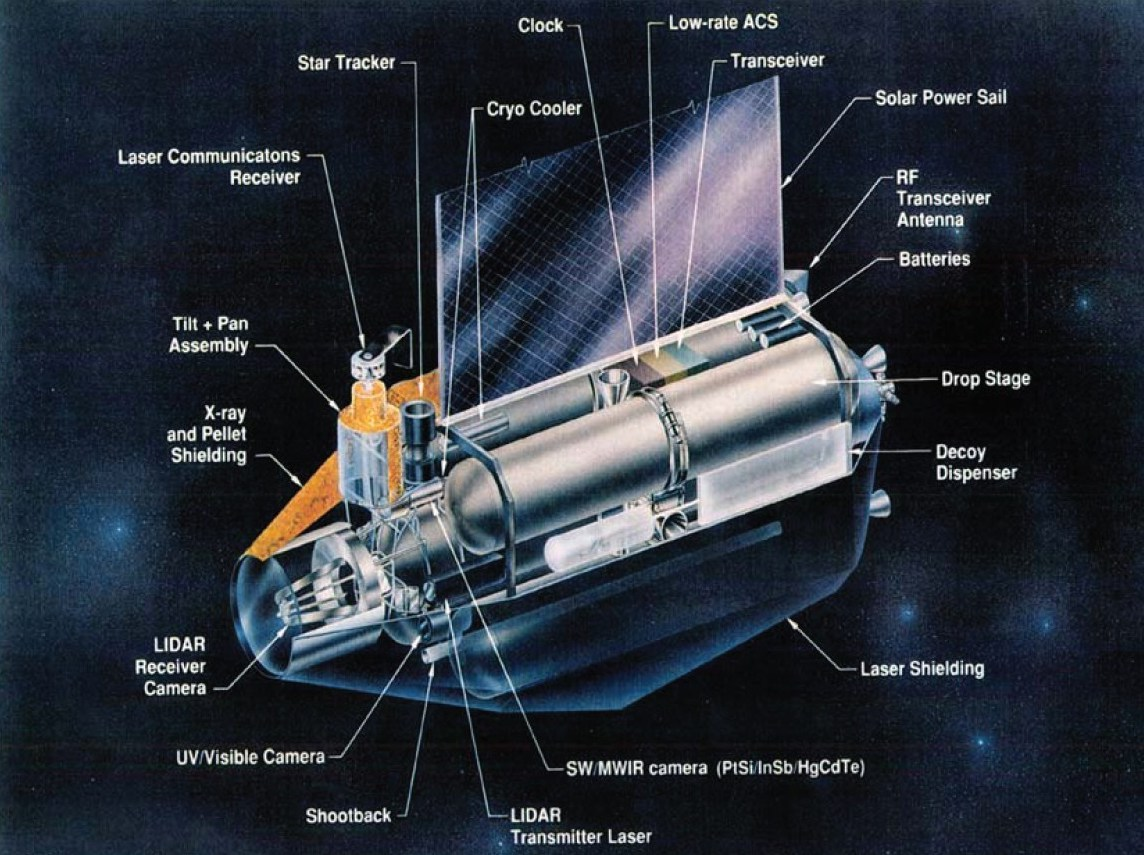
Brilliant Pebbles concept diagram

Brilliant Pebbles was a non-nuclear system of numerous small satellites with heat-seeking missiles to intercept ICBMs. It was designed to operate in conjunction with the Brilliant Eyes sensor system. The project was conceived in 1986 by Lowell Wood and Edward Teller. Detailed studies were undertaken by several advisory boards, including the Defense Science Board and JASON, in 1989.

The Pebbles were designed so that autonomous operation was possible without external guidance from planned SDI sensor systems. This was attractive as a cost saving measure, as it would allow scaling back of those systems, and was estimated to save $7 to $13 billion versus the standard Phase I Architecture. Brilliant Pebbles later became the centerpiece under the Bush Administration.

John H. Nuckolls, LLNL director from 1988 to 1994, described the system as "The crowning achievement of the Strategic Defense Initiative". The sensors and cameras developed for Brilliant Pebbles systems became components of the Clementine mission.

Though regarded as one of the most capable SDI systems, Brilliant Pebbles was canceled in 1994 by BMDO.

== Sensor programs ==
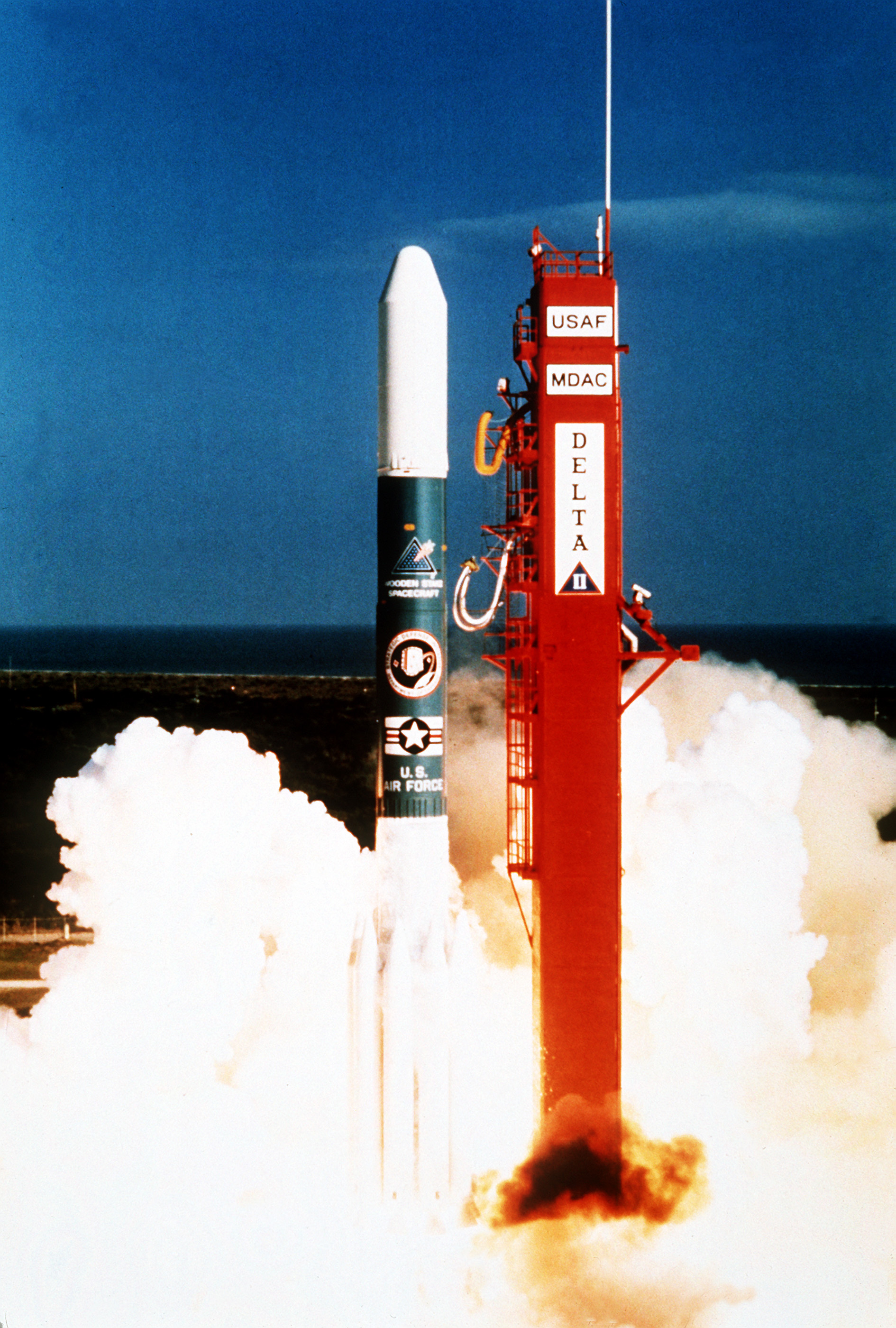
Delta 183 launch vehicle lifts off, carrying the SDI sensor experiment "Delta Star", March 24, 1989

SDIO sensor research encompassed visible light, ultraviolet, infrared, and radar technologies, and eventually led to the Clementine mission though that mission occurred just after the program transitioned to the BMDO. Like other parts of SDI, the sensor system initially was very large-scale, but after the Soviet threat diminished it was cut back.

=== Boost Surveillance and Tracking System ===
Boost Surveillance and Tracking System (BSTS) was part of SDIO in the late 1980s, and was designed to detect missile launches, especially during the boost phase; however, once the SDI program shifted toward theater missile defense in the early 1990s, the system left SDIO control and was transferred to the Air Force.

=== Space Surveillance and Tracking System ===
Space Surveillance and Tracking System (SSTS) was a system originally designed for tracking mid-course ballistic missiles. It was designed to work in conjunction with BSTS but was later scaled down in favor of Brilliant Eyes.

=== Brilliant Eyes ===
Brilliant Eyes was a simpler derivative of SSTS that focused on theater ballistic missiles rather than ICBMs and was meant to operate in conjunction with Brilliant Pebbles.

Brilliant Eyes was renamed Space and Missile Tracking System (SMTS) and scaled back further under BMDO, and in the late 1990s it became the low earth orbit component of the Air Force's Space Based Infrared System (SBIRS).

=== Other sensor experiments ===
The Delta 183 program used a satellite known as Delta Star to test sensor-related technologies. Delta Star carried a thermographic camera, a long-wave infrared imager, an ensemble of imagers and photometers covering several visible and ultraviolet bands as well as a laser detector and ranging device. The satellite observed several ballistic missile launches including some releasing liquid propellant as a detection countermeasure.

== Countermeasures ==
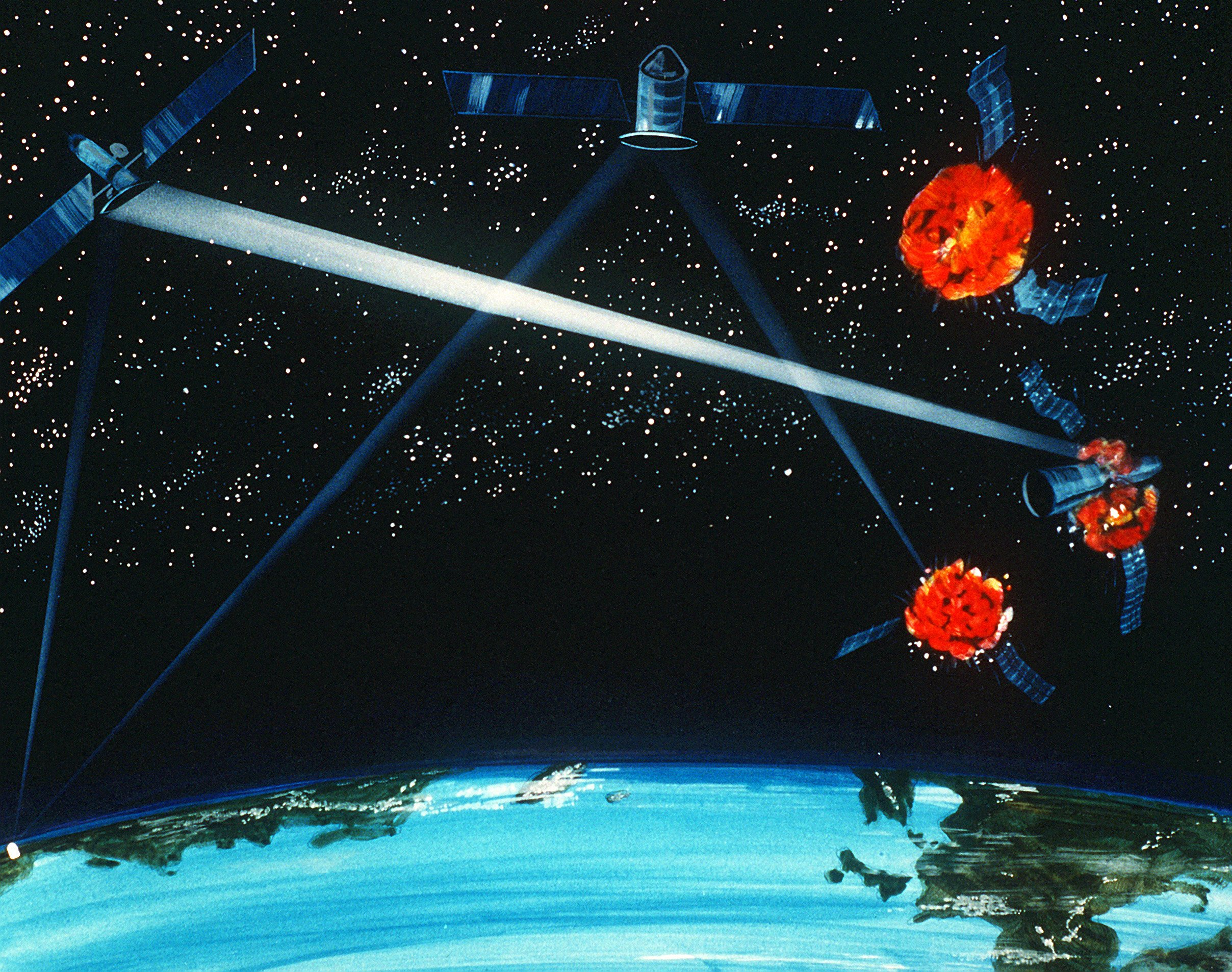
An artist's concept of a ground / space-based hybrid laser weapon, 1984

In war-fighting, countermeasures encompass multiple meanings:

- Immediate tactical action to reduce vulnerability, such as chaff, decoys, and maneuvering
- Counter strategies that exploit a weakness of an opposing system, such as adding more warheads that are less expensive than the interceptors fired against them.
- Defense suppression - that is, attacking elements of the defensive system.

Countermeasures have long been a key part of warfighting strategy; however, with SDI they attained a special prominence due to the system cost, scenario of a massive sophisticated attack, strategic consequences of a less-than-perfect defense, basing many proposed weapons systems in space, and political debate.

Whereas the United States national missile defense system targets a relatively limited and unsophisticated attack, SDI planned for a massive attack by a sophisticated opponent. This raised significant issues about economic and technical costs associated with defending against anti-ballistic missile defense countermeasures used by the attacking side.

For example, if it had been much cheaper to add attacking warheads than to add defenses, an attacker of similar economic power could have simply outproduced the defender. The "cost effective at the margin" requirement was first formulated by Paul Nitze in November 1985.

In addition, SDI envisioned many space-based systems in fixed orbits, ground-based sensors, command, control and communications facilities, etc. In theory, an advanced opponent could have targeted those, in turn requiring self-defense capability or increased numbers to compensate for attrition.

A sophisticated attacker having the technology to use decoys, shielding, maneuvering warheads, defense suppression, or other countermeasures would have multiplied the difficulty and cost of intercepting the real warheads. SDI design and operational planning had to factor in these countermeasures and the associated cost.

== Response from the Soviet Union ==
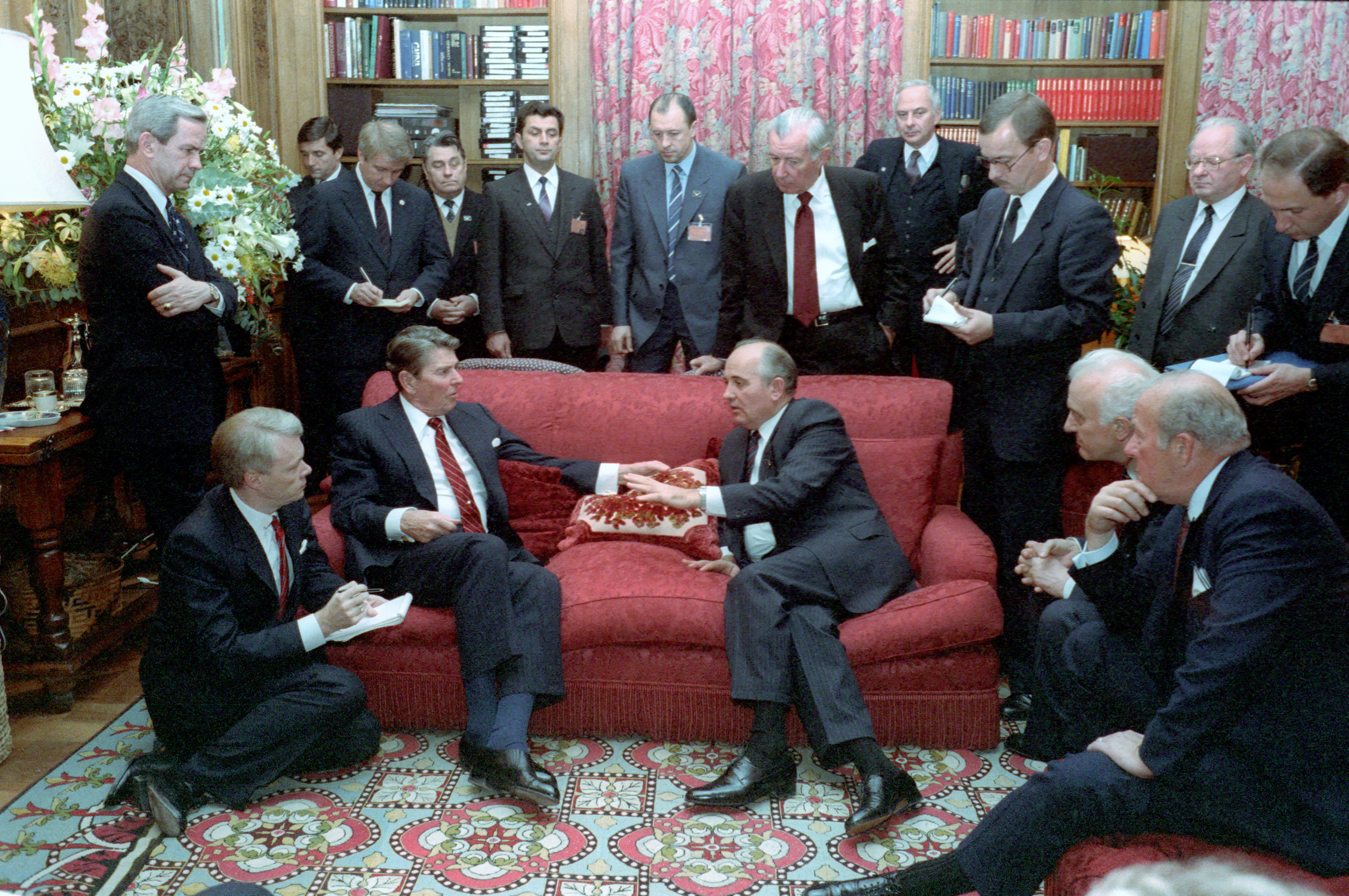
SDI was high on Mikhail Gorbachev's agenda at the Geneva Summit.

SDI failed to dissuade the USSR from investing in development of ballistic missiles. The Soviet response to SDI from March 1983 through November 1985 provided indications of their view of the program both as a threat and as an opportunity to weaken NATO. SDI was likely seen not only as a threat to the physical security of the Soviet Union, but also as part of a larger effort by the United States to seize the strategic initiative in arms control by neutralizing the military component of Soviet strategy. The Kremlin expressed concerns that space-based missile defenses would make nuclear war inevitable.

A major objective of that strategy was the political separation of Western Europe from the United States, which the Soviets sought to facilitate by aggravating allied concern over the SDI's potential implications for European security and economic interests. The Soviet predisposition to see deception behind SDI was reinforced by their assessment of US intentions and capabilities and the utility of military deception in furthering the achievement of political goals.

Until the failing Soviet economy and the dissolution of the country between 1989 and 1991 which marks the end of the Cold War and with it the relaxation of the "arms race", warhead production had continued unabated in the USSR. Total deployed US and Soviet strategic weapons increased steadily from 1983 until the Cold War ended.

In 1986 Carl Sagan summarized what he heard Soviet commentators saying about SDI. They commonly expressed the notion that SDI was equivalent to starting an economic war through a defensive arms race to further cripple the Soviet economy with extra military spending. Another common Soviet perception suggested that SDI served as a disguise for a US desire to initiate a first strike on the Soviet Union.

Though classified at the time, a detailed study on a Soviet space-based LASER system began no later than 1976 as the Skif, a 1 MW carbon dioxide laser along with the anti-satellite Kaskad, an in-orbit missile platform. The devices were reportedly designed to pre-emptively destroy US satellites that might be launched in the future that could otherwise aid US missile defense.

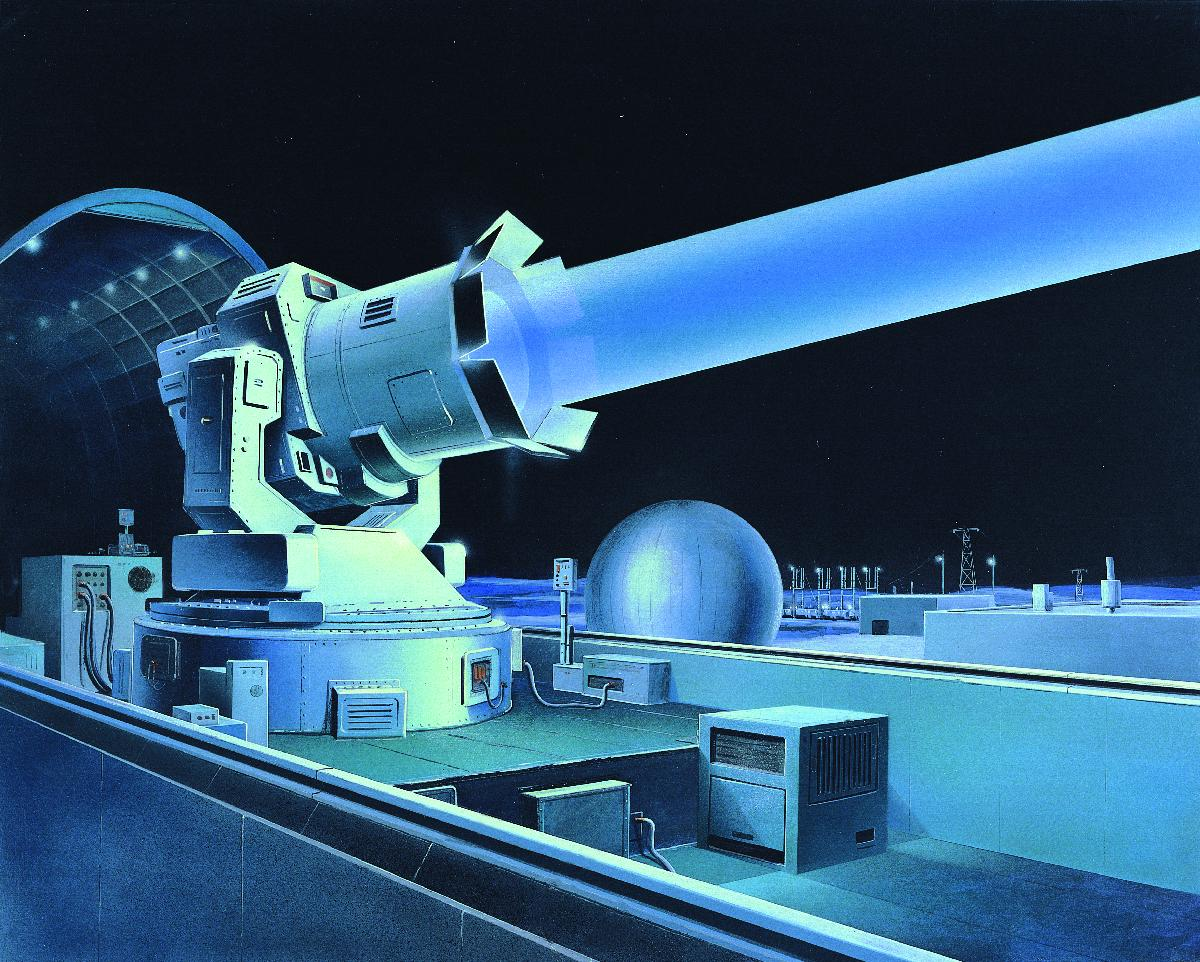
DIA drawing of the Soviet Terra-3 laser in the USSR

Terra-3 was a Soviet laser testing centre, located on the Sary Shagan anti-ballistic missile (ABM) testing range in the Karaganda Region of Kazakhstan. It was originally built to test missile defense concepts. In 1984, officials within the United States Department of Defense (DoD) suggested it was the site of a prototypical anti-satellite weapon system.

In 1987 a disguised Mir space station module was lifted on the inaugural flight of the Energia booster as the Polyus. It was later revealed that this craft housed a number of Skif lasers, intended to be clandestinely tested in orbit. However, the spacecraft's attitude control system malfunctioned upon separation from the booster, and it failed to reach orbit. More tentatively, it is also suggested that the Zarya module of the International Space Station, capable of station keeping and providing sizable battery power, was initially developed to power the Skif laser system.

The Polyus was a prototype of the Skif orbital weapons platform designed to destroy satellites with a megawatt carbon-dioxide laser. Soviet motivations behind attempting to launch components of the Skif laser in the form of Polyus were, according to interviews conducted years later, more for propaganda purposes in the prevailing climate of focus on US SDI, than as an effective defense technology, as the phrase "Space based laser" has political capital.

== Post-Soviet ==
In 2014, a declassified CIA paper stated that "In response to SDI, Moscow threatened a variety of military countermeasures in lieu of developing a parallel missile defense system".

In January 2025 President Donald Trump ordered the building of a national "Iron Dome" missile defense shield.

== Controversy and criticism ==
Jessica Savitch reported on the technology in episode No.111 of Frontline, "Space: The Race for High Ground", on November 4, 1983. The opening sequence shows Jessica Savitch seated next to a laser that she used to destroy a model of a communication satellite. The demonstration was perhaps the first televised use of a weapons-grade laser. No theatrical effects were used. The model was actually destroyed by the heat from the laser. The model and the laser were realized by Marc Palumbo, a High Tech Romantic artist from the Center for Advanced Visual Studies at MIT.

Ashton Carter, then a board member at MIT, assessed SDI for Congress in 1984, noting difficulties in creating an adequate missile defense shield, with or without lasers. Carter said X-rays had a limited scope because they become diffused by the atmosphere, much like the beam of a flashlight spreading outward in all directions. This means the X-ray sources needed to be close to the Soviet Union, especially during the boost phase, for the Soviet missiles to be both detectable to radar and targeted by the lasers. Opponents disagreed, saying advances in technology, such as using stronger beams, and by "bleaching" the column of air surrounding the laser beam, could increase the distance that the X-ray could travel to successfully hit its target.

Physicists Hans Bethe and Richard Garwin, who worked with Teller on both the atomic bomb and hydrogen bomb at Los Alamos, claimed a laser defense shield was unfeasible. They said that a defensive system was costly and difficult to build yet simple to destroy and claimed that the Soviets could easily use thousands of decoys to overwhelm it during a nuclear attack. They dismissed the idea of a technical solution to the Cold War, saying that a defense shield could be viewed as threatening because it would inhibit Soviet offensive capabilities while leaving America's offense intact. In March 1984, Bethe coauthored a 106-page report for the Union of Concerned Scientists that concluded "the X-ray laser offers no prospect of being a useful component in a system for ballistic missile defense."

In response, when Teller testified before Congress he stated that "instead of [Bethe] objecting on scientific and technical grounds, which he thoroughly understands, he now objects on the grounds of politics, on grounds of military feasibility of military deployment, on other grounds of difficult issues which are quite outside the range of his professional cognizance or mine."

On June 28, 1985, David Lorge Parnas resigned from SDIO's Panel on Computing in Support of Battle Management, arguing in eight short papers that the SDI software could never be made trustworthy and that such a system would inevitably be unreliable and menace humanity in its own right. Parnas said he joined the panel with the desire to make nuclear weapons "impotent and obsolete" but soon concluded that the concept was "a fraud".

=== The nickname "Star Wars" ===
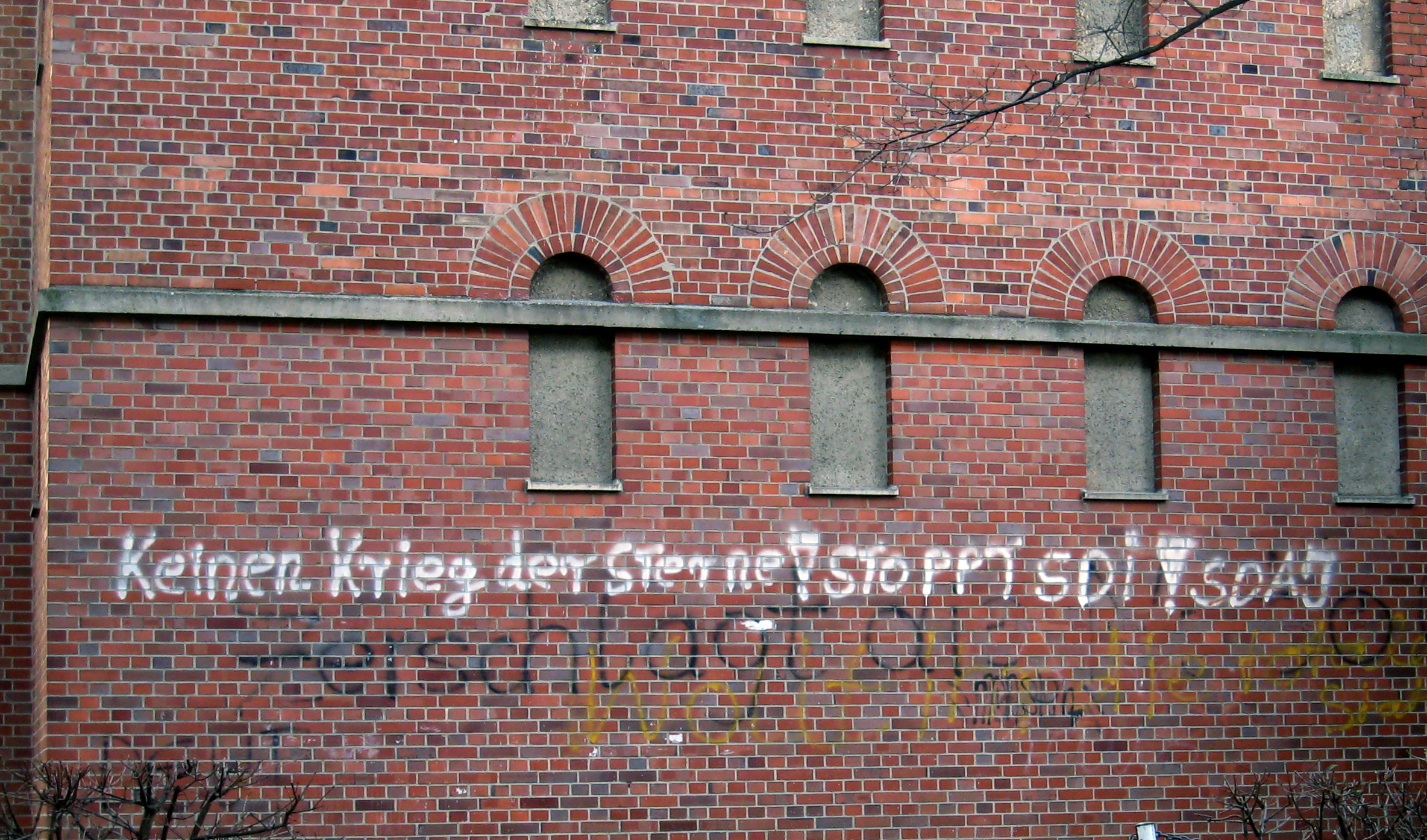
SDI drew criticism from abroad as well. This 1986 Socialist German Workers Youth graffiti in Kassel, West Germany, says "Keinen Krieg der Sterne! Stoppt SDI! SDAJ" (No star wars! Stop SDI! SDAJ).

Historians from the Missile Defense Agency attribute the term "Star Wars" to a Washington Post article published March 24, 1983. It quoted a speech delivered by Democratic Senator Ted Kennedy the previous day, describing the proposal as "reckless Star Wars schemes", a reference to the space opera film series Star Wars. Some critics used the term derisively, implying it was an impractical science fiction. In addition, the American media's liberal use of the moniker (despite President Reagan's request) did much to damage the program's credibility. In comments to the media on March 7, 1986, SDIO Acting Deputy Director Dr. Gerold Yonas described "Star Wars" as an important tool for Soviet disinformation and asserted that the nickname gave an entirely wrong impression of SDI.

Supporters of the SDI program eventually began to use the nickname as well. George Lucas, the creator of the Star Wars franchise, sued public interest groups High Frontier (a liberal organization that supported the program) and Committee for a Strong, Peaceful America (a conservative organization) in 1985 for trademark infringement. The lawsuit was dismissed by Judge Gerhard Gesell, who ruled that political application of the term was a non-commercial usage outside of the scope of trademark.

=== Treaty obligations ===
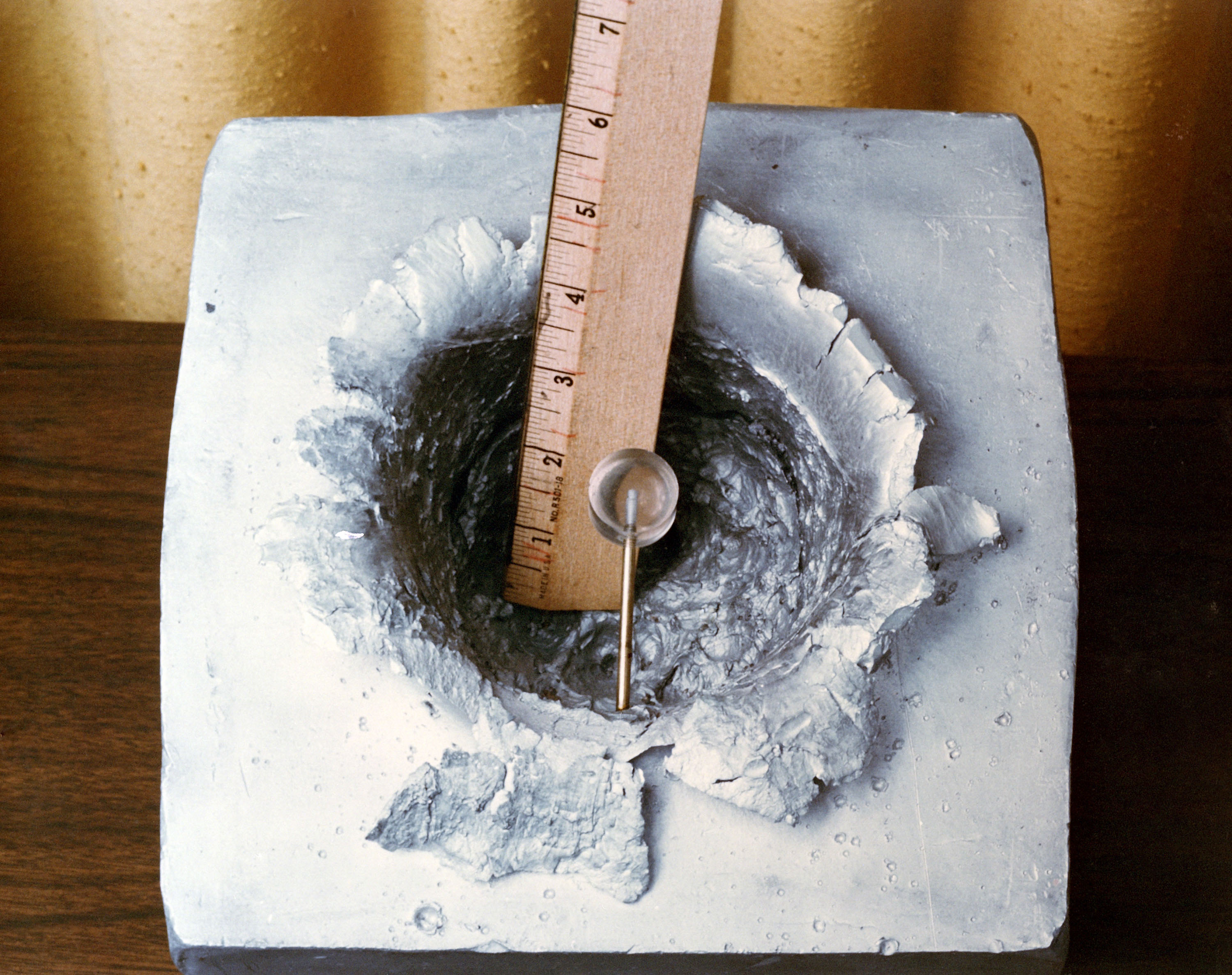
SDI was not just lasers; in this kinetic energy weapon test, a 0.25-ounce (7 g) Lexan projectile was fired from a light-gas gun at a velocity of 23,000 feet per second (7,000 m/s; 16,000 mph) at a cast aluminum block.

Another criticism of SDI argued that it would be inconsistent with existing treaties. The Anti-Ballistic Missile Treaty and its subsequent protocol, which limited missile defenses to one location per country at 100 missiles each (which the USSR had and the US did not), would have been violated by SDI ground-based interceptors. The Nuclear Non-Proliferation Treaty requires that "Each of the Parties to the Treaty undertakes to pursue negotiations in good faith on effective measures relating to cessation of the nuclear arms race at an early date and to nuclear disarmament, and on a treaty on general and complete disarmament under strict and effective international control." Many viewed deployment of ABM systems as an escalation, and therefore a violation of this clause, although this view was not universal.

The Outer Space Treaty of 1967 required "States Party to the Treaty undertake not to place in orbit around the Earth any objects carrying nuclear weapons or any other kinds of weapons of mass destruction, install such weapons on celestial bodies, or station such weapons in outer space in any other manner." This clause forbade the US from pre-positioning in Earth orbit any devices powered by nuclear weapons and any devices capable of "mass destruction". A space-stationed nuclear-pumped X-ray laser would have violated this treaty, since other SDI systems did not require the pre-positioning of nuclear explosives in space.

=== Mutual assured destruction ===
SDI threatened to disrupt the strategic equilibrium ensured by the doctrine of mutual assured destruction (MAD). This doctrine postulated that neither the U.S. nor the USSR could attack the other without considering the strong probability that both sides would be annihilated. A defensive weapon system that could neutralize much of an adversary's nuclear counter-strike force would potentially embolden the possessor to strike first.

During the Reykjavík talks with Mikhail Gorbachev in 1986, Reagan addressed Gorbachev's concerns about imbalance by stating that SDI technology could be provided to the entire world – including the Soviet Union – to prevent the imbalance from occurring. Gorbachev answered dismissively. When Reagan proposed technology sharing again, Gorbachev stated "we cannot assume an obligation relative to such a transition", referring to the cost of implementing such a program.

=== Whistleblower ===
In 1992, scientist Aldric Saucier was given whistleblower protection after he was fired and complained about "wasteful spending on research and development" at SDI. Saucier lost his security clearance.

== See also ==
- Anti-ballistic missile
- Anti-satellite weapons
- Ballistic Missile Defense Organization (BMDO)
- Comparison of anti-ballistic missile systems
- Directed-energy weapons
  - Zenith Star
- Ground-Based Midcourse Defense (GMD)
- Golden Dome (missile defense system)
- International Conference of Laser Applications
- Militarization of space
- Missile Defense Agency (MDA)
- Missile defense systems by country
- Polyus (spacecraft)
- Rockwell X-30 – partly funded by the SDIO
- THAAD missile defense system
- United States national missile defense
- United States Space Force
