= Zenith Star =

Proposed space-based weapon system

Zenith Star was a Directed-energy weapon that started development as part of the US Strategic Defense Initiative.

It included the Alpha laser, a high energy hydrogen fluoride chemical laser, and the LAMP mirror which was a 7 segment adaptive optics mirror.

Zenith Star was never put in orbit, but the Alpha LAMP Integration (ALI) project carried out some ground-based tests.

== History ==
The Zenith Star program was a key component of President Ronald Reagan's Strategic Defense Initiative (SDI), popularly known as "Star Wars," which aimed to create a space-based ballistic missile defense system. Initiated in the mid-1980s, Zenith Star represented an ambitious attempt to develop and deploy a chemical laser weapon in space.

Following SDI's establishment in 1984, the office took over directed-energy weapons research from DARPA. By 1986, with more exotic technologies like nuclear X-ray lasers still far from realization, the chemical laser became the focus for near-term deployment. In December 1986, President Reagan made a secret decision to accelerate the program, aiming for a space-based test of Zenith Star by 1990, four years earlier than originally planned.

The Zenith Star spacecraft as designed was massive, measuring 80 feet long and over 40 feet in diameter, with a weight exceeding 43 tons. It incorporated TRW's "Alpha chemical laser", a large focusing mirror, and advanced targeting systems. Construction was managed by Lockheed Martin Missiles & Space Company. Despite its presidential support and very large budget, the program faced significant technical challenges, schedule delays, and funding issues. By 1989, every component was at least a year behind schedule. The end of the Cold War ultimately led to the program's apparent cancellation in the early 1990s, yet it laid the groundwork for subsequent directed-energy weapons research.

== Legacy ==
Around 1998 Space-Based lasers were reconsidered and led to the Space Based Laser - Integrated Flight eXperiment (SBL-IFX) project 2000–2002.

== See also ==
- Project Excalibur – Anti-missile system using an X-ray laser powered by a nuclear bomb
