= Chemical laser =

Laser that obtains energy from chemical reactions

A chemical laser is a laser that obtains its energy from a chemical reaction. Chemical lasers can reach continuous wave output with power reaching to megawatt levels. They are used in industry for cutting and drilling.

Common examples of chemical lasers are the chemical oxygen iodine laser (COIL), all gas-phase iodine laser (AGIL), and the hydrogen fluoride (HF) and deuterium fluoride (DF) lasers, all operating in the mid-infrared region. There is also a DF–CO_{2} laser (deuterium fluoride–carbon dioxide), which, like COIL, is a "transfer laser." The HF and DF lasers are unusual, in that there are several molecular energy transitions with sufficient energy to cross the threshold required for lasing. Since the molecules do not collide frequently enough to re-distribute the energy, several of these laser modes operate either simultaneously, or in extremely rapid succession, so that an HF or DF laser appears to operate simultaneously on several wavelengths unless a wavelength selection device is incorporated into the resonator.

== Origin of the CW chemical HF/DF laser ==
The possibility of the creation of infrared lasers based on the vibrationally excited products of a chemical reaction was first proposed by John Polanyi in 1961. A pulsed chemical laser was demonstrated by Jerome V. V. Kasper and George C. Pimentel in 1965. First, chlorine (Cl_{2}) was vigorously photo-disassociated into atoms, which then reacted with hydrogen, yielding hydrogen chloride (HCl) in an excited state suitable for a laser. Then hydrogen fluoride (HF) and deuterium fluoride (DF) were demonstrated. Pimentel went on to explore a DF-CO_{2} transfer laser. Although this work did not produce a purely chemical continuous wave laser, it paved the way by showing the viability of the chemical reaction as a pumping mechanism for a chemical laser.

The continuous wave (CW) chemical HF laser was first demonstrated in 1969, and patented in 1972, by D. J. Spencer, T. A. Jacobs, H. Mirels and R. W. F. Gross at The Aerospace Corporation in El Segundo, California. This device used the mixing of adjacent streams of H_{2} and F, within an optical cavity, to create vibrationally-excited HF that lased. The atomic fluorine was provided by dissociation of SF_{6} gas using a DC electrical discharge. Later work at US Army, US Air Force, and US Navy contractor organizations (e.g. TRW) used a chemical reaction to provide the atomic fluorine, a concept included in the patent disclosure of Spencer et al. The latter configuration obviated the need for electrical power and led to the development of high-power lasers for military applications.

The analysis of the HF laser performance is complicated due to the need to simultaneously consider the fluid dynamic mixing of adjacent supersonic streams, multiple non-equilibrium chemical reactions and the interaction of the gain medium with the optical cavity. The researchers at The Aerospace Corporation developed the first exact analytic (flame sheet) solution, the first numerical computer code solution and the first simplified model describing CW HF chemical laser performance.

Chemical lasers stimulated the use of wave-optics calculations for resonator analysis. This work was pioneered by E. A. Sziklas (Pratt & Whitney) and A. E. Siegman (Stanford University). Part I of their work dealt with Hermite-Gaussian Expansion and has received little use compared with Part II, which dealt with the Fast Fourier transform method, which is now a standard tool at United Technologies Corporation, Lockheed Martin, SAIC, Boeing, tOSC, MZA (Wave Train), and OPCI. Most of these companies competed for contracts to build HF and DF lasers for DARPA, the US Air Force, the US Army, or the US Navy throughout the 1970s and 1980s. General Electric and Pratt & Whitney dropped out of the competition in the early 1980s leaving the field to Rocketdyne (now part of Pratt & Whitney - although the laser organization remains today with Boeing) and TRW (now part of Northrop Grumman).

Comprehensive chemical laser models were developed at SAIC by R. C. Wade, at TRW by C.-C. Shih, by D. Bullock and M. E. Lainhart, and at Rocketdyne by D. A. Holmes and T. R. Waite. Of these, perhaps the most sophisticated was the CROQ code at TRW, outpacing the early work at Aerospace Corporation.

== Performance ==
The early analytical models coupled with chemical rate studies led to the design of efficient experimental CW HF laser devices at United Aircraft, and The Aerospace Corporation. Power levels up to 10 kW were achieved. DF lasing was obtained by the substitution of D_{2} for H_{2}. A group at United Aircraft Research Laboratories produced a re-circulating chemical laser, which did not rely on the continuous consumption of chemical reactants.

The TRW Systems Group in Redondo Beach, California, subsequently received US Air Force contracts to build higher power CW HF/DF lasers. Using a scaled-up version of an Aerospace Corporation design, TRW achieved 100 kW power levels. General Electric, Pratt & Whitney, & Rocketdyne built various chemical lasers on company funds in anticipation of receiving DoD contracts to build even larger lasers. Only Rocketdyne received contracts of sufficient value to continue competing with TRW. TRW produced the MIRACL device for the U.S. Navy that achieved megawatt power levels. The latter is believed to be the highest power continuous laser, of any type, developed to date (2007).

TRW also produced a cylindrical chemical laser (the Alpha laser) for DARPA Zenith Star, which had the theoretical advantage of being scalable to even larger powers. However, by 1990, the interest in chemical lasers had shifted toward shorter wavelengths, and the chemical oxygen iodine laser (COIL) gained the most interest, producing radiation at 1.315 μm. There is a further advantage that the COIL laser generally produces single wavelength radiation, which is very helpful for forming a very well focused beam. This type of COIL laser is used today in the ABL (Airborne Laser, the laser itself being built by Northrop Grumman) and in the ATL (Advanced Tactical Laser) produced by Boeing. Meanwhile, a lower power HF laser was used for the THEL (Tactical High Energy Laser) built in the late 1990s for the Israeli Ministry of Defense in cooperation with the U.S. Army SMDC. It is the first fielded high energy laser to demonstrate effectiveness in fairly realistic tests against rockets and artillery. The MIRACL laser has demonstrated effectiveness against certain targets flown in front of it at White Sands Missile Range, but it is not configured for actual service as a fielded weapon. ABL was successful in shooting down several full sized missiles from significant ranges, and ATL was successful in disabling moving land vehicles and other tactical targets.

Despite the performance advantages of chemical lasers, the Department of Defense stopped all development of chemical laser systems with the termination of the Airborne Laser Testbed in 2012. The desire for a "renewable" power source, i.e. not having to supply unusual chemicals like fluorine, deuterium, basic hydrogen-peroxide, or iodine, led the DoD to push for electrically pumped lasers such as diode pumped alkali lasers (DPALS). An "Inside the Army" weekly report mentions "Directed Energy Master Plan"
