= MIRACL =

Directed energy weapon

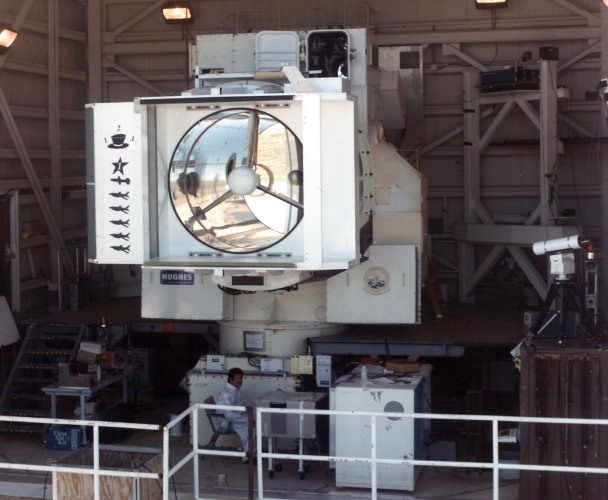
SeaLite Beam Director, commonly used as the output for the MIRACL.

MIRACL, or Mid-Infrared Advanced Chemical Laser, is a directed energy weapon developed by the US Navy. It is a deuterium fluoride laser, a type of chemical laser.

The MIRACL laser first became operational in 1980. It can produce over a megawatt of output for up to 70 seconds, making it the most powerful continuous wave (CW) laser in the US. Its original goal was to be able to track and destroy anti-ship cruise missiles, but in later years it was used to test phenomenologies associated with national anti-ballistic and anti-satellite laser weapons. Originally tested at a contractor facility in California, as of the later 1990s and early 2000s, it was located at the former MAR-1 facility in the White Sands Missile Range in New Mexico.

The beam size in the resonator is about 21 by 3 cm (8.3 by 1.2 in) wide. The beam is then reshaped to a 14 cm × 14 cm (5.5 in × 5.5 in) square.

Amid much controversy in October 1997, MIRACL was tested against MSTI-3, a US Air Force satellite at the end of its original mission in orbit at a distance of 432 km (268 mi). MIRACL failed during the test and was damaged and the Pentagon claimed mixed results for other portions of the test. A second, lower-powered chemical laser was able to temporarily blind the MSTI-3 sensors during the test.
