= Hydrogen fluoride laser =

Type of chemical laser

The hydrogen fluoride laser is an infrared chemical laser capable of delivering continuous output power in the megawatt range.

Hydrogen fluoride lasers operate at the wavelength of 2.7–2.9 μm. This wavelength is absorbed by the atmosphere, effectively attenuating the beam and reducing its reach, unless used in a vacuum environment. Deuterium fluoride lases at the wavelength of about 3.8 μm. This makes the deuterium fluoride laser usable for terrestrial operations.

== Deuterium fluoride laser ==
The deuterium fluoride laser constructionally resembles a rocket engine. In its combustion chamber, ethylene is burned in nitrogen trifluoride, producing free excited fluorine radicals. Just after the nozzle, a mixture of helium and either hydrogen or deuterium gas is injected to the exhaust stream. The hydrogen or deuterium reacts with the fluorine radicals, producing excited molecules of hydrogen fluoride or deuterium fluoride, respectively. The excited molecules then undergo stimulated emission in the optical resonator region of the laser.

Deuterium fluoride lasers have found military applications: the MIRACL laser, the pulsed energy projectile anti-personnel weapon, and the Tactical High Energy Laser are of the deuterium fluoride type.
