= Operation Julin =

Series of 1990s US nuclear tests

Julin
- Julin Divider (5 kt), the last nuclear weapons test by the United States.

Information
- Country: United States
- Test site: NTS Area 12, Rainier Mesa; NTS Area 19, 20, Pahute Mesa; NTS, Areas 1–4, 6–10, Yucca Flat
- Period: 1991–1992
- Number of tests: 7
- Test type: underground shaft, tunnel
- Max. yield: 100 kilotonnes of TNT (420 TJ)

Test series chronology

Operation Julin was a group of 7 nuclear tests conducted by the United States in 1991–1992. These tests (Note: A bomb test may be a salvo test, defined as two or more explosions "where a period of time between successive individual explosions does not exceed 5 seconds and where the burial points of all explosive devices can be connected by segments of straight lines, each of them connecting two burial points and does not exceed 40 kilometers in length". V. N. Mikhailov. Catalog of World Wide Nuclear Testing (Report). Begell-Atom, LLC. Archived from the original on April 26, 2014.) followed the Operation Sculpin series, and were the last before negotiations began for the Comprehensive Test Ban Treaty.

== Nuclear tests ==
=== Diamond Fortune ===
Shot Diamond Fortune was to investigate blast flow field produced by a modern nuclear weapon. The shot was fired in a half-spherical cavity with an 11-metre (36 ft) radius, with a 4-metre (13 ft) height of burst. The floor was divided into two sections, one covered in base soil and the other in snow simulant.

=== Hunters Trophy ===
Shot Hunters Trophy was Lawrence Livermore's last nuclear test and the second to last nuclear test conducted by the United States. Its purpose was to evaluate the radiation hardness of space and high altitude systems, such as optics, sensors and materials for the Strategic Defense Initiative, and the hardness of Sandia detonators. The test consisted of a 850-foot (260 m) horizontal line of sight (HLOS) pipe and "stub pipes" to simulate different nuclear battlefield environments.

Hunters Trophy included the experiment Hydroplus. The Defense Nuclear Agency (DNA) developed a means of verifying non-standard nuclear tests using ground peak stress and velocity at several ranges from a possible detonation point using computer hydrocodes. These codes required calibration data which was gathered at Hunters Trophy. Further Hydroplus experiments were conducted in shot Distant Zenith of Operation Sculpin.

=== Divider ===
Divider was the last nuclear test conducted by the United States.

== Cancelled tests ==
Three tests were being prepared when the moratorium ended further nuclear testing: Icecap, Gabbs and Greenwater.

Icecap was scheduled for spring 1993. It had a planned yield of 20 to 150 kilotonnes of TNT (84 to 628 TJ) and was to be fired at 1,557 feet (475 m) below the surface in Area 9. A diagnostics canister exists at the site, weighing 500,000 pounds (230,000 kg). The canister contains several experiments to be used in the test including THREX (threshold x-ray experiments) which used solid-state detectors to detect photon recoils given off by thin foils, PINEX (pinhole imaging neutron experiment) which used a pinhole to focus radiation onto a fluoroscope, NUEX (neutron experiment) which measured neutron output, and TOMEX (tomographic reconstruction experiment) which imaged the device using a streak camera. These experiments used line of sight (LOS) pipes to channel gamma, x-ray and neutron radiation from the device to them.

Gabbs was planned for early 1993 in Area 2. Unlike Icecap, no diagnostics canister is assembled at the site.

Greenwater, a Lawrence Livermore test, was to be fired in Area 19, and was a test of an x-ray laser system. The test was cancelled 16 July 1992. The Greenwater nuclear device had already been assembled at the time of cancellation, and had to be dismantled.

A fourth test, Mighty Uncle, was planned for 1993. This test was to be a follow-up to Hunters Trophy. Two other tests, Dolomite and Mexia were also planned. Mexia was planned for Area 19.

Both Gabbs and Greenwater were verifiable tests, meaning that under the Threshold Test Ban Treaty, Russia was permitted to have observers and measurement equipment on site to verify that the test yields did not exceed 150 kilotonnes of TNT (630 TJ).

== List of nuclear tests ==
United States' Julin series tests and detonations
Name (Note: The US, France and Great Britain have code-named their test events, while the USSR and China did not, and therefore have only test numbers (with some exceptions – Soviet peaceful explosions were named). Word translations into English in parentheses unless the name is a proper noun. A dash followed by a number indicates a member of a salvo event. The US also sometimes named the individual explosions in such a salvo test, which results in "name1 – 1(with name2)". If test is canceled or aborted, then the row data like date and location discloses the intended plans, where known.)	Date time (UT)	Local time zone (Note: To convert the UT time into standard local, add the number of hours in parentheses to the UT time; for local daylight saving time, add one additional hour. If the result is earlier than 00:00, add 24 hours and subtract 1 from the day; if it is 24:00 or later, subtract 24 hours and add 1 to the day. Historical time zone data obtained from the IANA time zone database.)	Location (Note: Rough place name and a latitude/longitude reference; for rocket-carried tests, the launch location is specified before the detonation location, if known. Some locations are extremely accurate; others (like airdrops and space blasts) may be quite inaccurate. "~" indicates a likely pro-forma rough location, shared with other tests in that same area.)	Elevation + height (Note: Elevation is the ground level at the point directly below the explosion relative to sea level; height is the additional distance added or subtracted by tower, balloon, shaft, tunnel, air drop or other contrivance. For rocket bursts the ground level is "N/A". In some cases it is not clear if the height is absolute or relative to ground, for example, Plumbbob/John. No number or units indicates the value is unknown, while "0" means zero. Sorting on this column is by elevation and height added together.)	Delivery (Note: Atmospheric, airdrop, balloon, gun, cruise missile, rocket, surface, tower, and barge are all disallowed by the Partial Nuclear Test Ban Treaty. Sealed shaft and tunnel are underground, and remained useful under the PTBT. Intentional cratering tests are borderline; they occurred under the treaty, were sometimes protested, and generally overlooked if the test was declared to be a peaceful use.) Purpose (Note: Include weapons development, weapon effects, safety test, transport safety test, war, science, joint verification and industrial/peaceful, which may be further broken down.)	Device (Note: Designations for test items where known, "?" indicates some uncertainty about the preceding value, nicknames for particular devices in quotes. This category of information is often not officially disclosed.)	Yield (Note: Estimated energy yield in tons, kilotons, and megatons. A ton of TNT equivalent is defined as 4.184 gigajoules (1 gigacalorie).)	Fallout (Note: Radioactive emission to the atmosphere aside from prompt neutrons, where known. The measured species is only iodine-131 if mentioned, otherwise it is all species. No entry means unknown, probably none if underground and "all" if not; otherwise notation for whether measured on the site only or off the site, where known, and the measured amount of radioactivity released.)	References	Notes
Lubbock	October 18, 1991 19:12:00.0	PST (–8 hrs)	NTS Area U3mt 37.06338°N 116.04616°W	1,213 m (3,980 ft)–457.2 m (1,500 ft)	underground shaft, weapons development		53 kt	Venting detected, 0.1 Ci (3.7 GBq)		
Junction	March 26, 1992 16:30:00.0	PST (–8 hrs)	NTS Area U19bg 37.27241°N 116.36065°W	2,013 m (6,604 ft)–622 m (2,041 ft)	underground shaft, weapons development		100 kt			Treaty verification test.
Diamond Fortune	April 30, 1992 16:30:00.0	PST (–8 hrs)	NTS Area U12p.05 37.23413°N 116.15823°W	1,656 m (5,433 ft)–236 m (774 ft)	tunnel, weapon effect		3 kt	Venting detected, 0.2 Ci (7.4 GBq)		
Victoria	June 19, 1992 16:45:00.0	PST (–8 hrs)	NTS Area U3kv 37.00537°N 116.01101°W	1,179 m (3,868 ft)–244 m (801 ft)	underground shaft, weapons development		80 t			
Galena-Green - 3	June 23, 1992 15:00:00.07	PST (–8 hrs)	NTS Area U9cv 37.12384°N 116.03232°W	1,269 m (4,163 ft) +	underground shaft, safety experiment		less than 5 kt			Simultaneous, same hole.
Galena-Orange - 2	June 23, 1992 15:00:00.07	PST (–8 hrs)	NTS Area U9cv 37.12384°N 116.03232°W	1,269 m (4,163 ft) +	underground shaft, safety experiment		less than 5 kt			Simultaneous, same hole.
Galena-Yellow - 1	June 23, 1992 15:00:00.072	PST (–8 hrs)	NTS Area U9cv 37.12384°N 116.03232°W	1,269 m (4,163 ft)–400 m (1,300 ft)	underground shaft, weapons development		less than 5 kt			Simultaneous, same hole.
Hunters Trophy	September 18, 1992 17:00:00.078	PST (–8 hrs)	NTS Area U12n.24 37.20687°N 116.21085°W	1,827 m (5,994 ft)–385.3 m (1,264 ft)	tunnel, weapon effect		4 kt	Venting detected, 1 Ci (37 GBq)		Test included experiment Hydroplus.
Divider	September 23, 1992 15:04:00.0	PST (–8 hrs)	NTS Area U3ml 37.02063°N 115.98878°W	1,208 m (3,963 ft)–426 m (1,398 ft)	underground shaft, weapons development		5 kt	Venting detected, 0.1 Ci (3.7 GBq)		Last U.S. nuclear test; "test to ensure safety of deterrent forces".

== Gallery ==
Operation Julin
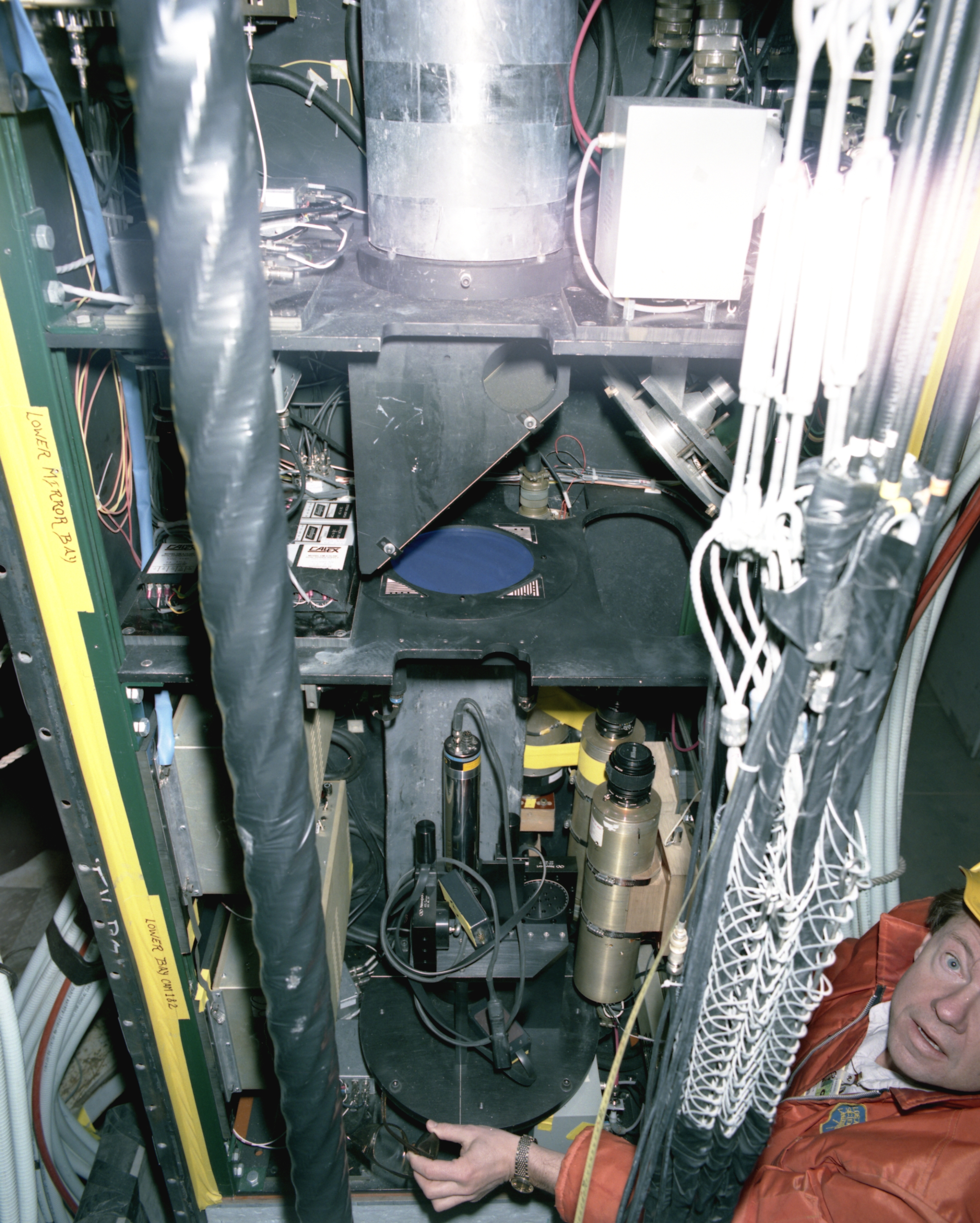
PINEX equipment for shot Junction.

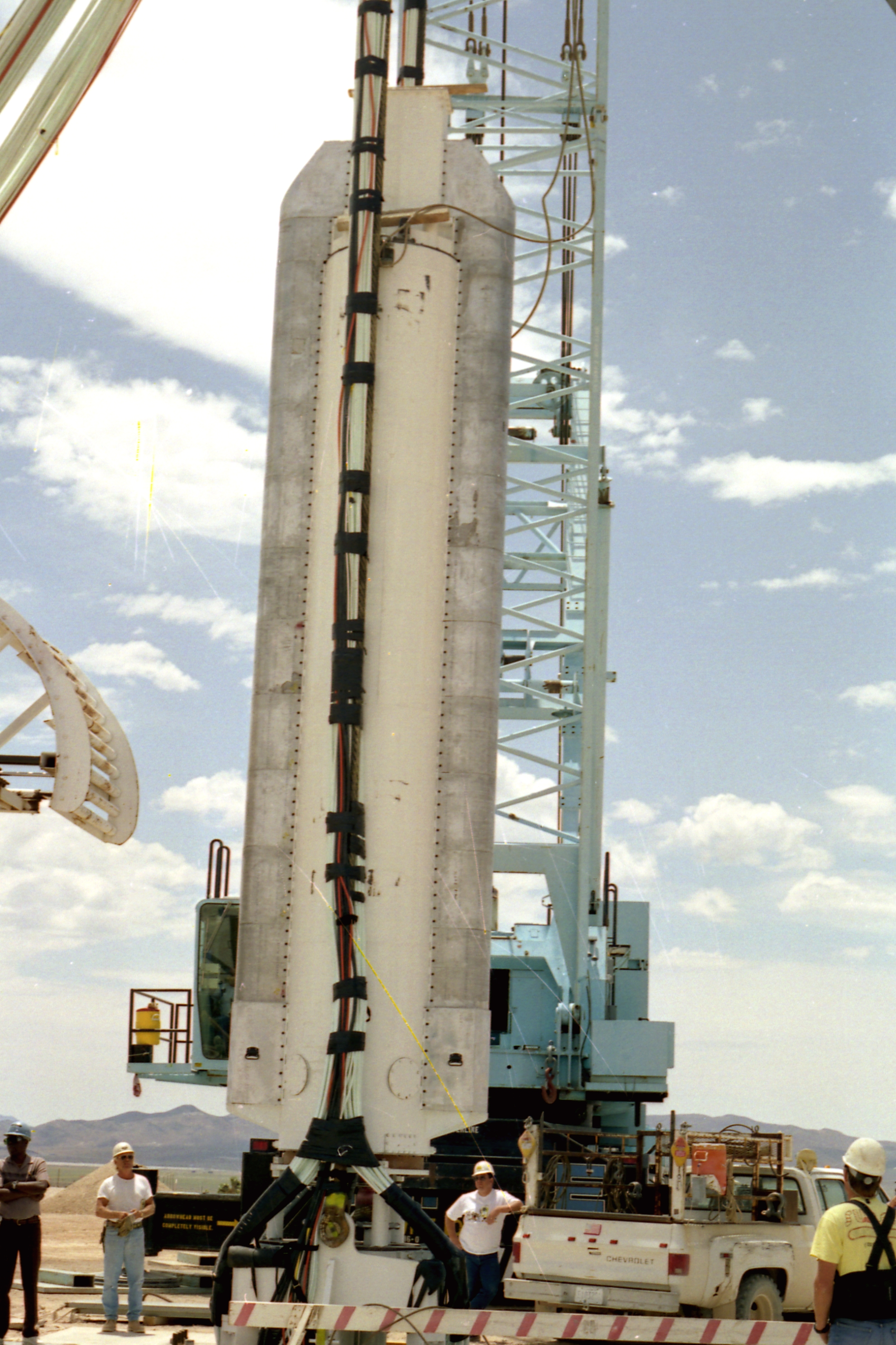
Diagnostics rack for shot Divider.

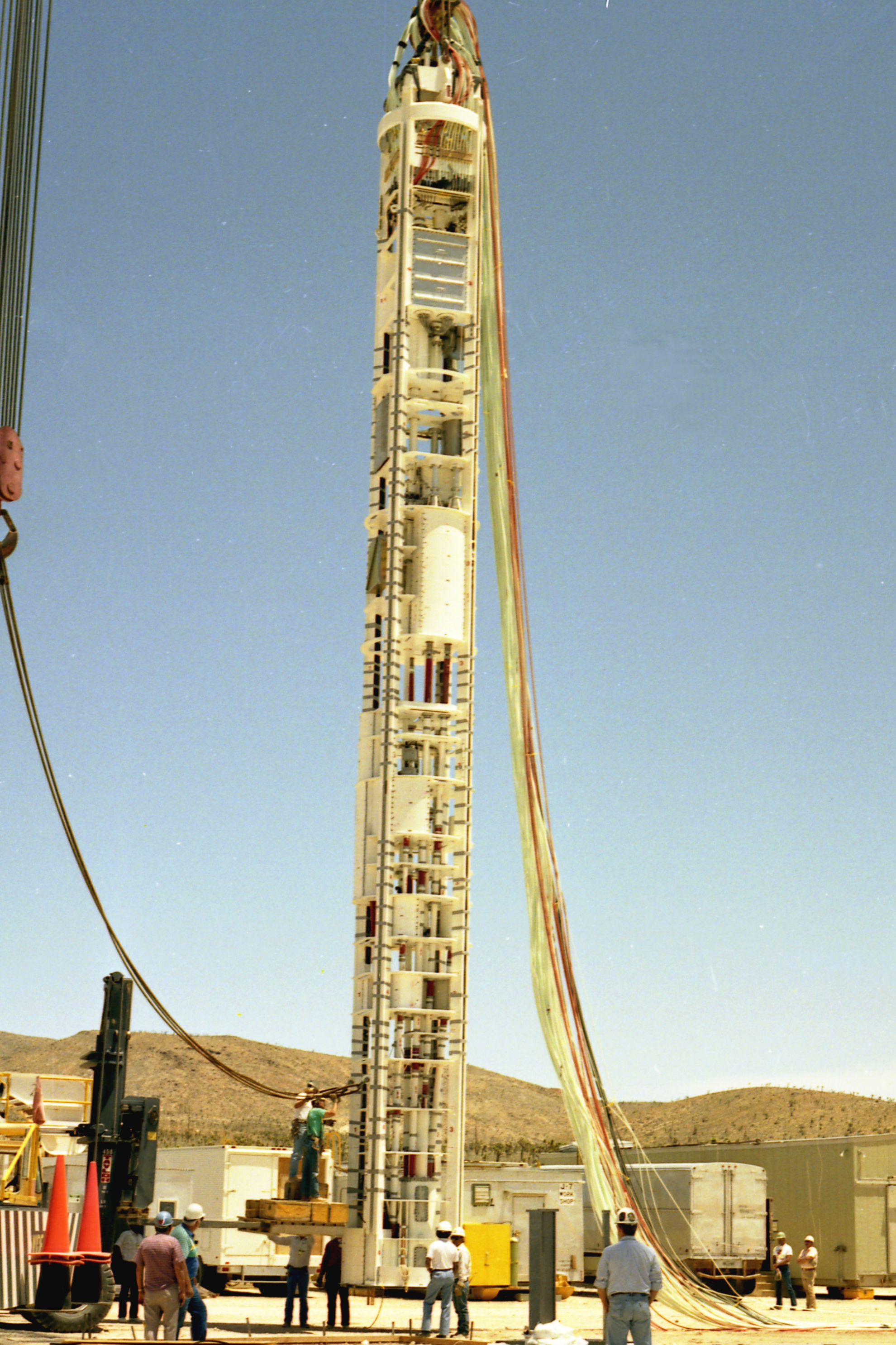
Diagnostics rack for shot Divider.

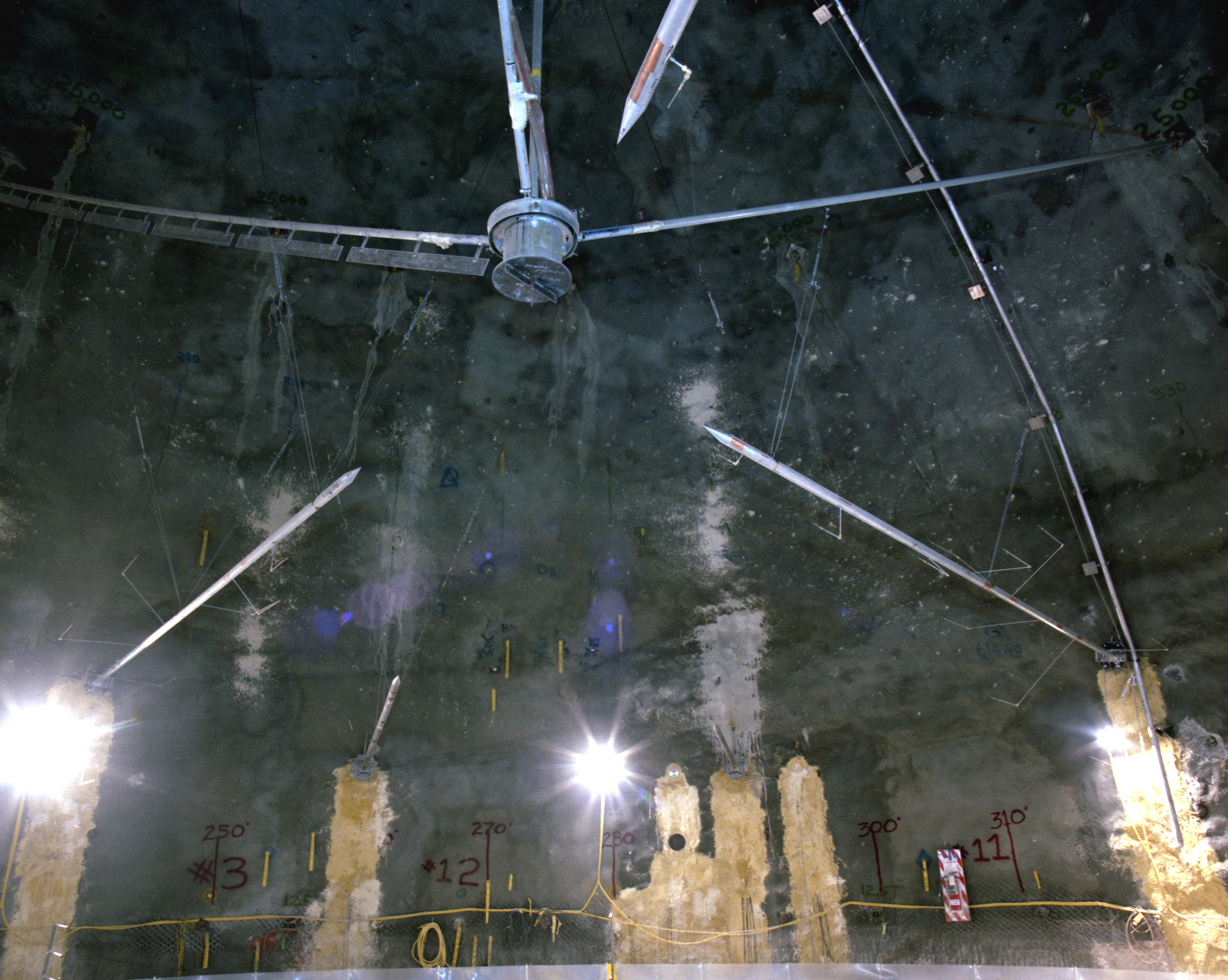
Zero point (warhead point) for shot Diamond Fortune. The test device would be affixed to the inverted tripod. The points extending from the walls are for blast measurement.

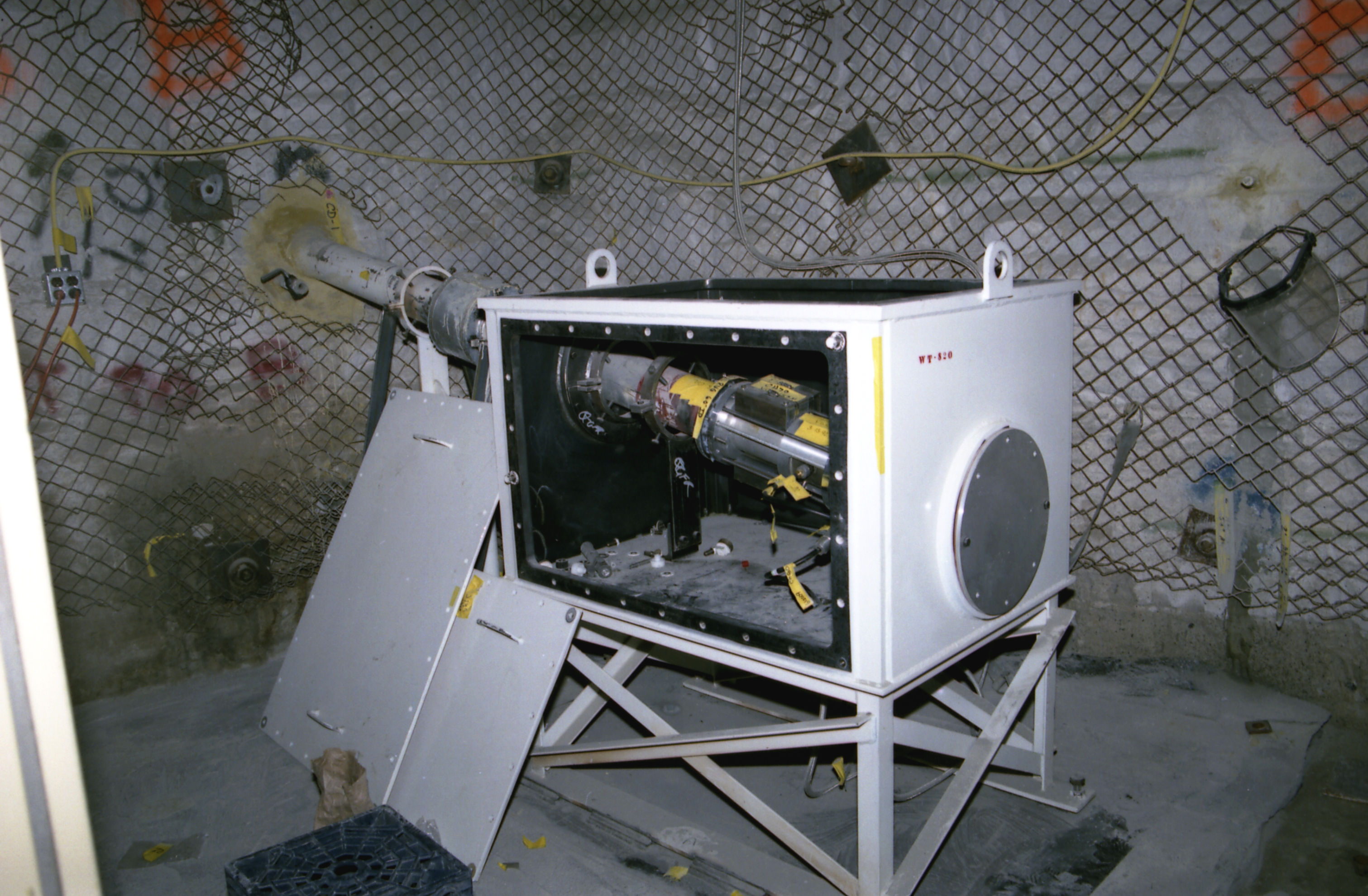
Alpha (neutron multiplication rate) sensor for shot Diamond Fortune.

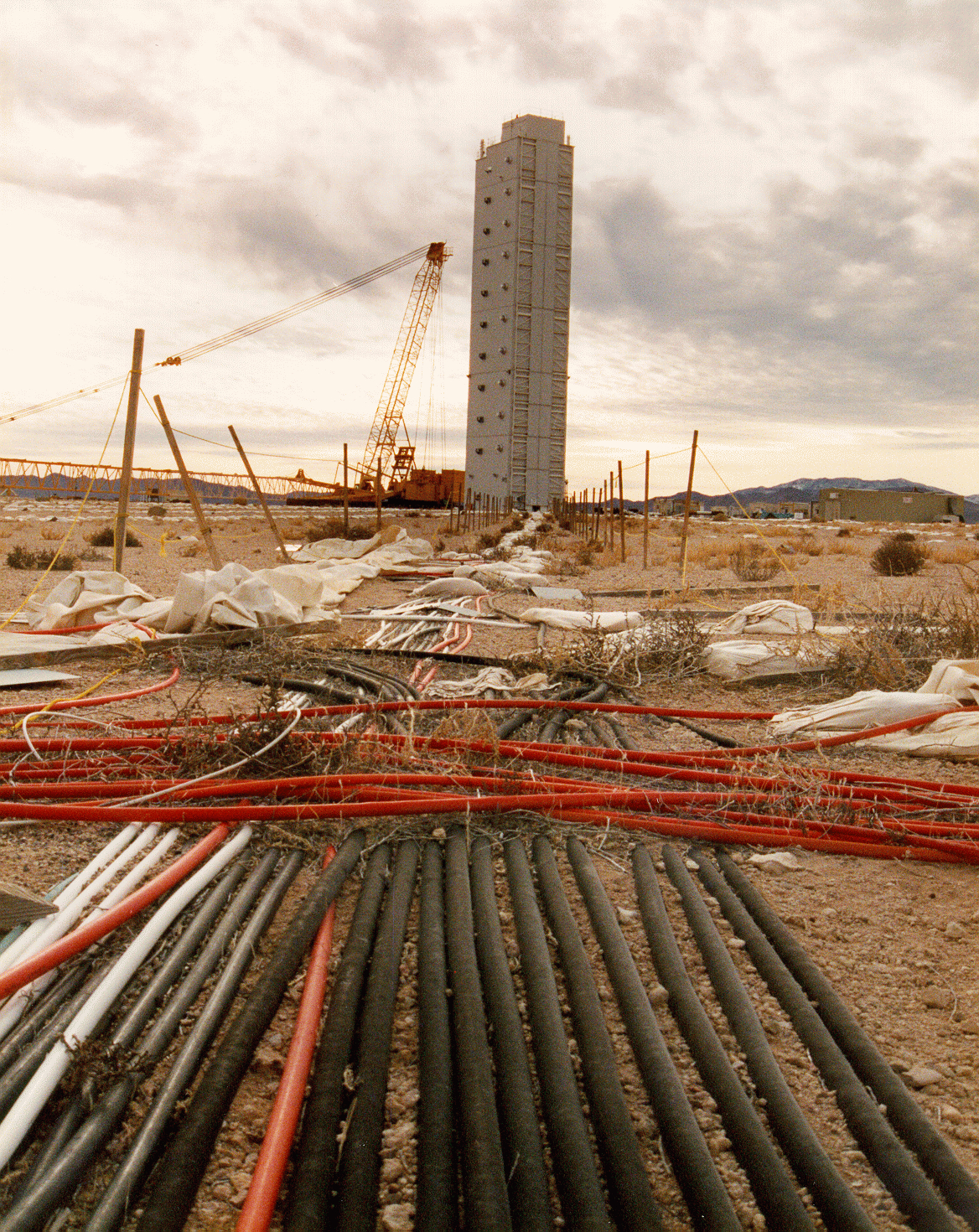
The tower that would have lowered the Icecap device into the ground

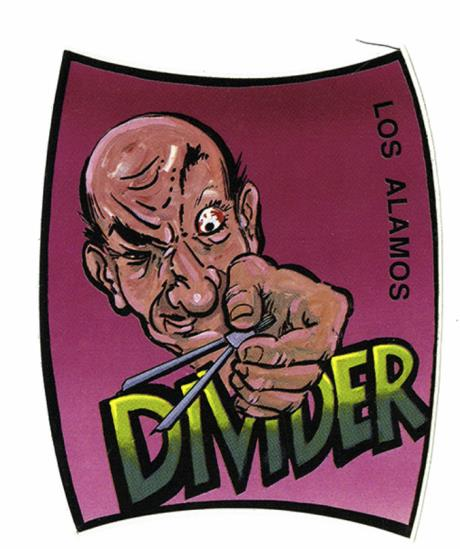
Patch for Divider

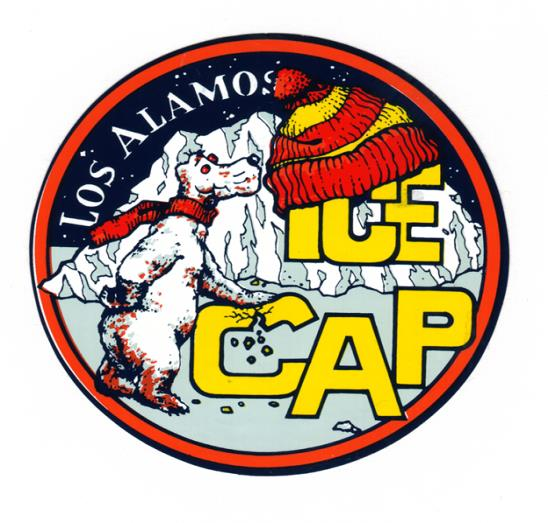
Patch for the cancelled Icecap test

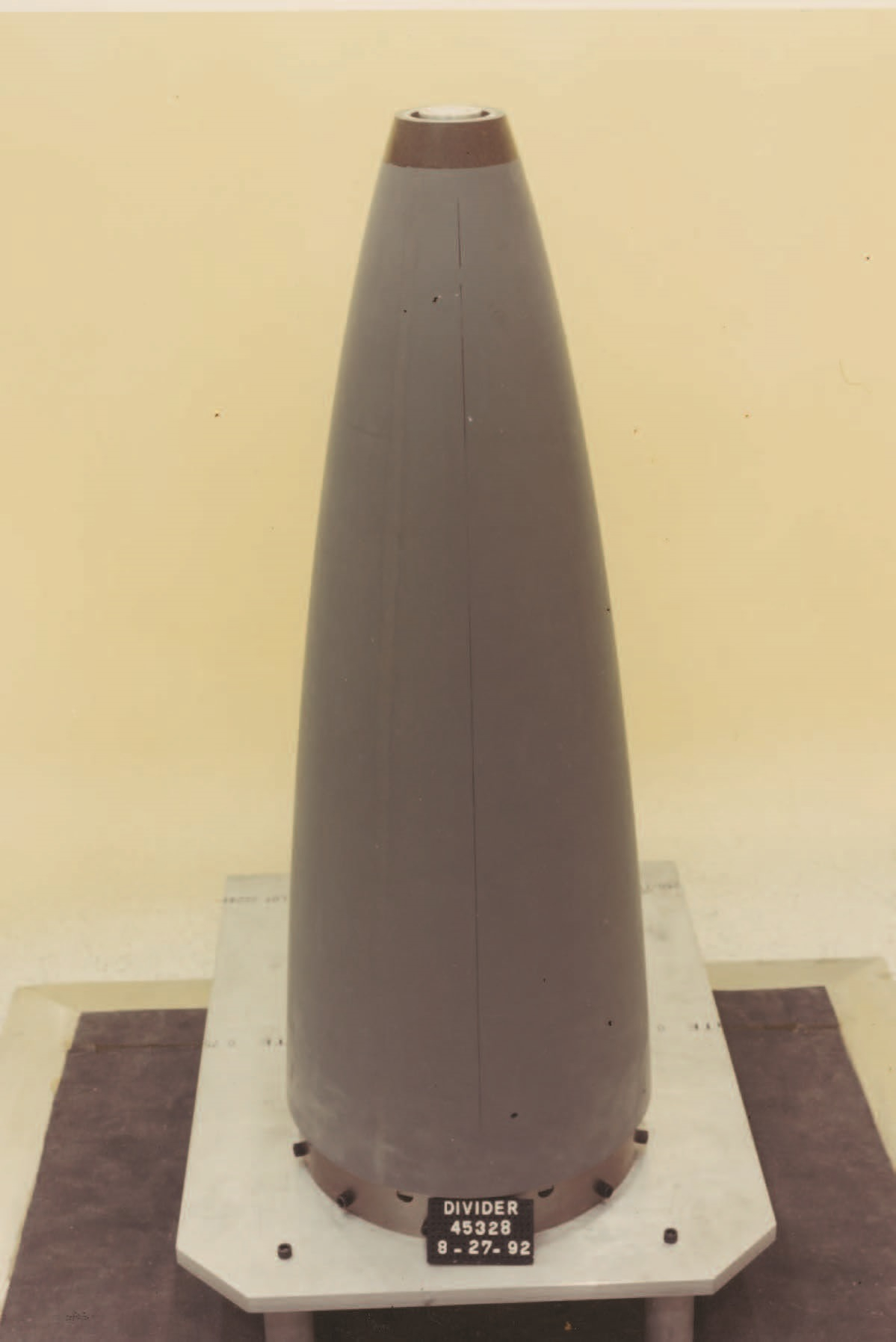
Nuclear test device for Divider

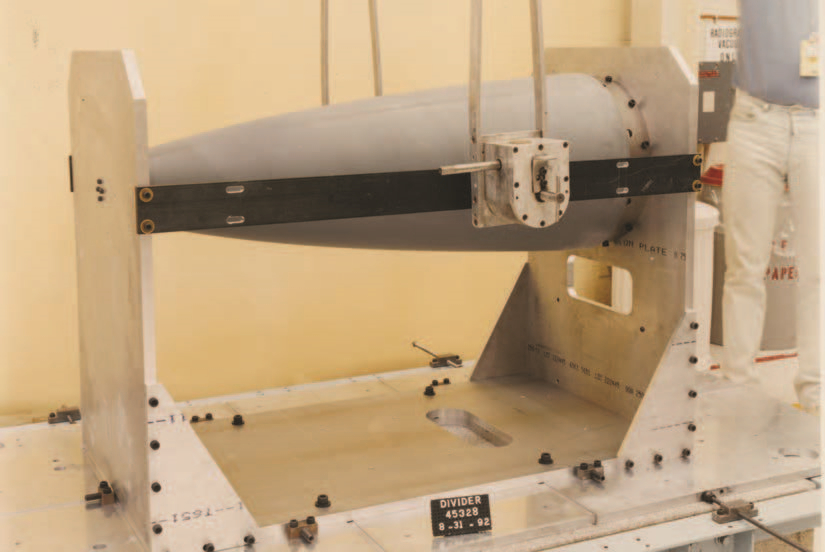
Nuclear test device for Divider

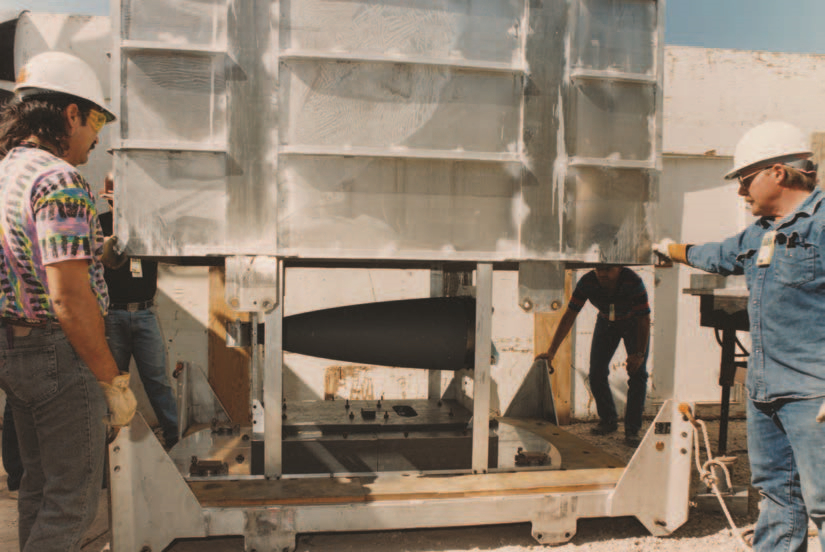
Divider device being unloaded at the shot hole.

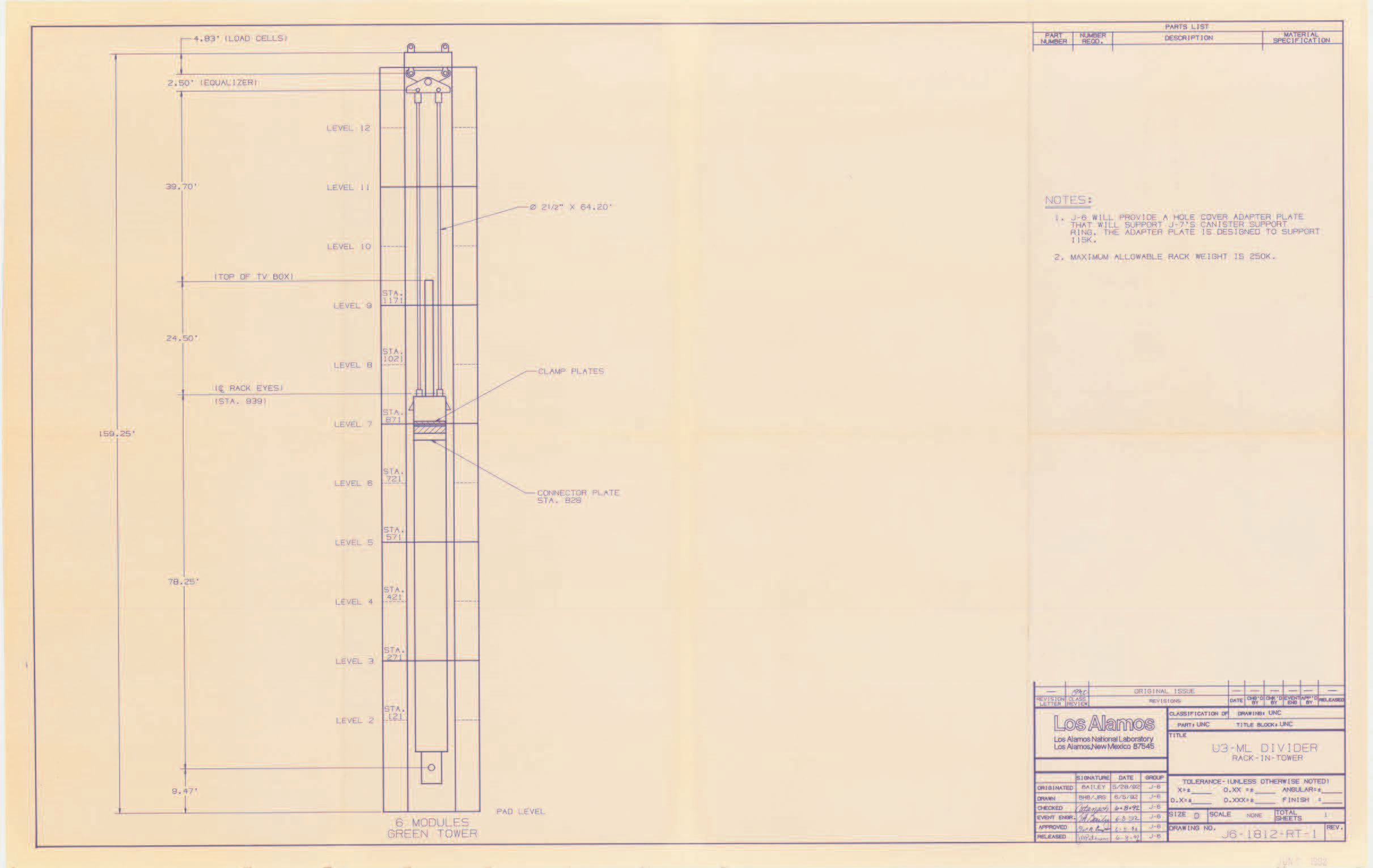
Drawing of the Divider diagnostic rack.

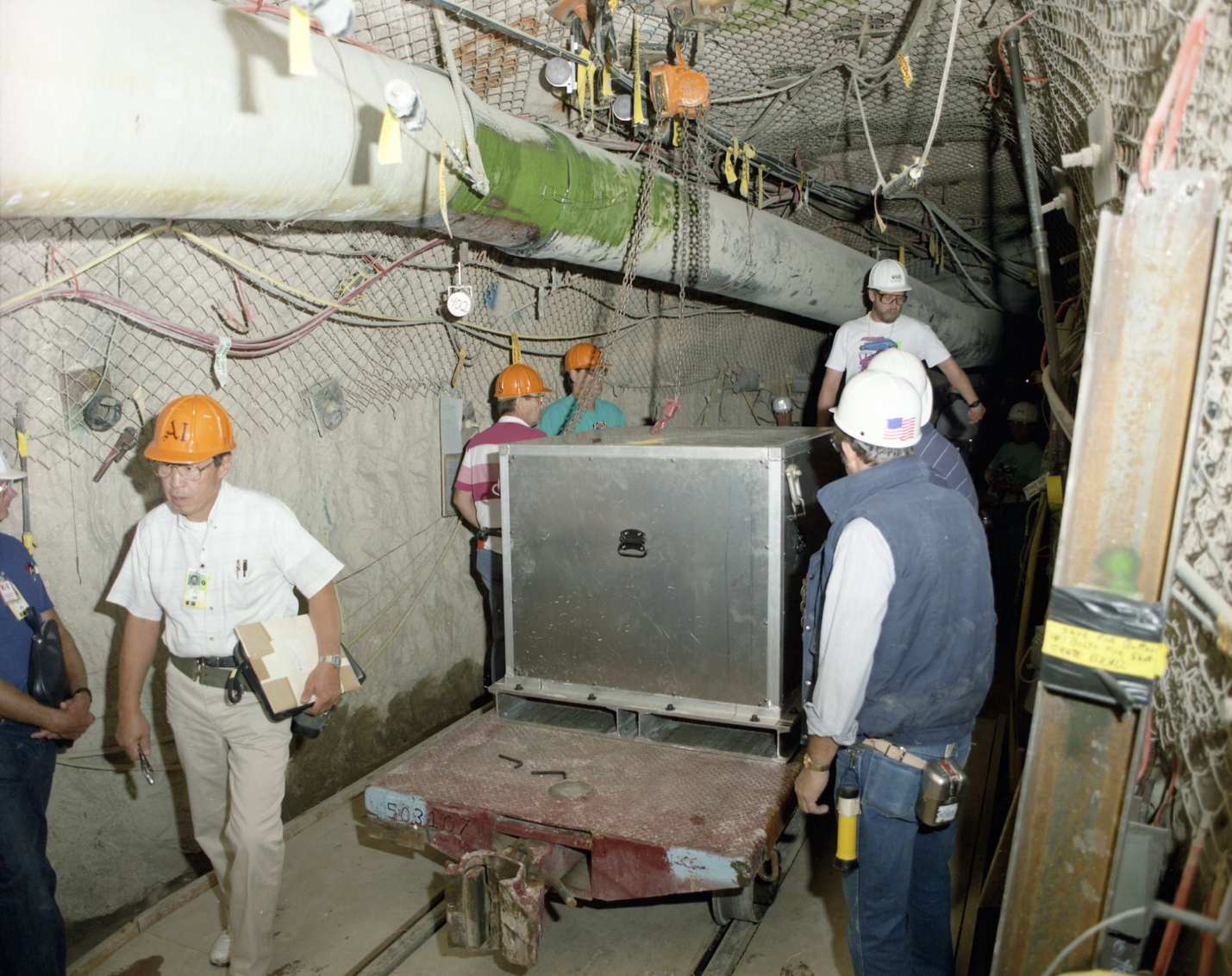
The nuclear device for Hunters Trophy is moved through N tunnel
