= Operation Sculpin =

Series of 1990s US nuclear tests

Sculpin

Information
- Country: United States
- Test site: NTS Area 12, Rainier Mesa; NTS Area 19, 20, Pahute Mesa; NTS, Areas 1-4, 6-10, Yucca Flat
- Period: 1990–1991
- Number of tests: 7
- Test type: underground shaft, tunnel
- Max. yield: 140 kilotonnes of TNT (590 TJ)

Test series chronology

The United States's Sculpin nuclear test series was a group of 7 nuclear tests conducted between October 1990 and September 1991. These tests (Note: A bomb test may be a salvo test, defined as two or more explosions "where a period of time between successive individual explosions does not exceed 5 seconds and where the burial points of all explosive devices can be connected by segments of straight lines, each of them connecting two burial points and does not exceed 40 kilometers in length".Mikhailov, V. N. "Catalog of World Wide Nuclear Testing". Begell-Atom. Archived from the original on April 26, 2014.) followed the Operation Aqueduct series and preceded the Operation Julin series.

== Shots ==
=== Distant Zenith ===
Shot Distant Zenith included the experiment Hydroplus. The Defense Nuclear Agency (DNA) developed a means of verifying non-standard nuclear tests using ground peak stress and velocity at several ranges from a possible detonation point using computer hydrocodes. These codes required calibration data which was gathered at Distant Zenith. Further Hydroplus experiments were conducted in shot Hunters Trophy of Operation Julin.

== Full list of shots ==
United States' Sculpin series tests and detonations
Name (Note: The US, France and Great Britain have code-named their test events, while the USSR and China did not, and therefore have only test numbers (with some exceptions – Soviet peaceful explosions were named). Word translations into English in parentheses unless the name is a proper noun. A dash followed by a number indicates a member of a salvo event. The US also sometimes named the individual explosions in such a salvo test, which results in "name1 – 1(with name2)". If test is canceled or aborted, then the row data like date and location discloses the intended plans, where known.)	Date time (UT)	Local time zone (Note: To convert the UT time into standard local, add the number of hours in parentheses to the UT time; for local daylight saving time, add one additional hour. If the result is earlier than 00:00, add 24 hours and subtract 1 from the day; if it is 24:00 or later, subtract 24 hours and add 1 to the day. Historical time zone data obtained from the IANA time zone database.)	Location (Note: Rough place name and a latitude/longitude reference; for rocket-carried tests, the launch location is specified before the detonation location, if known. Some locations are extremely accurate; others (like airdrops and space blasts) may be quite inaccurate. "~" indicates a likely pro-forma rough location, shared with other tests in that same area.)	Elevation + height (Note: Elevation is the ground level at the point directly below the explosion relative to sea level; height is the additional distance added or subtracted by tower, balloon, shaft, tunnel, air drop or other contrivance. For rocket bursts the ground level is "N/A". In some cases it is not clear if the height is absolute or relative to ground, for example, Plumbbob/John. No number or units indicates the value is unknown, while "0" means zero. Sorting on this column is by elevation and height added together.)	Delivery (Note: Atmospheric, airdrop, balloon, gun, cruise missile, rocket, surface, tower, and barge are all disallowed by the Partial Nuclear Test Ban Treaty. Sealed shaft and tunnel are underground, and remained useful under the PTBT. Intentional cratering tests are borderline; they occurred under the treaty, were sometimes protested, and generally overlooked if the test was declared to be a peaceful use.) Purpose (Note: Include weapons development, weapon effects, safety test, transport safety test, war, science, joint verification and industrial/peaceful, which may be further broken down.)	Device (Note: Designations for test items where known, "?" indicates some uncertainty about the preceding value, nicknames for particular devices in quotes. This category of information is often not officially disclosed.)	Yield (Note: Estimated energy yield in tons, kilotons, and megatons. A ton of TNT equivalent is defined as 4.184 gigajoules (1 gigacalorie).)	Fallout (Note: Radioactive emission to the atmosphere aside from prompt neutrons, where known. The measured species is only iodine-131 if mentioned, otherwise it is all species. No entry means unknown, probably none if underground and "all" if not; otherwise notation for whether measured on the site only or off the site, where known, and the measured amount of radioactivity released.)	References	Notes
Tenabo	October 12, 1990 17:30:00.08	PST (–8 hrs)	NTS Area U20bb 37.24781°N 116.4951°W	1,871 m (6,138 ft)–600 m (2,000 ft)	underground shaft, weapons development		140 kt	Venting detected		
Coso-Bronze - 1	March 8, 1991 21:02:45.08	PST (–8 hrs)	NTS Area U4an 37.10436°N 116.07486°W	1,254 m (4,114 ft)–333 m (1,093 ft)	underground shaft, weapons development		3.5 kt			Simultaneous, same drifts.
Coso-Gray - 2	March 8, 1991 21:02:45.08	PST (–8 hrs)	NTS Area U4an 37.10436°N 116.07486°W	1,254 m (4,114 ft) +	underground shaft, weapons development		8 kt			Simultaneous, same drifts.
Coso-Silver - 3	March 8, 1991 21:02:45.08	PST (–8 hrs)	NTS Area U4an 37.10436°N 116.07486°W	1,254 m (4,114 ft) +	underground shaft, safety experiment		less than 5 kt			Simultaneous, same drifts.
Bexar	April 4, 1991 19:00:00.0	PST (–8 hrs)	NTS Area U19ba 37.29603°N 116.31379°W	2,118 m (6,949 ft)–629.4 m (2,065 ft)	underground shaft, weapons development		140 kt	Venting detected, 0.5 Ci (19 GBq)		
Montello	April 16, 1991 15:30:00.071	PST (–8 hrs)	NTS Area U20bf 37.24538°N 116.44252°W	1,961 m (6,434 ft)–641.6 m (2,105 ft)	underground shaft, weapons development		80 kt			
Floydada	August 15, 1991 16:00:00.0	PST (–8 hrs)	NTS Area U7cb 37.08729°N 116.00266°W	1,280 m (4,200 ft)–502.9 m (1,650 ft)	underground shaft, weapons development		3 kt			
Hoya	September 14, 1991 19:00:00.005	PST (–8 hrs)	NTS Area U20be 37.22558°N 116.42902°W	1,951 m (6,401 ft)–658 m (2,159 ft)	underground shaft, weapon effect		100 kt			Treaty verification test.
Distant Zenith	September 19, 1991 15:30:00.067	PST (–8 hrs)	NTS Area U12p.04 37.23568°N 116.16731°W	1,921 m (6,302 ft)–263.8 m (865 ft)	tunnel, weapon effect		1.5 kt	Venting detected, 0.4 Ci (15 GBq)		Test included experiment Hydroplus.

== Gallery ==
Operation Sculpin
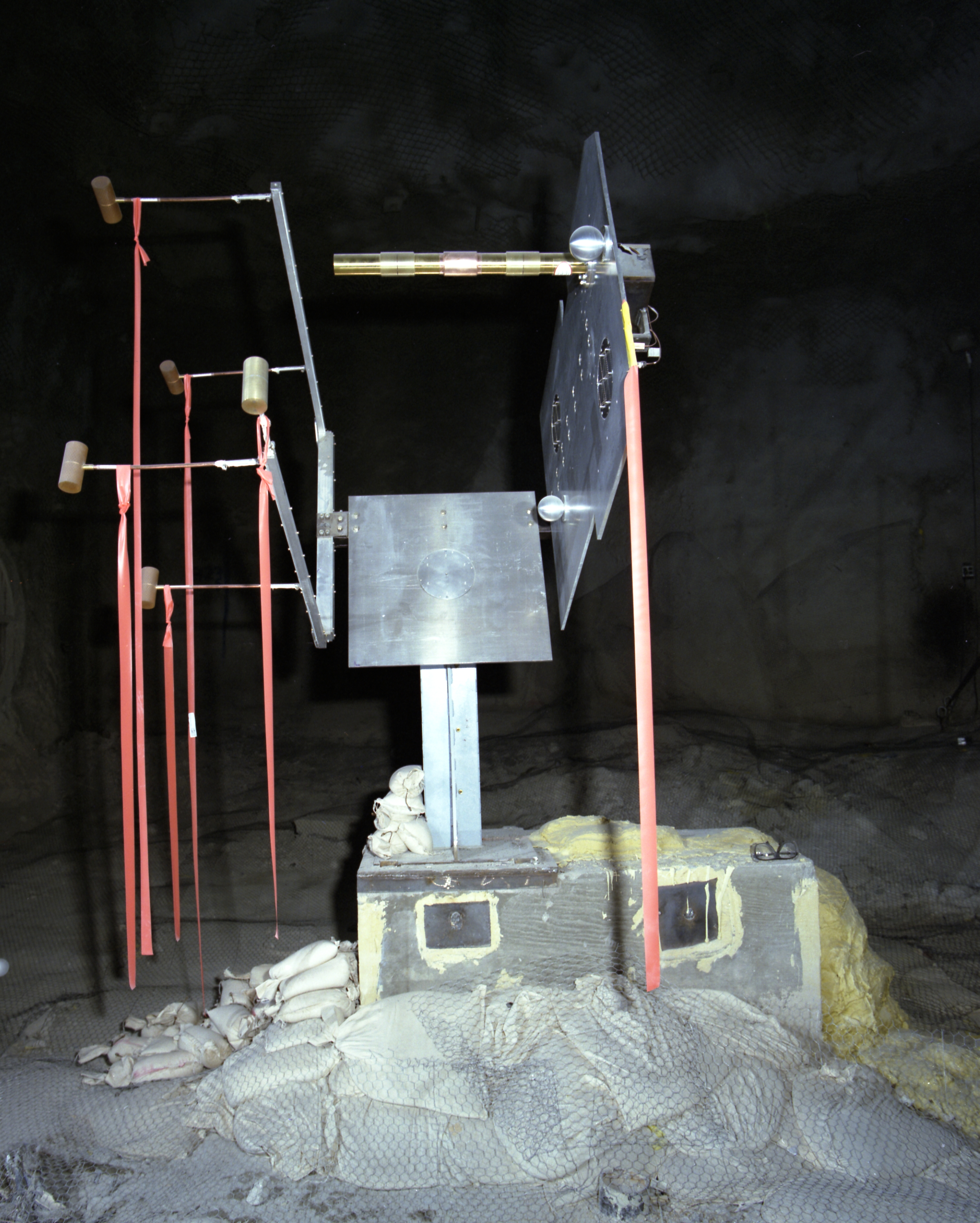
EMP experiment for shot Distant Zenith

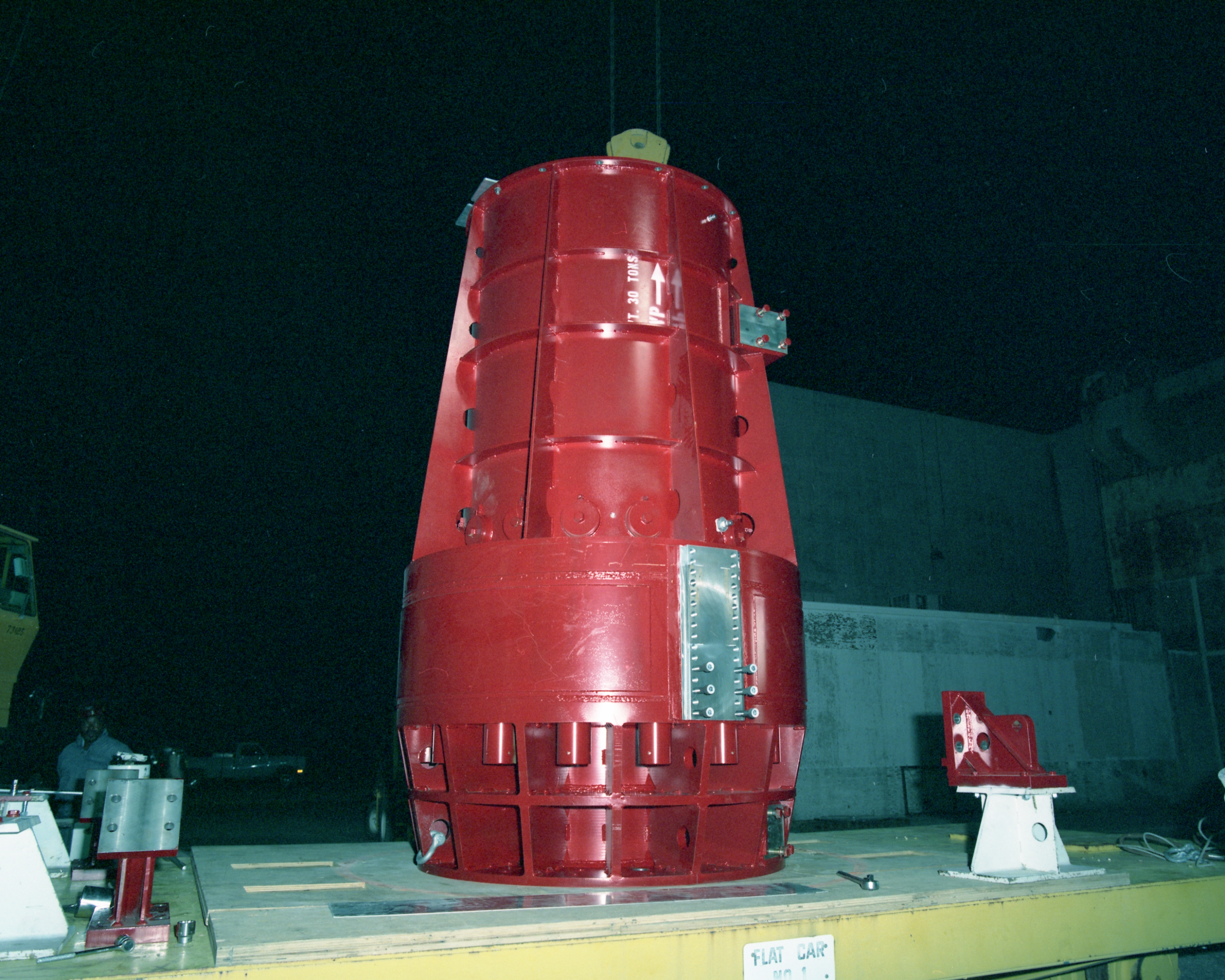
Fast acting closure (FAC) for shot Distant Zenith

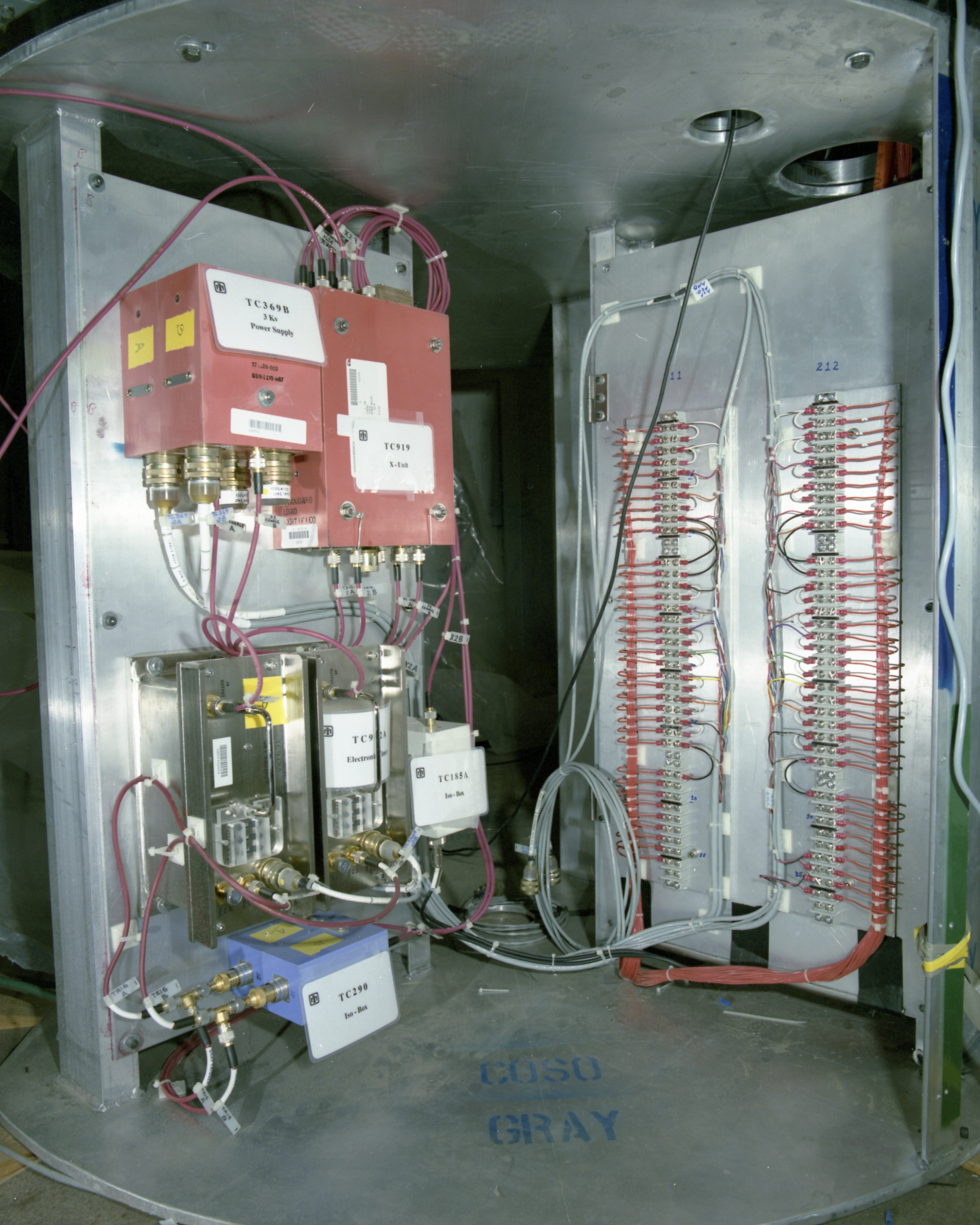
Arming and Firing equipment for shot Coso. Visible is the X-unit, high voltage power supply, electronic timers and isolation modules.

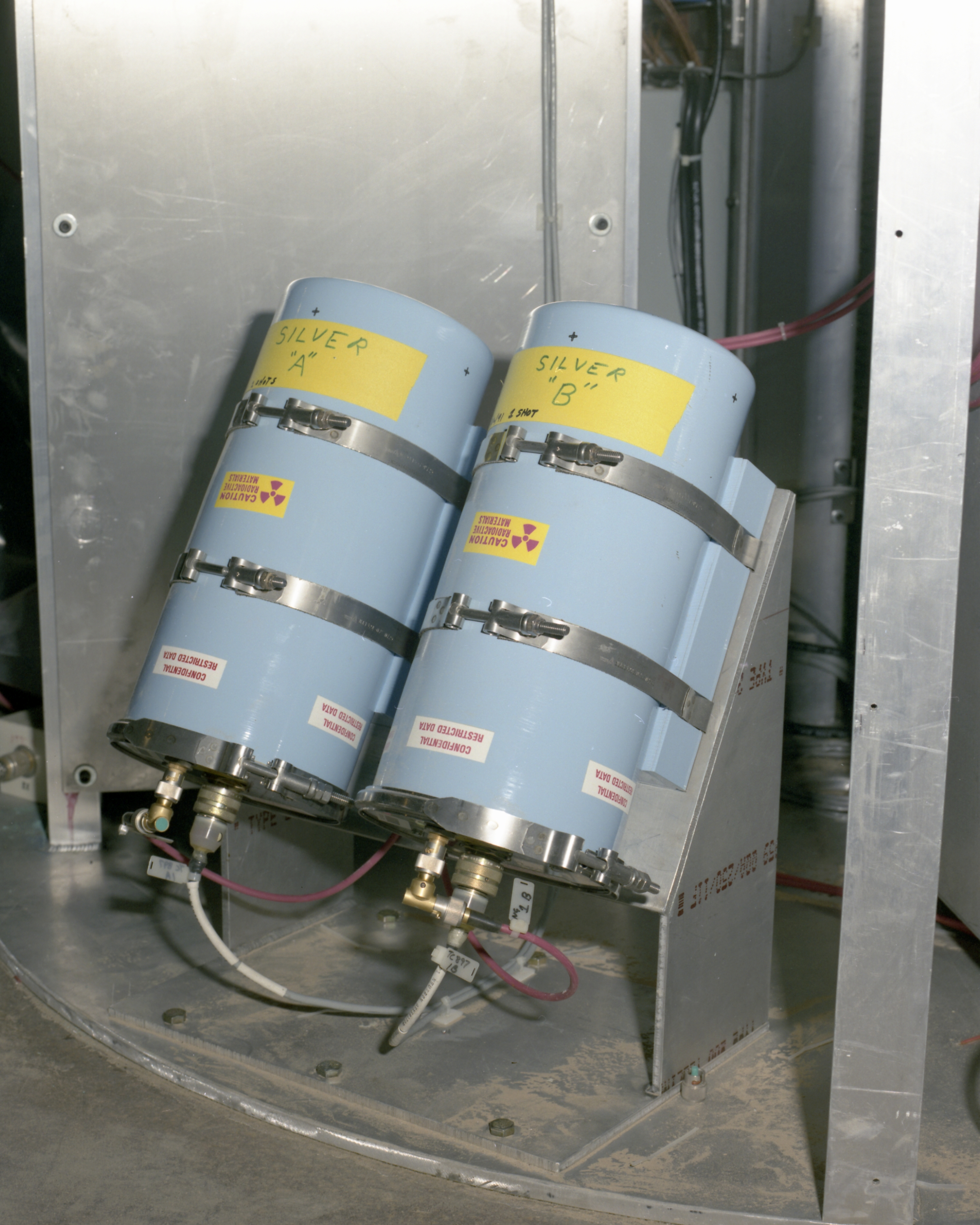
Neutron generators for shot Coso Silver.
