= Słupsk-Redzikowo Airport =

Former airport in Poland

Słupsk-Redzikowo Airport Port Lotniczy Słupsk
- IATA: OSP; ICAO: EPSK

Summary
- Airport type: Public
- Serves: Słupsk, Poland
- Coordinates: 54°28′44″N 017°06′27″E

Map
- Location of the airport in Poland

Runways
Direction	Length		Surface
Direction	m	ft	Surface
0	2,200	7,200	Concrete

Statistics (2007 +/- change from 2006)
- Passengers: 0
- Cargo (in tons): 0
- Takeoffs/Landings: 0
- Source: Polish AIP at EUROCONTROL

Słupsk-Redzikowo Airport (ICAO: EPSK) is a disused civil airport in Słupsk (100,000 inhabitants), northern Poland. Its airport in Słupsk-Redzikowo, that has a 7,200-foot-long runway, and a record of serving domestic flights to the popular seaside destination close to the Baltic sea. In the 1980s there were scheduled flights to Warsaw and Koszalin, and before World War II to Berlin and Königsberg. It covers approximately 2.5 million people in its catchment area, and many popular seaside resorts. Słupsk participates in the "DEAR" project, that supports the local authorities trying to revive its airports.

== History ==
The airfield Stolp-West was opened in 1916 for the Imperial German Luftstreitkräfte, after the Versailles Treaty the airfield was used as a civilian airport. It became a vital connection to East Prussia, which was cut off from mainland Germany by the Polish Corridor. In 1921, the "Luftverkehrsgesellschaft Pommern" was founded which operated from Stolp-West. The Deutsche Luft Hansa started to use the airport in 1926, a large hangar for six aircraft was built and the airfield served as an intermediate between Berlin, Stettin and the Free City of Danzig and Königsberg.

In 1935, a new Luftwaffe airfield Stolp-Reitz was built. In World War II, the airbase served as a basis for Sturzkampfgeschwader 2"Immelmann" (Ju 87B) between May and September 1939, the I./Trägergruppe 186 (Ju 87B) and the naval Ju 87B divebombers intended for service on board of German aircraft carrier Graf Zeppelin. In January 1940, it became home to the second squadron of the third Fighter School (II./Jagdfliegerschule 3). Units of the Jagdgeschwader 54 and the Jagdgeschwader 103 were stationed at the base. Stolp-Reitz was never attacked by Allied bomber, the airfield was blown up on 8 March 1945 just before the Red Army reached the region.

After the Second World War, it was used by the Red Army until 1950. Later regular connection to Katowice, Koszalin, Warsaw and Wrocław were established.

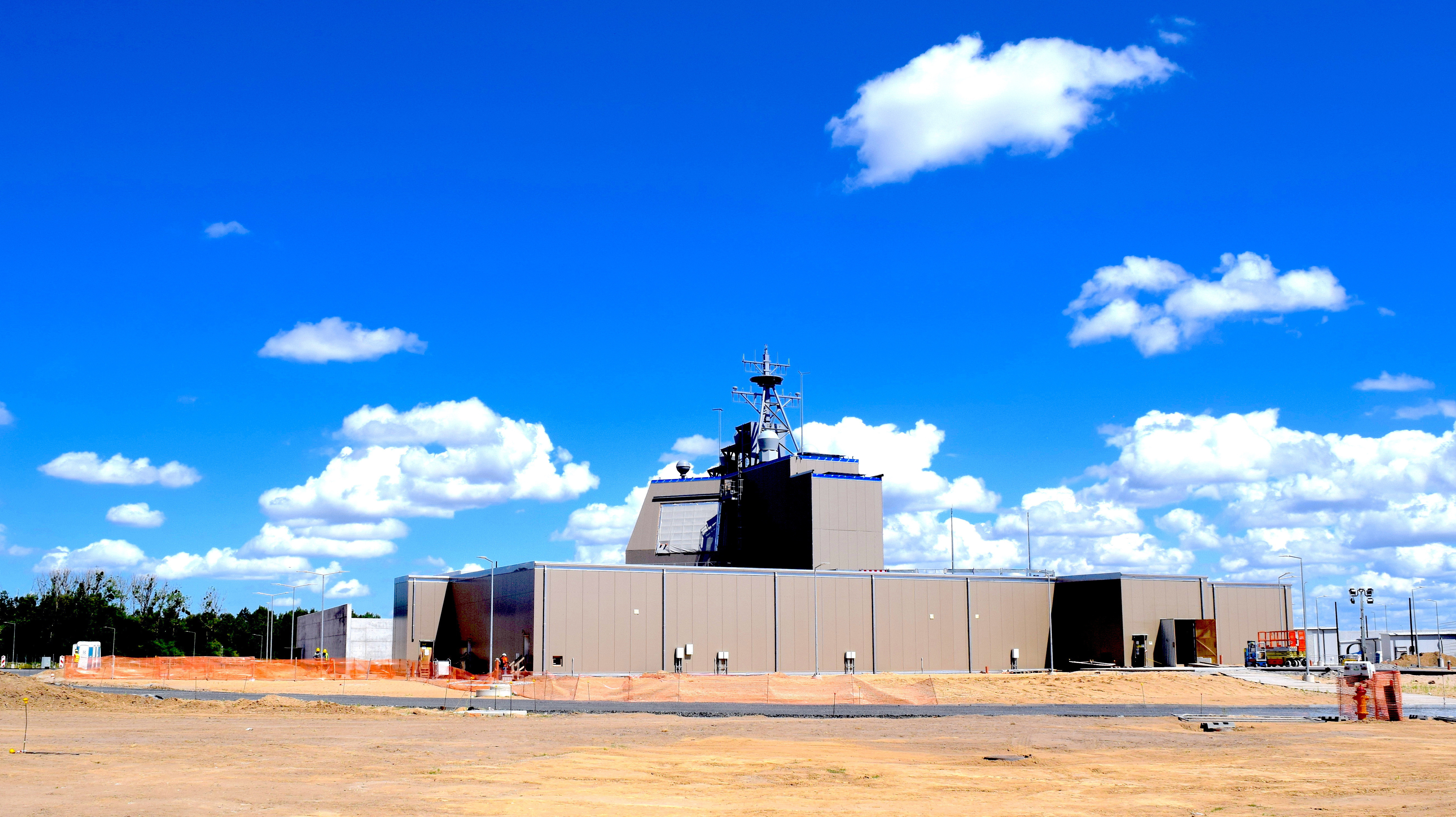
Construction site of the Naval Support Facility in Redzikowo, Poland, August 2019

Beginning in 2016, the airfield is in the process of being demolished as part of the construction of the Aegis Ballistic Missile Defense System and has been renamed Naval Support Facility Redzikowo.

== Airport infrastructure ==
There exists a railroad line to the terminal that can be used for passenger service.
