= Redzikowo =

- Village
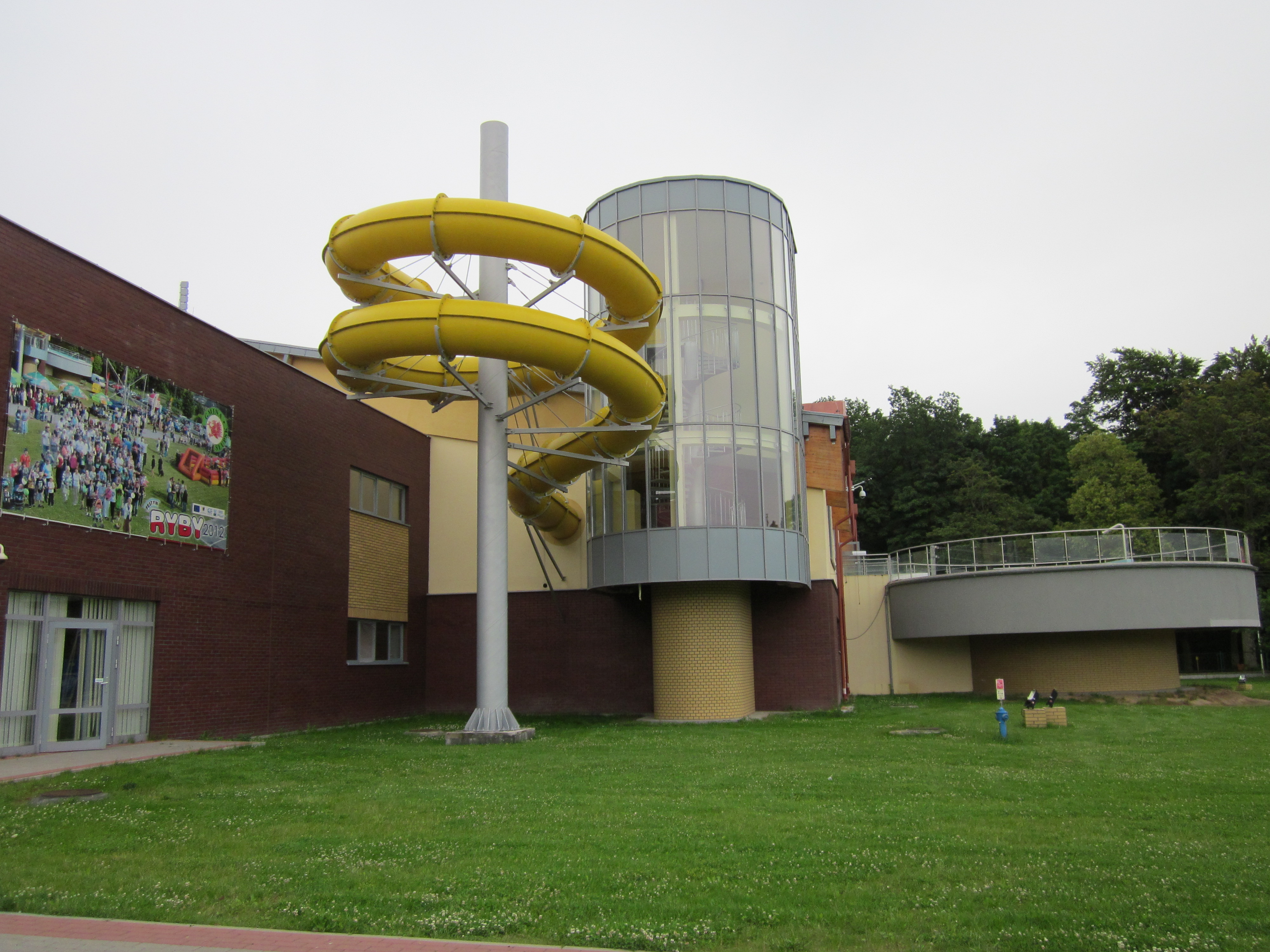
- Swimming pool in Redzikowo

- Location within Poland
- Coordinates: 54°28′22″N 17°7′23″E
- Country: Poland
- Voivodeship: Pomerania
- Powiat: Słupsk
- Gmina: Słupsk
- First mentioned: 1282

Government
  - Sołtys: Jerzy Wroniszewski

Area
  - Total: 16.57 km^{2} (6.40 sq mi)

Population (2024)
  - Total: 1,400
- Time zone: UTC+1 (CET)
  - Summer (DST): UTC+2 (CEST)
- Vehicle registration: GSL
- Website: redzikowo.pl

Redzikowo [rɛd͡ʑiˈkɔvɔ] (German: Reitz) is a village in northern Poland, located in Gmina Słupsk, Słupsk County, Pomeranian Voivodeship, 5 km (3 mi) to the east of Słupsk.

Just to the north of it is the Słupsk-Redzikowo Airport which is the site of a US missile defense complex that was planned to be built by 2012. The original project was cancelled in September 2009. The Aegis Ashore component of the Aegis Ballistic Missile Defense System was constructed instead, starting in 2018. After some construction delays, the Naval Support Facility-Redzikowo became operational in 2023.

== Etymology ==
The name of the village comes from the old Slavic male name Redzik, Radzik or Razik.

== History ==
Bronze Age necklaces and shoulder pads were found in the village. The village is first mentioned in historical records from 1282, when it was part of fragmented Poland, and duke Mestwin II granted the village to a monastery of Norbertine nuns in Słupsk. In subsequent centuries the village had been a fief owned in succession by various noble families. Later on, it formed part of the duchies of Słupsk and Pomerania. In the 18th century the village became part of the Kingdom of Prussia, and in 1871 it became part of the German Empire. In 1814 the manor was sold to the Arnold family. In 1938 the owner of the estate had been Friedrich Wilhelm Arnold.

In 1935 the construction of an airfield named Stolp-Reitz started next to the village (earlier airfield named Stolp-West located in the area was built during World War I). Later the airfield became an Air Weapons School for the Luftwaffe, and a number of hangars and other buildings were added. At the beginning of World War II in September 1939, Germany used these airfields to launch air strikes on Poland.

Towards the end of the Second World War, on March 8, 1945, the residents of Reitz began a trek to escape the approaching Red Army and reached Marienfelde, which belonged to the Lojow estate. They were overrun by the Red Army soldiers and returned to the village at the end of April 1945. After the end of the hostilities, the region was handed over to the People's Republic of Poland by the Soviet occupying forces. From the end of World War II to 1950 the base was used by the Soviet Air Force. Although after the end of the war the region became part of Poland, Redzikowo and its airfield remained under Russian control until 1950. It was handed over to the Polish Air Force in 1950. The deportation of the local ethnic German population only took place in 1950.

The base was subsequently used by the 28 Słupski Pułk Lotnictwa Myśliwskiego (28th Słupsk Fighter Aviation Regiment, disbanded in 1999). It also functioned for a time as a civil airport. At present the airfield is only used by small civil airplanes.

== Aegis Ashore ==
The governments of the United States and Poland approved the building and operation of an Aegis Ashore AN/SPY-1 system adjacent to the village. Delays added around four years to the construction process, stretching the start of operations into 2023. Another system is at Deveselu, Romania, and has been operational since 2016. They are part of the European Phased Adaptive Approach to regional missile defence against threats from Iran and includes Aegis radar-capable ships based at Rota, Spain, and AN/TPY-2 radar in Turkey (operational since 2011). Naval Support Facility-Redzikowo was declared operational on 13 November 2024.
