= Aegis Ballistic Missile Defense System =

United States anti-ballistic missile program

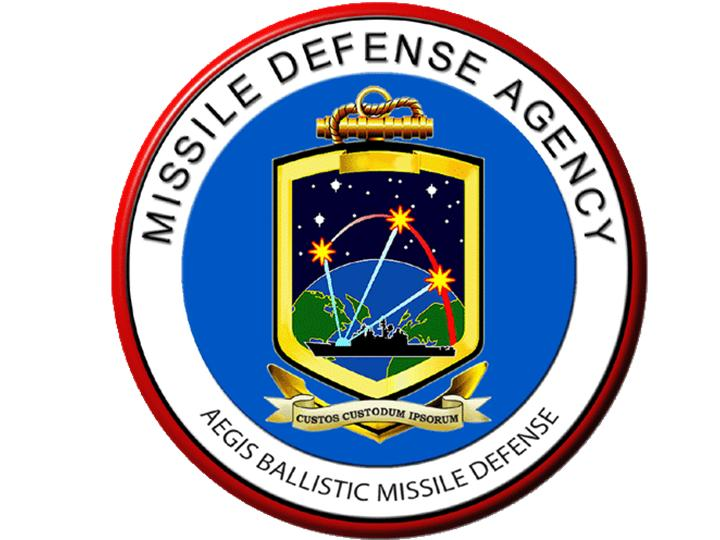
The motto in Latin: Custos Custodum Ipsorum means "Guard of the Guardians Themselves" in English

The Aegis ballistic missile defense system (Aegis BMD or ABMD), also known as Sea-Based Midcourse, is a Missile Defense Agency program under the United States Department of Defense developed to provide missile defense against short- and intermediate-range ballistic missiles. The program is part of the United States national missile defense strategy and European NATO missile defense system.

Aegis BMD is an expansion of the Aegis Combat System deployed on warships, designed to intercept ballistic missiles in mid-course phase (i.e., after the rocket burn has completed but prior to reentry into the atmosphere). Aegis BMD-equipped vessels can engage potential threats using the Standard Missile 3 mid-course interceptors and the Standard Missile 2 and Standard Missile 6 terminal-phase interceptors. As of 2025, there are two Aegis Ashore sites in Romania since 2016 and Poland since 2024, each holds 24 SM-3 missiles.

In 2008, Aegis BMD was tested as an anti-satellite weapon, destroying satellite USA-193 at an altitude of 144 nautical miles (267 km), codenamed Operation Burnt Frost.

== History and technical development ==
=== Origins ===
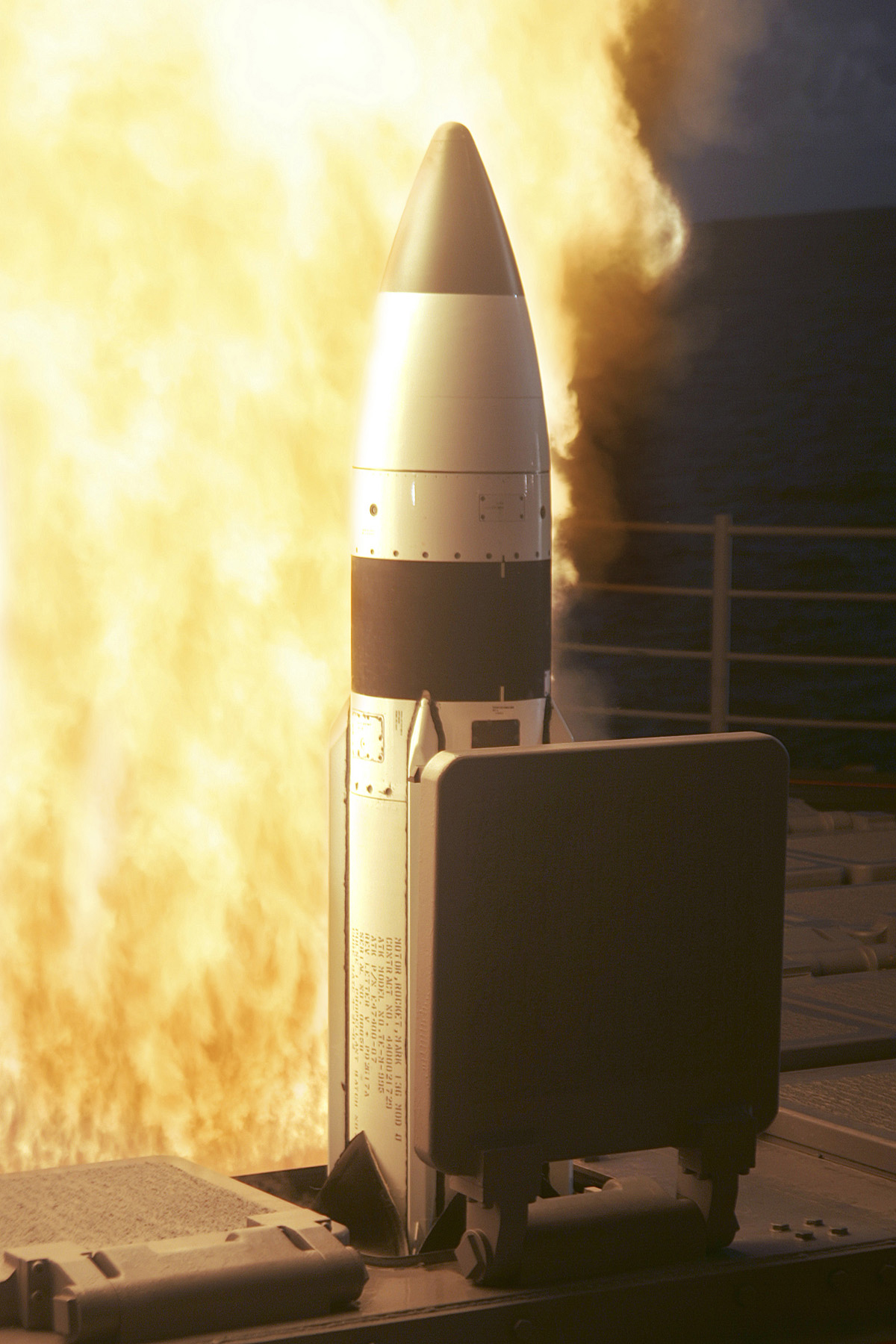
Standard Missile 3 (SM-3) is launched from cruiser USS Lake Erie in November 2005

The current effort to deploy Aegis ballistic missile defense (ABMD) was begun during the mid-1980s as part of President Ronald Reagan's Strategic Defense Initiative (SDI). The SDI plan was initially for a space-based railgun system. However, technological constraints caused the system to be transformed into a surface-based system known as the Lightweight Exo-Atmospheric Projectile (LEAP). The original testing of the LEAP was done as part of the Army LEAP program.

Later, SDIO worked with the Navy to test the LEAP on the Terrier missile. The Terrier LEAP demonstration program lasted from 1991 into 1995 and consisted of four flight tests. Two of these were intercept tests in early 1995; both failed to intercept—the first had a software error in the second-stage booster, the second had a squib (pyrotechnic switch to connect power) in the kinetic kill vehicle that was mounted backwards and failed to fire.

=== Program history and development ===
During the late 1990s, the U.S. Navy was tasked to provide a weapon system for exploratory testing of LEAP. This phase was designated the Aegis LEAP Intercept (ALI) program. The program was for two successful intercepts in five attempts. On June 13, 2002, the second successful ALI intercept occurred during the FM-3 flight test mission. Initial Aegis BMD success may have contributed to President George W. Bush's decision to deploy an emergency ballistic missile capability by late 2004.

Upon the completion of the ALI program, Aegis BMD was transitioned to the production phase. The first Block I production SM-3 was delivered in October 2004, and the Aegis 3.0 update was delivered in 2005.

This system was given major new importance by President Obama in September 2009, when he announced plans to scrap the plans for a missile defense site in Poland in favor of missile defense systems located on U.S. Navy warships. On 18 September 2009, Russian Prime Minister Vladimir Putin welcomed Obama's plans for missile defense which may include stationing American Aegis armed warships in the Black Sea, as these are likely to be less effective against Russia's missile attacks. In 2009 several U.S. Navy ships were fitted with SM-3 missiles to serve this function, which complements the Patriot systems already deployed by American units. Warships of Japan and Australia also have been given weapons and technology to enable them to participate as well.

Current Aegis BMD hardware includes the SM-3 Block-1a missile and other improvements to the Aegis Weapons System. Future development of the Aegis BMD system includes Launch on Remote capability, upgraded SM-3 avionics and hardware, and an upgraded Aegis Weapon System. In 2012 Aegis Ballistic Missile Defense will merge with Aegis Open Architecture and deliver the benefits of both platforms. The Launch on Remote capability involves the use of off-board sensors, such as the Space Tracking and Surveillance System to provide a targeting solution for a SM-3 launch.

As of 2022, variations of the Aegis BMD system currently in service are the 4.x, 5.x and 6.x. The improved versions are equipped with advanced processors and software, as well as upgraded variants of the SM-3 interceptor missile. BMD capable ships can have their BMD capabilities upgraded from earlier versions to later versions. BMD version 6.x comes with AN/SPY-6 radar in Flight III and Flight IIA destroyers.

US Army Integrated Air and Missile Defense Battle Command System (IBCS) program will integrate MIM-104 Patriot, NASAMS, AN/TPY-2 and F-35 Lightning II radars with Aegis radars to create a plug-and-fight network of land, sea, and air-based sensors and aid surface-to-air Patriot and THAAD launchers in anti-ballistic missile capabilities.

=== SM-3, SM-2 Block IV, SM-6 and GPI interceptors ===
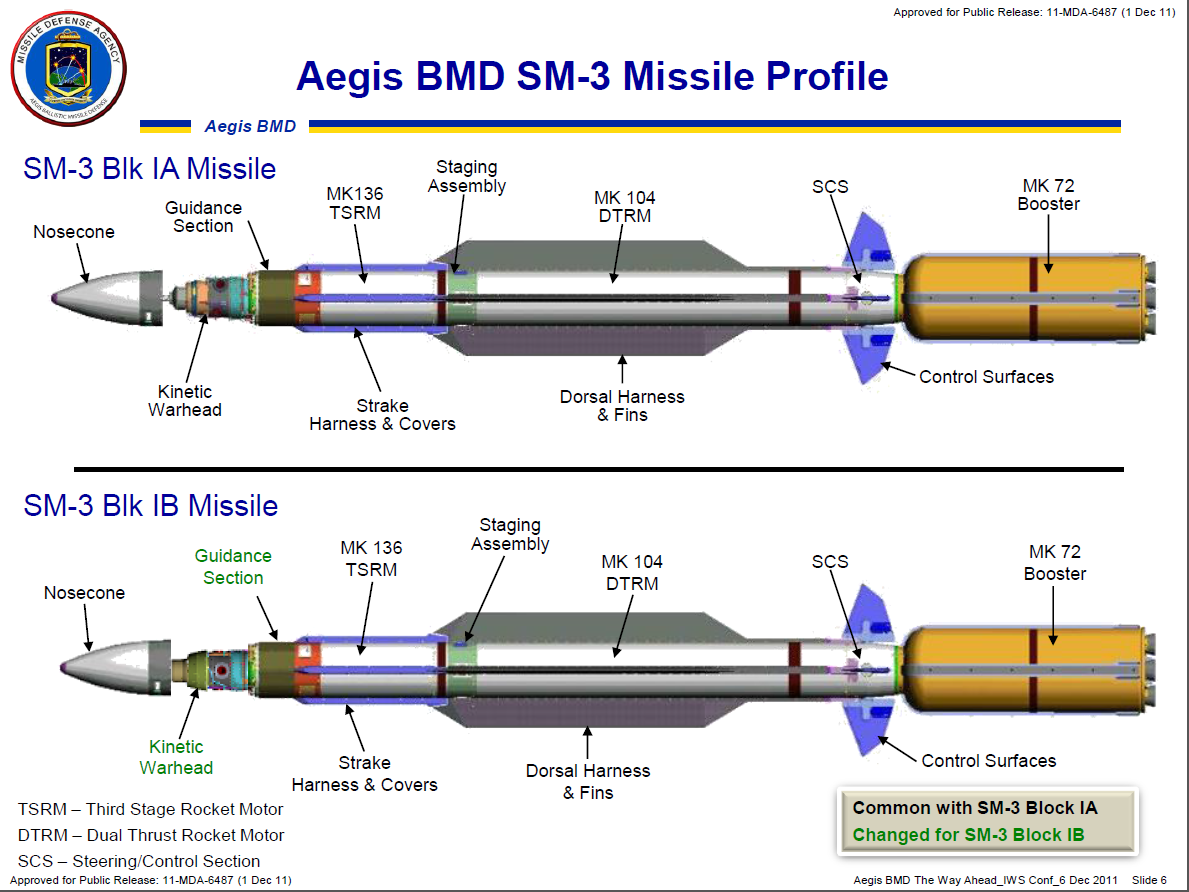
SM-3 Interceptor profile

The Aegis BMD uses the RIM-161 Standard Missile 3 mid-course interceptors and the RIM-156 Standard Extended Range Block IV (SM-2ER Block IV) terminal-phase interceptors developed by Raytheon. The Standard Missile 3 is a development of the SM2-ER Block IV, capable of intercepting ballistic missiles above the atmosphere (i.e., exo-atmospheric intercept) during the midcourse phase of a hostile ballistic missile's flight. The missile is launched from the Mk 41 Vertical Launching System (VLS) of the warships. It receives in-flight target updates from the ship. The kinetic warhead (KW) is designed to destroy a ballistic missile's warhead with more than 130 megajoules of kinetic energy by colliding with it. The existing SM-3 Block IA version will be upgraded to SM-3 Block IB, SM-3 Block IIA and SM-3 Block IIB to counter future ballistic missile threats.

The SM-2ER Block IV can engage the ballistic missiles within the atmosphere (i.e., endoatmospheric intercept) in the terminal phase of a missile's trajectory. The missile carries a blast fragmentation warhead. The SM-2ER Block IV was further developed in a new extended range active missile, RIM-174 Standard ERAM (Standard Missile 6), which adds an active radar homing seeker. SM-6 is a dual-capability missile that can be used for either air defense (i.e., countering aircraft and anti-ship cruise missiles) or terminal ballistic missile defense; it is not meant to replace the SM-2 series of missiles, but will serve alongside and provide extended range and increased firepower. In January 2018 the Navy approved plans to develop a Dual Thrust Rocket Motor for the SM-6, with a larger 21-inch diameter to replace the current 13.5-inch propulsion package. The new rocket motor would sit atop the current 21-inch booster, producing a new variant of the missile: the SM-6 Block IB.

In March 2018 the MDA announced that it "is evaluating the technical feasibility of the capability of the SM-3 Block IIA missile, currently under development, against an ICBM-class target. If proven to be effective against an ICBM, this missile could add a layer of protection, augmenting the currently deployed GMD system." The MDA planned to conduct a demonstration of the SM-3 Block IIA against an ICBM-like target by the end of 2020. On November 17, 2020, an SM-3 Block IIA missile successfully intercepted a threat-representative intercontinental ballistic missile (ICBM) target in its mid-course phase of flight, reaffirming the capability to intercept non-separating, simple separating, and complex-separating ballistic missiles.

Glide Phase Interceptor (GPI) will provide defense against hypersonic weapons. Glide Phase Interceptor will be integrated with modified Baseline 9 Aegis Weapon System.

In 2024, the Patriot PAC-3 was successfully tested with the Aegis system.

=== Aegis Ashore ===
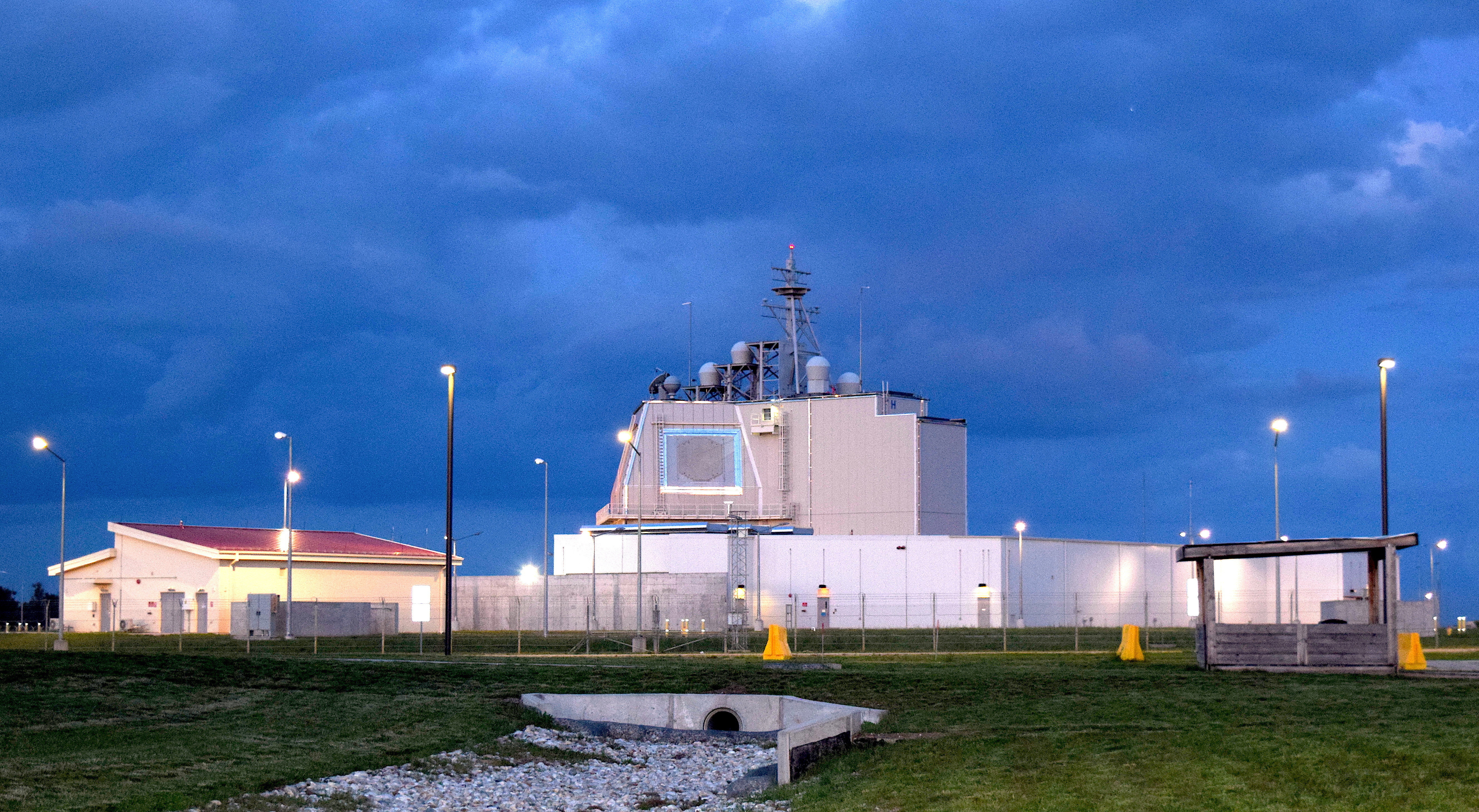
NATO's Aegis Ashore Ballistic Missile Defense System (AABMDS) site in Romania

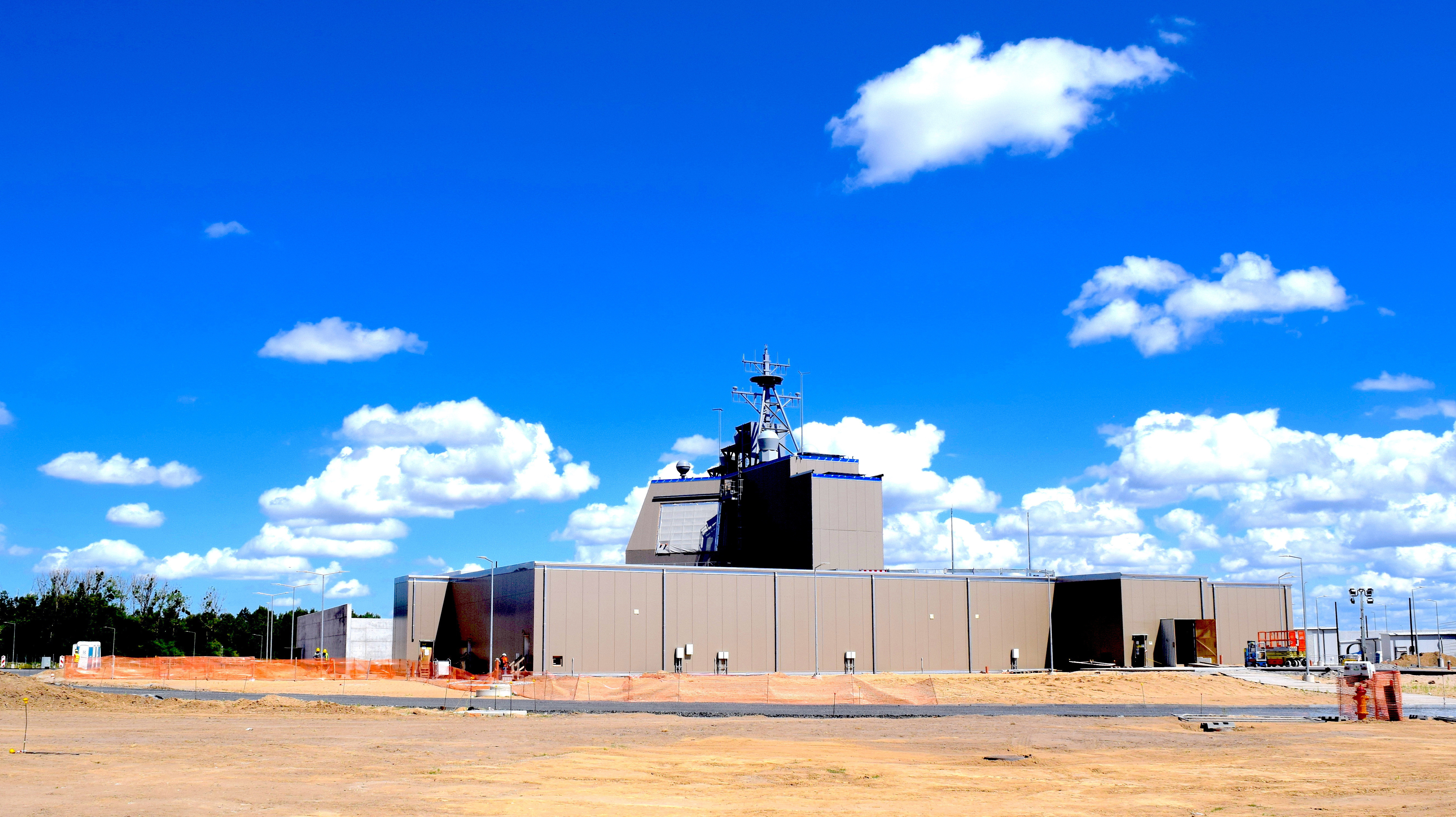
NATO's Aegis Ashore Ballistic Missile Defense System (AABMDS) site in Redzikowo, Poland

As of the 2014 NATO Wales summit a land-based component, Aegis Ashore, was being developed. The first site to be declared operational was Deveselu, Romania in 2016. This consists of equipment commonly used by the Navy being deployed in land-based facilities. This includes SPY-1 radars and a battery of Standard Missile-3s. The Obama administration's plan calls for two sites: the first in Romania at Deveselu that was opened in May 2015, and the second in Redzikowo, Poland (originally planned for 2018, opened in summer 2024). In 2020, both will get the latest versions of the Aegis BMD software and the latest version of the SM-3. Some radar facilities will be placed in Turkey at a future date.

On 21 May 2014, U.S. DOD headlined "Standard Missile Completes First Test Launch from Aegis Ashore Test Site" and reported that "The Missile Defense Agency, the U.S. Navy, and sailors at the Aegis Ashore Missile Defense Test Complex and Pacific Missile Range Facility (PMRF), successfully conducted the first flight test involving components of the Aegis Ashore system. During the test, a simulated ballistic missile target was acquired, tracked, and engaged by the Aegis Weapon System. At approximately 7:35 p.m. Hawaii Standard Time, May 20 (1:35 a.m. EDT, May 21), the Aegis Weapon System fired a Standard Missile (SM)-3 Block IB guided missile from the Vertical Launch System. Several fire control and engagement functions were exercised during the test. A live target missile launch was not planned for this flight test."

On 19 December 2017, the Cabinet of Japan approved a plan to purchase two Aegis Ashore systems equipped with the AN/SPY-7(V)1, based on Lockheed Martin's LRDR to increase Japan's self-defence capability against North Korea, using SM-3 Block IIA missiles, and also could work with SM-6 interceptors capable of shooting down cruise missiles. The installation sites are at a Ground Self-Defense Force training area in Araya District, Akita Prefecture and the Mutsumi training area in Hagi, Yamaguchi Prefecture.

On 15 June 2020, Japanese Defense Minister Taro Kono announced that work had been halted on the deployment of the system because additional costs would be needed to ensure that residential buildings would not be hit by rocket boosters used to launch the missiles. Later in the month Japan's National Security Council confirmed the cancellation of the plan. On 23 September 2020, Lockheed Martin commented that it would be expensive to potentially convert the AA system for maritime use since a revamp in the design is required.

In July 2020 Admiral Philip S. Davidson, the head of United States Indo-Pacific Command advised that he sought funding to construct an Aegis Ashore system in Guam by 2026 both to defend existing U.S. military facilities on Guam and to provide offensive "long-range precision strike capability into the First Island Chain" dominated by China. Speaking in March 2021, Davidson said that the "Guam Defense System" of an Aegis Ashore Facility would free up three Arleigh Burke-class destroyers for service elsewhere. Davidson said that Chinese submarines and surface ships together with its ballistic missiles pose "a 360-degree threat" to Guam beyond the capabilities of the existing Terminal High Altitude Area Defense system on Guam.

=== Developers and contractors ===
Notable subcontractors and technical experts include Boeing Defense, Space & Security, Alliant Techsystems (ATK), Honeywell, Engility, Naval Surface Warfare Center, SPAWAR Systems Center, Johns Hopkins University Applied Physics Laboratory (JHU/APL), and the Massachusetts Institute of Technology Lincoln Laboratory (Lincoln Lab).

== Deployment ==
=== Aegis Ashore ===
The U.S., Romania and Poland have deployed the land based Aegis BMD. Test installation was built at the US Pacific Missile Range Facility in Hawaii in 2000s. A site in Deveselu, Romania has been operational since 2016, while a site at Redzikowo, Poland has been operational since the summer of 2024. Each holds 24 SM-3 missiles. Though Japan intended to deploy two sites which would use an AN/SPY-7 AESA radar, these plans were cancelled in 2020. Possible deployments of Aegis Ashore include US Naval Base Guam.

=== U.S. Navy Aegis BMD vessels ===
As of October 2017, there were 5 Ticonderoga-class cruisers and 28 Arleigh Burke-class destroyers (DDGs 51–78) of the US Navy's Arleigh Burke-class destroyers equipped with BMD in the U.S. Navy. Of the 33 ships, 17 are assigned to the Pacific Fleet and 16 to the Atlantic Fleet. The Navy's FY2015 30-year (FY2015-FY2043) shipbuilding plan projects that the total number of Aegis cruisers and destroyers will be between 80 and 97 during the 30-year period.

USS Carney (DDG-64), USS Ross (DDG-71), and USS Donald Cook (DDG-75) were upgraded in fiscal year 2012, while USS Cole (DDG-67), USS McFaul (DDG-74) and USS Porter (DDG-78) were upgraded in fiscal year 2013.

=== Japanese Aegis BMD vessels ===
The JMSDF has equipped four ships of the Kongo-class destroyers for LRST and engagement: JS Kongo, JS Chokai, JS Myoko, and the JS Kirishima (in 2010) (See table below). Japan's foreign minister, Hirofumi Nakasone and South Korea's Minister of Foreign Affairs, Yu Myung-hwan, agreed that early April 5, 2009, launch of the North Korean Unha-2 satellite violated UN resolutions 1695 and 1718 of July 2006. Japan's cabinet examined approval of a JMSDF AEGIS BMD engagement in the event of a failure of the Taepondong launch. The Japanese government also noted that it could bypass cabinet for an interception under Article 82, Section 2, Paragraph 3 of the Self-Defence Forces law. In total, five AEGIS destroyers were deployed at that time. Supplemental to SM-3 capability the Japanese system incorporates an airborne component. Together discrimination between platform tests and satellite launches is possible by analyzing the angle of ascent.

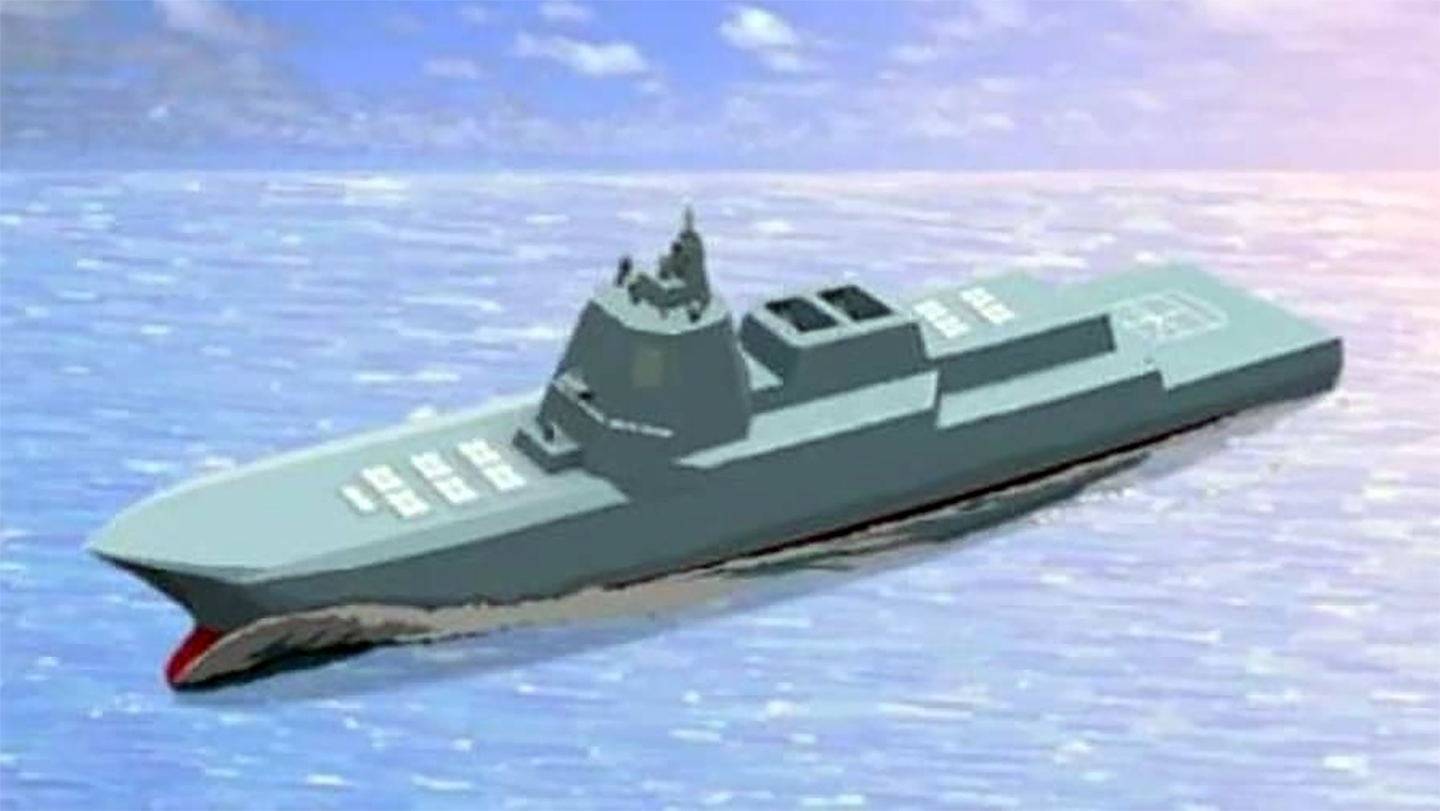
Artist's impression of future BMD ship

On August 31, 2022, the Japan Ministry of Defense announced that JMSDF will operate two "Aegis system equipped ships" (イージス・システム搭載艦 in Japanese) to replace its earlier cancellation of the Aegis Ashore program, commissioning one ship by the end of fiscal year 2027, and the other by the end of FY2028. The budget for design and other related expenses are to be submitted in the form of "item requests", without specific amounts, and the initial procurement of the lead items are expected to clear legislation by FY2023. Construction is to begin in the following year of FY2024. When completed, at 20,000 long tons (20,000 t) each, the two warships will be the largest surface combatant ships operated by Japan.

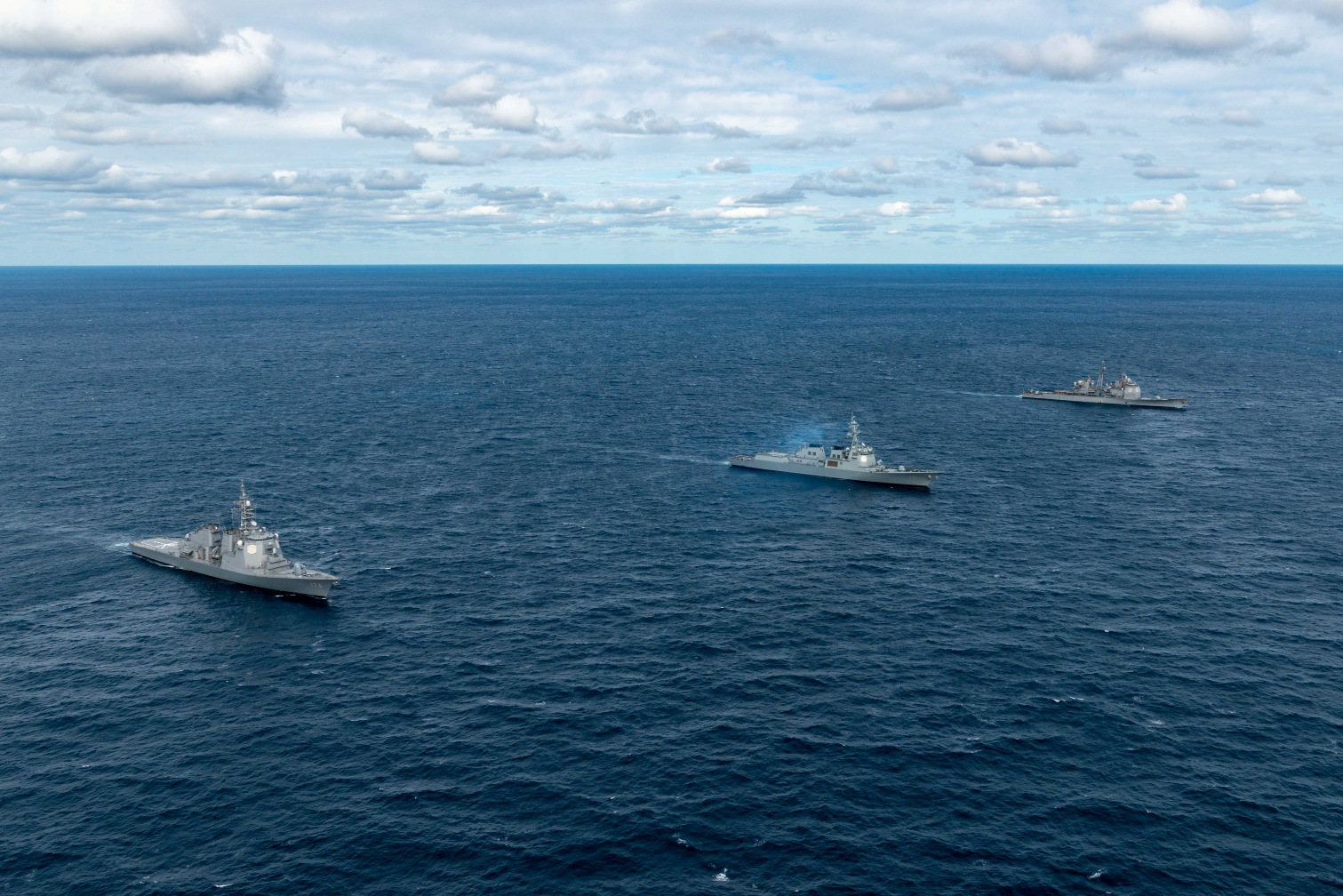
BMD maneuvers (October 6, 2022)

On 6 October 2022, five warships from the United States, Japan, and South Korea held a multilateral ballistic missile defense exercise in the Sea of Japan as part of the military response to ongoing North Korean intermediate-range ballistic missile tests over the Japanese home islands.

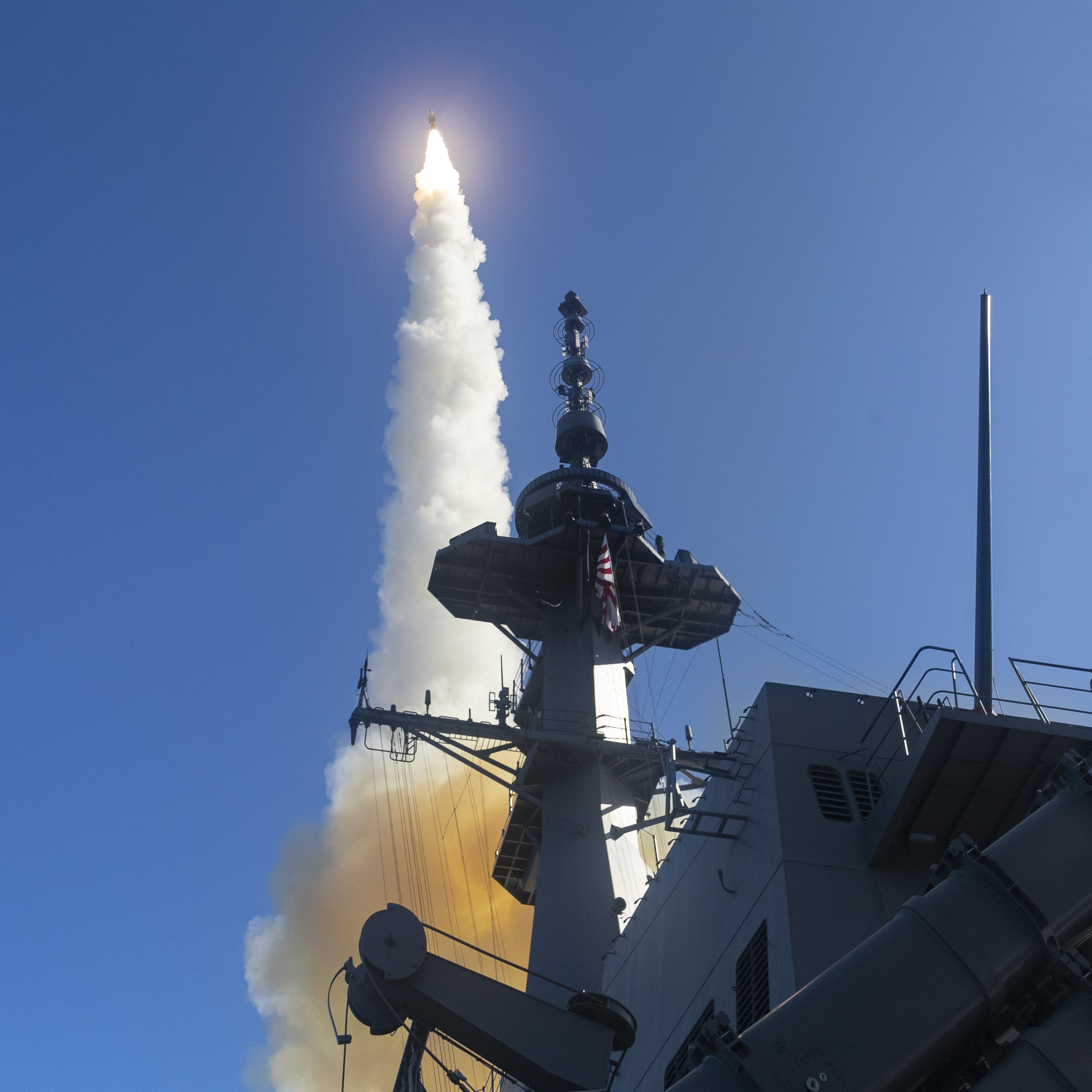
JS Haguro (DDG-180) launching SM-3 Block IB missile (November 19, 2022)

On 16 November 2022, the guided-missile destroyer Maya fired an SM-3 Block IIA missile, successfully intercepting the target outside the atmosphere in the first launch of the missile from a Japanese warship. On 18 November 2022, the Haguro likewise fired an SM-3 Block IB missile with a successful hit outside the atmosphere. Both test firings were conducted at the U.S. Pacific Missile Range Facility on Kauaʻi Island, Hawaii, in cooperation with the U.S. Navy and U.S. Missile Defense Agency. This was the first time the two ships conducted SM-3 firings in the same time period, and the tests validated the ballistic missile defense capabilities of Japan's newest Maya-class destroyers.

On 23 December 2022, the Japanese Ministry of Defense's 2023 budget and program guidance illustrated examples of operation (運用の一例) for the Aegis-equipped naval forces of the Japanese Maritime Self Defense Force (MSDF). The two ASEV warship would be exclusively tasked for dedicated ballistic missile defense (BDM) missions (BMD等) and operate off the Korean peninsula in the Sea of Japan, allowing the other Aegis guided-missile destroyers to meet other contingencies (侵攻阻止) while operating independently to keeping the sea lines of communication (SLOC) open in the East China Sea southwest of the Japanese home islands.

List of JMSDF Aegis Afloat ships (Aegis BMD vessels)
Name	Hull pennant No.	Builder/shipyard	Aegis radar	Anti-ballistic missile	Vertical launchers	Commissioned	Home port	Flotilla	Squadron	Status
Maya class
JS Maya	DDG-179	JMU, Yokohama	AN/SPY-1D(V)	SM-3 Standard missile	Mark 41: 96 cells (total)	19 March 2020	Yokosuka	Escort Flotilla 1	Escort Squadron 1	Active
JS Haguro	DDG-180	JMU, Yokohama	AN/SPY-1D(V)	SM-3 Standard missile	Mark 41: 96 cells (total)	19 March 2021	Sasebo	Escort Flotilla 4	Escort Squadron 8	Active
Atago class
JDS Atago	DDG-177	JMU, Yokohama	AN/SPY-1D(V)	SM-3 Standard missile	Mark 41: 96 cells (total)	15 March 2007	Maizuru	Escort Flotilla 3	Escort Squadron 3	Active
JDS Ashigara	DDG-178	JMU, Yokohama	AN/SPY-1D(V)	SM-3 Standard missile	Mark 41: 96 cells (total)	13 March 2008	Sasebo	Escort Flotilla 2	Escort Squadron 2	Active
Kongō class
Kongō	DDG-173	Mitsubishi Heavy Industries	AN/SPY-1D PESA	SM-3 Standard missile	Mark 41: 90 cells (total)	25 March 1993	Sasebo	Escort Flotilla 1	Escort Squadron 5:	Active
Kirishima	DDG-174	Mitsubishi Heavy Industries	AN/SPY-1D PESA	SM-3 Standard missile	Mark 41: 90 cells (total)	16 March 1995	Yokosuka	Escort Flotilla 2	Escort Squadron 6	Active
Myōkō	DDG-175	Mitsubishi Heavy Industries	AN/SPY-1D PESA	SM-3 Standard missile	Mark 41: 90 cells (total)	14 March 1996	Maizuru	Escort Flotilla 3	Escort Squadron 3	Active
Chōkai	DDG-176	IHI Corporation	AN/SPY-1D PESA	SM-3 Standard missile	Mark 41: 90 cells (total)	20 March 1998	Sasebo	Escort Flotilla 4	Escort Squadron 8	Active

=== Joint BMD patrols ===
In early October 2022, five warships from the United States, Japan, and South Korea held a ballistic missile defense exercise (pictured) in the Sea of Japan as part of the ongoing military response to ongoing North Korean intermediate-range ballistic missile tests over the Japanese home islands.

== Political debate ==
Tom Laliberty of Raytheon said that President Barack Obama was forced to shift from a land based missile defense system to a sea based one because of the difficulties of coordinating with partner nations. Also, the U.S. Defense Department has said it would be just one component of a wider defense which might also include ground-based facilities.

A Navy panel headed by retired Vice Adm. Phillip Balisle has asserted that since the late 1990s there has been an over-emphasis on saving money, including cuts in crews and streamlined training and maintenance, which has led to a drastic decline in readiness, and has left Aegis combat systems in low state of readiness. And in spite of a reduction in the objective for the number of Aegis armed warships to field, the U.S. Navy will still fall short of this reduced objective under the fiscal year for 2012 shipbuilding plan for the next 30 years.

== International reaction ==
The Russian government has claimed that the system is "fueling a new arms race", and is constructed "on ridiculous fabricated pretexts" of protection against non-existent threats of the so-called rogue states. Dmitry Rogozin, the Deputy Prime Minister of the Russian government, said in 2012 that the country would "react in the sharpest manner" to any American ships armed with the system found near their shores.

== Other capabilities ==
In 2008, Aegis BMD was tested as an anti-satellite weapon, destroying satellite USA-193, codenamed Operation Burnt Frost. The RIM-161 Standard missile (SM-3), has also demonstrated this capability in the lower portion of low Earth orbit. On February 20, USA 193 was destroyed by a group of Aegis ships in the Pacific; the stated reason was concern that satellite's hydrazine payload might contaminate land area upon re-entry from an uncontrolled orbit. The launching vessel was USS Lake Erie, and one SM-3 missile was used. Interception was at an altitude of 133 nautical miles (247 kilometers). The operation was widely believed to be in response to the 2007 Chinese anti-satellite missile test.

== Target for simulating endo-atmospheric flight of DF-21 ASBM ==
According to a Congressional Research Service report dated July 31, 2014, the lack of a test target simulating the Chinese DF-21 ASBM is highlighted.

A threat representative Anti-Ship Ballistic Missile (ASBM) target for operational open-air testing has become an immediate test resource need. China is fielding the DF-21D ASBM, which threatens U.S. and allied surface warships in the Western Pacific. While the Missile Defense Agency has exo-atmospheric targets in development, no program currently exists for an endo-atmospheric target. The endo-atmospheric ASBM target is the Navy's responsibility, but it is not currently budgeted. The Missile Defense Agency estimates the non-recurring expense to develop the exo-atmospheric target was $30 million with each target costing an additional $30 million; the endo-atmospheric target will be more expensive to produce according to missile defense analysts. Numerous Navy acquisition programs will require an ASBM surrogate in the coming years, although a limited number of targets (3-5) may be sufficient to validate analytical models

The December 2012 report from DOT&E (i.e., DOT&E's annual report for FY2012) did not further discuss this issue; a January 21, 2013, press report stated that this is because the details of the issue are classified.

The U.S. arsenal has a "variety of potential countermeasures" and the "kill chain" of for example a potential DF-21D attack would be so "complicated" that it would provide a "number of opportunities to defeat the attack". Roger Cliff also stated that unless one country integrates an "entire system of systems" to make this work, the missile itself would be pretty "useless".

Some countries might buy them just to impress their neighbors, but their combat effectiveness would be negligible unless the country also invested in the needed detection, data processing, and communications systems.

A December 16, 2016, press report states the following:

The Missile Defense Agency (MDA) said its new Sea Based Terminal (SBT) system achieved its second ballistic missile intercept during a Dec. 14 test over the Pacific Ocean.

During the test, the USS John Paul Jones (DDG-53) ... fired a salvo of two Raytheon [RTN] Standard Missile-6 (SM-6) interceptors in immediate succession against a medium-range ballistic missile target launched from the Pacific Missile Range Facility on Kauaʻi, Hawaii. The first interceptor was not armed and was designed to collect test data, MDA said. The second interceptor, which carried an explosive warhead, intercepted the Lockheed Martin-built target.

MDA called the target "complex" but declined to elaborate. However, according to the Missile Defense Advocacy Alliance, the target emulated China's Dong-Feng 21 (DF-21), a ballistic missile equipped with a maneuverable re-entry vehicle and designed to destroy U.S., aircraft carriers. The event, designated Flight Test Standard Missile-27 (FTM-27), was SBT's first salvo test and its second intercept in as many tries.

In March 2020, Mike Griffin, the Under Secretary of Defense for Research and Engineering, revealed that SM-6 missile was being considered for hypersonic defense and that there are plans to test it against an actual hypersonic boost-glide vehicle in the 2023 Fiscal Year.

An April 14, 2021 press report stated:

The Missile Defense Agency, together with the U.S. Navy, plan to test an SM-6 missile against an "advanced maneuvering threat", a term that has been used in relation to unpowered hypersonic boost-glide vehicles, later this year. The Pentagon says that unspecified versions of the SM-6 have already demonstrated some degree of capability against these types of weapons, examples of which Russia and China have already begun putting to service. A new variant of the SM-6, the Block IB, is already under development and will itself be able to reach hypersonic speeds. Barbara McQuiston, a senior U.S. official currently performing the duties of the Under Secretary of Defense for Research and Engineering, including mention of the scheduled SM-6 test in her testimony before the Senate Appropriations Committee's Subcommittee on Defense yesterday.

== Flight tests to date ==
As of December 2024, Aegis BMDS has performed 46 successful intercepts in 55 attempts against ballistic missile targets.

Name	Date	Result	Description
CTV-1	Sep 26, 1997	Failure	The first flight test for the Navy Theater Wide program's Control Test Vehicle-1 (CTV-1) was on September 26, 1997, using a SM-2 Block IV missile modified for exo-atmospheric flight and launched from USS Russell. The missile self-destructed soon after launch after veering off course. The root cause of this problem was a defect in the Navy's existing SM-2 Block IV ordnance, not any guidance modifications for high-altitude flight. The Navy and BMDO thus characterized the flight as a "No-Test".
CTV-1A	Sep 24, 1999	Success	The next flight for Raytheon's SM-3 came on September 24, 1999, during Control Test Vehicle (CTV)-1A (Codename: Stellar Phoenix). CTV-1a was a test of the first and second stage of the SM-3. The mission was considered a success. USS Shiloh was the launching ship.
FTR-1	Jul 8, 2000	Failure	The next mission was conducted in July 2000 and designated Flight Test Round (FTR-1) (Codename: Stellar Archer). This mission ended in failure when the Third Stage Rocket Motor (TSRM) failed to separate from the second stage. USS Shiloh was the launching ship.
FTR-1A	Jan 25, 2001	Success	FTR-1a (Codename: Stellar Gemini) was conducted on January 25, 2001. This mission would be the first time a live unitary target was engaged by the Aegis BMD system. The test target was launched from the U.S. Navy's Pacific Missile Range Facility located on the Hawaiian island of Kauaʻi. FTR-1a would demonstrate exo-atmospheric avionics operation of the SM-3 Kinetic Warhead (KW) and the real-time performance of the Aegis BMD AN/SPY-1 radar. At the time this test was conducted, the KW's propulsion system, the Solid Divert and Attitude Control System (SDACS), was still being developed. Total system operation was demonstrated in FM-2. The mission was considered successful when the KW acquired and tracked the test target for several seconds. USS Lake Erie was the launching ship.
FM-2	Jan 25, 2002	Success	The purpose of Flight Mission (FM)-2 (codename: Stellar Eagle) was to characterize the Aegis Weapon System and Standard Missile 3 interceptor. The mission was not required to intercept the target. On January 25, 2002, an SM-3 launched from USS Lake Erie collided with a test target northeast of the island of Kauaʻi. This mission was the first interception of a ballistic missile from a sea-based platform.
FM-3	Jun 13, 2002	Success	Aegis BMD succeeded in intercepting a unitary target missiles launched from PMRF during FM-3 (Codename: Stellar Impact). USS Lake Erie was the firing ship. This mission marked the successful completion of the Aegis LEAP Intercept program. June 13, 2002 was also the date that the United States withdrew from the Anti-Ballistic Missile Treaty (ABM Treaty), which limited the development of a strategic anti-ballistic missile system (to be considered strategic Aegis would need capability against the current Russian ICBMs and SLBMs).
FM-4	Nov 21, 2001	Success	Aegis BMD intercepted a unitary ballistic missile during FM-4 (codename: Stellar Viper). FM-4 was the first Aegis BMD test to conduct the "aimpoint shift" maneuver. The aimpoint shift increases the probability that the ballistic missile ordnance will be destroyed at intercept. USS Lake Erie was the launching ship.
FM-5	Jun 18, 2003	Failure	On June 18, 2003, the FM-5 mission (codename: Stellar Hammer) resulted in the first test failure of an operational Aegis BMD system. During the test, the SDACS propulsion system used to guide the SM-3's kinetic warhead suffered a malfunction after ignition. Prior to the rocket motor failure, the SM-3 kinetic warhead was on an intercept course with the test target. USS Lake Erie was the firing ship.
FM-6	Dec 11, 2003	Success	The next mission, Codename: Stellar Defender, implemented a modification to the SDACS design so as not to endanger the warhead's ability to intercept. This override allowed the KW to navigate with reduced (but no less lethal) capability. FM-6 once again featured a successful interception. USS Lake Erie was the firing ship.
FTM-04-1	Feb 24, 2005	Success	After the FM-6 mission, the Missile Defense Agency implemented a change to the flight test naming convention for all subsequent ABMD flight tests. According to MDA the new convention better reflected the program's position within the Block 2004/2006 schema of development. The new name, Flight Test Mission (FTM) 04-1 (codename: Stellar Dragon), indicated that this would be the first flight test under the Block 2004 development cycle for Aegis BMD. The flight test demonstrated yet again the system's ability to destroy an enemy ballistic missile. USS Lake Erie was the firing ship.
FTM-04-2	Nov 17, 2005	Success	Codename Stellar Valkyrie, this was the first mission to utilize a target missile with a separating warhead. This new target missile, termed a Medium Range Target (MRT) more closely resembled real world threat missiles, but the SM-3 Block I missile was not fooled and intercepted the warhead to score the sixth interception for the program out of seven tries on November 17, 2005. USS Lake Erie was the firing ship.
FTM-10	Jun 23, 2006	Success	The FTM-10 test target was the MRT with a separating warhead. USS Shiloh was the launching ship and utilized the Aegis Weapon System version 3.6 for the first time. This test was the first to feature the latest model of the SM-3, the Block Ia. The mission was considered a success when the KW tracked, selected and intercepted the MRT reentry vehicle (RV). FTM-10 marked the first time another country participated in a sea-based anti-ballistic missile exercise. The Japanese government was interested in purchasing a system similar to Aegis BMD to deter potential threats and was invited to participate in the FTM-10 exercise. The Japanese naval vessel JDS Kirishima (a Kongō-class destroyer) was stationed off the coast of PMRF and observed all FTM-10 events.
FTM-11	Dec 7, 2006	Failure	The Aegis Weapon System failed to engage the test target and never launched the interceptor. The cause of the failure, an on-board error, was discovered and corrected prior to the retest of FTM-11 test flight. USS Lake Erie was the firing ship.
FTM-11 Event 4	Apr 26, 2007	Success	Aegis BMD successfully intercepted its eighth target in ten attempts. This test marked the 27th successful "Hit-to-Kill" intercept (for all MDA systems) since 2001. USS Lake Erie was the launching ship and utilized the Aegis 3.6 Weapon System. The interceptor was the SM-3 Block-Ia. This test not only demonstrated the ability of ABMD to intercept a ballistic missile but also demonstrated Lake Erie's ability to simultaneously track and intercept antiship missiles. This test also utilized the Solid Divert and Attitude Control System (SDACS), in the full pulse configuration.
FTM-11A	Aug 31, 2007	Success	Classified flight test.
FTM-12	Jun 22, 2007	Success	USS Decatur, using the operationally certified Aegis Ballistic Missile Defense Weapon System (BMD 3.6) and the Standard Missile 3 (SM-3) Block IA missile, successfully performed a "hit to kill" intercept of a separating, medium range, ballistic missile. The target missile was launched from the Pacific Missile Range Facility on Kauaʻi, Hawaii. The Ticonderoga-class cruiser USS Port Royal, Spain's Álvaro de Bazán-class frigate Méndez Núñez, and MDA's Terminal High Altitude Area Defense (THAAD) mobile ground-based radar also participated in the flight test. FTM-12 (Codename: Stellar Athena) was the first to use an Arleigh Burke-class destroyer as the launching ship.
FTM-13	Nov 6, 2007	Success	USS Lake Erie launched two interceptors off the island of Kauaʻi, Hawaii, engaging two short-range ballistic missile targets almost simultaneously.
FTM-14	Jun 6, 2008	Success	USS Lake Erie successfully intercepted a terminal phase target with a modified SM-2 Block IV interceptor. The aim of this mission was to test the interception and destruction of a short range ballistic missile target launched from a mobile launch platform.
FTM-15	Apr 15, 2011	Success	The Missile Defense Agency (MDA), USS O'Kane, and the 94th Army Air and Missile Defense Command operating from the 613th Air and Space Operations Center at Hickam Air Force Base, Hawaii, successfully conducted a flight test of the Aegis Ballistic Missile Defense (BMD) element of the nation's Ballistic Missile Defense System, resulting in the intercept of a separating ballistic missile target over the Pacific Ocean. FTM-15, was the most challenging test to date, as it was the first Aegis BMD version 3.6.1 intercept against an intermediate-range target (range 1,864 to 3,418 miles) and the first Aegis BMD 3.6.1 engagement relying on remote tracking data. The ability to use remote radar data to engage a threat ballistic missile greatly increases the battle space and defended area of the SM-3 missile.
FTM-16 Event 1	Mar 15, 2011	Success	USS Lake Erie successfully tracked a ballistic missile target. In addition to the BMD mission, Lake Erie also validated the ship's anti-air warfare (AAW) capability by destroying an incoming anti-ship cruise missile target with an SM-2 Block III missile in a live firing exercise. This was the first event in which a ship used BMD 4.0.1 Weapon System to engage an AAW threat.
FTM-16 Event 2	Sep 1, 2011	Failure	A short-range ballistic missile target was launched from the U.S. Navy's Pacific Missile Range Facility on Kauaʻi, Hawaii. Approximately 90 seconds later, a Standard Missile 3 (SM-3) Block 1B interceptor missile was launched from USS Lake Erie but an intercept of the target was not achieved. The failure was due to a third-stage rocket motor pulse failure.
FTM-16 Event 2A	May 9, 2012	Success	USS Lake Erie successfully conducted a flight test of the Aegis Ballistic Missile Defense (BMD) system, resulting in the first intercept of a short-range ballistic missile target over the Pacific Ocean by the Navy's newest Missile Defense interceptor, the Standard Missile 3 (SM-3) Block IB.
FTM-17	Jul 30, 2009	Success	USS Hopper, detected, tracked, fired and guided a Standard Missile 3 (SM-3) Block (Blk) IA to intercept a sub-scale short range ballistic missile.
FTM-18	Jun 27, 2012	Success	USS Lake Erie successfully conducted a flight test of the Aegis Ballistic Missile Defense (BMD) system, resulting in the intercept of a separating ballistic missile target over the Pacific Ocean by the Navy's newest missile defense interceptor missile, the Standard Missile 3 (SM-3) Block IB. The test event was the second consecutive successful intercept test of the SM-3 Block IB missile and the second-generation Aegis BMD 4.0.1 weapon system. The first successful SM-3 Block IB intercept occurred on May 9, 2012.
FTM-19	May 16, 2013	Success	USS Lake Erie successfully conducted a flight test today of the Aegis Ballistic Missile Defense (BMD) system, resulting in the intercept of a separating ballistic missile target over the Pacific Ocean by the Aegis BMD 4.0 Weapon System and a Standard Missile 3 (SM-3) Block IB missile. This test exercised the latest version of the second-generation Aegis BMD Weapon System and Standard Missile, providing capability for engagement of longer-range and more sophisticated ballistic missiles.
FTM-20	Feb 13, 2013	Success	USS Lake Erie successfully conducted a flight test of the Aegis Ballistic Missile Defense (BMD) system, resulting in the intercept of a medium-range ballistic missile target over the Pacific Ocean by a Standard Missile 3 (SM-3) Block IA guided missile. The in-orbit Space Tracking and Surveillance System-Demonstrators (STSS-D) detected and tracked the target, and forwarded track data to USS Lake Erie. The ship, equipped with the second-generation Aegis BMD weapon system, used Launch on Remote doctrine to engage the target. This event, designated Flight Test Standard Missile 20 (FTM-20), was a demonstration of the ability of space-based assets to provide mid-course fire control quality data to an Aegis BMD ship, extending the battlespace, providing the ability for longer range intercepts and defense of larger areas.
FTO-1	Sep 10, 2013	Success	FTO-01 was conducted in the vicinity of the U.S. Army Kwajalein Atoll Ronald Reagan Ballistic Missile Defense Test Site and surrounding areas in the western Pacific. The test stressed the ability of the Aegis Ballistic Missile Defense (BMD) and Terminal High Altitude Area Defense (THAAD) weapon systems to function in a layered defense architecture and defeat a raid of two near-simultaneous ballistic missile targets. USS Decatur with its Aegis Weapon System detected and tracked the first target with its onboard AN/SPY-1 radar. The Aegis BMD weapon system developed a fire control solution, launched a Standard Missile 3 (SM-3) Block IA missile, and successfully intercepted the target. In a demonstration of BMDS layered defense capabilities, a second AN/TPY-2 radar in Terminal Mode, located with the THAAD weapon system, acquired and tracked the target missiles. THAAD developed a fire control solution, launched a THAAD interceptor missile, and successfully intercepted the second medium-range ballistic missile target. THAAD was operated by soldiers from the Alpha Battery, 2nd Air Defense Artillery Regiment. As a planned demonstration of THAAD's layered defense capabilities, a second THAAD interceptor was launched at the target destroyed by Aegis as a contingency in the event the SM-3 did not achieve an intercept.
FTM-21	Sep 18, 2013	Success	USS Lake Erie successfully conducted a flight test today of the Aegis Ballistic Missile Defense (BMD) system, resulting in the intercept of a complex separating short-range ballistic missile target over the Pacific Ocean by the Aegis BMD 4.0 Weapon System and a Standard Missile 3 (SM-3) Block IB guided missile. This was an operationally realistic test, in which the target's launch time and bearing are not known in advance, and the target complex was the most difficult target engaged to date.
FTM-22	Oct 3, 2013	Success	USS Lake Erie successfully conducted an operational flight test of the Aegis Ballistic Missile Defense (BMD) system, resulting in the intercept of a medium-range ballistic missile target over the Pacific Ocean by the Aegis BMD 4.0 Weapon System and a Standard Missile 3 (SM-3) Block IB guided missile. FTM-22 is the 28th successful intercept in 34 flight test attempts for the Aegis BMD program since flight testing began in 2002. Across all Ballistic Missile Defense System programs, this is the 64th successful hit-to-kill intercept in 80 flight test attempts since 2001.
FTM-31 E1a	Mar 30, 2023	Success	The USS Daniel Inouye (DDG 118) successfully executed Test FTM-31 E1a. The test highlights adjustments made after FTM-31 E1 (May 2021) which did not meet all its objectives; this test validates that the upgraded Standard Missile 6 (SM-6) Dual II SWUP capability is now ready for use by the warfighter.
Stellar Daggers	Mar 26, 2009	Success	USS Benfold simultaneously engaged an SRBM in terminal phase and a cruise missile using SM-2s.
JFTM-1	Dec 18, 2007	Success	The JFTM-1 test event verified the new engagement capability of the Aegis BMD configuration of the recently upgraded Japanese destroyer, JS Kongō. At approximately 12:05 pm (HST), 7:05 am Tokyo time on December 18, 2007, a ballistic missile target was launched from the Pacific Missile Range Facility, Barking Sands, Kauaʻi, Hawaii. JS Kongō crew members detected and tracked the target. The Aegis Weapon System then developed a fire control solution and at approximately 12:08 pm (HST), 7:08 am Tokyo time, a Standard Missile 3 (SM-3) Block IA was launched. Approximately three minutes later, the SM-3 successfully intercepted the target approximately 100 miles above the Pacific Ocean.
JFTM-2	Nov 19, 2008	Failure	JFTM-2 was a test of the newest engagement capability of the Aegis Ballistic Missile Defense configuration of the recently upgraded Japanese destroyer, JS Chōkai. At approximately 4:21 pm (HST), 11:21 am (Tokyo time) a ballistic missile target was launched from the Pacific Missile Range Facility, Barking Sands, Kauaʻi, Hawaii. JS Chōkai crew members detected and tracked the target using an advanced on-board radar. The Aegis Weapon System then developed a fire control solution, and at approximately 4:24 pm (HST), 11:24 am (Tokyo time) on Nov 20, a single Standard Missile 3 (SM-3) Block IA was launched. Approximately two minutes later, the SM-3 failed to intercept the target. The cause of the failure was an SM-3 Block IA interceptor divert and attitude control malfunction.
JFTM-3	Nov 19, 2008	Success	The JFTM-3 test event verified the newest engagement capability of the Japan Aegis BMD configuration of the recently upgraded Japanese destroyer, JS Myōkō. At approximately 6:00pm (HST), 1:00 pm Tokyo time on October 28, a separating, medium-range ballistic missile target was launched from the Pacific Missile Range Facility, Barking Sands, Kauaʻi, Hawaii. JS Myōkō crew members detected and tracked the target. The Aegis Weapon System then developed a fire control solution and, at approximately 6:04pm (HST), 1:04 pm Tokyo time a Standard Missile 3 (SM-3) Block IA interceptor missile was launched. Approximately three minutes later, the SM-3 successfully intercepted the target approximately 100 miles above the Pacific Ocean.
JFTM-4	Oct 28, 2010	Success	The JFTM-4 test event verified the newest engagement capability of the Japan Aegis BMD configuration of the recently upgraded Japanese destroyer, JS Krishima. At approximately 5:06 p.m. (HST), 12:06 p.m. Tokyo time on October 29, 2010, a separating 1,000 km class ballistic missile target was launched from the Pacific Missile Range Facility at Barking Sands, Kauaʻi, Hawaii. JS Kirishima crew members detected and tracked the target. The Aegis Weapon System then developed a fire control solution and launched a Standard Missile 3 (SM-3) Block IA missile. Approximately three minutes later, the SM-3 successfully intercepted the target approximately 100 miles above the Pacific Ocean.
FTI-01	Oct 25, 2012	Failure	The live-fire demonstration, conducted at U.S. Army Kwajalein Atoll/Reagan Test Site, Hickam AFB, and surrounding areas in the western Pacific, stressed the performance of the Aegis Ballistic Missile Defense (BMD), THAAD, and PATRIOT (PAC-3) weapon systems. USS Fitzgerald successfully engaged a low flying cruise missile over water. The Aegis system also tracked and launched an SM-3 Block 1A interceptor against a Short-Range Ballistic Missile. However, despite indication of a nominal flight of the SM-3 Block 1A interceptor, there was no indication of an intercept of the SRBM. The failure was attributed to an Inertial Measurement Unit failure.
Pacific BlitZ	Nov 1, 2008	Partial	Pacific Blitz was the first U.S. Navy proficiency firing to employ the SM-3 missile against a ballistic missile target. During the Fleet Exercise "Pacific Blitz", two Pearl Harbor-based Aegis BMD destroyers, USS Paul Hamilton and USS Hopper fired SM-3 missiles at separate targets. Upon detecting and tracking the target, USS Paul Hamilton launched an SM-3 missile resulting in a direct hit. USS Hopper successfully detected, monitored and fired at the second target, but the interceptor missed. The cause of the failure was attributed to an infrared seeker failure.
Pacific Phoenix	May 6, 2006	Success	USS Lake Erie successfully intercepted a Unitary short-range target.
FTM-25	Nov 6, 2014	Success	USS John Paul Jones successfully conducted a flight test of the Aegis Ballistic Missile Defense (BMD) system, resulting in three successful near-simultaneous target engagements over the Pacific Ocean. One short-range ballistic missile target was intercepted by a Standard Missile 3 (SM-3) Block IB guided missile, while two low-flying cruise missile targets were engaged by Standard Missile 2 (SM-2) Block IIIA guided missiles near-simultaneously.
MMW event 1	July 28, 2015	Success	A short-range ballistic missile (SRBM) target was launched from PMRF in a northwesterly trajectory. USS John Paul Jones, positioned west of Hawaii, detected, tracked, and launched a SM-6 Dual I missile, resulting in a successful target intercept in the terminal stage.
MMW event 2	July 29, 2015	Success	A short-range ballistic missile (SRBM) target was launched from PMRF in a northwesterly trajectory. USS John Paul Jones, positioned west of Hawaii, detected, tracked, and launched a SM-2 block 4 missile, resulting in a successful target intercept.
MTMD	October 20, 2015	Success	A Terrier-Orion short-range ballistic missile (SRBM) target was launched from the UK's Hebrides Range, northwest of Scotland. With multinational vessels in the North Atlantic participating in Maritime Theater Missile Defense, USS Ross launched a SM-3 Block IA missile, resulting in a successful target intercept.
FTO-02 event 2a	October 31, 2015	Failure	The test stressed the ability of Aegis Ballistic Missile Defense (BMD) and Terminal High Altitude Area Defense (THAAD) weapon systems to negate two ballistic missile threats while Aegis BMD simultaneously conducted an anti-air warfare operation. A Short Range Air Launch Target (SRALT) was launched by a U.S. Air Force C-17. THAAD successfully intercepted the SRALT target. While THAAD was engaging the SRALT, an extended Medium Range Ballistic Missile (eMRBM) was air-launched by another Air Force C-17. The eMRBM target was detected and tracked by multiple BMDS assets including the AN/TPY-2 in forward-based mode, and USS John Paul Jones with its AN/SPY-1 radar. Shortly after eMRBM launch, a BQM-74E air-breathing target was also launched and tracked by USS John Paul Jones. Both Aegis BMD and THAAD launched interceptors to engage the eMRBM. USS John Paul Jones successfully launched a Standard Missile-3 (SM-3) Block IB Threat Upgrade guided missile, but an anomaly early in its flight prevented a midcourse intercept. However, the THAAD interceptor, in its terminal defense role, acquired and successfully intercepted the target. Concurrently, Aegis BMD successfully engaged the BQM-74E air-breathing target with a Standard Missile-2 Block IIIA guided missile. A failure review is currently underway to investigate the SM-3 anomaly.
FTO-02 event 1a	December 9, 2015	Success	During the test, a target representing a medium-range ballistic missile was air-launched from a U.S. Air Force C-17 aircraft over the broad ocean area southwest of Hawaii. The Aegis Ashore Weapon System then launched the SM-3 Block IB Threat Upgrade guided missile from its Vertical Launch System. The SM-3's kinetic warhead acquired the target reentry vehicle, diverted into its path, and destroyed the target using the kinetic force of a direct impact.
FTM-27	December 14, 2016	Success	USS John Paul Jones, an Aegis baseline 9.C1 equipped destroyer, successfully fired a salvo of two SM-6 Dual I missiles against a complex medium-range ballistic missile target, demonstrating the Sea Based Terminal endo-atmospheric defensive capability.
SFTM-01	February 3, 2017	Success	The test from USS John Paul Jones was the first launch of an SM-3 Block IIA missile from an Aegis Ballistic Missile Defense (BMD) ship, and the first intercept engagement using the Aegis Baseline 9.C2 (BMD 5.1) weapon system. SFTM-01 was the third flight test of the SM-3 Block IIA missile, but the first intercept attempt.
SFTM-02	June 21, 2017	Failure	A medium-range ballistic target missile was launched from the Pacific Missile Range Facility at Kauaʻi, Hawaii. The USS John Paul Jones (DDG-53) detected and tracked the target missile with its onboard AN/SPY-1 radar using the Aegis Baseline 9.C2 weapon system. Upon acquiring and tracking the target, the ship launched an SM-3 Block IIA guided missile, but the missile did not intercept the target. The attempt was unsuccessful because a sailor on board the firing ship inadvertently designated the target as friendly, causing the Aegis Weapon System to break the engagement and initiate a message commanding the SM-3 Block IIA missile to destruct, destroying the missile in flight
FTM-27 E2	August 29, 2017	Success	The USS John Paul Jones (DDG-53) successfully conducted a complex missile defense flight test, resulting in the intercept of a medium-range ballistic missile (MRBM) target using Standard Missile-6 (SM-6) guided missiles during a test off the coast of Hawaii.
FS-17 E4	October 15, 2017	Success	The guided-missile destroyer USS Donald Cook (DDG-75) successfully detected, tracked and intercepted a medium-range ballistic missile target with a Standard Missile-3 Block IB guided missile.
FTM-29	January 31, 2018	Failure	The Missile Defense Agency and U.S. Navy sailors manning the Aegis Ashore Missile Defense Test Complex (AAMDTC) conducted a live-fire missile flight test Jan. 31 using a Standard-Missile (SM)-3 Block IIA missile launched from the Pacific Missile Range Facility, Kauaʻi, Hawaii. This was a developmental and operational test of a new capability and utilized a missile variant not yet in production. The primary objective of the test, to intercept an air-launched intermediate-range ballistic missile target with an SM-3 Block IIA missile, was not achieved.
JFTM-5 Event 2	September 11, 2018	Success	The test event verified the newest BMD engagement capability of the Japan (J6) Aegis BMD configuration of the recently upgraded Japan destroyer, JS ATAGO (DDG-177). At approximately 10:37pm HST on September 11, 2018, a simple separating, ballistic missile target was launched from the Pacific Missile Range Facility at Barking Sands, Kauaʻi, Hawaii. JS ATAGO crew members detected and tracked the target. The Aegis Weapon System then developed a fire control solution and a Standard Missile -3 Block IB Threat Upgrade (SM-3 Blk IB TU) missile was launched. The SM-3 successfully intercepted the target above the Pacific Ocean.
FTM-45	October 26, 2018	Success	The USS John Finn (DDG-113) successfully conducted an intercept of a medium-range ballistic missile target with a Standard Missile-3 (SM-3) Block IIA missile during a flight test off the west coast of Hawaii.
FTI-03	December 10, 2018	Success	The Aegis Ashore Missile Defense Test Complex (AAMDTC) at the Pacific Missile Range Facility (PMRF) at Kauaʻi, Hawaii, successfully conducted Flight Test Integrated-03 (FTI-03). This was an operational live fire test demonstrating the Aegis Weapon System Engage On Remote capability to track and intercept an Intermediate Range Ballistic Missile (IRBM) target with an Aegis Ashore-launched Standard Missile-3 (SM-3) Block IIA interceptor.
FTM-44	November 17, 2020	Success	At approximately 7:50 p.m. Hawaii Standard Time, (12:50 a.m., Nov. 17, Eastern Standard Time), the ICBM-representative target was launched from the Ronald Reagan Ballistic Missile Defense Test Site, located on Kwajalein Atoll in the Republic of the Marshall Islands, toward the broad ocean area northeast of Hawaii. In this developmental test, the USS John Finn (DDG-113) used engage-on-remote capabilities through the Command and Control Battle Management Communications (C2BMC) network as part of a defense of Hawaii scenario. After receiving tracking data from the C2BMC system, the destroyer launched a SM-3 Block IIA guided missile which destroyed the target.
FTM-48	October 25, 2023	Success	Codename: Vigilant Wyvern. USS Carl M. Levin successfully conducted an interception of two Terrier Oriole medium-range ballistic missile targets with two SM-3 Block IA missiles and of two BQM-117A subsonic anti-ship cruise missile drone targets with four SM-2 Block IIIA missiles. The targets were launched from Pacific Missile Range Facility in Hawaii.
FTX-23	February 8, 2024	Success	Codename: Stellar Sisyphus. The first part of the test was planned as a tracking event of a complex target with the primary objective of collecting data on the target scene from multiple sensors across different viewing angles. It involved USS McCampbell and USS Jack H. Lucas, together with the Aegis Ashore Missile Defense Test Complex and the Advanced Radar Development Evaluation Laboratory, tracking a Medium Range Ballistic Missile with countermeasures released by a Boeing C-17 Globemaster III plane flying over the Pacific Missile Range Facility in Hawaii. The second part of the test consisted in the successful interception of the target with a SM-3 Block IIA missile launched by USS McCampbell.
FTM-32	March 28, 2024	Success	Codename: Stellar Laelaps. The test demonstrated the capability to detect, track, engage, and intercept an MRBM target in the terminal phase of flight. A Medium Range Ballistic Missile launched from the Pacific Missile Range Facility in Hawaii was intercepted through two SM-6 Dual II missiles launched by USS Preble. Support was provided also by USS Jack H. Lucas, as well as by the Australian Defence Force through HMAS Stuart and a Boeing E-7 Wedgetail aircraft.
FEM-02	December 10, 2024	Success	The test involved the first end-to-end tracking use of the new AN/TPY-6 radar, and consisting in a Medium Range Ballistic Missile air-launched by a Boeing C-17 Globemaster III and successfully intercepted by a SM-3 Block-IIA missile that took off from a newly installed Vertical Launching System in the Andersen Air Force Base.
FTX-40	March 24, 2025	Success	Codename: Stellar Banshee. The test was conducted off the coast of the Pacific Missile Range Facility. A Medium Range Ballistic Missile equipped with a Hypersonic Target Vehicle (HTV-1) was air-launched by a Boeing C-17 Globemaster III, while USS Pinckney conducted a detection and interception test using a simulated SM-6 missile. The test served as a demonstration of the latest Sea Based Terminal (SBT) Increment 3 update to the Aegis software baseline.
FTX-26a	June 24, 2025	Success	The test served as a demonstration of the Long Range Discrimination Radar (LRDR) at Clear Space Force Station, Alaska. The LDRD system and the Upgraded Early Warning Radar successfully acquired, tracked and reported a live Intercontinental Ballistic Missile target air-launched by a Boeing C-17 Globemaster III over the Pacific Ocean that flew for over 2,000 km off the coast of Alaska.

=== Gallery ===
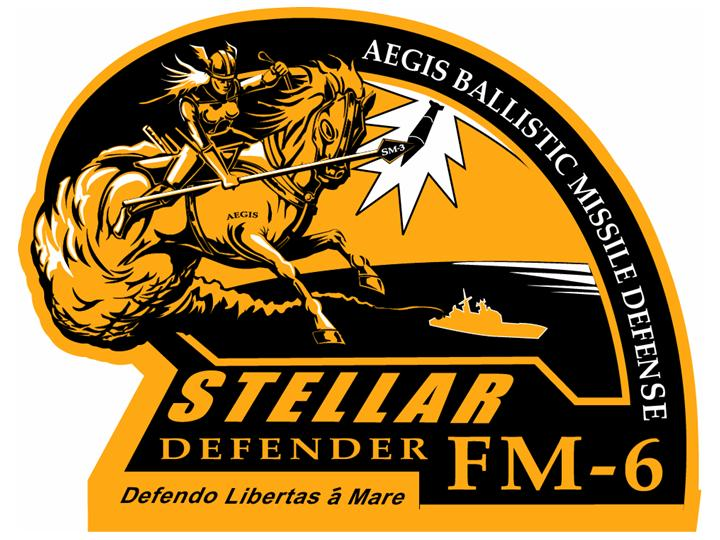
FM-6 Mission Logo

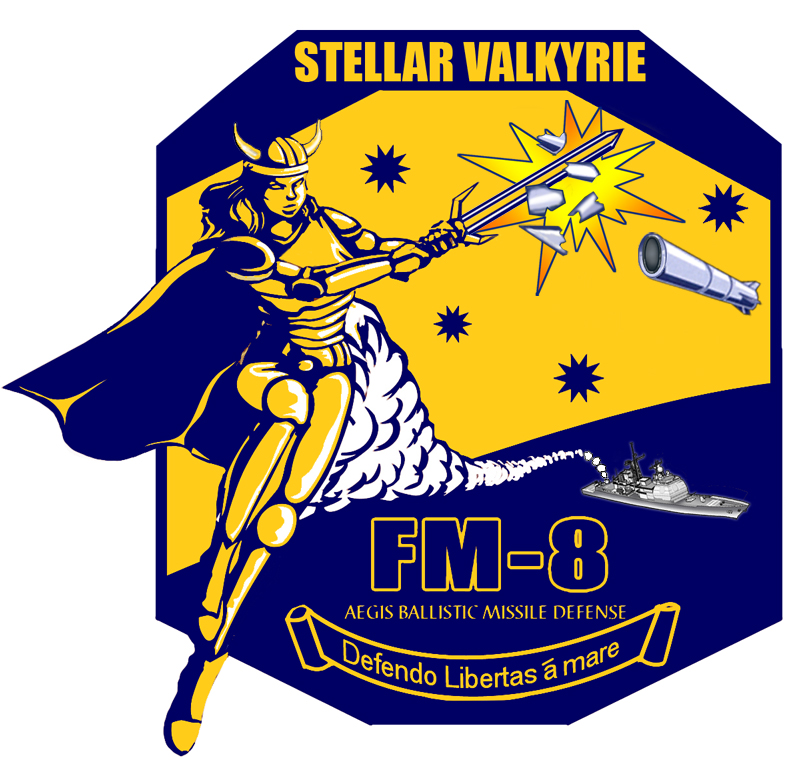
FM-8 Mission Logo

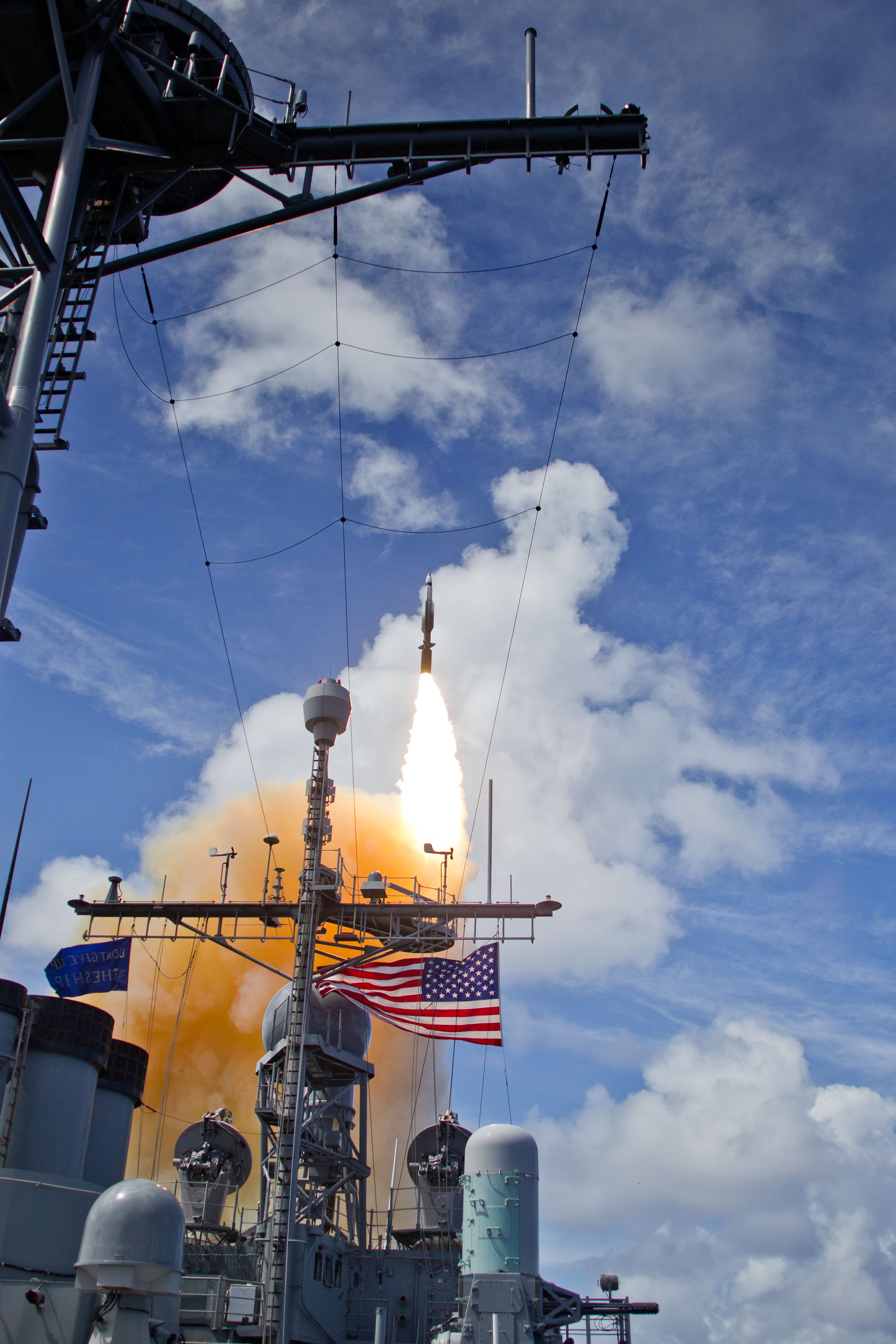
SM-3 interceptor launch during FTM-21

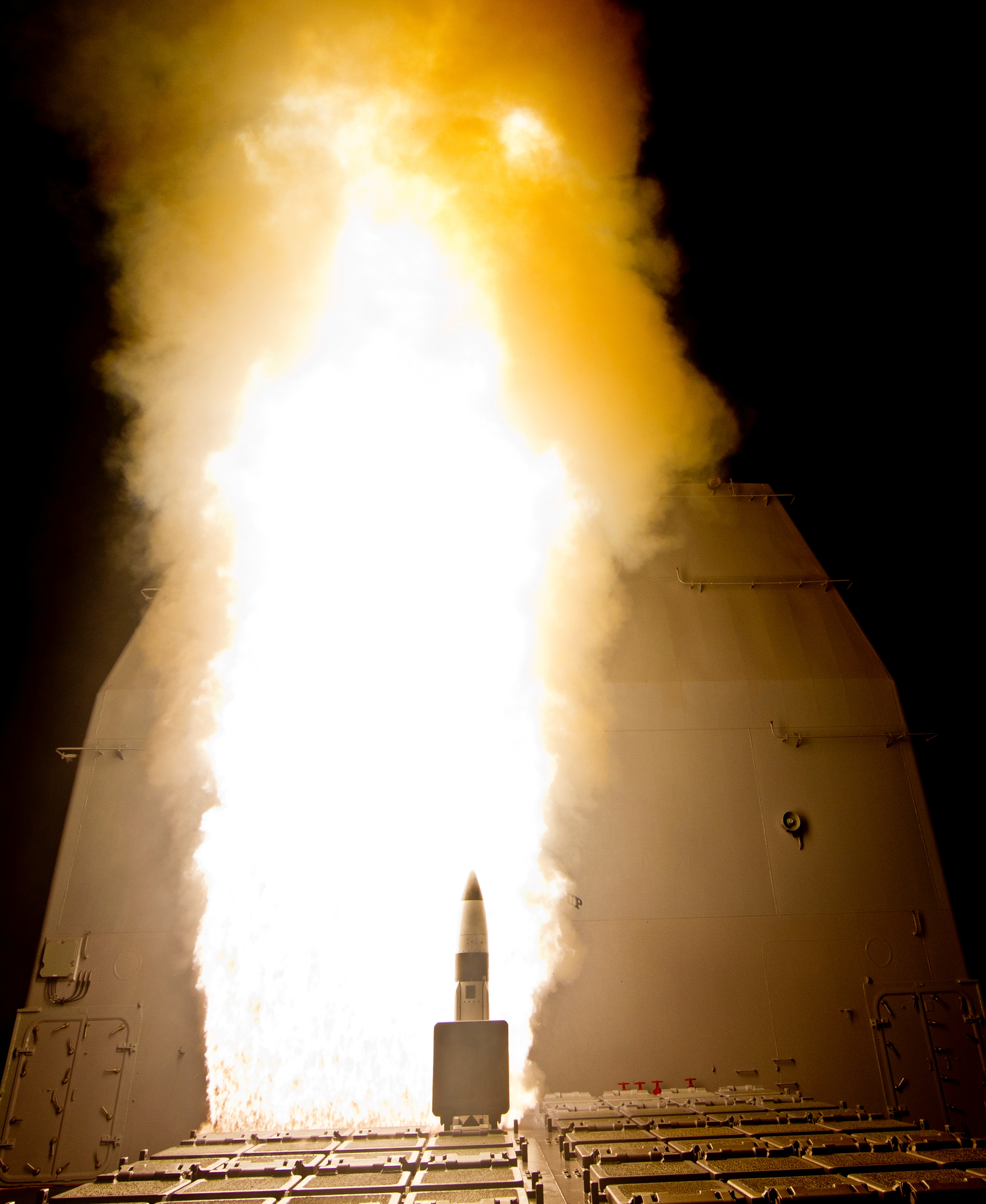
Launch of SM-3 interceptor during FTM-18

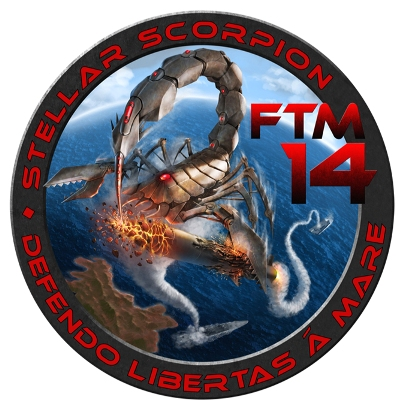
FTM-14 Mission Logo

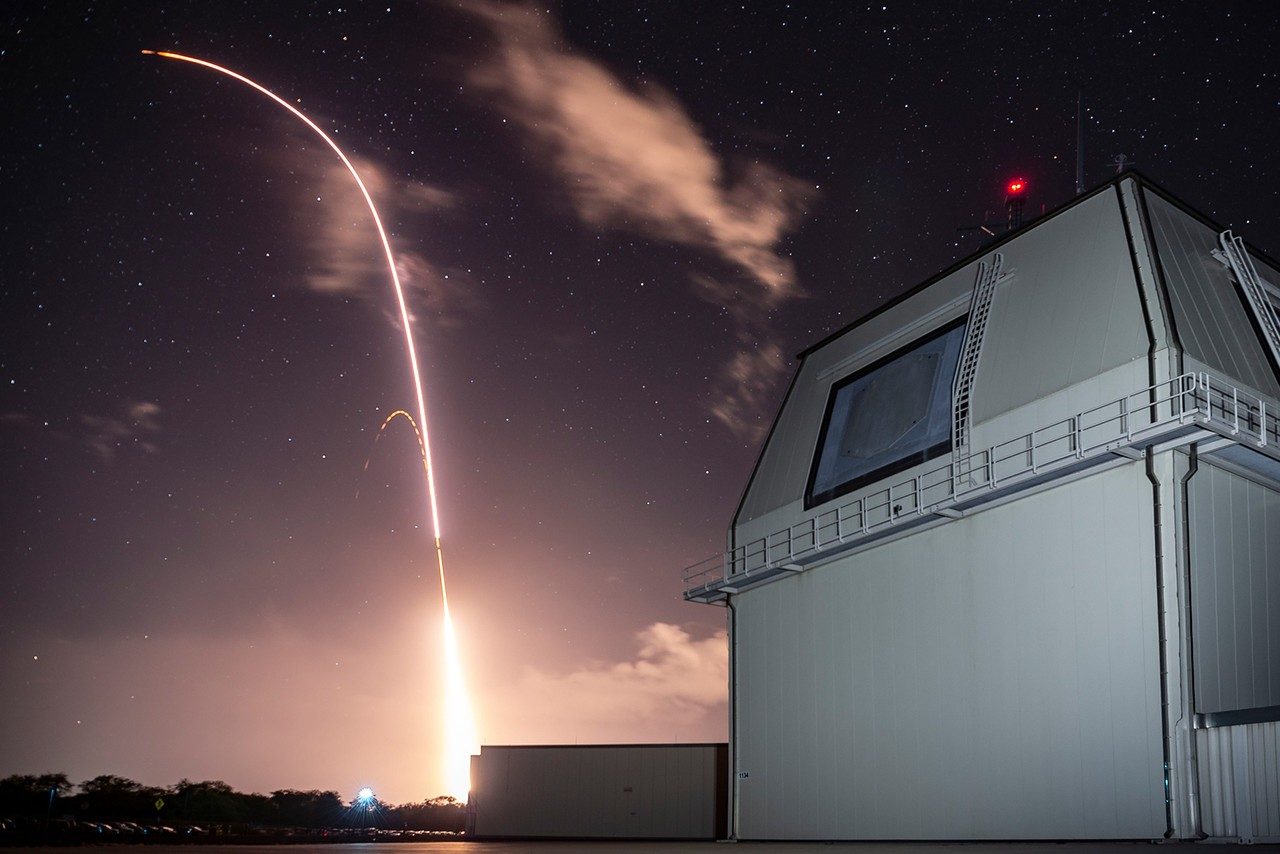
SM-3 Block IIA launch from the Aegis Ashore in Hawaii

== See also ==
- Aegis Weapon System
- Anti-ballistic missile
- Arrow missile
- Atago-class destroyer
- Ballistic Missile Defense Organization
- Indian Ballistic Missile Defence Programme
- Kinetic Energy Interceptor
- MIM-104 Patriot missile
- National Missile Defense
- NATO missile defence system
- Pacific Missile Range Facility
- RIM-161 Standard Missile 3
- Strategic Defense Initiative
- Terminal High Altitude Area Defense (THAAD)
- Ticonderoga class cruiser
- Vertical Launching System
- YAL-1 Airborne Laser
- American naval ballistic systems
