= United States missile defense complex in Poland =

Planned American missile defense base

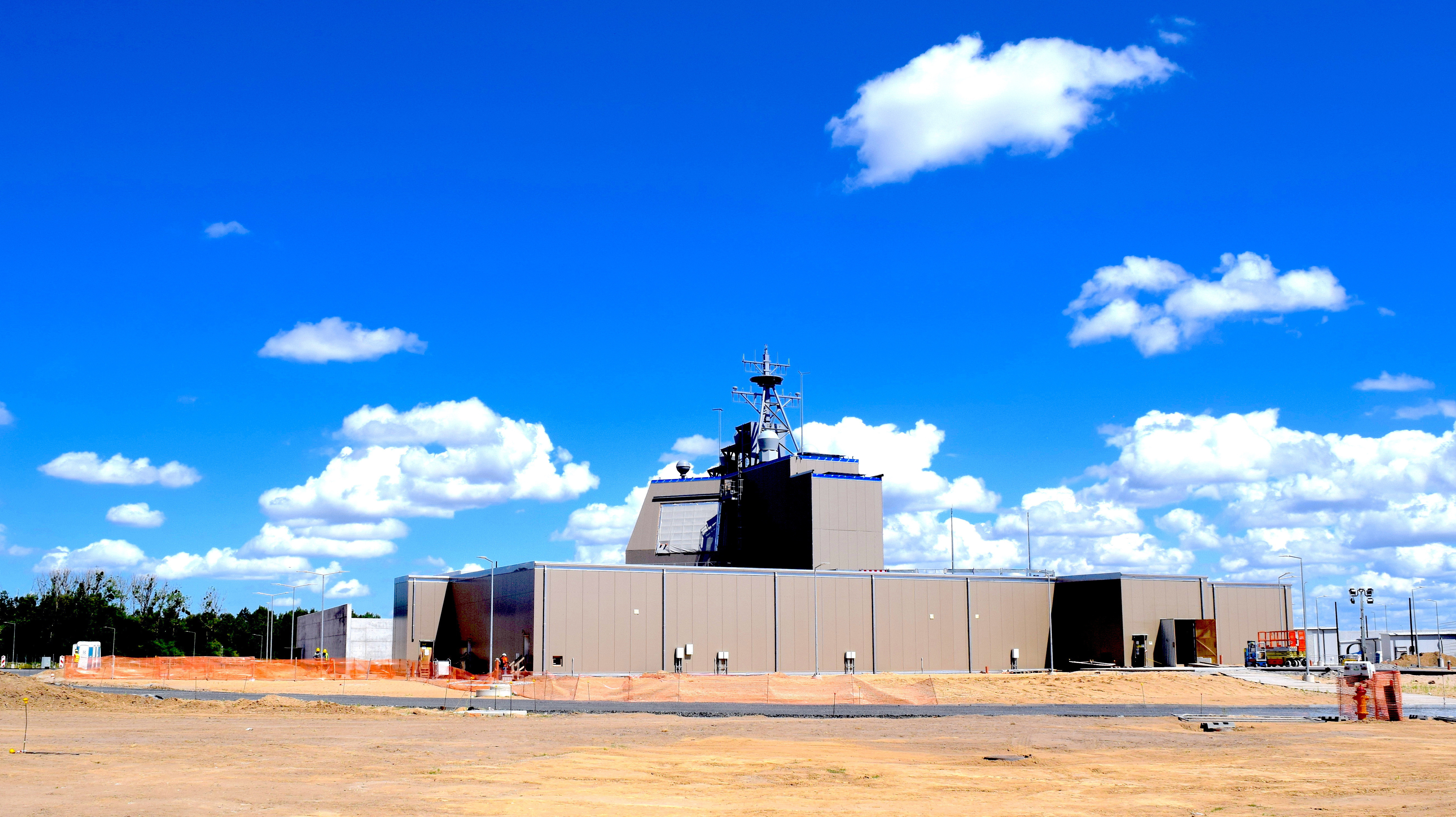
Naval Support Facility in Redzikowo, Poland, August 2019

The United States missile defense complex in Poland, replaced a planned site in Redzikowo, Poland with a phased plan—the Aegis Ballistic Missile Defense System, including SM-3 Block IIA interceptors to be positioned in Poland from 2018; Naval Support Facility-Redzikowo was to transition from Missile Defense Agency control to the US Navy on Friday, 15 December 2023, according to the Prime Minister of Poland, Donald Tusk, and Sixth Fleet. The official transfer to NATO was announced on 10 July 2024, at the same time, the missile defense site was declared operational. The base was officially opened on 13 November 2024; eight days later, Russia warned that the base "is a priority target for potential neutralization."

== Development ==
The European Interceptor Site (EIS), was a planned but never built American missile defense base. It was intended to contain 10 silo-based interceptors: two-stage versions of the existing three-stage Ground-Based Interceptors with Exoatmospheric Kill Vehicles that had a closing speed of about 7 km/s.

The EIS was to be located near Redzikowo, Poland, forming a Ground-Based Midcourse Defense system in conjunction with a U.S. narrow-beam midcourse tracking and discrimination radar system located in Brdy, Czech Republic. The EIS was cancelled in 2009. According to the United States government, the missile defense system was intended to protect against future missiles from Iran. Russia strongly opposed the system. As an alternative, Russia proposed sharing the Qabala Radar in Azerbaijan, which Russia leases, but this was not seen as an acceptable substitute by the US.

While the Polish and Czech governments were in favor of the project, the missile shield received opposition from some groups within Poland and the Czech Republic. Opposition activity included protests and a relay hunger strike by two Czech activists in May 2008, which lasted for 300 days.

On September 17, 2009, the Obama administration announced that plans for the EIS project had been scrapped.

In October 2009—during a trip by Vice President Joe Biden to Warsaw—a new, smaller interceptor project to go forward on roughly the same schedule as the Bush administration plan, was proposed; and it was welcomed by Prime Minister Donald Tusk. Naval Support Facility-Redzikowo was to be declared operational on Friday, 15 December 2023, according to the prime minister of Poland, Donald Tusk. The base was officially opened on 13 November 2024.

== History ==
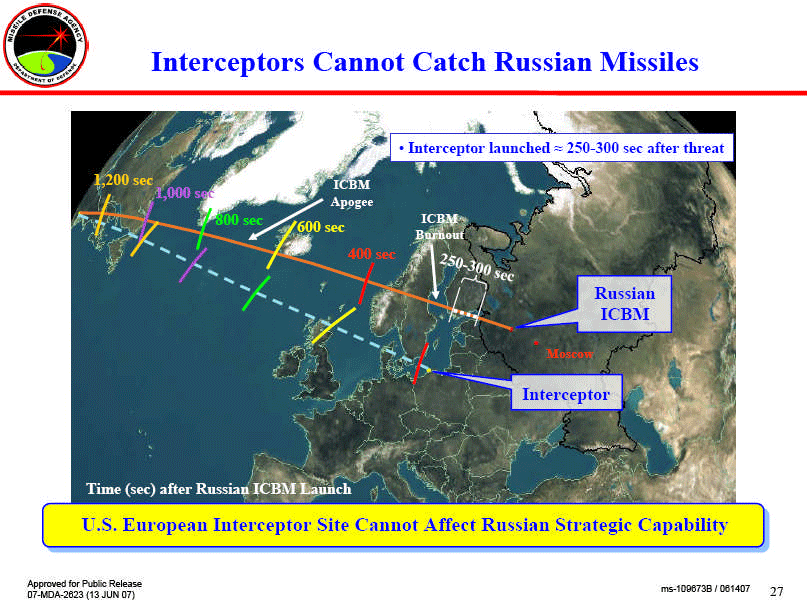
A Missile Defense Agency diagram depicting projected flight paths of interceptors compared to Russian ICBMs

Since 2002, the U.S. had been in talks with Poland and other European countries over the possibility of setting up a European base to intercept long-range missiles. According to U.S. officials, a site similar to the American base in Alaska would help protect the US and Europe from missiles fired from the Middle East or North Africa. The Ustka-Wicko base of the Polish Army (at 54.554°N 16.620°E) was initially mentioned as a possible site of US missile interceptors. Poland's prime minister Kazimierz Marcinkiewicz said in November 2005 he wanted to open up the public debate on whether Poland should host such a base.

In February 2007, the United States started formal negotiations with Poland and the Czech Republic concerning construction of missile shield installations in those countries for a Ground-Based Midcourse Defense System. In April 2007 the Washington Post reported that 57% of Poles opposed the plan.

Russia threatened to place short-range nuclear missiles on its borders with NATO, if the United States went ahead with plans to deploy 10 interceptor missiles in Poland and a radar in the Czech Republic. In April 2007, then-President Putin warned of a new Cold War if the Americans deployed the shield in Central Europe. Putin said that Russia was prepared to abandon its obligations under the Nuclear Forces Treaty of 1987 with the United States.

In July 2008, Poland did not agree on the conditions set forth by the United States regarding the installation of anti-ballistic missiles on its territory.

In July 2008, the Russian Foreign Ministry stated that if the missile defense system was approved, "we will be forced to react not with diplomatic, but with military-technical methods."

On August 14, 2008, shortly after the 2008 South Ossetia war, the United States and Poland announced a deal to implement the missile defense system on Polish territory, with a tracking system placed in the Czech Republic. The Russians responded by saying such action "cannot go unpunished." Dmitry Rogozin, Russia's NATO envoy, said, "The fact that this was signed in a period of a very difficult crisis in the relations between Russia and the United States over the situation in Georgia shows that, of course, the missile defense system will be deployed not against Iran but against the strategic potential of Russia."

A high-ranking Russian military officer warned Poland that it was exposing itself to attack by accepting a U.S. missile interceptor base on its soil. The deputy chief of staff of Russia's armed forces Gen. Anatoly Nogovitsyn warned that, "by deploying (the system), it is exposing itself to a strike—100 percent".

On August 20, 2008, the "Agreement Between the Government of the United States of America and the Government of the Republic of Poland Concerning the Deployment of Ground-Based Ballistic Missile Defense Interceptors in the Territory of the Republic of Poland" was signed in Warsaw by US Secretary of State Condoleezza Rice and Poland’s foreign minister Radoslaw Sikorski.

On November 5, 2008, in his first State of the Nation speech, Russian president Dmitry Medvedev stated, "From what we have seen in recent years—the creation of a missile defense system, the encirclement of Russia with military bases, the relentless expansion of NATO—we have gotten the clear impression that they are testing our strength." Russia would deploy short-range Iskander missiles to Russia's western enclave of Kaliningrad, sandwiched between Poland and Lithuania "to neutralize, if necessary, a missile defense system."

On November 8, an aide to U.S. president-elect Barack Obama denied a claim made by Polish president Lech Kaczyński's office, that a pledge had been made to go ahead with the EIS missile defense system during a phone conversation between the two men. "His [Obama's] position is as it was throughout the campaign, that he supports deploying a missile defence system when the technology is proved to be workable," the aide said, but "no commitment" has been made.

On November 14, French president Nicolas Sarkozy stated that plans for a U.S. missile shield in Central Europe were misguided, and wouldn't make the continent a safer place. "Deployment of a missile defense system would bring nothing to security ... it would complicate things, and would make them move backward," he said at a summit. He also warned Russian president Medvedev against upping tensions by deploying missiles in Kaliningrad in response to the planned U.S. missile defense system.

On April 5, 2009, President Obama, during a speech in Prague, declared: "As long as the threat from Iran persists, we will go forward with a missile defense system that is cost-effective and proven." President Obama continued to express conditional support for the program and sought to isolate it from U.S.-Russian nuclear arms control talks.

On September 17, 2009, The White House issued a statement saying that the US "no longer planned to move forward" with the EIS project. According to President Obama, new intelligence had shown Iran was pursuing short-range and medium-range missile development, rather than long-range, necessitating a shift in strategy. The outlines of a reformulated, scaled-down project began to emerge in October, 2009.

After the project cancellation, Vice President Joe Biden visited Poland in 2009 to "mend relations" by announcing the SM-3 deployment plan (see below for details of the new plan). Polish sources complained that the new plan no longer gave Poland an exclusive role (because an SM-3 site was also planned for Romania).

In 2010 leaked diplomatic cables showed that Polish diplomats felt more threatened by Russia than by Iran. The (leaked) responses from the Pentagon show that Alexander Vershbow sought to assure that the missile shield, including the SM-3 alternative, was adaptable to "hypothetical" threats.

On March 26, 2012, there occurred a microphone gaffe between President Obama and President Medvedev. Obama said that he would have "more flexibility" to deal with controversial issues such as missile defense. He was heard telling Medvedev, "On all these issues, but particularly missile defense, this, this can be solved but it's important for him to give me space." Medvedev told the president in English, "Yeah, I understand. I understand your message about space. Space for you…" and President Obama continued his statement, "This is my last election. After my election I have more flexibility." Medvedev responded saying, again in English, "I understand. I will transmit this information to Vladimir."

In March 2013, Polish Deputy Minister of Defense Robert Kupiecki announced that Poland intended to build its own missile defense within NATO, complementing the US deployment. Poland's tentative budget for the next decade is "$10 billion for the modernization of air defense, where half of this sum is dedicated to lower-tier missile defense."

== International reactions to discontinuation of the project ==
=== Polish response ===
The Polish government responded nervously to the 2009 discontinuation. Some politicians voiced concern that the country would lose its special status in Washington, and that the move by Obama was to appease Moscow. Jarosław Gowin, a member of Poland's governing Civic Platform party, said Obama's decision had been made independently of Polish sensitivities. Former Polish president Lech Wałęsa said he was deeply disappointed by the new US administration's plans. He stated: "The Americans have always only taken care of their own interests and they have used everyone else."

In a September 2009, poll, 56 percent of Poles supported Obama's decision and only 30 percent were against it. Jarosław Kaczyński, the leader of the main Polish opposition party, claimed that the decision of abandoning the shield being announced on September 17 was not an accident. (The date is of great symbolic value to Poland, as on September 17, 1939, Poland was invaded by the Soviet Union). Polish newspapers showed mixed responses to the discontinuation, with some seeing it as a positive action, and some seeing it having very negative connotations.

However, Slawomir Nowak, a senior adviser to Polish prime minister Tusk, responded positively to the proposed short- and medium-range missile systems replacing the long-range systems: "If this system becomes reality in the shape Washington is now suggesting, it would actually be better for us than the original missile shield programme," he stated. "We were never really threatened by a long-range missile attack from Iran," he told TVP Info.

==== Polish non-governmental response ====
The Polish daily newspaper Rzeczpospolita conducted a survey which showed that 48 percent of Poles believed the decision was good for Poland, while 31 percent had the opposite view. In contrast, the Polish tabloid newspaper Fakt, ran a front-page headline "Ale byliśmy naiwni ZDRADA! USA sprzedały nas Rosji i wbiły nam nóż w plecy" which translates to "We were so naive. Betrayal! The U.S. sold us to Russia and stabbed us in the back". This was also reported by other news organizations.

According to a poll by SMG/KRC released by TVP 50 per cent of respondents rejected the deployment of the shield on Polish soil, while 36 per cent supported it.

The Associated Press reported, "The move has raised fears in the two nations they are being marginalized by Washington even as a resurgent Russia leaves them longing for added American protection."

=== American response ===
Reactions in the US to Obama's decision were mixed. Some Republican critics saw the decision as a move to placate Moscow. Defeated presidential candidate John McCain called the decision "seriously misguided". Conversely, Democratic House Speaker Nancy Pelosi said the decision was "brilliant" and was clearly based on an accurate summary of the current threats. Obama rejected accusations that the decision was an appeasement of Moscow. He stated in an interview: "The Russians don't make determinations about what our defence posture is. If the by-product of it is that the Russians feel a little less paranoid... then that's a bonus."

=== Russian response ===
President Medvedev welcomed the EIS news as "positive". "We value the US president’s responsible approach towards implementing our agreements," he stated in an address shown on national television. Prime Minister Putin said it was a "correct and brave" move. The main reason for President Barack Obama's decision was "Russia's uncompromising position on the issue," according to Russian foreign policy expert Mikhail Margelov, chairman of the Foreign Affairs Committee Federation Council of Russia.

=== Western European response ===
Leaders in the western European Union reacted positively. German chancellor Angela Merkel welcomed the move, calling it "a very hopeful signal" for relations with Russia. French President Nicolas Sarkozy said, "an excellent decision from every point of view and I hope that our Russian friends will attach importance to this decision," while British prime minister Gordon Brown gave his full backing, stating that he strongly supported the decision taken by Obama.

=== Czech response ===
Czech President Václav Klaus said the step by the U.S. government was "no big surprise for anybody who had been following the cues in the past days and months," but that he was "100 percent convinced" that the step was not an expression of a cooling in relations between the United States and the Czech Republic. However, Mirek Topolanek, who was prime minister when Prague agreed to co-host the shield, said the U.S. decision to drop the plans "is not good news for the Czech state, for Czech freedom and independence."

== Reformulated Obama administration project ==
The reformulated project announced most prominently by Vice President Biden in October, 2009, would entail smaller, mobile SM-3 interceptors, to be placed by 2018. The whole of the Obama plan "envisions stationing existing SM-3 interceptors as part of the Aegis Ballistic Missile Defense on Aegis-equipped ships in the Mediterranean Sea and elsewhere by 2011, and on land in Central Europe by 2015, as part of a European Phased Adaptive Approach (EPAA). A more advanced system would be deployed by 2018, including to Poland as EPAA phase 3, and a more-advanced generation (EPAA phase 4), theoretically capable of shooting down intercontinental missiles, by 2020."

Phase 4 was cancelled in March 2013, triggering some speculation that it was a concession promised by Obama to President Medvedev before the 2012 United States presidential election. The allegations of Russian influence over this decision were denied by the Pentagon.

The Aegis land base will still be located near Redzikowo. Aegis Ashore for Poland was scheduled to be operational by year-end 2022. However, in August 2022, Vice Admiral Jon A. Hill, director for the Missile Defense Agency, announced that the site is nearing completion and will be ready in 2023. Prior to this announcement, Hill said that US Navy sailors are already living in the facilities. NSF Redzikowo was to be declared operational on Friday, 15 December 2023, according to the prime minister of Poland, Donald Tusk.

== See also ==
- National missile defense
- Anti-ballistic missile
- Sentinel program
- Deveselu Military Base
