= Deveselu =

- Commune
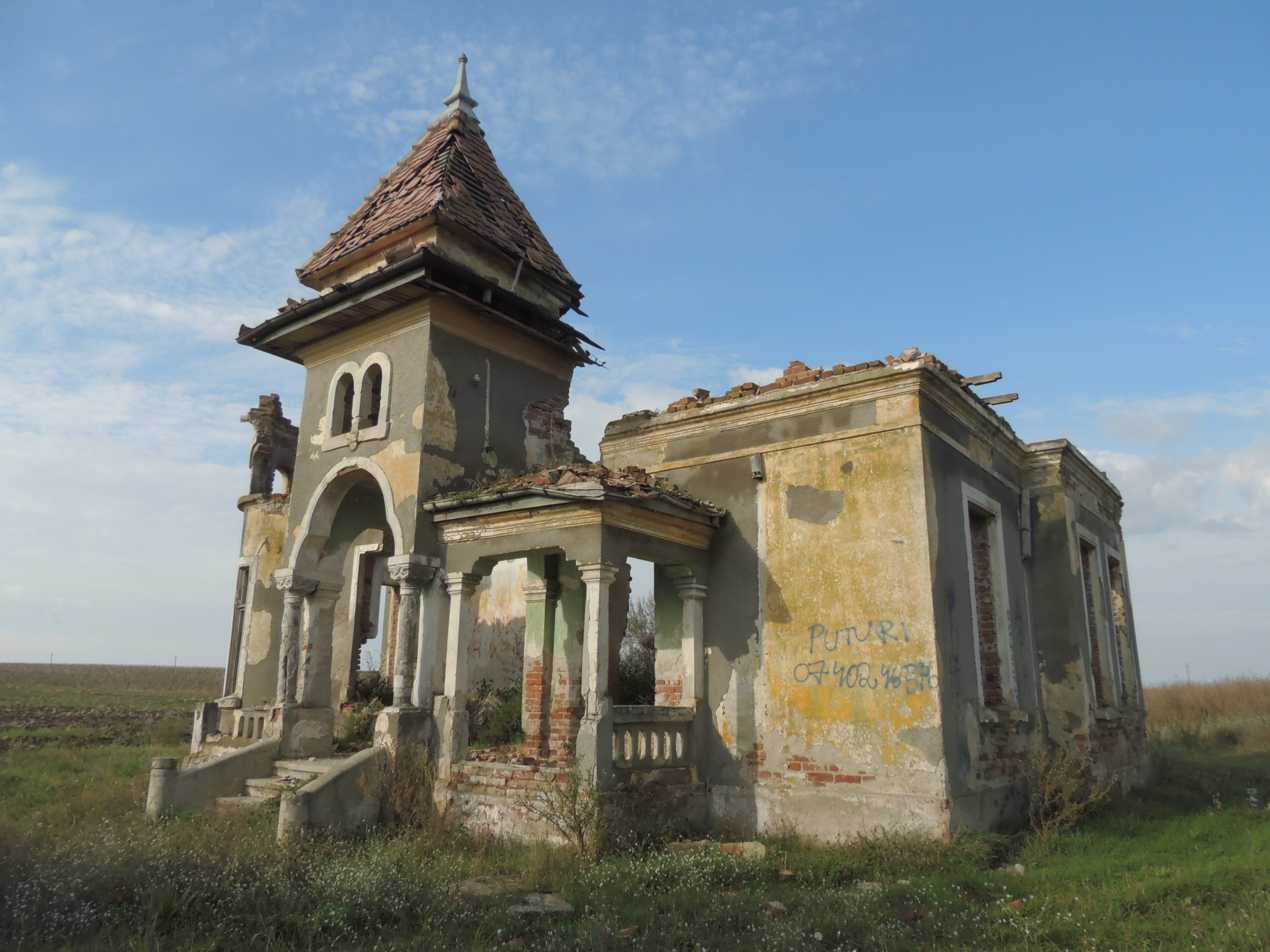
- Abandoned house in Deveselu

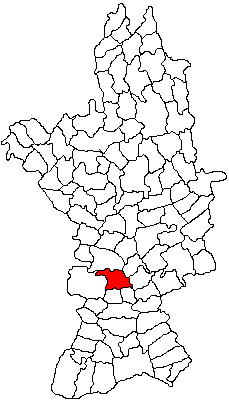
- Location in Olt County

- Location in Romania
- Coordinates: 44°03′N 24°23′E
- Country: Romania
- County: Olt

Government
  - Mayor (2021–2024): Nicolae Dobre (PSD)
- Area: 49.1 km^{2} (19.0 sq mi)
- Population (2021-12-01): 2,872
  - Density: 58.5/km^{2} (151/sq mi)
- Time zone: UTC+02:00 (EET)
  - Summer (DST): UTC+03:00 (EEST)
- Postal code: 237130
- Area code: 0249
- Vehicle reg.: OT
- Website: www.primariadeveselu.judetulolt.ro

Deveselu (Romanian pronunciation: [deveˈselu]) is a commune in Olt County, Oltenia, Romania. It is composed of two villages, Comanca and Deveselu.

== Geography ==
The commune is situated on the Wallachian Plain, about 14 km (8.7 mi) west of the river Olt. It is located in the south-central part of the county, 10 km (6.2 mi) from Caracal, and 52 km (32 mi) from the county seat, Slatina.

Deveselu is crossed by national road DN54, which starts in Caracal and goes south to Corabia, a port on the Danube. The Deveselu train station serves the CFR Line 910, which runs from Piatra-Olt to Caracal and Corabia.

== History ==
Deveselu is first mentioned in a document from 1537, signed by Radu Paisie.

In 2020, Mayor Ion Aliman died at age 56 due to COVID-19; the Associated Press described him as "popular", and residents re-elected him with 1,057 out of 1,600 votes in his favor after he had died.

On 27 June 2021, partial local elections were held to fill up the mayor's seat in Deveselu, and in 35 other localities. The winner of those elections, Nicolae Dobre from the Social Democratic Party, cousin of Ion Aliman earned 924 votes. The runner-up, Marius Aliman from the National Liberal Party, son of Ion Aliman, earned 812 votes.

== Air base ==
The construction of the Romanian Air Force military air base at Deveselu started in 1952, with assistance from the Soviet Union. Four squadrons with some 100 pilots flying MiG-15 and MiG-19 jets were based here. By the 1980s, the air base had become the most important one in Romania. During the 1990s, it was the only air base in the country from where night missions were conducted. The Deveselu air base was closed in 2003, forcing approximately 200 personnel into early retirement; about 15 still live in the commune in the "airmen neighborhood".

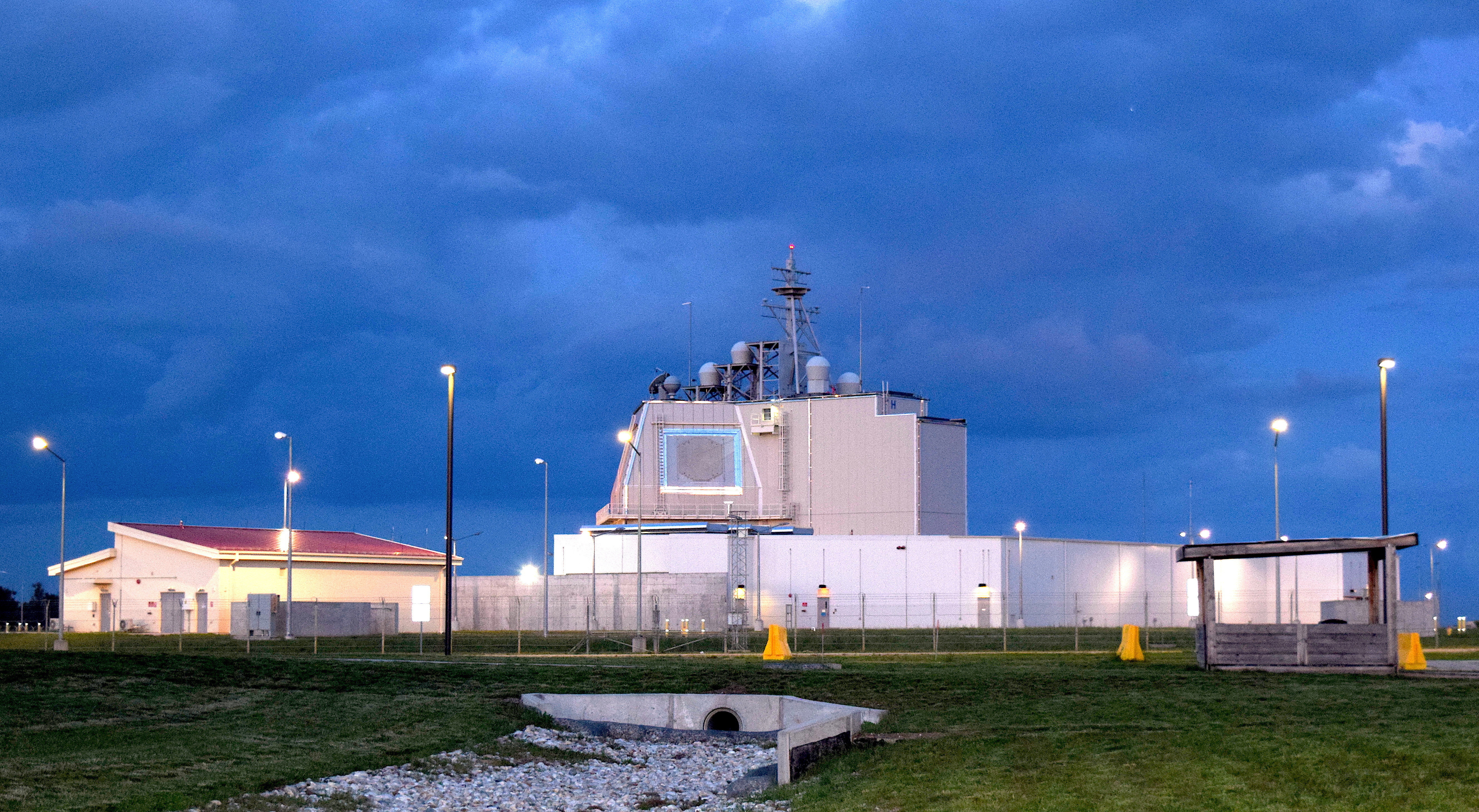
The Aegis Ashore Missile Defense Complex Romania.

In the early 2010s, the air base near Deveselu was selected for the NATO missile defence system employing Aegis Ballistic Missile Defense System. The Missile Defense Agency approved a budget of 550 million dollars for the deployment of 44 interceptors. On 1 May 2012, the 99th Military Base (Baza Militară 99) was established. Construction started in October 2013, with a ceremony attended by President Traian Băsescu and Under Secretary of Defense for Policy James N. Miller. The inauguration ceremony was held in December 2015. The Aegis Ashore Site became operational in May 2016; the system uses the SM-3 Block IB interceptor.

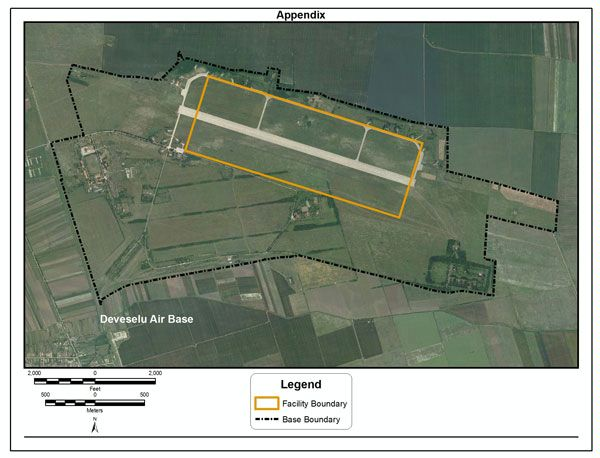
The airbase seen in 2011.

In the wake of the 2022 Russian invasion of Ukraine, the Aegis Ashore Missile Defense Complex in Deveselu has assumed an essential role for the security of the NATO Alliance; the SM-3 interceptors have the capability to destroy slower, medium-range ballistic missiles with potential nuclear payload during mid-course flight, could also probably work against hypersonic weapons.

On 29 April 2022, a ceremony was held at the base with the occasion of the 10th anniversary of its establishment. On this occasion, the military colours of the 99th Military Base Deveselu were decorated with the Order of Military Virtue.

There are about 500 Romanian soldiers, 250 U.S. troops, and other personnel working at the base. Some of the locals are concerned about a potential attack on the facility; in an interview with The World radio program, shepherd Marin Pervu said, "I'm afraid because that's my house – it's quite near; if they bomb us, it could fall in my garden."
