= USS Ross =

USS Ross has been the name of more than one United States Navy ship, and may refer to:

- USS Ross (DD-563), a destroyer in commission from 1944 to 1959.
- USS Ross (DDG-71), a destroyer commissioned in 1997.

== See also ==
- USS Lucille Ross (SP-1211)
- USS Sadie Ross (SP-736)
