= NATO missile defense system =

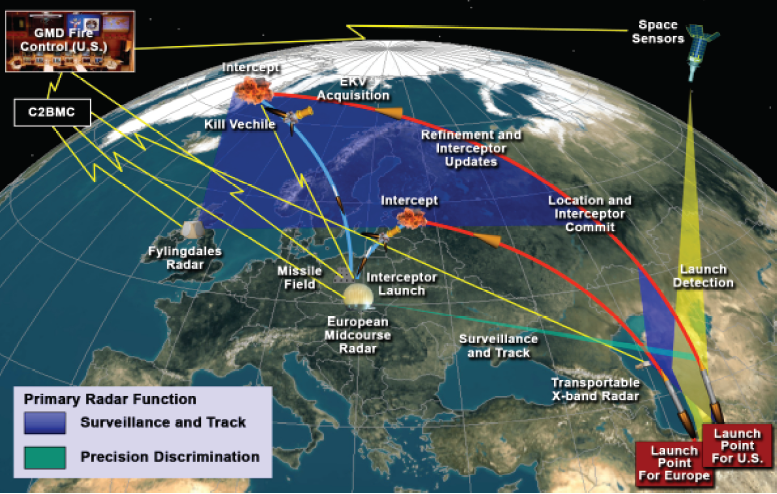
2007 US Department of Defense diagram of a NATO missile defense system response to two Iranian ballistic missile launches. Note a facility was subsequently built in Romania.

The NATO missile defense system is a missile defense system being constructed by the North Atlantic Treaty Organization (NATO) in several member states and around the Mediterranean Sea. Plans for this system have changed several times since first studied in 2002, including as a response to Russian opposition.

== Background ==
A missile defense feasibility study was launched in May 2001. The NATO Consultation, Command and Control Agency (NC3A) and NATO's Conference of National Armaments Directors (CNAD) were also involved in negotiations. The study concluded that missile defense is technically feasible, and it provided a technical basis for ongoing political and military discussions regarding the desirability of a NATO missile defense system. The United States negotiated with Poland and the Czech Republic over the course of several years after on the deployment of interceptor missiles and a radar tracking system in the two countries. Both countries' governments indicated that they would allow the deployment.

In April 2007, NATO's European allies called for a NATO missile defense system which would complement the American national missile defense system to protect Europe from missile attacks and NATO's decision-making North Atlantic Council held consultations on missile defense in the first meeting on the topic at such a senior level. In response, Russian Prime Minister Vladimir Putin claimed that such a deployment could lead to a new arms race and could enhance the likelihood of mutual destruction. He also suggested that his country would freeze its compliance with the 1990 Treaty on Conventional Armed Forces in Europe (CFE)—which limits military deployments across the continent—until all NATO countries had ratified the adapted CFE treaty. Secretary General Jaap de Hoop Scheffer claimed the system would not affect strategic balance or threaten Russia, as the plan is to base only ten interceptor missiles in Poland with an associated radar in the Czech Republic.

On 14 July 2007, Russia gave notice of its intention to suspend the CFE treaty, effective 150 days later. On 14 August 2008, the United States and Poland came to an agreement to place a base with ten interceptor missiles with associated MIM-104 Patriot air defense systems in Poland. This came at a time when tension was high between Russia and most of NATO and resulted in a nuclear threat on Poland by Russia if the building of the missile defenses went ahead. On 20 August 2008 the United States and Poland signed the agreement, while Russia sent word to Norway that it was suspending ties with NATO.

During the 2008 Bucharest Summit, the alliance further discussed the technical details as well as the political and military implications of the proposed elements of the US missile defense system in Europe. Allied leaders recognized that the planned deployment of European-based US missile defense assets would help protect many Allies, and agreed that this capability should be an integral part of any future NATO-wide missile defense architecture. In August 2008, Poland and the United States signed a preliminary deal to place part of the missile defense shield in Poland that would be linked to air-defense radar in the Czech Republic. More than 130,000 Czechs signed a petition for a referendum on the base.

On 20 March 2015, Russia's ambassador to Denmark wrote a letter to the editor of Jyllands-Posten warning the Danes that their participation in this merge of assets would make their warships targets of Russian nuclear missiles. Denmark's former Minister for Foreign Affairs Holger K. Nielsen commented that if there's a war, Danish warships will be targets in any case.

== Active Layered Theater Ballistic Missile Defense ==
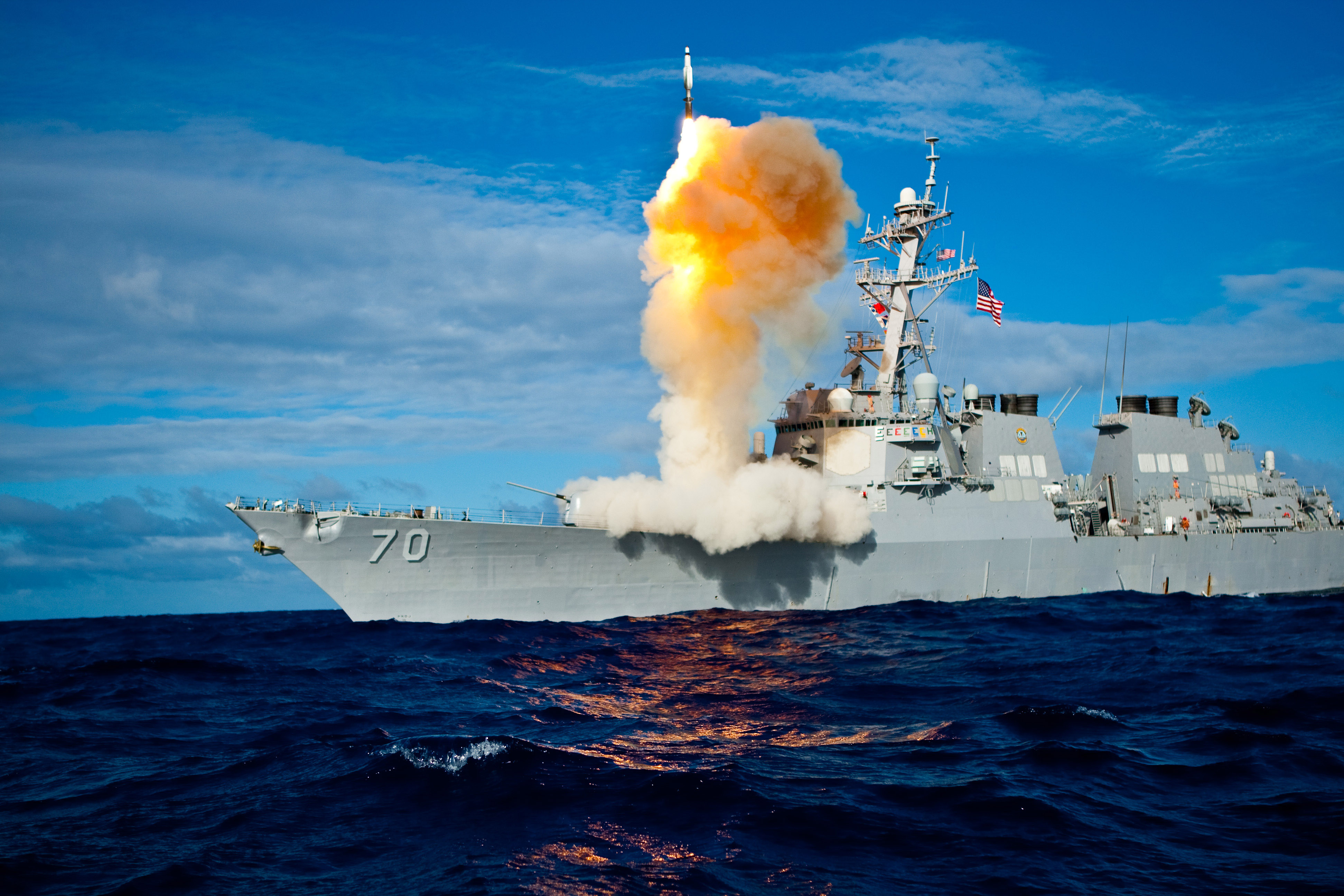
U.S. President Barack Obama proposed using the Aegis Ballistic Missile Defense System (including ship borne launchers) in 2009, replacing a planned Ground-Based Midcourse Defense system deployed in Poland and the Czech Republic.

On 17 September 2009, U.S. President Barack Obama announced that the planned deployment of long-range missile defense interceptors and equipment in Poland and the Czech Republic was not to go forward, and that a defense against short- and medium-range missiles using Aegis warships would be deployed instead. Following the change in plans, Russian President Dimitri Medvedev announced that a proposed Russian Iskander surface to surface missile deployment in nearby Kaliningrad would also not go ahead. The two deployment cancellation announcements were later followed with a statement by newly named NATO Secretary General Anders Fogh Rasmussen calling for a strategic partnership between Russia and the Alliance, explicitly involving technological cooperation of the two parties' missile defense systems.

According to a September 2009 White House Factsheet entitled "Fact Sheet on U.S. Missile Defense Policy - A "Phased, Adaptive Approach" for Missile Defense in Europe" contains the following four phases:

- Phase One (in the 2011 timeframe) – Deploy current and proven missile defense systems available in the next two years, including the sea-based Aegis Weapon System, the Standard Missile-3 (SM-3) interceptor (Block IA), and sensors such as the forward-based Army Navy/Transportable Radar Surveillance system (AN/TPY-2), to address regional ballistic missile threats to Europe and our deployed personnel and their families;
- Phase Two (in the 2015 timeframe) – After appropriate testing, deploy a more capable version of the SM-3 interceptor (Block IB) in both sea- and land-based configurations, and more advanced sensors, to expand the defended area against short- and medium-range missile threats;
- Phase Three (in the 2018 timeframe) – After development and testing are complete, deploy the more advanced SM-3 Block IIA variant under development, to counter short-, medium-, and intermediate-range missile threats; and
- Phase Four (in the 2020 timeframe) – After development and testing are complete, deploy the SM-3 Block IIB to help better cope with medium- and intermediate-range missiles and the potential future ICBM threat to the United States.

The deployment of warships equipped with the Aegis RIM-161 SM-3 missile began after Obama's speech in September 2009. These missiles complement the Patriot missile systems already deployed by American units. Though initially supportive of the plan, once USS Monterey (CG-61) was actually deployed to the Black Sea, the Russian Foreign Ministry issued a statement voicing concern about the deployment.

On 4 February 2010, Romania agreed to host the SM-3 missiles starting in 2015 at Deveselu. The first element of this revised system, the early warning radar station in Kürecik, Malatya, Turkey, went operational in 2012. The BMD component in Romania was undergoing an upgrade in May 2019; in the interim a THAAD unit, B Battery (THAAD), 62nd Air Defense Artillery Regiment, was emplaced in NSF Deveselu, Romania; the upgrade was completed August 9, 2019 and the THAAD battery has returned to its home station. Other parts of the missile defense system are planned to be built in Portugal, Poland, Romania and Spain. In September 2011, NATO invited India to be a partner in its ballistic missile defense system. V. K. Saraswat, the architect of Indian Ballistic Missile Defense Program, subsequently told the press, "We are analysing the report. It is under consideration."

Also in September 2011, the White House released a Factsheet that reports on the European Phased Adaptive Approach (EPAA). With respect to EPAA's implementation as part of the NATO missile defense in Europe the factsheet notes the four phases outlined above:

- Phase One (2011 timeframe) will address short- and medium-range ballistic missile threats by deploying current and proven missile defense systems. It calls for the deployment of Aegis Ballistic Missile Defense (BMD)-capable ships equipped with proven SM-3 Block IA interceptors. In March of this year the USS Monterey was the first in a sustained rotation of ships to deploy to the Mediterranean Sea in support of EPAA. Phase One also calls for deploying a land-based early warning radar, which Turkey agreed to host as part of the NATO missile defense plan.
- Phase Two (2015 timeframe) will expand coverage against short- and medium-range threats with the fielding of a land-based SM-3 missile defense interceptor site in Romania and the deployment of a more capable SM-3 interceptor (the Block IB). On September 13, the United States and Romania signed the U.S.-Romanian Ballistic Missile Defense Agreement. Once ratified, it will allow the United States to build, maintain, and operate the land-based BMD site in Romania. The missile defense system in Deveselu became operational on 18 December 2015.
- Phase Three (2018 timeframe) will improve coverage against medium- and intermediate-range missile threats with an additional land-based SM-3 site in Poland and the deployment of a more advanced SM-3 interceptor (the Block IIA). Poland agreed to host the interceptor site in October 2009, and today, with the Polish ratification process complete, this agreement has entered into force.
- Phase Four (2020 timeframe) will enhance the ability to counter medium- and intermediate-range missiles and potential future inter-continental ballistic missile (ICBM) threats to the United States from the Middle East, through the deployment of the SM-3 Block IIB interceptor. Each phase will include upgrades to the missile defense command and control system.

During its 2012 Chicago Summit NATO leaders declared that the NATO missile defense system has reached interim capability. Interim capability means that a basic command and control capability has been tested and installed at NATOs Headquarters Allied Air Command in Ramstein, Germany, while NATO Allies provide sensors and interceptors to connect to the system. It also means that US ships with anti-missile interceptors in the Mediterranean Sea and a Turkey-based radar system have been put under NATO command in the German base. "Our system will link together missile defense assets from different Allies – satellites, ships, radars and interceptors – under NATO command and control. It will allow us to defend against threats from outside the Euro-Atlantic area," NATO Secretary General Anders Fogh Rasmussen said.

NATO long-term goal is to merge missile defense assets provided by individual Allies into a coherent defense system so that full coverage and protection for all NATO European populations, territory and forces against the threats posed by proliferation of ballistic missiles is ensured. This goal is expected to be released sometime between the end of the 2010s and the beginning of the 2020s. To this end Spain will host four US Aegis warships at its port in Rota while Poland and Romania have agreed to host US land-based SM-3 missiles in the coming years. According to a State Department official Frank A. Rose, the United States has "offered EPAA assets to the Alliance" as an "interim BMD capability", including the AN/TPY-2 radar deployed in Turkey, which is "under NATO operational control". Rose also said that "In addition, U.S. BMD-capable Aegis ships in Europe are also now able to operate under NATO operational control when threat conditions warrant."

In 2020, the Aegis Ashore site in Poland had not yet been completed, due to incomplete auxiliary controls for heating, power, and cooling. Missile Defense Agency's Vice Admiral Jon Hill was to announce in February 2020 whether another contractor would be required. By 2018 the Aegis SM-3 Block IB missiles were already on-site in Poland; the Aegis Ashore Ballistic Missile Defense System in Romania is operational. The Aegis Ashore site in Poland became operational in summer 2024.

A 2012 GAO report found that the phase four interceptors may be poorly placed and of the wrong type to defend the United States. This capability was planned to be in place by 2020, but this has "been delayed to at least 2022 due to cuts in congressional funding."

Some Republicans including Mitt Romney, Dick Cheney and John McCain have called Obama's changes from the system Bush proposed a "gift" to Vladimir Putin, but Gates wrote in Duty: Memoirs of a Secretary at War that the change was made to ensure a more effective defense for Europe.

== National systems ==
Poland has sought cooperation with France and Germany in the establishment of a joint missile defense system.

== See also ==
- Destroyer Squadron 60
- European Sky Shield Initiative
- Missile defense systems by country
