= Medium Extended Air Defense System =

Air- and missile-defense system

The Medium Extended Air Defense System (MEADS) was a ground-mobile air and missile defense system that was intended in the 2020s to replace the Patriot missile system through a NATO-managed development. The program was a development of the United States, Germany and Italy.

The design of MEADS was aimed at addressing the shortcomings of fielded systems and to permit full interoperability between U.S. and allied forces. Germany chose MEADS to replace their MIM-104 Patriot systems in June 2015, but the program was later cancelled. It was superseded in the US by the Lower Tier Air and Missile Defense Sensor (LTAMDS) as a component of the Patriot system.

== Description ==
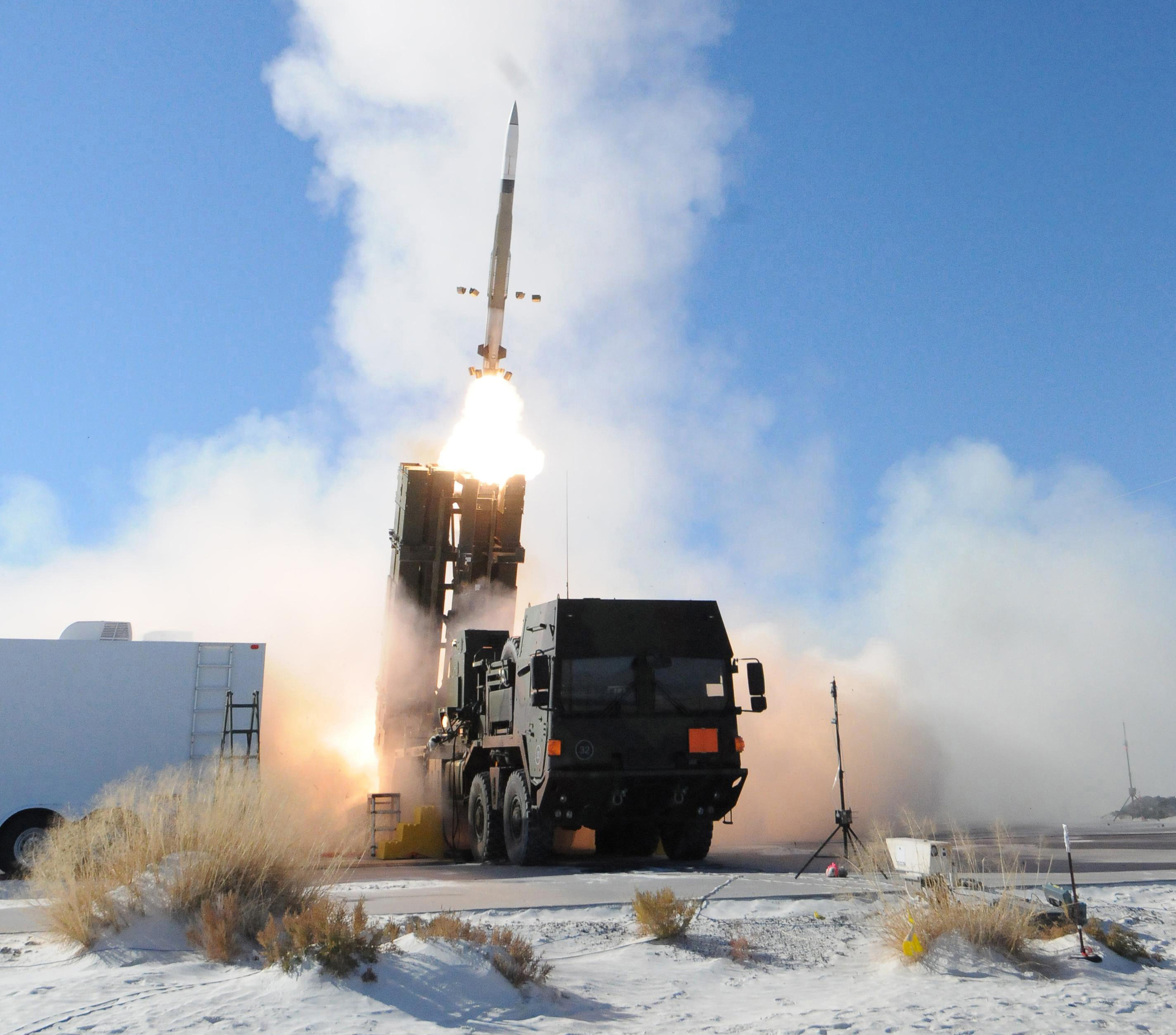
The Medium Extended Air Defense System (MEADS) intercepted and destroyed two simultaneous targets attacking from opposite directions during a demonstration of its 360-degree capabilities at White Sands Missile Range in New Mexico.

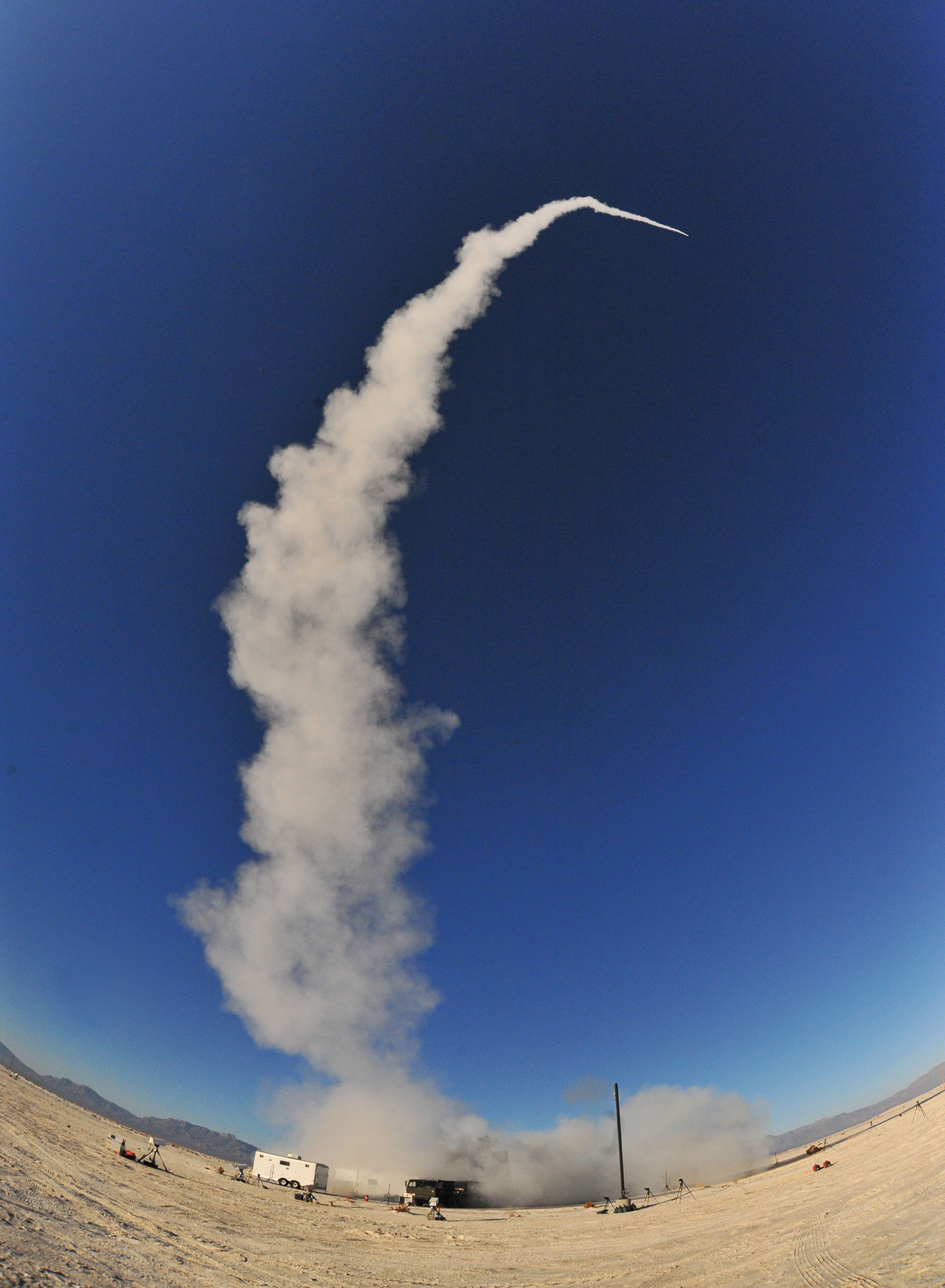
MEADS Over-the-Shoulder Launch at White Sands (MEADS International)

MEADS provides ground-mobile air and missile defense with expanded coverage. The system provides enhanced force protection against a broad array of third-dimension threats. Improved interoperability, mobility, and full 360-degree defense capability against the evolving threat represent are key aspects. MEADS is the first air and missile defense (AMD) system that provides continuous on-the-move protection for maneuver forces. MEADS also provides area defense, homeland defense, and weighted asset protection.

MEADS incorporates the Lockheed Martin Missiles and Fire Control hit-to-kill PAC-3 Missile Segment Enhancement (MSE) missile in a system including 360-degree surveillance and fire control sensors, netted-distributed tactical operations centers, and lightweight launchers. A single MEADS battery is able to defend up to 8 times the area of a Patriot battery through use of advanced 360-degree sensors, near-vertical launch capability, and the longer-range PAC-3 MSE missile. The MEADS radars – using active phased arrays and digital beam forming – enable full use of the PAC-3 MSE missile's extended range.

Truck-mounted MEADS elements drive or roll on and off C-130 and A400M transport aircraft so they are quickly deployed to a theater of operations. Because MEADS uses fewer system assets, it permits a substantial reduction in deployed personnel and equipment. MEADS reduces demand for airlift, so it can deploy to theater faster.

The minimum MEADS engagement capability requires only one launcher, one battle manager, and one fire control radar to provide 360-degree defense of troops or critical assets. As more system elements arrive, they automatically and seamlessly join the MEADS network and build out capability.

The prime contractor, MEADS International, is a multinational joint venture headquartered in Orlando, Florida. Its participating companies are MBDA Italia, MBDA Deutschland GmbH, and Lockheed Martin. The company initially won a competitive downselect to develop the MEADS system in 1999, but the program could not be started because the losing competitor filed two successive suits. In 2001, a $216 million Risk Reduction Effort contract was awarded to incorporate a new interceptor approach. In May 2005, MEADS International signed a definitized contract valued at $2 billion plus €1.4 billion for MEADS design and development. This development contract was completed in 2014. The U.S. funded 58 percent of the MEADS Design and Development program, with European partners Germany and Italy providing 25 percent and 17 percent respectively.

The German Bundeswehr completed an analysis of air defense alternatives in 2010 and strongly recommended MEADS as the basis for improving Germany's missile defense shield and as Germany's contribution to the European Phased Adaptive Approach. In February 2011, the U.S. Department of Defense announced that it intended to fulfill its commitment to complete the design and development effort, but that it would not procure the MEADS system for budgetary reasons. Lockheed Martin developed an interactive life cycle cost and capabilities application based on their Dynamic Comparative Analysis Methodology (DCAM) approach to more fully evaluate and communicate the performance and cost advantage of MEADS as compared to alternative systems. The DCAM application further reinforced the value of MEADS and is credited with helping ensure continued funding.

In October 2011, the National Armaments Directors of Germany, Italy, and the U.S. approved a contract amendment to fund two flight intercept tests, a launcher/missile characterization test, and a sensor characterization test conducted to complete the planned development scope.

In September 2013, MEADS received operating certification for Mode 5 interrogation in its Identification friend or foe (IFF) system. Mode 5 is more secure and provides positive line-of-sight identification of friendly platforms equipped with an IFF transponder to better protect allied forces.

In June 2015, MEADS was selected as the basis for the German Taktisches Luftverteidigungssystem (TLVS), a new generation of air and missile defense that requires flexible architecture based on strong networking capabilities. MEADS was a candidate for Poland's Wisła medium range air defense system procurement, but was eliminated in June 2014 when competition was downselected to the US Patriot system and the French/Italian SAMP/T system. However, Lockheed Martin began renewed discussions with the Polish Ministry of Defense in February 2016 leading to a formal request for information in September 2016. MEADS remains a candidate for Poland's Narew short range air defense system procurement.

== Major equipment items ==
The MEADS air and missile defense system is composed of six major equipment items. The MEADS radars, battle manager, and launchers are designed for high reliability so that the system will be able to maintain sustained operations much longer than legacy systems, resulting in overall lower operation and support costs.

=== Multifunction Fire Control Radar (MFCR) ===
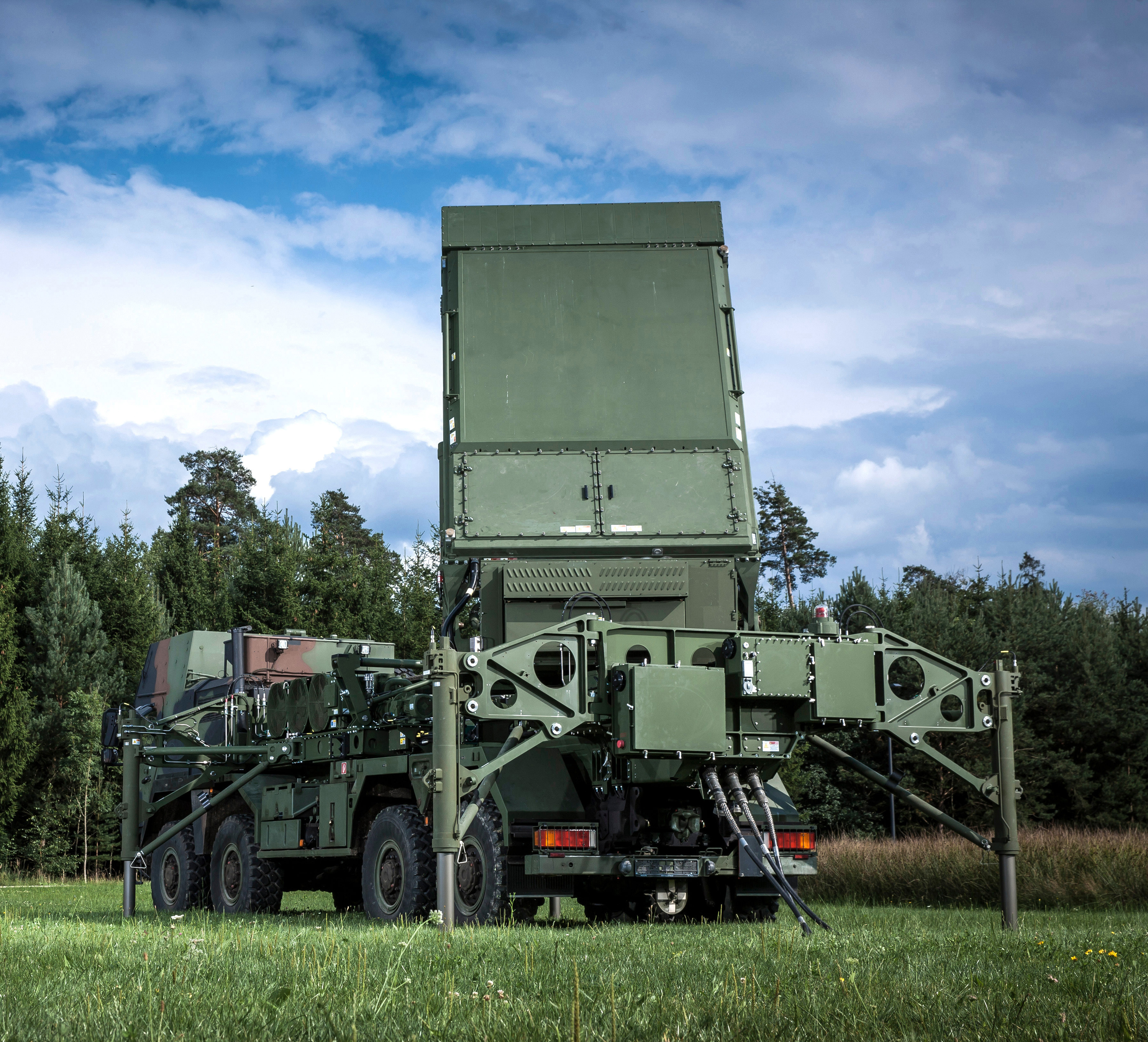
The MEADS Multifunction Fire Control Radar, shown in its German configuration, can detect and track advanced threats with 360-degree coverage and no blind spots.

An X-band, solid-state, active electronically scanned array (AESA) radar using element-level transmit/receive modules developed in Germany. The MMIC is supplied by the Selex Sistemi Integrati foundry in Rome. The photonics foundry in Rome supplies lithium niobate (LiNbO_{3}) components for the radar. The MFCR radar provides precision tracking and wideband discrimination and classification capabilities. For extremely rapid deployments, the MEADS MFCR can provide both surveillance and fire control capabilities until a surveillance radar joins the network. The MFCR uses its main beam for uplink and downlink missile communications. An advanced Mode 5 identification friend-or-foe subsystem supports improved threat identification and typing.

=== Surveillance Radar (SR) ===
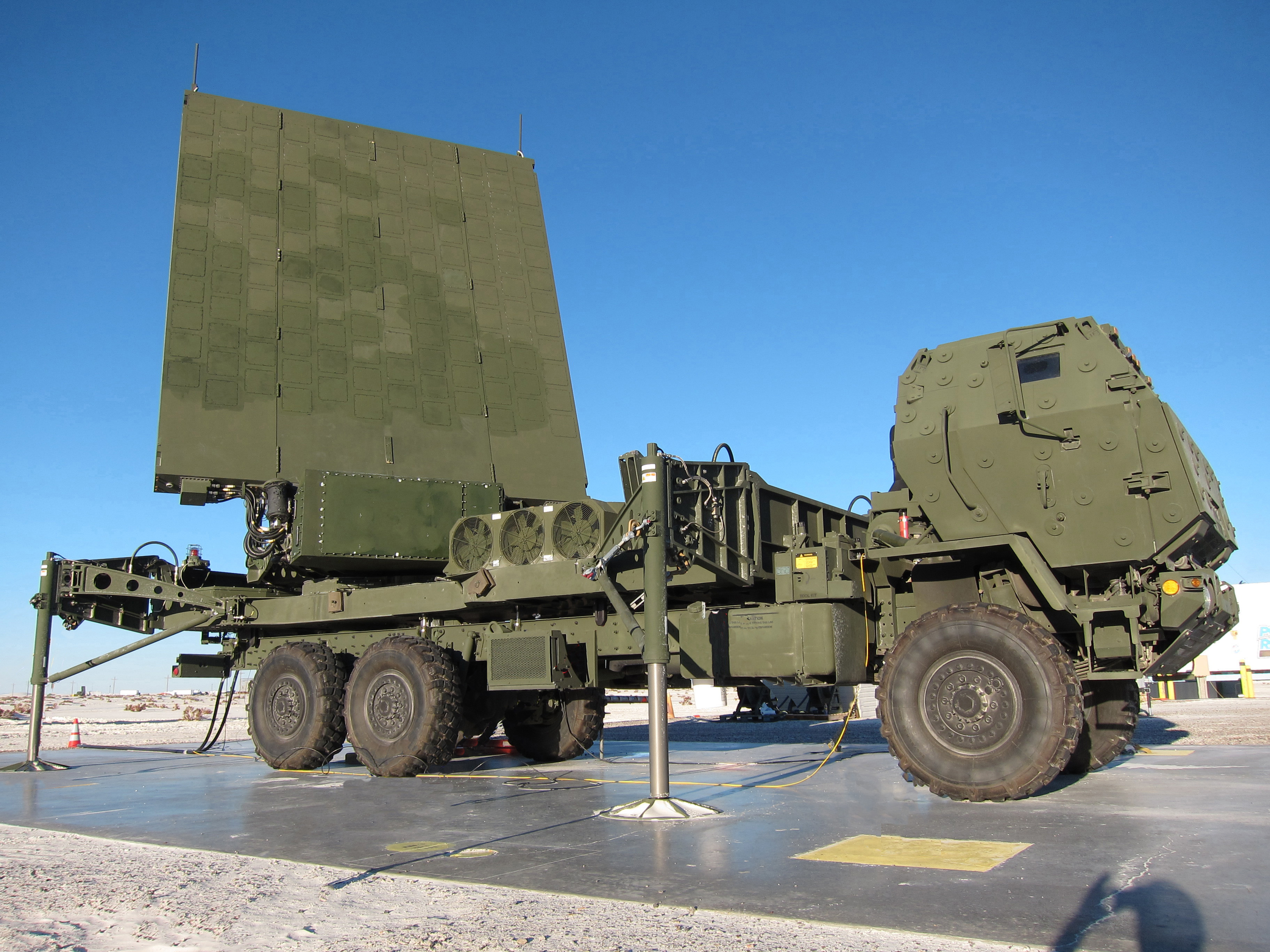
A MEADS Surveillance Radar acquired both targets and provided target cues to the MEADS battle manager during a dual-intercept flight test at White Sands Missile Range in November 2013.

The UHF MEADS Surveillance Radar is a 360-degree active electronically steered array radar that provides extended range coverage. It provides threat detection capability against highly maneuverable low-signature threats, including short- and medium-range ballistic missiles, cruise missiles, and other air-breathing threats.

=== Tactical Operations Center (TOC) ===
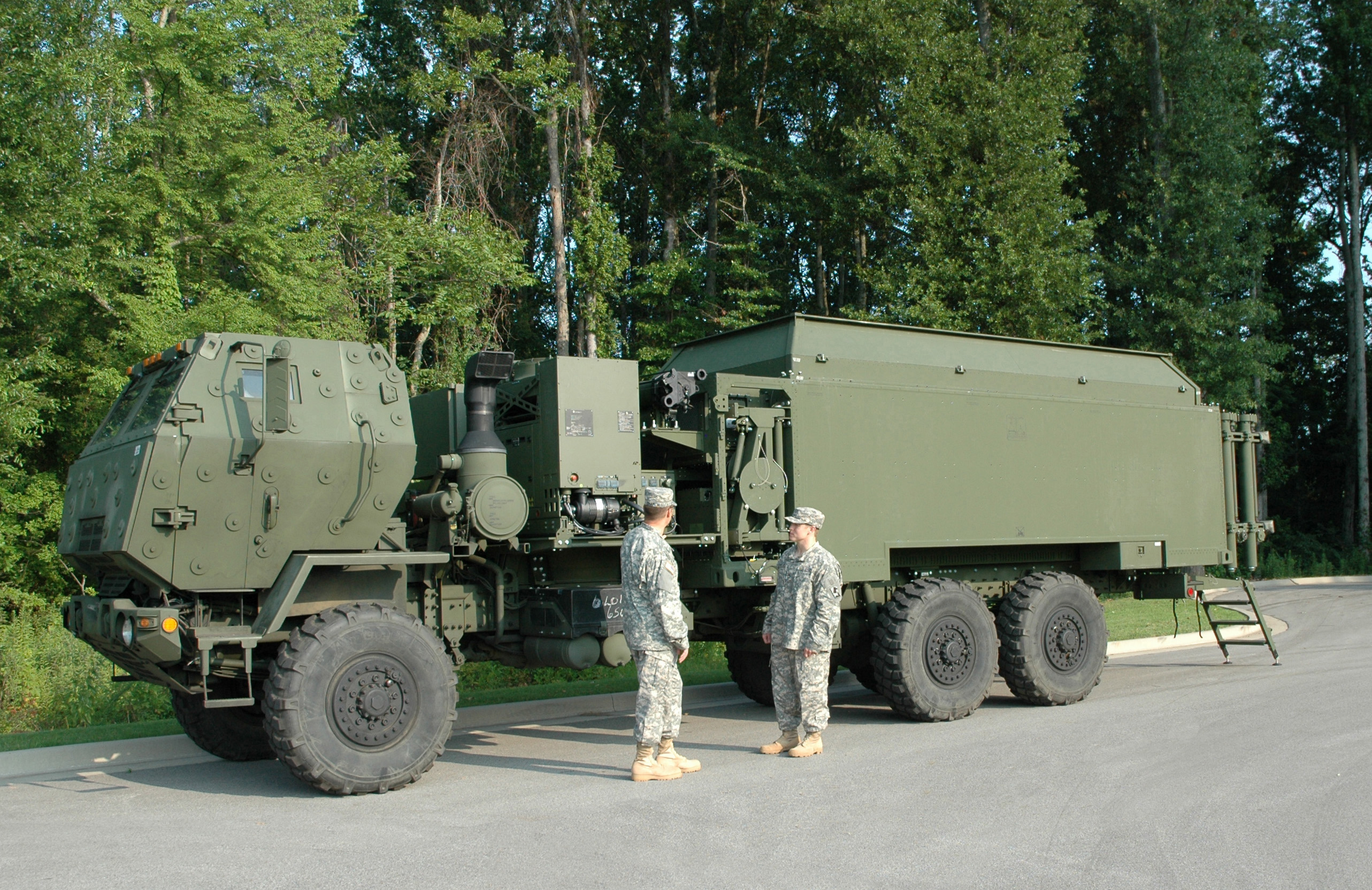
From the MEADS battle manager, a commander can add or subtract sensors and launchers as the situation dictates without shutting down the system.

The MEADS TOC provides battle management and C4I (command, control, computers, communications, and intelligence). It controls an advanced network-centric open architecture that allows any combination of sensors and launchers to be organized into a single air and missile defense battle element. The system is netted and distributed. Every MEADS battle manager, radar, and launcher is a wireless node on the network. By virtue of multiple communications paths, the network can be expanded or contracted as the situation dictates and precludes single point failure if one node becomes inoperable. It also has a plug-and-fight capability that allows MEADS launchers and radars to seamlessly enter and leave the network without shutting it down and interrupting ongoing operations. MEADS uses open, non-proprietary standardized interfaces to extend plug-and-fight to non-MEADS elements. This flexibility is new for ground-based AMD systems.

=== Launcher and Reloader ===
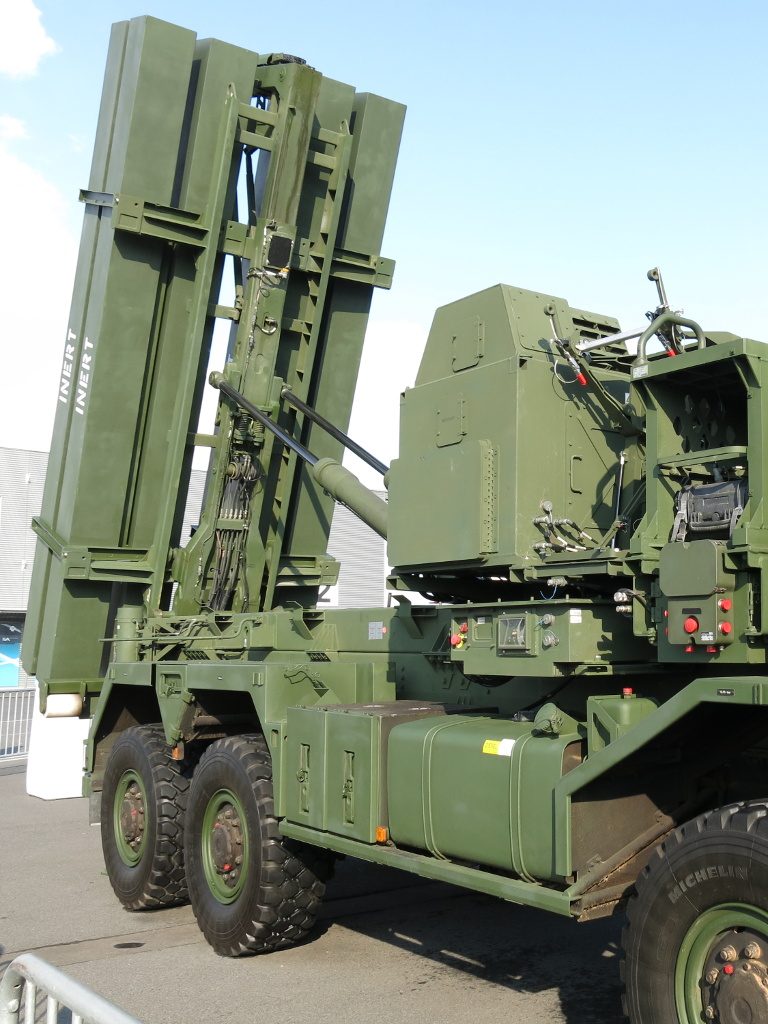
MEADS launcher with eight PAC-3 MSE launching canisters

The lightweight MEADS launcher is easily transportable, tactically mobile, and capable of rapid reload. It carries up to eight PAC-3 Missile Segment Enhancement (MSE) Missiles and achieves launch readiness in minimum time. A MEADS reloader is similar but lacks launcher electronic systems.

=== Certified Missile Round ===
==== PAC-3 MSE ====
The PAC-3 Missile Segment Enhancement (MSE) missile is the baseline interceptor for MEADS. The interceptor increases the system's range and lethality over the baseline PAC-3 missile, which was selected as the primary missile for MEADS when the design and development program began in 2004. The MSE missile increases the engagement envelope and defended area by using more responsive control surfaces and a more powerful rocket motor.

==== IRIS-T SL ====
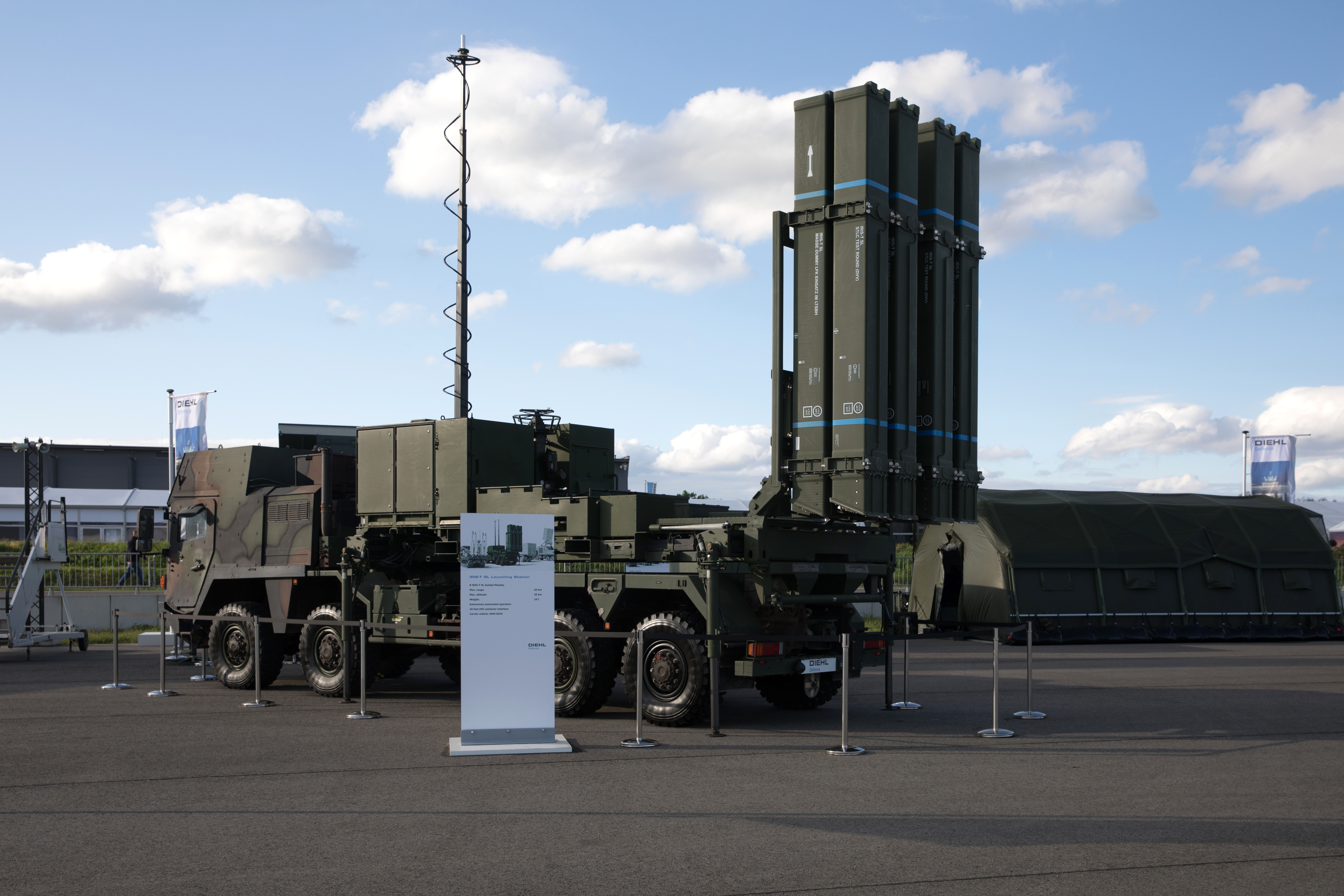
Diehl IRIS-T SL launcher at ILA-2018

In Germany, the PAC-3 MSE missile is expected to be supplemented by IRIS-T SLM as secondary missile for ground-based medium range air defense. It is based on the IRIS-T air-to-air missile equipped with an enlarged rocket motor, datalink, and jettisonable drag-reducing nose cone.

== Plug-and-fight ==
In the BMC4I TOC, plug-and-fight flexibility lets MEADS exchange data with non-MEADS sensors and shooters. The same capability lets MEADS move with ground forces and interoperate with allied forces. Through interoperability features designed into the system, MEADS will dramatically improve combat effectiveness and situational awareness, reducing the possibility of friendly fire incidents. MEADS system elements can seamlessly integrate into each nation's, or NATO's, combat architecture as required.

Units can be dispersed over a wide area. Command and control of launchers and missiles can be handed over to a neighboring battle management unit while the initial systems are moved, maintaining maneuver force protection. Plug-and-fight connectivity lets MEADS elements attach to and detach from the network at will, with no requirement to shut the system down.

The MEADS plug-and-fight capability enables command and control over other air and missile defense system elements through open, non-proprietary standardized interfaces. MEADS implements a unique ability to work with secondary missile systems if selected, and to evolve as other capabilities are developed.

== Integration and test history ==
In July 2010, the MEADS BMC4I demonstrated its interoperability with the NATO Air Command and Control System (ACCS) during tests using the Active Layer Theatre Ballistic Missile Defense (ALTBMD) Integration Test Bed being developed by NATO. The test was an early maturity demonstration for the MEADS BMC4I capability.

In August 2010, the MEADS program completed an extensive series of Critical Design Review (CDR) events with a Summary CDR at MEADS International. Reviewers from Germany, Italy, the U.S., and the NATO Medium Extended Air Defense System Management Agency (NAMEADSMA) evaluated the MEADS design criteria in a comprehensive series of 47 reviews.

In December 2010, the first MEADS launcher and Tactical Operations Center were displayed in ceremonies in Germany and Italy before initiating system integration tests at Pratica di Mare Air Force Base in Italy.

In November 2011, it was announced that the MEADS Multifunction Fire Control Radar had been integrated with a MEADS TOC and launcher at Pratica di Mare Air Force Base. The objectives of the integration test series were to demonstrate that the MEADS TOC could control the MEADS MFCR in coordination with the MEADS Launcher as initial operational proof of the plug-and-fight capability. The MFCR demonstrated key functionalities including 360-degree target acquisition and track using both dedicated flights and other air traffic. Then, at White Sands Missile Range, MEADS demonstrated a first-ever over-the-shoulder launch of the PAC-3 MSE missile against a simulated target attacking from behind. It required a unique sideways maneuver, demonstrating a 360-degree capability. The missile executed a planned self-destruct sequence at the end of the mission after successfully engaging the simulated threat.

In November 2012 at White Sands Missile Range, MEADS detected, tracked, intercepted, and destroyed an air-breathing target in an intercept flight test. The test configuration included a networked MEADS Tactical Operations Center, lightweight launcher firing a PAC-3 MSE, and a 360-degree MEADS Multifunction Fire Control Radar, which tracked the MQM-107 target and guided the missile to a successful intercept.

Several progress milestones were demonstrated during 2013, culminating in a 360-degree dual-intercept test that went beyond initial contract objectives. In April, the MEADS Surveillance Radar acquired and tracked a small test aircraft and relayed its location to a MEADS TOC, which generated cue search commands. The MFCR, in full 360-degree rotating mode, searched the cued area, acquired the target, and established a dedicated track.

In June 2013, during six days of testing, MEADS demonstrated network interoperability with NATO systems during Joint Project Optic Windmill (JPOW) exercises. MEADS demonstrated battle management capability to transmit, receive, and process Link 16 messages and to conduct threat engagements.

In November 2013, MEADS intercepted and destroyed two simultaneous targets attacking from opposite directions during a stressing demonstration of its 360-degree AMD capabilities at White Sands Missile Range, New Mexico. All elements of the MEADS system were tested, including the 360-degree MEADS Surveillance Radar, a networked MEADS battle manager, two lightweight launchers firing PAC-3 Missile Segment Enhancement (MSE) Missiles and a 360-degree MEADS Multifunction Fire Control Radar (MFCR). The flight test achieved all criteria for success.

The first target, a QF-4 air-breathing target, approached from the south. Simultaneously a MGM-52 Lance missile, flying a tactical ballistic missile trajectory, attacked from the north. The Surveillance Radar acquired both targets and provided target cues to the MEADS battle manager, which generated cue commands for the MFCR. The MFCR tracked both targets successfully and guided missiles from launchers in the Italian and German configurations to successful intercepts.

At White Sands Missile Range, Lockheed Martin and Northrop Grumman also demonstrated plug-and-fight connectivity between MEADS and the U.S. Army's Integrated Battle Command System (IBCS). IBCS demonstrated ability to plug-and-fight a 360-degree MEADS Surveillance Radar and Multifunction Fire Control Radar.

In July 2014, MEADS completed a comprehensive system demonstration at Pratica di Mare Air Base, Italy. The tests, including operational demonstrations run by German and Italian military personnel, were designed to seamlessly add and subtract system elements under representative combat conditions, and to blend MEADS with other systems in a larger system architecture. All criteria for success were achieved.

During the test, plug-and-fight capability to rapidly attach and control an external Italian deployable air defense radar was demonstrated. Also demonstrated was engage-on-remote flexibility, which allows operators to target threats at greater distances despite being masked by terrain. Through reassigning workload, MEADS demonstrated ability to maintain defense capabilities if any system element is lost or fails.

Interoperability with German and Italian air defense assets was demonstrated through exchange of standardized NATO messages. Italian air-defense assets were integrated into a test bed at an Italian national facility, while the Surface to Air Missile Operations Centre and Patriot assets were integrated into a test bed at the German Air Force Air Defense Center in Fort Bliss, Texas. MEADS further demonstrated capability to perform engagement coordination with other systems, which fielded system are unable to do.

In September 2014, MEADS MFCRs completed a six-week performance test at Pratica di Mare Air Base, Italy, and MBDA Deutschland's air defense center in Freinhausen. During the tests, the MEADS MFCR successfully demonstrated several advanced capabilities, many of which are critical for ground-mobile radar systems. Capabilities tested include tracking and canceling of jamming signals; searching, cueing and tracking in ground clutter; and successfully classifying target data using kinematic information.

On 9 June 2015, Defense Minister Ursula von der Leyen announced that Germany had selected MEADS as the foundation for its Taktisches Luftverteidigungssystem (TLVS), which is planned to replace Germany's Patriot systems. In January 2017, MEADS International presented an updated offer for Poland's medium-range air defense (Wisła) program to Poland's Ministry of National Defense.

== See also ==
- Missile defense
- Freyja (missile system)
- S-300VM missile system
- S-400 missile system
- S-500 missile system - Next-generation Russian anti-ballistic missile
- Ground-Based Midcourse Defense - U.S. anti-ballistic missile system
- Active electronically scanned array – an active electronically scanned array radar is a type of phased array radar whose transmitter and receiver functions are composed of numerous small solid-state transmit/receive modules (TRMs)
- Plug-and-fight – ability of system elements to attach to and detach from the network at will, with no requirement to shut the system down.
- Integrated Air and Missile Defense Battle Command System (IBCS) – U.S. Army program to integrate AN/MPQ-64 Sentinel, AN/MPQ-65A and GhostEye (MIM-104 Patriot), GhostEye MR (NASAMS), AN/TPY-2 (THAAD and GMD), AN/SPY-1 and AN/SPY-6 (Aegis BMD), and AN/APG-81 (F-35 Lightning II) radars
- LFK NG – new air defense missile of the German Army
- MANTIS – the very short-range protection system of the German Army within the "SysFla" program.
- NASAMS – air defense system using the AIM-120 AMRAAM, developed by Norway.
- Type 3 Chū-SAM
