= Missile defense =

System that destroys attacking missiles

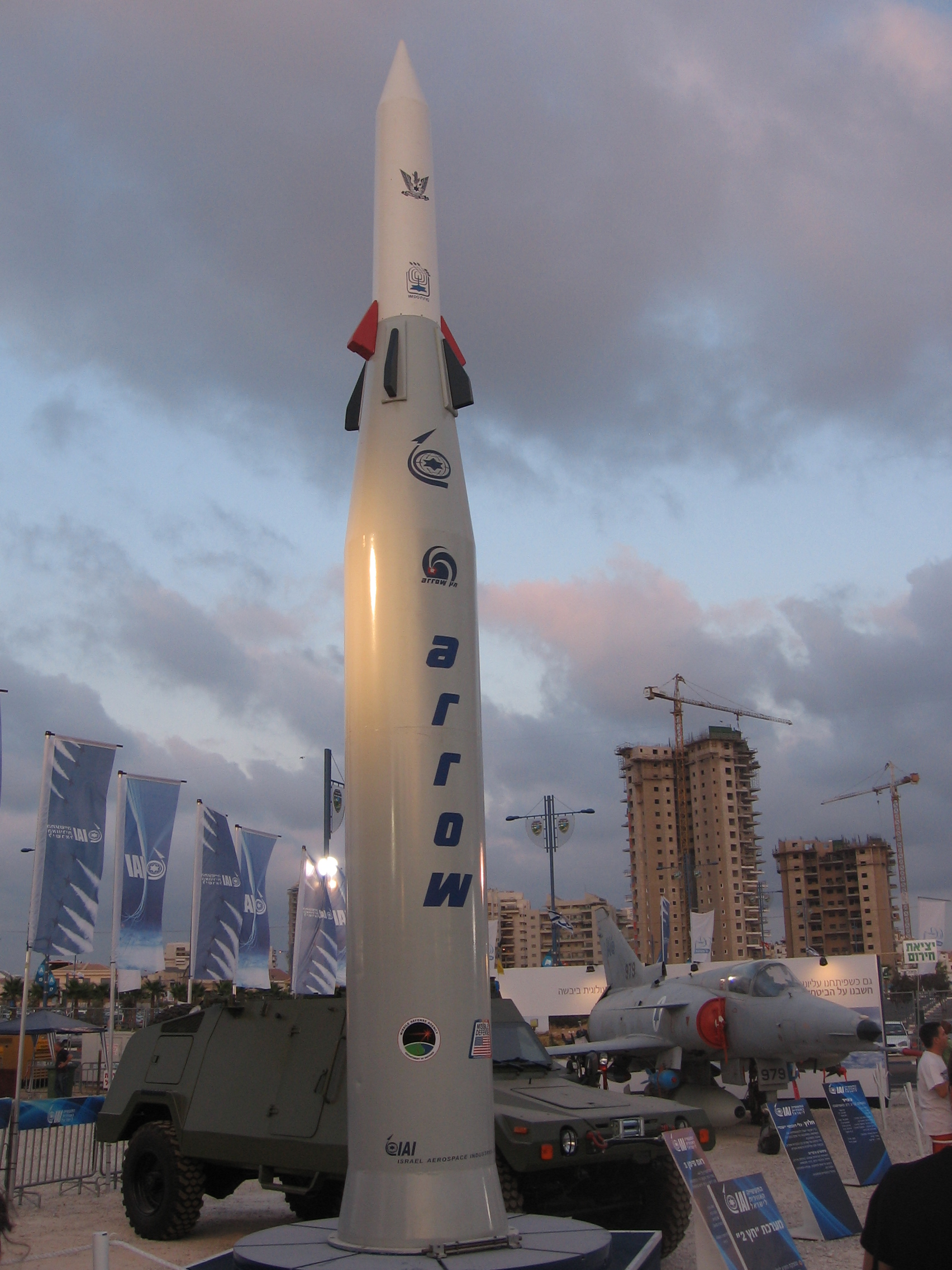
The Arrow 2 anti-ballistic missile

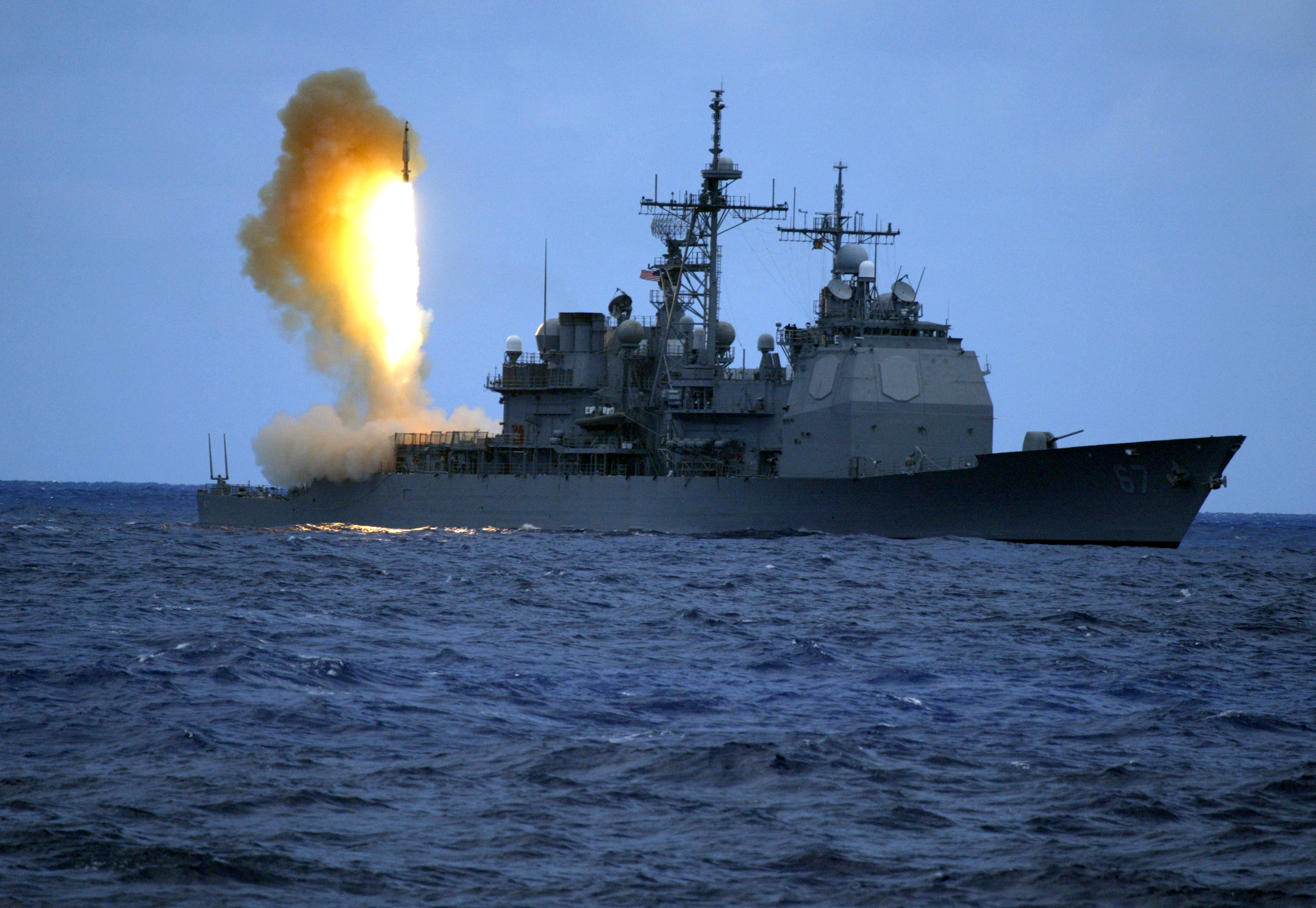
The Aegis Ballistic Missile Defense System. A RIM-161 Standard Missile 3 anti-ballistic missile is launched from USS Shiloh, a US Navy Ticonderoga-class cruiser.

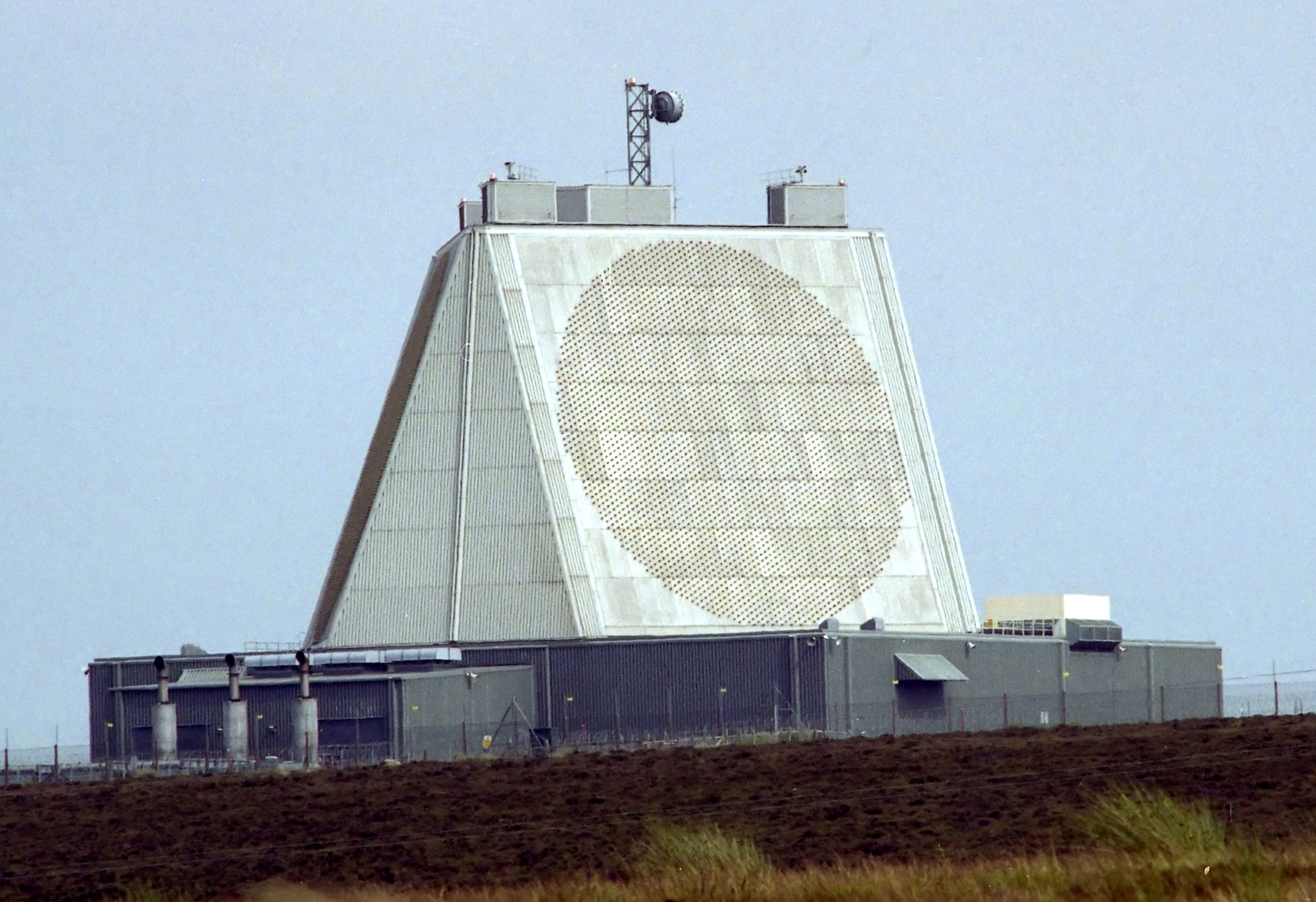
Phased Array Ballistic Missile Early Warning System at RAF Fylingdales

Missile defense is a system, weapon, or technology involved in the detection, tracking, interception, and also the destruction of attacking missiles. Conceived as a defense against nuclear-armed intercontinental ballistic missiles (ICBMs), its application has broadened to include shorter-ranged non-nuclear tactical and theater missiles.

China, France, India, Iran, Israel, Italy, Russia, Taiwan, the United Kingdom and the United States have all developed such air defense systems.

== Missile defense categories ==
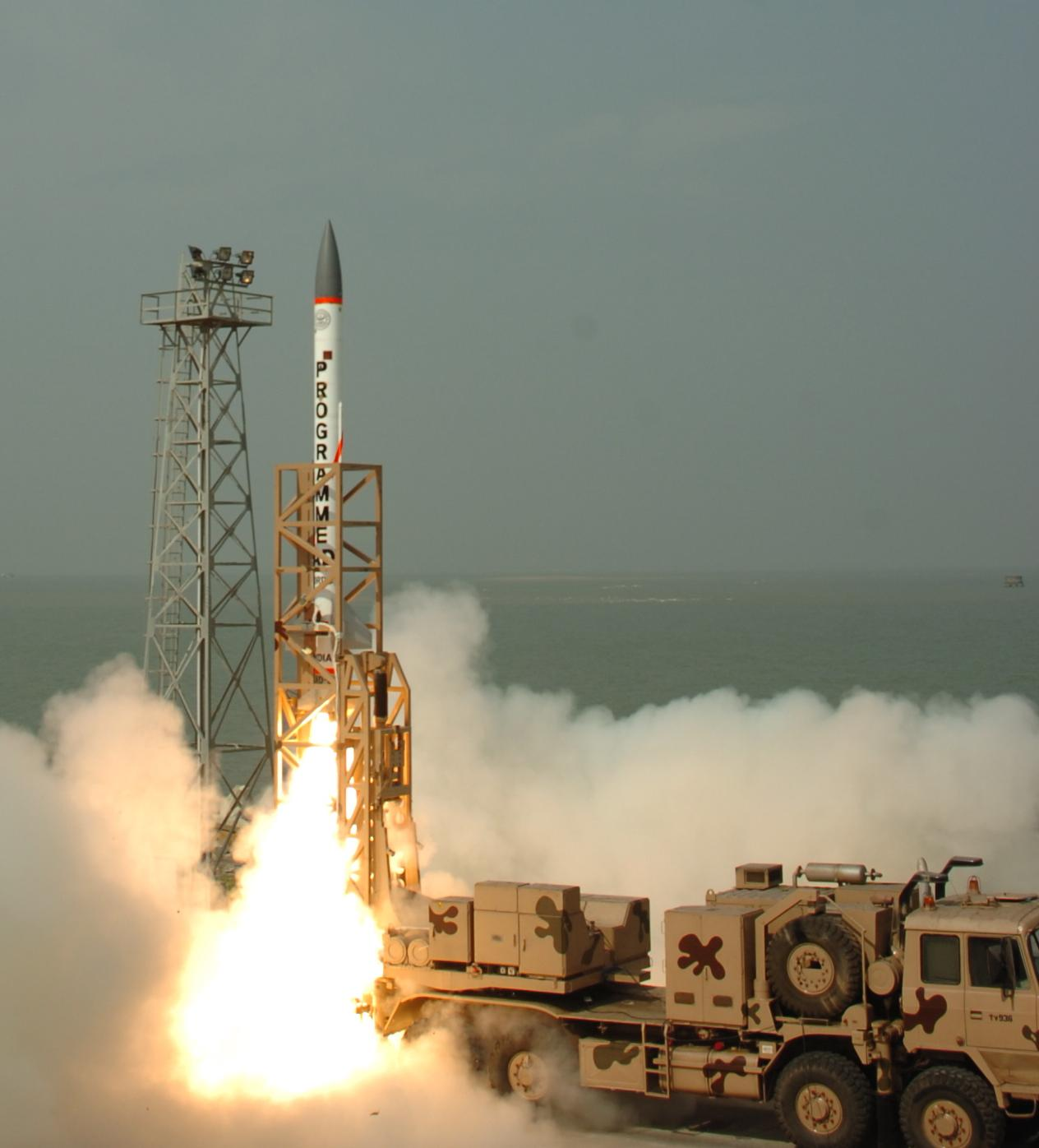
India's Advanced Air Defense (AAD) endo-atmospheric anti-ballistic missile

Missile defense can be divided into categories based on various characteristics: type/range of missile intercepted, the trajectory phase where the intercept occurs, and whether intercepted inside or outside the Earth's atmosphere:

=== Type/range of missile intercepted ===
These types/ranges include strategic, theater and tactical. Each entails unique requirements for intercept; a defensive system capable of intercepting one missile type frequently cannot intercept others. However, there is sometimes overlap in capability.

==== Strategic ====
Targets long-range ICBMs, which travel at about 7 km/s (15,700 mph). Examples of currently active systems: Russian A-135, which defends Moscow, the US Ground-Based Midcourse Defense that defends the United States from missiles launched from Asia and the Israeli Arrow 3 which defends Israel from ICBMs. Geographic range of strategic defense can be regional (Russian system) or national (US and Israeli systems).

==== Theater ====
Targets medium-range missiles, which travel at about 3 km/s (6,700 mph) or less. In this context, the term "theater" means the entire localized region for military operations, typically a radius of several hundred kilometers; defense range of these systems is usually on this order. Examples of deployed theater missile defenses: Israeli Arrow 2 missile and David's Sling, American THAAD, and Russian S-400.

==== Tactical ====
Targets short-range tactical ballistic missiles, which usually travel at less than 1.5 km/s (3,400 mph). Tactical anti-ballistic missiles (ABMs) have short ranges, typically 20–80 km (12–50 mi). Examples of currently-deployed tactical ABMs are the Israeli Iron Dome, American MIM-104 Patriot and Russian S-300V.

=== Trajectory phase ===
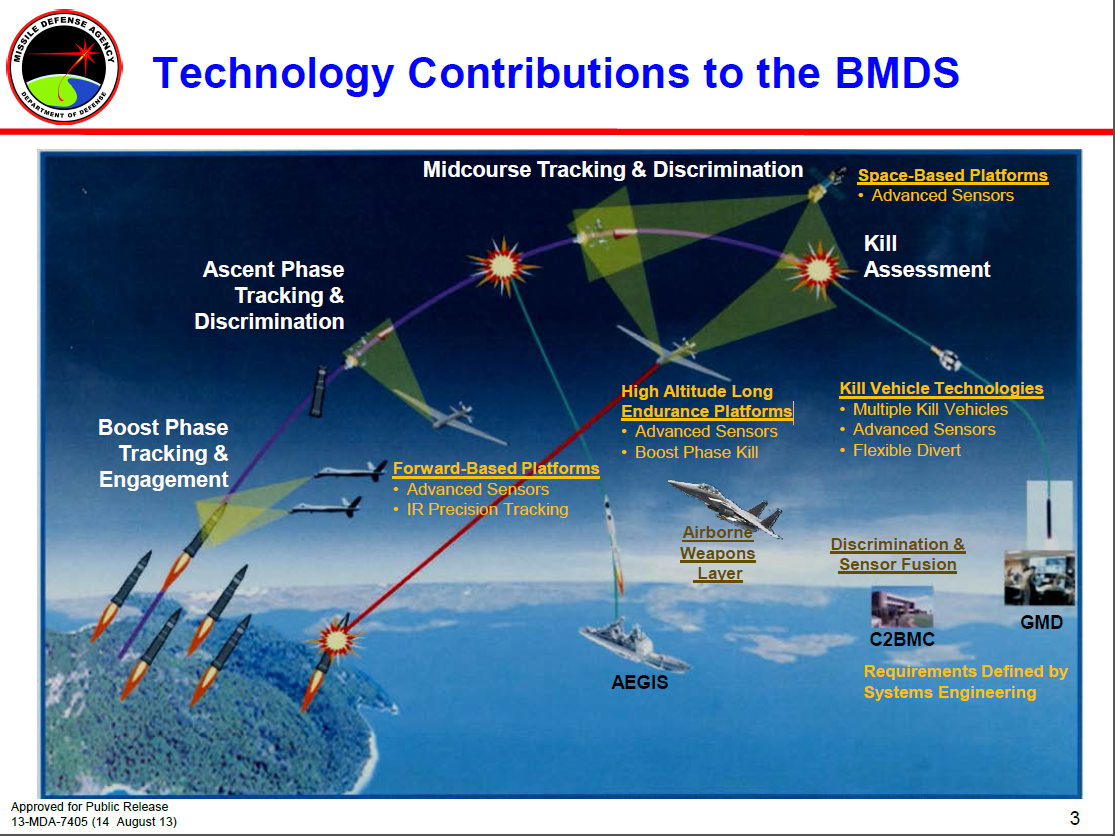
Trajectory phases

Ballistic missiles can be intercepted in three regions of their trajectory: boost phase, midcourse phase, or terminal phase.

==== Boost phase ====
Intercepting the missile while its rocket motors are firing, usually over the launch territory.

Advantages:

- Bright, hot rocket exhaust makes detection and targeting easier.
- Decoys cannot be used during boost phase.
- At this stage, the missile is full of flammable propellant, which makes it very vulnerable to explosive warheads.

Disadvantages:

- Difficult to geographically position interceptors to intercept missiles in boost phase (not always possible without flying over hostile territory).
- Short time for intercept (typically about 180 seconds).

==== Mid-course phase ====
Intercepting the missile in space after the rocket burns out (example: American Ground-Based Midcourse Defense (GMD), Chinese SC-19 & DN-series missiles, Israeli Arrow 3 missile).

Advantages:

- Extended decision/intercept time (the coast period through space before reentering the atmosphere can be several minutes, up to 20 minutes for an ICBM).
- Very large geographic defensive coverage; potentially continental.

Disadvantages:

- Requires large, heavy anti-ballistic missiles and sophisticated powerful radar which must often be augmented by space-based sensors.
- Must handle potential space-based decoys.

==== Terminal phase ====
Intercepting the missile after it reenters the atmosphere (examples: American Aegis Ballistic Missile Defense System, Chinese HQ-19, American THAAD, American Sprint, Russian ABM-3 Gazelle, Indian AAD)

Advantages:

- Smaller, lighter anti-ballistic missile is sufficient.
- Balloon decoys do not work during reentry.
- Smaller, less sophisticated radar required.

Disadvantages:

- Very short intercept time, possibly less than 30 seconds.
- Less defended geographic coverage.
- Possible blanketing of target area with hazardous materials in the case of detonation of nuclear warhead(s).

=== Intercept location relative to the atmosphere ===
Missile defense can take place either inside (endoatmospheric) or outside (exoatmospheric) the Earth's atmosphere. The trajectory of most ballistic missiles takes them inside and outside the Earth's atmosphere, and they can be intercepted in either place. There are advantages and disadvantages to either intercept technique.

Some missiles such as THAAD can intercept both inside and outside the Earth's atmosphere, giving two intercept opportunities.

==== Endoatmospheric ====
Endoatmospheric anti-ballistic missiles are usually shorter ranged (e.g., American MIM-104 Patriot, Indian Advanced Air Defence).

Advantages:

- Physically smaller and lighter
- Easier to move and deploy
- Endoatmospheric intercept means balloon-type decoys won't work

Disadvantages:

- Limited range and defended area
- Limited decision and tracking time for the incoming warhead

==== Exoatmospheric ====
Exoatmospheric anti-ballistic missiles are usually longer-ranged (e.g., American GMD, Ground-Based Midcourse Defense).

Advantages:

- More decision and tracking time
- Fewer missiles required for defense of a larger area
- May be able to destroy multiple weapon/decoy equipped targets before staging

Disadvantages:

- Larger and heavier missiles required
- More difficult to transport and place compared to smaller missiles
- May need to handle decoys

== Countermeasures to missile defense ==
Given the immense variety by which a defense system can operate (targeting nuclear-armed intercontinental ballistic missiles (ICBMs), tactical, and theater missiles), there are some unarguably effective exoatmospheric (outside the Earth's atmosphere) countermeasures an attacking party can use to deter or completely defend against certain types of defense systems, ranges of ACBM's, and intercept locations. Many of defenses to these countermeasures have been implemented and taken into account when constructing missile defense systems, however, it does not guarantee their effectiveness or success. The US Missile Defense Agency has received scrutiny in regards to their lack of foresight of these countermeasures, causing many scientists to perform various studies and data analysis as to the true effectiveness of these countermeasures.

=== Decoys ===
A common countermeasure that attacking parties use to disrupt the efficacy of Missile Defense Systems are the simultaneous launching of decoys from the primary launch site or from the exterior of the main attacking missile itself. These decoys are usually small, lightweight dud rockets that take advantage of the interceptor sensors tracking and fool it by making many different targets available in an instant. This is accomplished via the releasing of decoys in certain phases of flight. Because objects of differing weights follow the same trajectory when in space, decoys released during the midcourse phase can prevent interceptor missiles from accurately identifying the warhead. This could force the defense system to attempt to destroy all incoming projectiles, which masks the true attacking missile and lets it slip by the defense system.

==== Common types of decoys ====
Since there can be many forms of this type of deception of a missile system, different categorizations of decoys have developed, all of which operate and are designed slightly different. Details of these types of decoys and their effectiveness were provided in a report by a variety of prominent scientists in 2000.

===== Replica decoys =====
This categorization of decoy is the most similar to the standard understanding of what a missile decoy is. These types of decoys attempt to mask the attacking ICBM via the release of many similar missiles. This type of decoy confuses the missile defense system by the sudden replication and the sheer amount that the defense has to deal with. Knowing that no defense system is 100% reliable, this confusion within the targeting of the defense system would cause the system to target each decoy with equal priority and as if it was the actual warhead, allowing the real warhead's chance of passing through the system and striking the target to increase drastically.

===== Decoys using signature diversity =====
Similar to replica decoys, these types of decoys also take advantage of the limitations in number within the missile defense systems targeting. However, rather than using missiles of similar build and trace to the attacking warhead, these types of decoys all have slightly different appearances from both each other and the warhead itself. This creates a different kind of confusion within the system; rather than creating a situation where each decoy (and the warhead itself) appears the same and is therefore targeted and treated exactly like the "real" warhead, the targeting system simply does not know what is the real threat and what is a decoy due to the mass amount of differing information. This creates a similar situation as the result of the replica decoy, increasing the chance that the real warhead passes through the system and strikes the target.

===== Decoys using antisimulation =====
This type of decoy is perhaps the most difficult and subversive for a missile defense system to determine. Instead of taking advantage of the missile defense system's targeting, this type of decoy intends to fool the operation of the system itself. Rather than using sheer quantity to overrun the targeting system, an anti-simulation decoy disguises the actual warhead as a decoy, and a decoy as the actual warhead. This system of "anti-simulation" allows the attacking warhead to, in some cases, take advantage of the "bulk-filtering" of certain missile defense systems, in which objects with characteristics of the warhead poorly matching those expected by the defense are either not observed because of sensor filters, or observed very briefly and immediately rejected without the need for a detailed examination. The actual warhead may simply pass by undetected, or rejected as a threat.

=== Cooled shrouds ===
Another common countermeasure used to fool missile defense systems are the implementation of cooled shrouds surrounding attacking missiles. This method covers the entire missile in a steel containment filled with liquid oxygen, nitrogen, or other coolants that prevent the missile from being easily detected. Because many missile defense systems use infrared sensors to detect the heat traces of incoming missiles, this capsule of extremely cold liquid either renders the incoming missile entirely invisible to detection or reduces the system's ability to detect the incoming missile fast enough.

=== Other types of infrared stealth ===
Another commonly applied countermeasure to missile defense is the application of various low-emissivity coatings. Similar to cooled shrouds, these warheads are fully coated with infrared reflective or resistant coatings that allow similar resistance to infrared detection that cooled shrouds do. Because the most effective coating discovered so far is gold, though, this method is often overstepped by cooled shrouds.

=== Biological and chemical weapons ===
This is perhaps the most extreme approach to countering missile defense systems that are designed to destroy ICBMs and other forms of nuclear weaponry. Rather than using many missiles equipped with nuclear warheads as their main weapon of attack, this idea involves the release of biological or chemical sub-munition weapons or agents from the missile shortly after the boost phase of the attacking ICBM. Because missile defense systems are designed with intent to destroy main attacking missiles or ICBMs, this system of sub-munition attack is too numerous for the system to defend against while also distributing the chemical or biological agent across a large area of attack. There is currently no proposed countermeasure to this type of attack except through diplomacy and the effective banning of biological weaponry and chemical agents within war. However, this does not guarantee that this countermeasure to missile defense system will not be abused via extremists or terrorists. An example of this severe threat can be further seen in North Korea's testing of anthrax tipped ICBMs in 2017.

=== Dynamic trajectories ===
Countries including Iran and North Korea may have sought missiles that can maneuver and vary their trajectories in order to evade missile defense systems.

In March 2022, when Russia claimed to have used a hypersonic missile against Ukraine, Joe Biden characterized the weapon as "almost impossible to stop". Boost-glide hypersonic weapons represent an advancement over traditional ballistic missiles in their ability to maneuver and alter their trajectory to evade current missile-defense systems. However contrary to Russian claims, the missile in question, the Kh-47M2 Kinzhal is in fact an air-launched variant of a standard ballistic missile, not a true hypersonic weapon. The missile was also later repeatedly intercepted by the Ukrainian military using the MIM-104 Patriot systems it received as military aid.

Glide Phase Interceptor (GPI) and Advanced Defence — Anti-Hypersonic (AD-AH) will provide defense against true maneuvering hypersonic weapons.

==== Multiple independently targetable re-entry vehicles ====
Another way to counter an ABM system is to attach multiple warheads that break apart upon reentry. If the ABM is able to counter one or two of the warheads via detonation or collision the others would slip through radar either because of limitations on ABM firing speeds or because of radar blackout caused by plasma interference. The first MRV was the Polaris A-3 which had three warheads and was launched from a submarine. Before regulations on how many warheads could be stored in a MIRV, the Soviets had up to twenty to thirty attached to ICBMs.

=== Jammers ===
Jammers use radar noise to saturate the incoming signals to the point where the radar cannot discern meaningful data about a target's location with meaningless noise. They can also imitate the signal of a missile to create a fake target. They are usually spread over planned missile paths to enemy territory to give the missile a clear path to their target. Because these jammers take relatively little electricity and hardware to operate, they are usually small, self-contained, and easily dispersible.

== Command and control ==
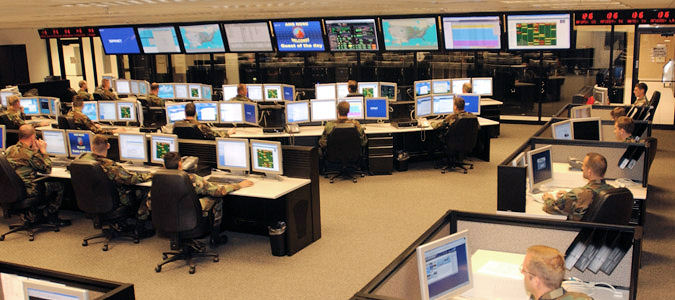
127th Command and Control Squadron – Distributed Common Ground System

=== Command and control, battle management, and communications (C2BMC) ===
Command and control, battle management, and communications (C2BMC) systems are hardware and software interfaces that integrate a multitude of sensory information at a centralized center for the ballistic missile defense system (BMDS). The command center allows for human management in accordance to the incorporated sensory information- BMDS status, system coverage, and ballistic missile attacks. The interface system helps build an image of the battle scenario or situation which enables the user to select the optimal firing solutions.

Seal of the United States Strategic Command

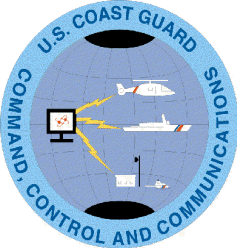
USCG Command Control and Communications

The first C2BMC system became operational in 2004. Since then, many elements have been added to update the C2BMC, which act to provide further sensory information and allow for enhanced communications between combatant commanders. A C2BMC is even capable of initiating live planning system before any engagement has even started.

=== GMD fire control and communication ===
The function of ground-based midcourse defense (GMD) systems is to provide combatants the ability to seek and destroy intermediate- and long-range ballistic missiles en route to the US homeland. Data are transmitted from the defense satellite communication system, and compiles an image using the coordinated information. The system is able to relay real-time data once missiles have been launched. The GMD can also work to receive information from the C2BMC, which allows Aegis SPY-1, and TPY-2 to contribute to the defense system.

A problem with GMD is that the ground systems have increasingly become obsolete as the technology was initially installed as early as the 1990s. So, the ground sensors had been replaced sometime in 2018. The update was to add the capability of handling up to 44 systems; it would also reduce overlapping redundancies and inefficiencies.

Missiles are a link that connects communication between land, air, and sea forces to support joint operations and improve operability. The system is intended to improve the interoperability for joint operations of NATO and coalition forces. Link-16 is also used by the US Army and Navy for air and sea operations. An important feature of Link-16 is its ability to broadcast information simultaneously to as many users as needed. Another feature of Link-16 is its ability to act as nodes, which allows for a multitude of distributed forces to operate cohesively.

The newest generation of Link-16 is the multifunctional information distribution system low-volume terminal (MIDS LVT). It is a much smaller unit that can be fitted on air, ground, and sea units to incorporate data. The MIDS LVT terminals are installed on most bombers, aircraft, UAVs, and tankers, allowing for the incorporation of most air defense systems.

=== Integrated Air and Missile Defense Battle Command System ===
The Integrated Air and Missile Defense Battle Command System (IBCS) is an unified command and control network developed by the US Army. It is designed to integrate data relay between weapon launchers, radars, and the operators, which allows air-defense units to fire interceptors with information being relayed among radars. The advantage of such a system is it can increase the area an air unit can defend and reduce interceptor spending by ensuring than no other air defense unit would engage the same target. The IBCS will be able to integrate with air defense networks of foreign military as the global C2BMC system.

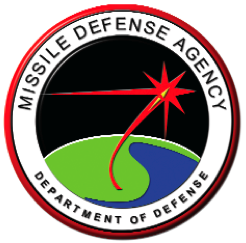
Missile Defense Agency logo

IBCS engagement stations will integrate raw data from multiple sensors and process it into a single air picture, and choose elect different weapons and launcher locations depending on the detected threat instead of being limited to particular unit capabilities.

The IBCS system is intended to be operational in 2019; between 2016 and 2017, implementation of IBCS had to be put on hold due to software issues with the system. In 2021, F-35 sensor data were linked via airborne gateway to ground-based IBCS, to conduct a simulated Army fires exercise, for future Joint All-Domain Command and Control (JADC2).

== History ==
The problem was first studied during the last year of the Second World War. The only countermeasure against the V-2 missile that could be devised was a massive barrage of anti-aircraft guns. Even if the missile's trajectory were accurately calculated, the guns would still have a small probability of destroying it before impact with the ground. Also, the shells fired by the guns would have caused more damage than the actual missile when they fell back to the ground. Plans for an operational test began anyway, but the idea was rendered moot when the V-2 launching sites in the Netherlands were captured.

In the 1950s and 1960s, missile defense meant defense against strategic (usually nuclear-armed) missiles. The technology mostly centered around detecting offensive launch events and tracking inbound ballistic missiles, but with limited ability to actually defend against the missile. The Soviet Union achieved the first nonnuclear intercept of a ballistic missile warhead by a missile at the Sary Shagan antiballistic missile defense test range on 4 March 1961. Nicknamed the "Griffon" missile system, it would be installed around Leningrad as a test.

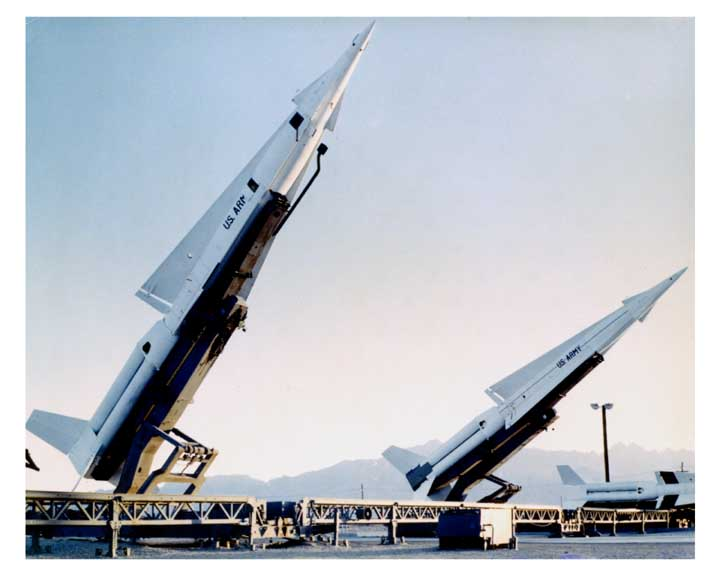
Nike Hercules missiles

Throughout the 1950s and 1960s, the United States Project Nike air defense program focused initially on targeting hostile bombers before shifting focus to targeting ballistic missiles. In the 1950s, the first United States anti-ballistic missile system was the Nike Hercules, which had the ability to intercept incoming short-range ballistic missiles, but not intermediate-range ballistic missiles (IRBMs) or ICBMs. This was followed by the Nike Zeus, which was capable of intercepting ICBMs by using a nuclear warhead, upgraded radar systems, faster computers, and control systems that were more effective in the upper atmosphere. However, it was feared the missile's electronics may be vulnerable to x-rays from a nuclear detonation in space. A program was started to devise methods of hardening weapons from radiation damage. By the early 1960s the Nike Zeus was the first anti-ballistic missile to achieve hit-to-kill (physically colliding with the incoming warhead).

In 1963, Secretary of Defense Robert McNamara diverted funds from the Zeus missile program, and instead directed that funding to the development of the Nike-X system, which used the high-speed, short-range Sprint missile. These missiles were meant to intercept incoming warheads after they had descended from space and were only seconds from their targets. To accomplish this, Nike-X required advances in missile design to make the Sprint missile quick enough to intercept incoming warheads in time. The system also included advanced active electronically scanned array radar systems and a powerful computer complex.

During the development of Nike-X, controversy over the effectiveness of anti-ballistic missile systems became more prominent. Critiques of the Nike-X included an estimate that the anti-ballistic missile system could be defeated by Soviets manufacturing more ICBMs, and the cost of those additional ICBMs needed to defeat Nike-X would also cost less than what the United States would spend on implementing Nike-X. Additionally, McNamara reported that a ballistic missile system would save American lives at the cost of approximately $700 per life, compared to a shelter system that could save lives at a lower cost of approximately $40 per life. As a result of these estimations, McNamara opposed implementation of Nike-X due to the high costs associated with construction and perceived poor cost-effectiveness of the system, and instead expressed support for pursuing arms limitations agreements with the Soviets. After the Chinese government detonated their first hydrogen bomb during Test No. 6. in 1967, McNamara modified the Nike-X program into a program called Sentinel. This program's goal was to protect major US cities from a limited ICBM attack, especially on one from China. This would be done by building fifteen sites across the continental US, and one site in each of Alaska and Hawaii. This in turn reduced tensions with the Soviet Union, which retained the offensive capability to overwhelm any US defense. McNamara favored this approach as deploying the Sentinel program was less costly than a fully implemented Nike-X program, and would reduce congressional pressures to implement an ABM system. In the months following the announcements regarding the Sentinel program, Secretary of Defense Robert McNamara stated: "Let me emphasize—and I cannot do so too strongly—that our decision to go ahead with a limited ABM deployment in no way indicates that we feel an agreement with the Soviet Union on the limitation of strategic nuclear offensive and defensive forces is in any way less urgent or desirable.

With the conclusion of the Cuban Missile Crisis and the withdrawal of Soviet missiles from their strategic positions in Cuba, the USSR started to think about a missile defense systems. A year after the crisis in 1963 the Soviets created the SA-5. Unlike its predecessors like the SA-1 or Griffon systems, this system was able to fly much higher and further and was fast enough to intercept some missiles however its main purpose was to intercept the new XB-70 supersonic aircraft the US was planning to make. However, since these types of aircraft never went into production in the US, the project was abandoned, and the Soviets reverted to the slower, low altitude SA-2 and SA-3 systems. In 1964 the Soviets publicly unveiled their newest interceptor missile named the "Galosh" which was nuclear armed and was meant for high altitude, long range interception. The Soviet Union began installing the A-35 anti-ballistic missile system around Moscow in 1965 using these "Galosh" missiles and would become operational by 1971. It consisted of four complex around Moscow each with 16 launchers and two missile tracking radars. Another notable feature of the A-35 was that it was the first monopulse radar. Developed by OKB 30, the Russian Special Design Bureau, the effort design to create a monopulse radar started in 1954. This was used to conduct the first successful intercept in 1961. There were known flaws with the design such as an inability to defend against MIRV and decoy style weapons.The reason for this was because the detonation of a nuclear interceptor missile like the "Galosh" creates a cloud of plasma that temporarily impairs radar readings around the area of the explosion limiting these kinds of systems to a one-shot capacity. This means that with MIRV style attacks the interceptor would be able to take out one or two but the rest would slip though. Another issue with the 1965 model was that it consisted of 11 large radar stations at six locations on the borders of Russia. These bases were visible to the US and could be taken out easily, leaving the defense system useless in a concentrated and coordinated attack. Finally, the missiles that could be held on each base was limited by the ABM treaty to only 100 launchers maximum, meaning that in a massive attack they would be depleted quickly. During installation, a Ministry of Defense commission concluded that the system should not be fully implemented, reducing the capabilities of the completed system. That system was later upgraded to the A-135 anti-ballistic missile system and is still operational. This upgrade period started in 1975 and was headed by Dr. A.G. Basistov. When it was completed in 1990, the new A-135 system had a central control multifunctional radar called the "Don" and 100 interceptor missiles. Another improvement was the layering of interceptor missiles where high acceleration missiles are being added for low flying targets and the "Galosh" style missiles where improved further for high altitude targets. All of these missiles where moved underground into silos to make them less vulnerable, which was a flaw of the previous system.

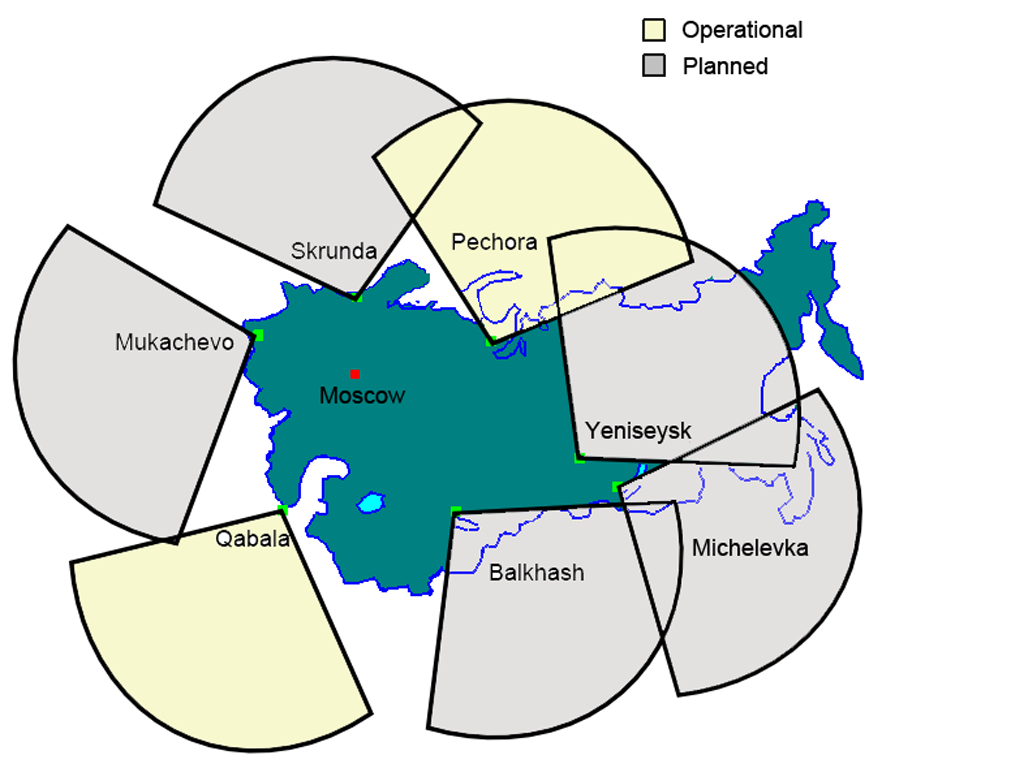
As part of the Anti-Ballistic Missile Treaty in 1972, all radars for detecting missiles were placed on the edges of the territory and faced outward.

The SALT I talks began in 1969 between the Nixon administration and the Soviet Union, and led to the Anti-Ballistic Missile Treaty in 1972. This treaty ultimately limited the US and USSR to one defensive missile site each, with no more than 100 anti-ballistic missiles and their launchers per site. The purpose of the treaty was slow down the nuclear arms race and reduce pressure to build more nuclear weapons. The treaty was intended to be followed by offensive arms limitations.

As a result of the treaty and of technical limitations, along with public opposition to nearby nuclear-armed defensive missiles, the US Sentinel program was re-designated the Safeguard Program, with the new goal of defending US ICBM sites, not cities. The US Safeguard system was planned to be implemented in various sites across the US, including at Whiteman AFB in Missouri, Malmstrom AFB in Montana, and Grand Forks AFB in North Dakota. The Anti-Ballistic Missile Treaty of 1972 placed a limit of two ABM systems within the US, causing the work site in Missouri to be abandoned, and the partially-completed Montana site was abandoned in 1974 after an additional agreement between the US and USSR that limited each country to one ABM system. As a result, the only Safeguard system that was deployed was to defend the LGM-30 Minuteman ICBMs near Grand Forks, North Dakota. However, it was deactivated in 1976 after being operational for less than four months due to a changing political climate plus concern over limited effectiveness, low strategic value, and high operational cost.

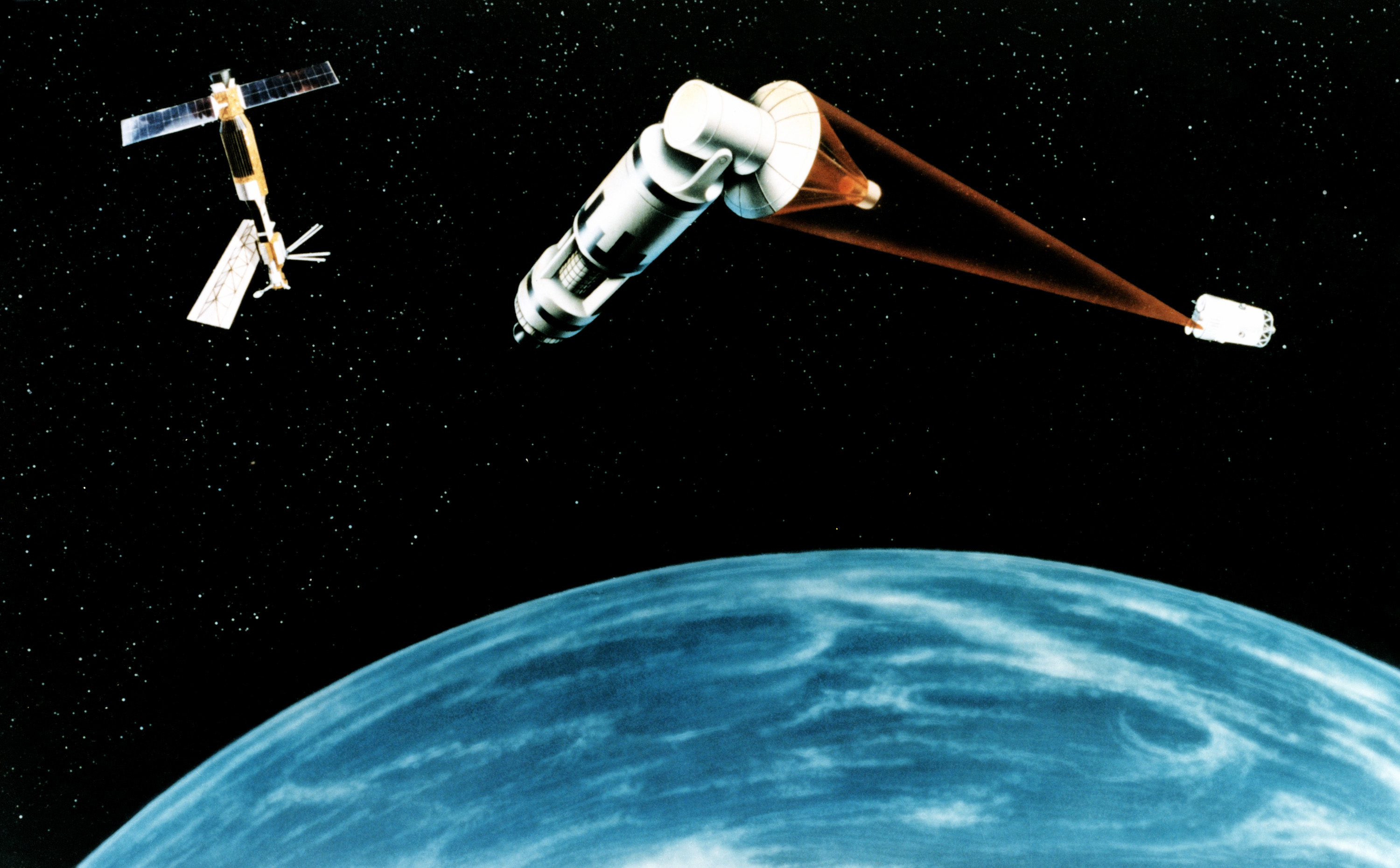
An artist's concept of a Space Laser Satellite Defense System as a part of the Strategic Defense Initiative

In the early 1980s, technology had matured to consider space based missile defense options. Precision hit-to-kill systems more reliable than the early Nike Zeus were thought possible. With these improvements, the Reagan administration promoted the Strategic Defense Initiative, an ambitious plan to provide a comprehensive defense against an all-out ICBM attack. In pursuit of that goal, the Strategic Defense Initiative investigated a variety of potential missile-defense systems, which included systems using ground-based missile systems and space-based missile systems, as well as systems using lasers or particle beam weapons. This program faced controversy over the feasibility of the projects it pursued, as well as the substantial amount of funding and time required for the research to develop the requisite technology. The Strategic Defense Initiative earned the nickname "Star Wars" due to criticism from Senator Ted Kennedy in which he described the Strategic Defense Initiative as "reckless Star Wars schemes.". Reagan established the Strategic Defense Initiative Organization (SDIO) to oversee the development of the program's projects. Upon request by the SDIO, the American Physical Society (APS) performed a review of the concepts being developed within SDIO and concluded that all of the concepts pursuing use of Directed Energy Weapons were not feasible solutions for an anti-missile defense system without decades of additional research and development. Following the APS's report in 1986, the SDIO switched focus to a concept called the Strategic Defense System, which would use a system of space-based missiles called Space Rocks which would intercept incoming ballistic missiles from orbit, and would be supplemented by ground-based missile defense systems. In 1993, the SDIO was closed and the Ballistic Missile Defense Organization (BMDO) was created, which focuses on ground-based missile defense systems using interceptor missiles. In 2002, BMDO's name was changed to its current title, the Missile Defense Agency (MDA). See National Missile Defense for additional details. In the early 1990s, missile defense expanded to include tactical missile defense, as seen in the first Gulf War. Although not designed from the outset to intercept tactical missiles, upgrades gave the Patriot system a limited missile defense capability. The effectiveness of the Patriot system in disabling or destroying incoming Scuds was the subject of congressional hearings and reports in 1992.

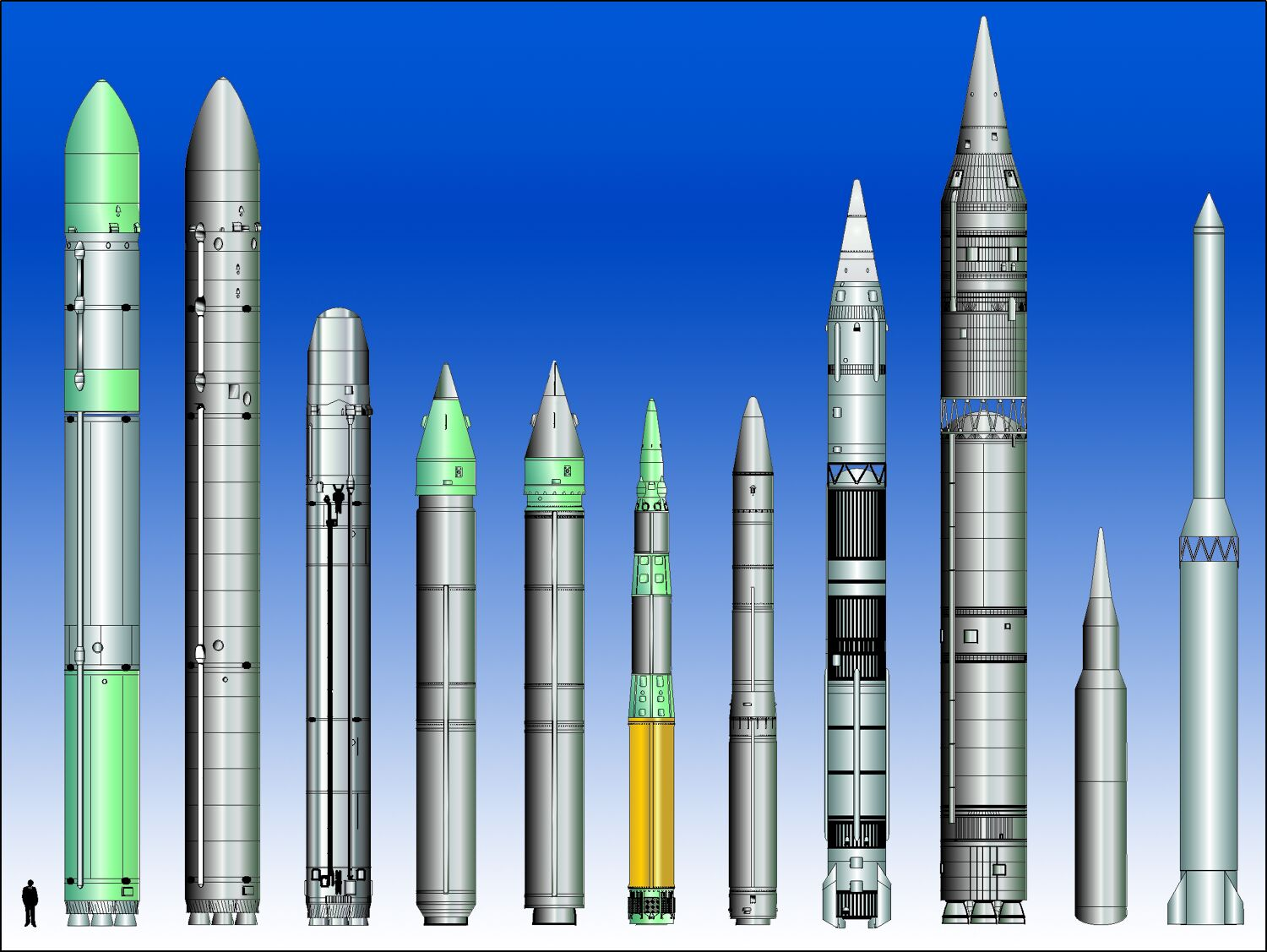
Various ICBMs used by varying countries

In the time following the agreement of the 1972 Anti-Ballistic Missile Treaty, it was becoming increasingly more and more difficult for the United States to create a new missile defense strategy without violating the terms of the treaty. During the Clinton administration, the initial goal the United States had interest in, was to negotiate with the former Soviet Union, which is now Russia, and hopefully agree to a revision to the treaty signed a few decades prior. In the late 1990s the United States had interest in an idea termed NMD or National Missile Defense. This idea essentially would allow the United States to increase the number of ballistic missile interceptors that would be available to missile defense personnel at the Alaska location. While the initial ABM treaty was designed primarily to deter the Soviet Union and help create a period of détente, the United States was primarily fearing other threats such as Iraq, North Korea, and Iran. The Russian government was not interested in making any sort of modification to the ABM treaty that would allow for technology to be developed that was explicitly banned when the treaty was agreed upon. However, Russia was interested in revising the treaty in such a way that would allow for a more diplomatic approach to potential missile harboring countries. During this period, the United States was also seeking assistance for their ballistic missile defense systems from Japan. Following the testing of the Taepo Dong missile by the North Korean government, the Japanese government became more concerned and inclined to accept a partnership for a BMD system with the United States. In late 1998, Japan and the United States agreed to the Naval Wide Theater system which would allow the two sides to design, construct, and test ballistic missile defense systems together. Nearing the end of Clinton's time in office, it had been determined that the NMD program was not as effective as the United States would have liked, and the decision was made to not employ this system while Clinton served out the rest of his term. The decision on future of the NMD program was going to be given to the next president in line, who ultimately would end up being George W. Bush.

In the late 1990s and early 2000s, the issue of defense against cruise missiles became more prominent with the new Bush administration. In 2002, President George W. Bush withdrew the US from the Anti-Ballistic Missile Treaty, allowing further development and testing of ABMs under the Missile Defense Agency, as well as deployment of interceptor vehicles beyond the single site allowed under the treaty. During the Bush's time in office, the potentially threatening countries to the United States included North Korea as well as Iran. While these countries might not have possessed the weaponry that many countries containing missile defense systems had, the Bush administration expected an Iranian missile test within the next ten years. In order to counter the potential risk of North Korean missiles, the United States Department of Defense desired to create missile defense systems along the west coast of the United States, namely in both California and Alaska.

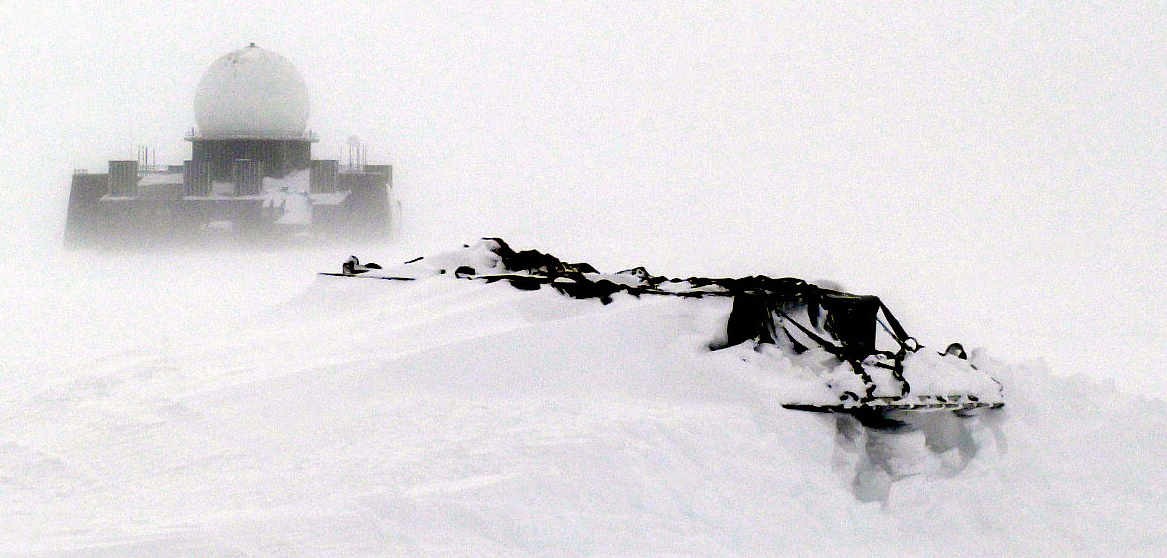
A NORAD Distant Early Warning Line (DEW) station in western Greenland is visible in the distance beyond the snow-drifted equipment pallets in the foreground of this photograph. The DEW Line was designed to track inbound ballistic missiles.

There are still technological hurdles to an effective defense against ballistic missile attack. The United States National Ballistic Missile Defense System has come under scrutiny about its technological feasibility. Intercepting midcourse (rather than launch or reentry stage) ballistic missiles traveling at several miles per second with a "kinetic kill vehicle" has been characterized as trying to hit a bullet with a bullet. Despite this difficulty, there have been several successful test intercepts and the system was made operational in 2006, while tests and system upgrades continue. Moreover, the warheads or payloads of ballistic missiles can be concealed by a number of different types of decoys. Sensors that track and target warheads aboard the kinetic kill vehicle may have trouble distinguishing the "real" warhead from the decoys, but several tests that have included decoys were successful. Nira Schwartz's and Theodore Postol's criticisms about the technical feasibility of these sensors have led to a continuing investigation of research misconduct and fraud at the Massachusetts Institute of Technology.

In February 2007, the US missile defense system consisted of 13 ground-based interceptors (GBIs) at Fort Greely, Alaska, plus two interceptors at Vandenberg Air Force Base, California. The US planned to have 21 interceptor missiles by the end of 2007. The system was initially called National Missile Defense (NMD), but in 2003 the ground-based component was renamed Ground-Based Midcourse Defense (GMD). As of 2014, the Missile Defense Agency had 30 operational GBIs, with a total 44 GBIs in the missile fields in 2018. In 2021 an additional 20 GBIs of 64 total were planned, but not yet fielded. They are tasked with meeting more complex threats than those met by the EKV.

Defending against cruise missiles is similar to defending against hostile, low-flying crewed aircraft. As with aircraft defense, countermeasures such as chaff, flares, and low altitude can complicate targeting and missile interception. High-flying radar aircraft such as AWACS can often identify low flying threats by using doppler radar. Another possible method is using specialized satellites to track these targets. By coupling a target's kinetic inputs with infrared and radar signatures it may be possible to overcome the countermeasures.

In March 2008, the US Congress convened hearings to re-examine the status of missile defense in US military strategy. Upon taking office, President Obama directed a comprehensive review of ballistic missile defense policy and programs. The review's findings related to Europe were announced on 17 September 2009. The Ballistic Missile Defense Review (BMDR) Report was published in February 2010.

== NATO missile defense system ==
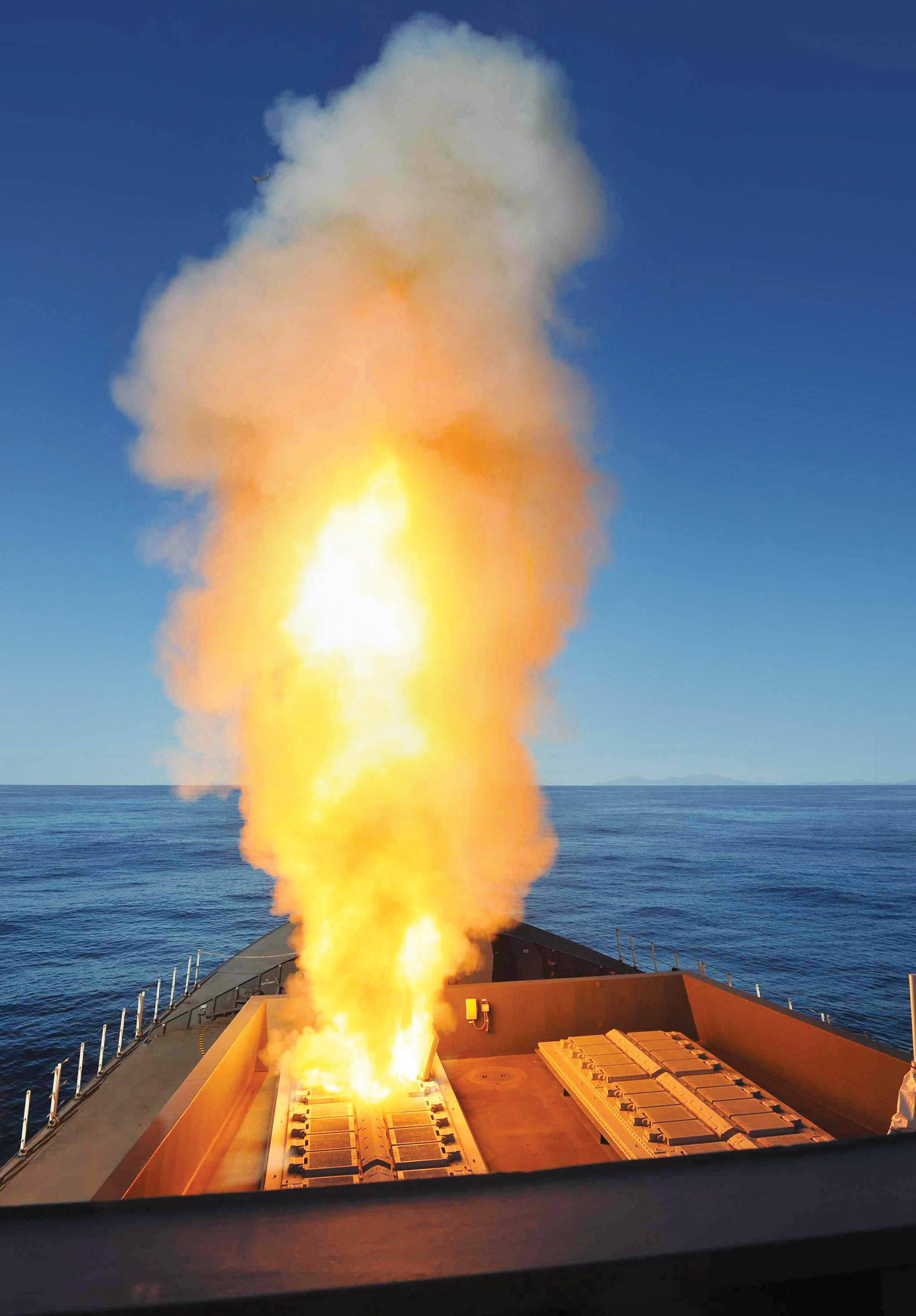
In 2012, HMS Diamond fired an Aster missile for the first time.

=== Mechanisms ===
The Conference of National Armaments Directors (CNAD) is the senior NATO committee which acts as the tasking authority for the theater missile defense program. The ALTBMD Program Management Organization, which comprises a steering committee and a program office hosted by the NATO C3 Agency, directs the program and reports to the CNAD. The focal point for consultation on full-scale missile defense is the Reinforced Executive Working Group. The CNAD is responsible for conducting technical studies and reporting the outcome to the Group. The NRC Ad hoc Working Group on TMD is the steering body for NATO-Russia cooperation on theater missile defense.

In September 2018, a consortium of 23 NATO nations met to collaborate on the Nimble Titan 18 integrated air and missile defense (IAMD) campaign of experimentation.

=== Missile defense ===
By early 2010, NATO will have an initial capability to protect Alliance forces against missile threats and is examining options for protecting territory and populations. This is in response to the proliferation of weapons of mass destruction and their delivery systems, including missiles of all ranges. NATO is conducting three missile defense–related activities:

==== Active Layered Theater Ballistic Missile Defense System capability ====
Active Layered Theater Ballistic Missile Defense System is "ALTBMD" for short.

As of 2010, the Alliance has an interim capability to protect troops in a specific area against short-range and medium-range ballistic missiles (up to 3,000 kilometers).

The end system consists of a multi-layered system of systems, comprising low- and high-altitude defenses (also called lower- and upper-layer defenses), including Battle Management Command, Control, Communications and Intelligence (BMC3I), early warning sensors, radar, and various interceptors. NATO member countries provide the sensors and weapon systems, while NATO has developed the BMC3I segment and facilitate the integration of all these elements.

==== Missile Defense for the protection of NATO territory ====
A Missile Defense Feasibility Study was launched after NATO's 2002 Prague summit. The NATO Consultation, Command and Control Agency (NC3A) and NATO's Conference of National Armaments Directors (CNAD) were also involved in negotiations. The study concluded that missile defense is technically feasible, and it provided a technical basis for ongoing political and military discussions regarding the desirability of a NATO missile defense system.

During the 2008 Bucharest summit, the alliance discussed the technical details as well as the political and military implications of the proposed elements of the US missile defense system in Europe. Allied leaders recognized that the planned deployment of European-based US missile defense assets would help protect North American Allies, and agreed that this capability should be an integral part of any future NATO-wide missile defense architecture. However, these opinions are in the process of being reconstructed given the Obama administration's decision in 2009 to replace the long-range interceptor project in Poland with a short/medium range interceptor.

Russian Foreign Minister Sergei Lavrov has stated that NATO's pattern of deployment of Patriot missiles indicates that these will be used to defend against Iranian missiles in addition to the stated goal of defending against spillover from the Syrian civil war.

==== Aegis-based system ====
In order to accelerate the deployment of a missile shield over Europe, Barack Obama sent ships with the Aegis Ballistic Missile Defense System to European waters, including the Black Sea as needed.

It was said that in 2012 the system would achieve an "interim capability" that would for the first time offer American forces in Europe some protection against IRBM attack. However, these interceptors may be poorly placed and of the wrong type to defend the United States, in addition to American troops and facilities in Europe.

The Aegis ballistic missile defense-equipped SM-3 Block II-A missile demonstrated it can shoot down an ICBM target on 16 Nov 2020.

==== ACCS Theater Missile Defense 1 ====
According to BioPrepWatch, NATO has signed a 136 million euro contract with ThalesRaytheonSystems to upgrade its current theater missile defense program.

The project, called ACCS Theater Missile Defense 1, will bring new capabilities to NATO's Air Command and Control System, including updates for processing ballistic missile tracks, additional satellite and radar feeds, improvements to data communication and correlation features. The upgrade to its theater missile defense command and control system will allow for NATO to connect national sensors and interceptors in defense against short and medium-range ballistic missiles. According to NATO's Assistant Secretary General for Defense Investment Patrick Auroy, the execution of this contract will be a major technical milestone forward for NATO's theater missile defense. The project was expected to be complete by 2015. An integrated air and missile defense (IAMD) capability will be delivered to the operational community by 2016, by which time NATO will have a true theater missile defense.

== Defense systems and initiatives ==
- Akash missile surface-to-air missile defense system
- Arrow missile
- Chū-SAM (中SAM) Japan's JGSDF Medium-Range Surface-to-Air Missile
- David's Sling
- HQ-9 regional air defense/anti-ballistic missile
- IAMD The SMDC is leading the United States Army's laser efforts to replace MIM-104 Patriot.
- Indian Ballistic Missile Defense Program
- Iron Dome
- Italian-French SAMP/T missile air defense system
- KS-1 regional air defense missile
- L-SAM
- Medium Extended Air Defense System (MEADS)
- Patriot surface-to-air missile system
- Hawk medium range surface-to-air missile (SAM) system
- RIM-161 Standard Missile 3
- Russian A-135 anti-ballistic missile system
- S-400 Triumf
- Skyguard chemical laser-based area defense system proposed by Northrop Grumman
- Sky Bow
- Strategic Defense Initiative ("Star Wars")
- Terminal High Altitude Area Defense (THAAD)
- Vigilant Eagle Airport surface-to-air missile protection system
- Iran Belief System 373 (Bavar-373)
- Iran Arman long-range anti-ballistic missile system
- Khordad 15

== See also ==
- Anti-satellite weapon
- Anti-ballistic missile
- Comparison of anti-ballistic missile systems

== Bibliography ==
- Evans, Nicole C. (October 2004). "Missile Defense: Winning Minds, Not Hearts" (PDF). Bulletin of the Atomic Scientists. Archived from the original (PDF) on 2 April 2015.
- Möckli, Daniel (April 2007). "US Missile Defense: A Strategic Challenge for Europe". CSS Analyses in Security Policy (12).
- Jones, Ishmael (2010). The Human Factor: Inside the CIA's Dysfunctional Intelligence Culture. New York: Encounter Books. ISBN 978-1-59403-223-3.
