= Integrated Air and Missile Defense =

US military research program

In air and missile defense (AMD), the Integrated Air-and-Missile Defense system (IAMD) is a United States Army Space and Missile Defense Command (USASMDC) research program to augment the aging surface-to-air missile defense systems and to provide the United States Army with a low-cost, but effective complement to kinetic energy solutions to take out air threats. Brigade level higher energy lasers are used in truck mounted systems called HELMTT. At lower levels, the Army needs to develop interceptors that don't cost more than small, unmanned aircraft systems. In early research they have successfully used 5-kilowatt lasers on a Stryker combat vehicle. The Mobile Expeditionary High-Energy Laser (MEHEL) was used at MFIX at Fort Sill, Oklahoma, in the first half of April, 2017.

== Air, Missile Defense ==
Split from: Army Futures Command

Air, Missile Defense (AMD): In 2022 plans for FY2023 cruise missile defense were underway.

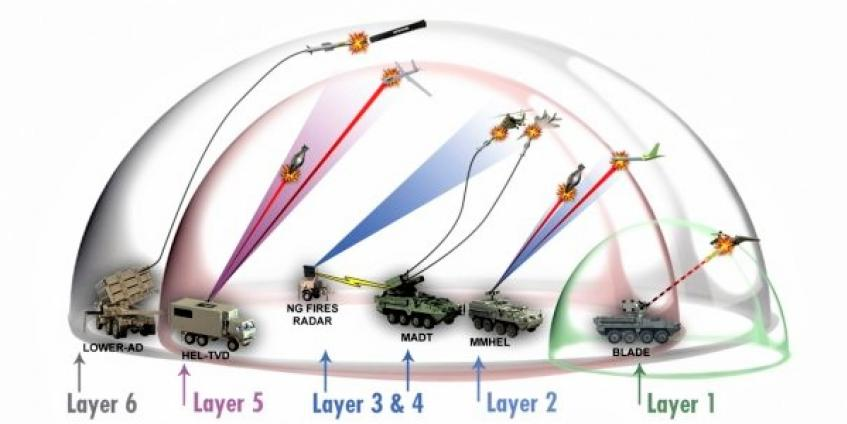
Schematic 6-layer Air Defense dome, one of multiple arrays linked by Integrated Air and Missile Battle Command System (IBCS)

=== Integrated Air and Missile Defense Battle Command System ===
The United States Army Integrated Air and Missile Defense [IAMD] Battle Command System (IBCS) is a plug and fight network intended to let any defensive sensor (such as a radar) feed its data to any available weapon system (colloquially, "connect any sensor to any shooter"). (Note: ASA(ALT) (2018) Weapon Systems Handbook update Page 32 lists how the Weapon Systems Handbook is organized. 440 pages.: By Modernization priority; By Acquisition or Business System category (ACAT or BSC). The Weapon systems in each ACAT are sorted alphabetically by Weapon system name. Each weapon system might also be in several variants (Lettered); a weapon system's variants might be severally and simultaneously in the following phases of its Life Cycle, namely—°Materiel Solution Analysis; °Technology Maturation & Risk Reduction; °Engineering & Manufacturing Development; °Production & Deployment; °Operations & Support; ACAT I, II, III, IV are defined on page 404.) The system is designed to shoot down short, medium, and intermediate range ballistic missiles in their terminal phase by intercepting with a hit-to-kill approach. IBCS has been developed since 2004, with the aim to replace Raytheon's Patriot missile (SAM) engagement control station (ECS), along with seven other forms of ABM defense command systems.

The IBCS program is part of the Army's Integrated Air and Missile Defense (IAMD) effort. IBCS aims to create an integrated network of air defense sensors, such as AN/MPQ-64 Sentinel and AN/TPS-80 G/ATOR, AN/MPQ-53, AN/MPQ-65A and LTAMDS in Patriot missile system, GhostEye MR in NASAMS, AN/TPY-2 in Terminal High Altitude Area Defense (THAAD) and Ground-Based Midcourse Defense (GMD), AN/SPY-1 and AN/SPY-6 in Aegis BMD, and AN/APG-81 in Lockeed Martin F-35 Lightning II, allowing them to interoperate with IBCS engagement control stations. IBCS engagement stations will be able to take fine control of army-fielded air-defense systems like Patriot and THAAD, directing radar positioning and suggesting recommended launchers; naval, aerial and Marine systems will only be able to share either radar tracks or raw radar data with the IBCS network. The Army requires all new missiles and air-defense systems to implement IBCS support.

Northrop Grumman was announced as the prime contractor in 2010; between 2009 and 2020, the Army had spent $2.7 billion on the program.

By May 2015, a first flight test integrated a networked S-280 engagement operations center with radar sensor and interceptor launchers. This test demonstrated a missile kill with the first interceptor. By Army doctrine, two interceptors were launched against that missile. By April 2016, IBCS tests demonstrated sensor fusion from disparate data streams, identification and tracking of targets, selection of appropriate kill vehicles, and interception of the targets, but the "IBCS software was 'neither mature nor stable'". On 1 May 2019 an Engagement Operations Center (EOC) for the Integrated Air and Missile Defense (IAMD) Battle Command System (IBCS) was delivered to the Army, at Huntsville, Alabama.

In July 2019, the TRADOC capability manager (TCM) for Strategic Missile Defense (SMD) has accepted the charter for DOTMLPF for the Space and Missile Defense Command (SMDC/ARSTRAT).

On 30 August 2019 at Reagan Test Site on Kwajalein atoll, THAAD Battery E-62 successfully intercepted a medium range ballistic missile (MRBM), using a radar which was well-separated from the interceptors; the next step tested Patriot missiles as interceptors while using THAAD radars as sensors; a THAAD radar has a longer detection range than a Patriot radar. THAAD Battery E-62 engaged the MRBM without knowledge of just when the medium range ballistic missile had launched.

IBCS' second limited user test was scheduled to take place in the fourth quarter of FY20.

In July 2020 a Limited user test (LUT) of IBCS was initiated at WSMR; the test ran until mid-September 2020. The LUT was originally scheduled for May but was delayed to handle the COVID-19 safety protocols. The first of several LUTs of IBCS, by an ADA battalion was successfully run in August 2020. IBCS successfully integrated data from two sensors (Sentinel and Patriot radars), and shot down two drones (cruise missile surrogates) with two Patriot missiles in the presence of jamming; In the week after, by 20 August 2020 two more disparate threats (cruise missile and ballistic missile) were launched and intercepted; the ADA battalion then ran hundreds of drills denoting hundreds of threats for the remainder of the IBCS tests (the increased effort occupied the entire unit); the real-world data serve as a sanity check for Monte Carlo simulations of an array of physical scenarios amounting to hundreds of thousands of cases. IBCS created a "single uninterrupted composite track of each threat" and handed off each threat for separate disposition by the air and missile defense's integrated fire control network (IFCN). The same battalion running the LUT, for both IBCS, and LTAMDS radar, is scheduled to run the Initial Operational Test & Evaluation (IOTE) in 2021, and is to run well into 2022. In 2022, IBCS successfully completed initial operational test and evaluation (IOT&E).

In September 2020 a Joint exercise against cruise missiles demonstrated AI-based kill chains which can be formulated in seconds; One of the kills was by a "M109-based" tracked howitzer (a Paladin descendant).

The ranges of the IAMD defensive radars, when operated as a system, are thousands of miles. Cross-domain information from ground, air, and space sensors was passed to a fire control system at Project Convergence 2021 (PC21), via IBCS, during one of the use case scenarios. At PC21 IBCS fused sensor data from an F-35, tracking the target, and passing that data to AFATDS (Army Field Artillery Tactical Data System). The F-35 then served as a spotter for artillery fire on ground target data. More than 100 technologies were prototyped in experiments at PC21.

By August 2020, a second Limited User Test (LUT) at White Sands Missile Range was able to detect, track, and intercept near-simultaneous low-altitude targets as well as a tactical ballistic missile, over several separate engagements. Army doctrine can now be updated to allow the launch of a single Patriot against a single target. By 2021 the Army awarded a $1.4 billion contract to Northrop Grumman for IBCS.

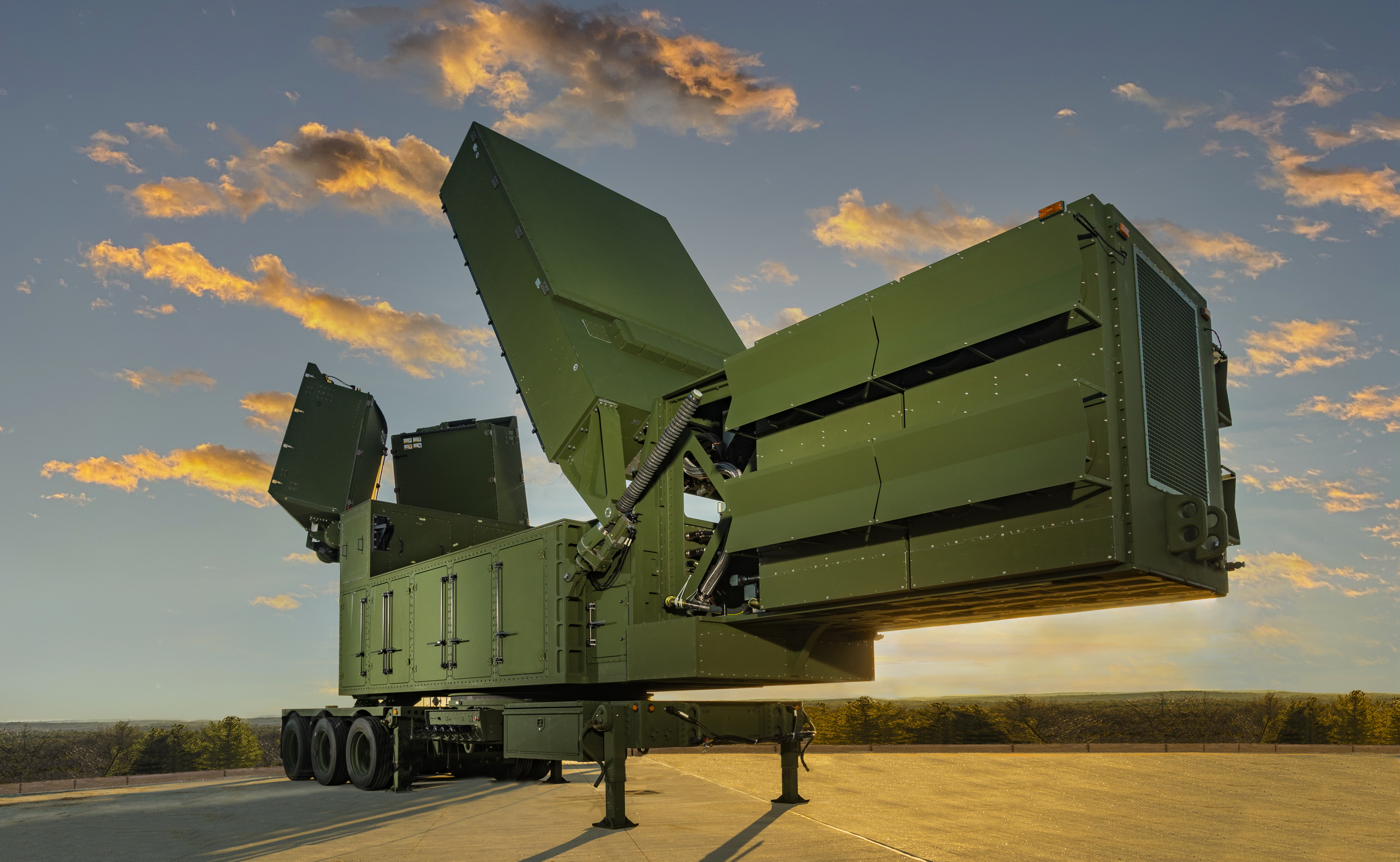
Lower Tier Air and Missile Defense Sensor

Raytheon's new Lower Tier Air and Missiles Defense Sensor (LTAMDS) radar, replaces the Patriot AN/MPQ-65A radar. LTAMDS will be able to feed raw sensor data to IBCS, and it will fit on a C-17 Globemaster. LTAMDS is engineered to operate with much greater sensitivity, improved range and ability to track smaller, faster-moving targets. It uses three fixed 120-degree arrays to seamlessly find, discriminate and track fast-approaching threats using a 360-degree protection envelope. The arrays are overlapping to close “blind spots” and maintain a track if an attacking missile shifts course in flight. LTAMDS can detect the precise shape, size, distance and speed of an approaching threat with high-fidelity sensor “pings”; its semiconductor gallium nitride (GaN) emitters allow increased resolution, accuracy, and power efficiency. (Note: Sydney J. Freedberg Jr. Army Applications Lab: (23 October 2018) Army Futures Command Wants YOU (To Innovate): —Adam Jay Harrison's list for types of Funding Authority) The fielding of four LTAMDS radars to a battalion is expected in 2023.

Although on 21 August 2019 the Missile Defense Agency (MDA) cancelled the $5.8 billion contract for the Redesigned kill vehicle (RKV), the Army's 100th Missile Defense Brigade will continue to use the Exo-Atmospheric Kill Vehicle (EKV). The current Ground-based Midcourse Defense (GMD) programs continue per plan, with 64 ground-based interceptors (GBIs) in the missile fields for 2019 planned. Command and Control Battle Management and Communications (C2BMC), was developed by the Missile defense agency (as a development organization) and is integrated with GMD, as demonstrated by FTG-11 on 25 March 2019. By March 2021, the decision to approve further development of the Next Generation Interceptor is on the agenda for the 35th Deputy Secretary of Defense Kathleen Hicks. Hicks has extensive background in defense modernization; the 28th Secretary of Defense Lloyd Austin has recused himself from acquisition matters.

On 24 February 2022 THAAD radar and TFCC (THAAD Fire Control & Communication) demonstrated their interoperability with Patriot PAC-3 MSE missiles; in other words IBCS can engage targets using both THAAD and Patriot interceptors, freed of a siloed solution (THAAD-only / Patriot-only, etc.). For example, in a scenario where a THAAD system has to conserve its All-Up-Rounds, IBCS can calculate which targets are within the reach of its PAC-3 MSE interceptors, and instead fire the PAC-3 interceptors at those targets within range.

IBCS is projected to be at its initial operating capability (IOC) in Fiscal year 2022. In January 2018 James H. Dickinson and Richard Formica broached the integration of strategic fires and air/missile defense in the multi-domain task force. (Note: In January 2018 Lt. Gen. James H. Dickinson broached the possibility of both strategic fires and air/missile defense capabilities being in the same unit.)

=== High Energy Laser Tactical Vehicle Demonstrator ===
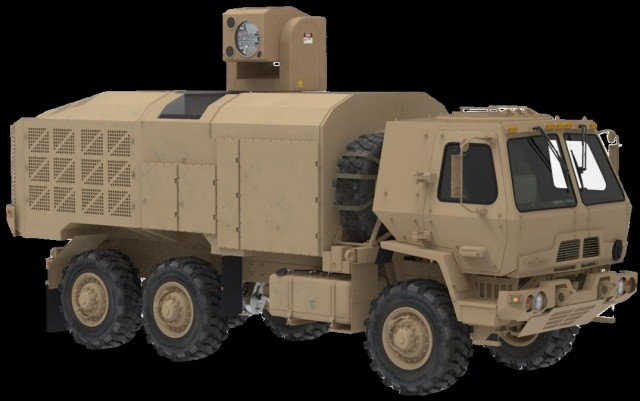
High Energy Laser Tactical Vehicle Demonstrator (HEL-TVD) 2019

A contract for the U.S. Army Space and Missile Defense Command/Army Forces Strategic Command's High Energy Laser Tactical Vehicle Demonstrator (HEL TVD) laser system, a 100 kilowatt laser demonstrator for use on the Family of Medium Tactical Vehicles, was awarded 15 May 2019 to Dynetics-Lockheed. A 300 kilowatt laser demonstrator (HEL-IFPC) effort supersedes the HEL TVD (after the critical design review). System test at White Sands Missile Range in 2023.

- Indirect fire protection capability (IFPC) Multi-mission launcher (MML) fielding 50 kW lasers on Strykers in 2021 and 2022 to two battalions per year.
- Stryker-based Maneuver short-range air defense (M-SHORAD) with laser cannon prototypes in 2020, In July 2021 RCCTO conducted a combat shootoff on just how to control pointing these high-energy lasers. Raytheon is providing the high energy laser, DE M-SHORAD, for the Strykers in 2022.
- RCCTO has awarded a contract to build a 300 kW high-energy laser (HEL) for the Army in FY2022, capable of defending against airborne threats, by acquiring, tracking, and maintaining the HEL's aimpoint on the threat until it goes down.
