= Integrated Air and Missile Defense Battle Command System =

Network in the US Army

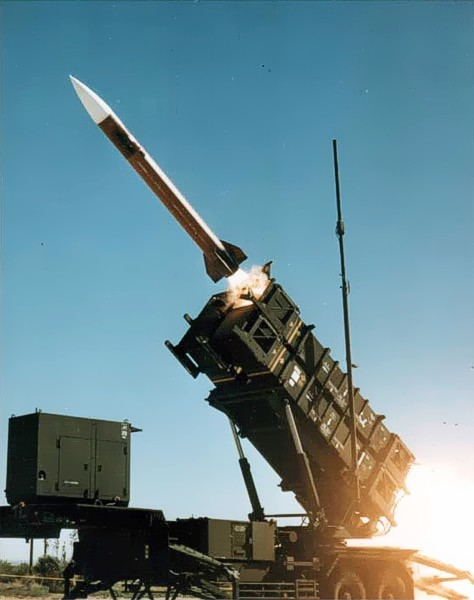
Launch of a MIM-104 Patriot missile

The United States Army Integrated Air and Missile Defense [IAMD] Battle Command System (IBCS) is a plug-and-fight network intended to let a radar or any other defensive sensor feed its data to any available weapon—colloquially, "connect any sensor to any shooter". The IBCS is designed to link radars across thousands of miles and shoot down short-, medium-, and intermediate-range ballistic missiles in their terminal phase.

IBCS was designed to replace eight anti-ballistic missile defense command systems, including Raytheon's Patriot missile engagement control station. Development began in 2004; 18 years later, IBCS completed initial operational test and evaluation (IOT&E). It was approved for full-rate production in 2023.

== Requirements ==
Part of the Army's Integrated Air and Missile Defense (IAMD) effort, IBCS aims to create an integrated network of air defense sensors that can interoperate with IBCS engagement control stations. Such sensors include AN/MPQ-64 Sentinel; AN/TPS-80 G/ATOR; AN/MPQ-53, AN/MPQ-65A and GhostEye (LTAMDS) in the Patriot missile system; GhostEye MR in NASAMS; AN/TPY-2 in Terminal High Altitude Area Defense (THAAD) and Ground-Based Midcourse Defense (GMD); AN/SPY-1 and AN/SPY-6 in Aegis BMD; and AN/APG-81 in Lockheed Martin F-35 Lightning II.

IBCS engagement stations will be able to control Army air-defense systems such as Patriot and THAAD, directing radar positioning and suggesting recommended launchers. Navy, Air Force, and Marine Corps systems will be able only to share radar tracks or raw radar data. The Army requires all new missiles and air-defense systems to support IBCS.

== History ==
In 2010, the Army picked Northrop Grumman to be the prime contractor.

In May 2015, the Army networked an S-280 engagement operations center with radar sensors and interceptor launchers for a test. Following Army doctrine, two interceptors were launched against a target missile, which was destroyed.

In April 2016, IBCS demonstrated sensor fusion from disparate data streams, identification and tracking of targets, selection of appropriate kill vehicles, and interception of the targets, but the "IBCS software was 'neither mature nor stable'".

In 2018, IBCS was projected to be at its initial operating capability in fiscal 2022. In January 2018, Lt. Gen. James H. Dickinson and Richard Formica suggested that a single unit might operate strategic fires and air/missile defense.

In May 2019, an IBCS Engagement Operations Center (EOC) was delivered to the Army in Huntsville, Alabama.

In July 2019, the TRADOC capability manager (TCM) for Strategic Missile Defense (SMD) accepted the charter for DOTMLPF for the Space and Missile Defense Command (SMDC/ARSTRAT).

In August 2019 at Reagan Test Site on Kwajalein Atoll, THAAD Battery E-62 intercepted a medium-range ballistic missile using a radar that was well-separated from the interceptors and without knowing just when it had launched. In the next test, Patriot interceptors were guided by THAAD radars, which have longer detection ranges than Patriot radars.

From July (delayed from May by the COVID-19 pandemic) to September 2020, White Sands Missile Range conducted a limited user test of IBCS. In August 2020, an air-defense battalion integrated data from two sensors (Sentinel and Patriot radars) to overcome jamming and shoot down two drones (cruise missile surrogates) with two Patriot missiles. By 20 August 2020, IBCS was used to down two disparate threats in a test: a cruise missile and ballistic missile.

The battalion then ran hundreds of drills simulating hundreds of threats, providing real-world data to check on Monte Carlo simulations of an array of physical scenarios amounting to hundreds of thousands of cases. IBCS created a "single uninterrupted composite track of each threat" and handed off each threat for separate disposition by the air and missile defense's integrated fire control network (IFCN).

The battalion used IBCS to detect, track, and intercept near-simultaneous low-altitude targets as well as a tactical ballistic missile The tests allowed Army doctrine to be updated to allow the launch of a single Patriot against a single target. As well, the battalion was tapped to run the Initial Operational Test & Evaluation (IOTE) in 2021 and 2022.

In September 2020, a joint cruise-missile-defense exercise demonstrated AI-based kill chains formulated in seconds. One of the kills was by a kinetic projectile fired by a tracked howitzer based on the M109.

From 2009 to 2020, the Army spent $2.7 billion on the program. In 2021, the Army awarded a $1.4 billion contract to Northrop Grumman for the IBCS.

At the Army's Project Convergence 2021 tech demonstration and experimentation event, IBCS was used to pass information from ground, air, and space sensors to a fire control system. IBCS passed sensor data from an F-35 to AFATDS (Army Field Artillery Tactical Data System), using the aircraft as a spotter for artillery fire. In February 2022, testers used IBCS to engage targets using various mixes of radars, interceptors, and fire control systems from the THAAD and Patriot systems. For example, in a scenario where a THAAD system has to conserve its All-Up-Rounds, IBCS can calculate which targets are within the reach of its Patriot PAC-3 MSE interceptors, and fire those instead as needed.

In April 2023, the IBCS was approved for full-rate production, after years of delays.

In March 2024, Poland signed a $2.5 billion deal for the IBCS, to be delivered between 2024 and 2031, as part of its air defense strategy. In December 2025, the country announced full operational readiness of its IBCS network, making it the first of the United States' allies to field the system.

== Raytheon GhostEye (Lower Tier Air and Missiles Defense Sensor) ==
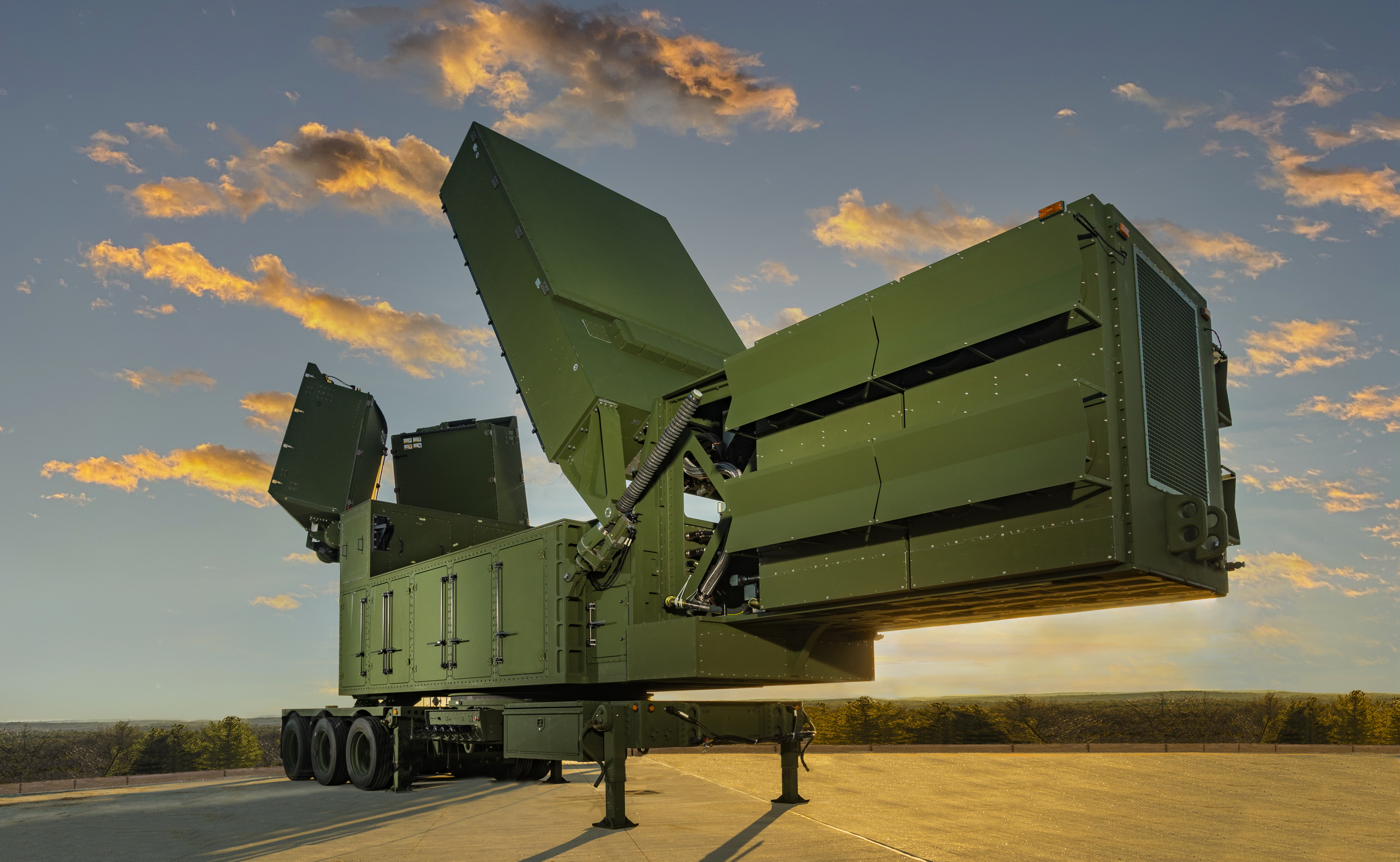
GhostEye radar

Raytheon's new GhostEye radar (previously Lower Tier Air and Missiles Defense Sensor, LTAMDS) replaces the Patriot AN/SPY-65A radar. GhostEye will be able to feed raw sensor data to IBCS, and it will fit on a C-17 Globemaster. GhostEye is engineered to operate with much greater sensitivity, improved range and ability to track smaller, faster-moving targets. It uses three fixed 120-degree arrays to seamlessly find, discriminate and track fast-approaching threats using a 360-degree protection envelope. The arrays are overlapping to close "blind spots" and maintain a track if an attacking missile shifts course in flight. GhostEye can detect the precise shape, size, distance and speed of an approaching threat with high-fidelity sensor "pings"; its semiconductor gallium nitride (GaN) emitters allow increased resolution, accuracy, and power efficiency. The fielding of four LTAMDS radars to a battalion is expected in 2023. In August 2024, the Army awarded Raytheon a $2 billion low-rate initial production contract for the LTAMDS radar through November 2028.

== The Indirect fire protection capability (IFPC) ==
The Indirect fire protection capability (IFPC) Multi-Mission Launcher (MML) will have fielded 50 kW lasers on Strykers in 2021 and 2022 to two battalions per year. In late FY2024 an integrated test of LTAMDS, IFPC, and IBCS is planned.

Although in August 2019 the Missile Defense Agency (MDA) cancelled the $5.8 billion contract for the Redesigned kill vehicle (RKV), the Army's 100th Missile Defense Brigade will continue to use the Exo-Atmospheric Kill Vehicle (EKV). The current Ground-based Midcourse Defense (GMD) programs continue per plan, with 64 ground-based interceptors (GBIs) in the missile fields for 2019 planned. Command and Control Battle Management and Communications (C2BMC), was developed by the Missile defense agency (as a development organization) and is integrated with GMD, as demonstrated by FTG-11 on 25 March 2019.

In March 2021, the decision to approve further development of the Next Generation Interceptor was on the agenda for the 35th Deputy Secretary of Defense Kathleen Hicks. Hicks has extensive background in defense modernization. The 28th Secretary of Defense Lloyd Austin has recused himself from acquisition matters.

== See also ==
- Akashteer - Indian equivalent
