= NATO Medium Extended Air Defense System Management Agency =

The NATO Medium Extended Air Defense System Management Agency (NAMEADSMA) is located in Huntsville, Alabama. The agency was founded by NATO in July 1996 to oversee the tri-national Medium Extended Air Defense System (MEADS), a joint military project intended to replace the aging MIM-104 Patriot missile system.

The United States funds 58 percent of the MEADS program, and European partners Germany and Italy provide 25 percent and 17 percent respectively. MEADS development work is allocated in accordance with national funding. Personnel from the United States, Germany, and Italy staff the agency.

As contracting authority providing management of the MEADS program on behalf of the participating nations, NAMEADSMA is responsible for managing the system acquisition. The U.S. and Italy signed the Design and Development (D&D) MOU on 24 and 27 September 2004, respectively. The NAMEADSMA awarded the MEADS D&D letter contract to MEADS International Inc. on 28 September 2004, initiating the MEADS Design and Development (D&D) phase. The MOU was amended in March 2005 by the U.S. and Italy to allow the German Parliament additional time for their signature decision, and on 22 April 2005 Germany signed the MOU. NAMEADSMA awarded a $3.4 billion D&D definitized contract to MEADS International Inc. on 31 May 2005.

MEADS is being developed in accordance with International Common Operational Requirements that call for capabilities not met by current systems. MEADS incorporates the hit-to-kill PAC-3 MSE missile in a system that includes 360-degree surveillance and fire control sensors, netted-distributed battle management/communication centers, and high-firepower launchers. The system combines superior battlefield protection with unprecedented flexibility, allowing it to protect maneuver forces and to provide homeland defense against tactical ballistic missiles, cruise missiles, unmanned aerial vehicles, and aircraft.
