= Nimble Titan =

Wargame campaign series

Nimble Titan is an Integrated Air and Missile Defense (IAMD) recurring two-year wargame campaign series that provides for national security and military policy experimentation in a notional scenario set 10 years in the future. It is the premier forum of U.S. Strategic Command for developing experimental IAMD national security and military policy among U.S. allies and partners. The experimental nature of the wargame is to stimulate participants to think outside of the constraints of current international and national norms, policies, and procedures.

Established in the 1990s, Nimble Titan was originally a U.S. Joint Staff wargame initiative to develop and test missile defense design concepts and capabilities at the tactical and operational level. In 2002, Nimble Titan became a bilateral wargame, in cooperation with the United Kingdom, that experimented with interceptor shot doctrine, automated battle management aids, decision support tools, early warning, integration and interoperability, and command and control authorities. In 2006, the Joint Staff relinquished control of Nimble Titan to U.S. Strategic Command. The wargame series expanded to include participant nations from both Western Europe and the Indo-Pacific. Multiple nations from around the world began to participate as interested observers. The focus of the wargame series evolved to investigate international and national strategic policy issues, rather than tactical and operational technical and procedural issues. Since 2006, Nimble Titan has grown in scope and scale. It now regularly hosts over 100 participants from 24 nations, NATO and other international organizations, as well as multiple nations in observer status.
