= Plug and fight =

Plug-and-fight is the military equivalent of plug and play as applied to commercial and personal computer systems. Plug-and-fight refers to the capability of certain large military systems such as the Medium Extended Air Defense System (MEADS) to automatically recognize and assemble various system elements, like sensors, weapons, and control nodes, into a single integrated supersystem or system-of-systems. Plug-and-fight systems can be rapidly reconfigured without interrupting operations – adding, removing, and rearranging system elements in response to evolving threats and changing defense strategies. The architecture of such modular systems is often described as netted-distributed. Sensors, shooters, and tactical operations centers (TOC) simply act as nodes on the network, and a military commander can dynamically add or subtract these elements as the situation dictates without shutting the system down.

Plug-and-fight system elements connect to an open wired or wireless communication network through a standardized interface, and have the ability to interact with other system elements on that network to accomplish specific combat objectives. To maximize product applicability, and to ensure the general acceptance of system developers, any plug-and-fight standardized interface should be based on protocols and standards that are widely recognized, well defined, strongly controlled, and non-proprietary. Modern examples include Ethernet, IP, TCP, CORBA, and any specific message structure that can be freely disseminated and used without licensing.

MEADS was the first system to use standardized integrated Air and Missile Defense protocols. It was designed with plug-and-fight capabilities to support data exchange with external sensors and launchers through standardized open protocols for integrated air and missile defense (IAMD), so that MEADS elements can interoperate with allied forces on the move, attaching to and detaching from the battle management network as necessary. In November 2011, MEADS system elements successfully performed a simulated engagement against real-world air and representative missile threats demonstrating plug-and-fight capabilities.

The US Army Integrated Battle Command System (IBCS) is in development since 2004. It is part of the Integrated Air and Missile Defense (IAMD) program, which aims to create an integrated network of air defense sensors and missile launchers using a suite of open standardized protocols. IBCS control stations will replace engagement control stations (ECS) in Patriot missile system, along with seven other forms of ABM defense command systems. Supported sensors will include AN/MPQ-64 Sentinel and AN/TPS-80 G/ATOR, AN/MPQ-53, AN/MPQ-65/65A and GhostEye (LTAMDS) in Patriot missile system, GhostEye MR in NASAMS, MFCR and SR in MEADS, AN/TPY-2 in Terminal High Altitude Area Defense (THAAD) and Ground-Based Midcourse Defense (GMD), AN/SPY-1 and AN/SPY-6 in Aegis BMD, and AN/APG-81 in Lockeed Martin F-35 Lightning II. This network of sensors will be controlled by IBCS engagement control stations which will be able to take fine control of army-fielded air-defense systems like Patriot and THAAD, directing radar positioning and suggesting recommended launchers, while naval, aerial and Marine systems will only be able to share either radar tracks or raw radar data with the IBCS network. The Army requires all new missiles and air-defense systems to implement IBCS support.
