= AN/TPY-2 transportable radar =

US military transportable X-band surveillance radar

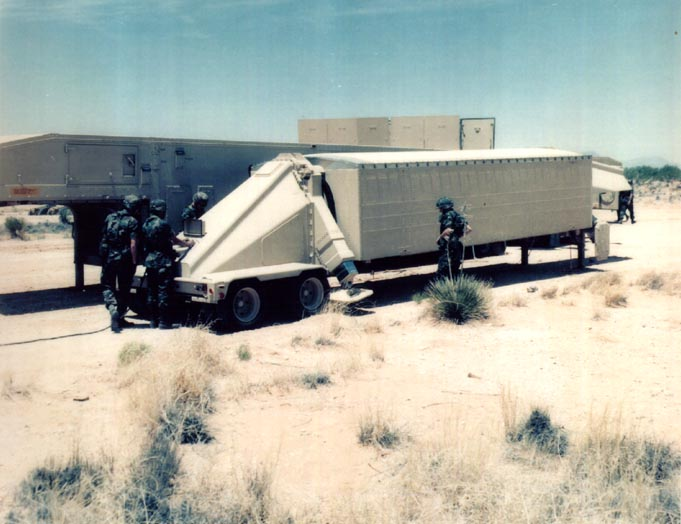
TPY-2 radar in travelling configuration

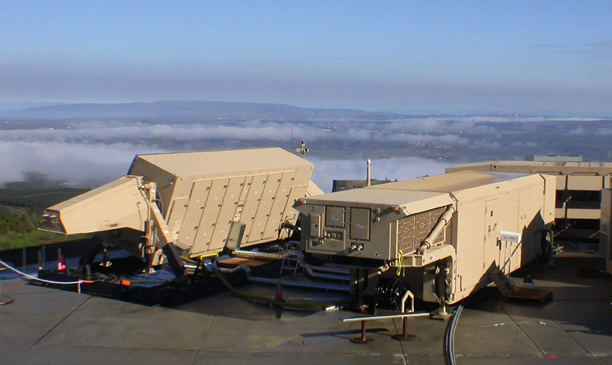
View from the back on a deployed TPY-2 radar

The AN/TPY-2 Surveillance Transportable Radar, or Forward Based X-band Transportable (FBX-T) is a long-range, very high-altitude active digital antenna array surveillance radar designed to add a tier to existing missile and air defense systems. It has a range of up to 3,000 kilometres (1,600 nmi; 1,900 mi), depending on target/mode. Manufactured by Raytheon, it is the primary radar for the Terminal High Altitude Area Defense (THAAD) missile system, but also cues the AN/MPQ-53 radar of the MIM-104 Patriot system. Patriot PAC-3 is a lower-altitude missile and air defense system than THAAD.

In accordance with the Joint Electronics Type Designation System (JETDS), the "AN/TPY-2" designation represents the second design of an Army-Navy electronic device for ground transportable surveillance radar system. The JETDS system also now is used to name all Department of Defense and some NATO electronic systems.

The TPY-2 is a missile-defense radar that can detect, classify, track, and intercept ballistic missiles. It has two operating modes; one to detect ballistic missiles as they rise, and another to guide interceptors toward a descending warhead. Once it detects the missile, it acquires, tracks, and discriminates between the warhead and non-threats such as countermeasures to destroy the missile with a hit to kill kinetic warhead.

The AN/TPY-2 is an X band active electronically scanned array radar, which operates in the 8.55–10 GHz (3.51–3.00 cm) X-band. Raytheon builds it as part of an X-band family, along with the National Missile Defense (NMD) X-Band Radar (XBR) and AN/FPS-129 HAVE STARE. X-band provides better target resolution than lower frequency bands, for example the L band, though lower frequency bands generally perform better detecting targets with a low radar cross section (RCS). The X-band frequency and narrow beam width improve differentiation, or “range resolution,” between smaller objects, such as warheads, clutter, and decoys. Once information about the threat of missile is received, determining information such as its speed and trajectory, this data is immediately passed along to ballistic missile defense system (BMDS) tracking, discrimination, and fire control radars downstream. This approach extends sensor coverage, the possibility to extend the BMDS battlespace, and the ability to complicate missiles ability to penetrate the defense system.

The U.S. Missile Defense Agency (MDA) and Raytheon planned to improve detection range and sensitivity of the X-band TPY-2 missile defense radar through the introduction of gallium nitride semiconductor components. On September 25, 2024, RTX (Raytheon) announced that completing their first TPY-2 with a full complement of GaN devices.

== Deployment ==
The U.S. Army developed the system and remains responsible for its use by air defense artillery in theater and tactical applications. As a component of national ballistic missile defense, the U.S. Missile Defense Agency is responsible for AN/TPY-2 applications.

It has been deployed in Japan to collect strategic-level information on North Korean missile developments, as well as warning Japan of incoming warheads. Also, AN/TPY-2 radar in Shariki region is able to scan Russian territory near Japan. Japan has bought both PAC-3 for point defense, and is upgrading the AEGIS systems on its Kongo-class destroyers so they can use the longer-range RIM-161 Standard Missile 3 theater ballistic missile defense.

An AN/TPY-2 is based in Alaska as part of United States national missile defense development. The U.S. has agreed to provide the system to Israel, complementing their two-tier Arrow 2 missile and Patriot PAC-3 missile defense. The TPY-2 complements the fixed AN/FPS-129 HAVE STARE X-band "large dish" radar, located at Vandenberg Space Force Base in California. Smaller mobile X-band dishes, not yet designated, may also be paired with the AN/TPY-2.

The 1st Space Brigade now supervises U.S. Army TPY-2 radar sites (batteries) in Qatar, Turkey, and Israel (13th Missile Defence Battery).

=== Losses ===
At least one radar was hit and apparently destroyed in March 2026 from a retaliation by Iran on a THAAD fire unit at the Muwaffaq Salti Air Base in Jordan. Another radar system was apparently hit at Prince Sultan Air Base in the early days of the 2026 Iran war. It was unclear if the system was owned by the U.S. or Saudi Arabia.

== See also ==
- List of radars
- List of military electronics of the United States
