= Comparison of anti-ballistic missile systems =

Defense system comparison

This is a table of the most widespread or notable anti-ballistic missile (ABM) systems, intended in whole or part, to counter ballistic missiles. Since many systems have developed in stages or have many iterations or upgrades, only the most notable versions are described. Such systems are typically highly integrated with radar and guidance systems, so the emphasis is chiefly on system capability rather than the specific missile employed. For example, David's Sling is a system that employs the Stunner missile. THAAD employs the Talon interceptor missile.

Legend for ABM system status in below table: Operational In development Inactive Unknown status

System name	Country of origin	Period of use	Intercept	Role against	Weight	Warhead types	Range (max)	Ceiling (max)	Speed	Launcher	Cost/round (2024)
A-35M/A-350 (5V61R) (Note: The original A-35 was introduced in 1972 with the A-350Zh missile. It was replaced by the A-350R in 1974, and then by A-350M in 1978.)	Soviet Union	1978–1995	Exo-atmospheric	ICBM	32,700 kg	Nuclear 2-3 MT	320–350 km	120 km	Mach 4	Fixed launcher	
A-135 ABM (51T6 Gorgon)	Russia	1995–2006	Exo-atmospheric	MRBM, ICBM	33,000–45,000 kg	Nuclear 10 KT	350–900 km		Mach 7	Silo	
A-135 ABM (53T6 Gazelle)	Russia	1995–present	Re-entry	MRBM, ICBM	10,000 kg	Nuclear 10 KT	80–100 km	80–100 km	Mach 17	Silo	
A-235 Nudol	Russia	In development	Re-entry, terminal	ICBM, ASAT		Conventional	150 km	5–80 km (ASAT 700 km)		Mobile, silo	
S-300 (V/SA-12B/9M82M) (Note: The S-300 requires specific missile models to be used in the ABM role. Most missiles are optimized for anti-aircraft use.)	Russia	1983–present	Terminal	MRBM, IRBM	5800 kg	Blast	40 km	30 km	Mach 7.8+	Mobile	$1,000,000 (48N6)
S-400 (48N6DM Triumf, 40N6, 9M96E/E2)	Russia	2007–present	Terminal	SRBM, IRBM	1800–1900 kg	Blast	80–250 km (48N6DM) 400 km (40N6), 120 km (9M96E/E2)	30 km	Mach 5.9	Mobile	
S-500	Russia	2021–present		IRBM, MRBM, ICBM, ASAT			600 km	200 km	Mach 12	Mobile	
Project 640-1	China	1966–1977	Terminal	ICBM						Silo	
HQ-9	China	2001–present	Terminal	SRBM, MRBM	1300 kg		250 km	50 km		Mobile	
HQ-22	China	2019–present	Terminal	SRBM						Mobile	
HQ-19	China	2018–present	Terminal, Mid-course	MRBM, IRBM, ICBM, ASAT		Kill Vehicle		200 km		Mobile	
HQ-26	China	In development	Mid-course	IRBM						Ship silo	
HQ-29	China	2025–present	Mid-course	IRBM, ICBM, ASAT		Kill Vehicle		500–1200 km		Mobile	
Dong Neng-3	China	In development	Mid-course	ICBM, ASAT		Kill Vehicle				Mobile	
SAMP/T (Aster 30 1N)	France Italy	2011–present	Terminal	SRBM, MRBM	450 kg	Blast	150 km	25 km	Mach 4.5	Ship silo, mobile	$2,000,000
Prithvi ADV Phase I	India	Awaiting deployment?	Exo-atmospheric	MRBM, IRBM, ICBM, ASAT		Blast	300–>1000 km	50–180 km	Mach 5		
AAD/Ashwin Phase I	India	Awaiting deloyment?	Terminal	MRBM, IRBM	1200 kg	Kill vehicle	200 km	15–50 km			
AD-1 Phase II	India	In development	Endo-exo-atmospheric	MRBM, IRBM	18,000 kg						
AD-2 Phase II	India	In development	Terminal	IRBM							
David's Sling/Stunner	Israel	2018–present	Terminal	SRBM, MRBM		Kill vehicle	250 km	15 km	Mach 7.5	Mobile	$1,000,000
Arrow 2 (Block 4) (Note: The Arrow 1 (Hetz) never went into service, as it was quickly overtaken by the smaller Arrow 2.)	Israel	2012–present	Re-entry	MRBM, IRBM	2800 kg	Blast	90 km +	Exo-atmospheric	Mach 9	Mobile	$3,500,000
Arrow 3	Israel	2017–present	Exo-atmospheric, ASAT	MRBM, IRBM, ICBM	less than 1400 kg	Kill vehicle	2400 km	100 km	Mach 9+	Mobile	$2,000,000
Arrow 4	IsraelUnited States	2021-present									
KM-SAM (Block II)	Republic of Korea	(Block II with ABM capabilities) 2017–present	Terminal	SRBM	400 kg	Kill Vehicle	50 km	20 km	Mach 4.5+	Mobile	
L-SAM (Block I)	Republic of Korea	In production	Exo-atmospheric	SRBM		Kill vehicle	150 km	40–60 km	Mach 9	Mobile	
Sky Bow III/Tien Kung III	Taiwan	2014–present	Terminal	SRBM			200 km	45 km	Mach 7	Mobile	
Strong Bow/Chiang Kung IV	Taiwan	Production 2025	Exo-atmospheric	SRBM		Blast		70 km		Mobile	
Violet Friend/Bloodhound Mk. III	United Kingdom	Canceled 1965	Terminal			Nuclear low KT	120 km	9 km+		Mobile	
Patriot (PAC-3) (Note: Patriot initially was solely an anti-aircraft missile. with no capability against ballistic missiles. The PAC-1 upgrade introduced this capability as a software upgrade. PAC-2 improved this capability, and the GEM+ upgrade introduced separate versions optimized for cruise missiles or ballistic missiles. PAC-3 is a new design, intended primarily for ABM use.)	United States	2009–present	Terminal	SRBM, MRBM	312 kg	Kill vehicle	160 km	24 km +		Mobile	$3,729,769
THAAD/Talon	United States	2008–present	Re-entry	SRBM, MRBM, IRBM	900 kg	Kill vehicle	200 km +	150 km	Mach 8.2	Mobile	$12,600,000 (2017)
Aegis RIM-174 SM-6 ERAM (Note: SM-6 is a general-purpose weapon that can be used against ballistic missiles, cruise missiles, aircraft, and surface targets.)	United States	2009–present	Terminal	MRBM, IRBM	1500 kg	Blast	240–370 km	33 km	Mach 3.5	Ship silo	$3,901,818 (IA)
Aegis RIM-161 SM-3 (IIA) (Note: SM-3 is a specialty weapon intended solely for ABM use .)	United States	2014–present	Boost (naval), mid-course	MRBM, IRBM, ICBM, ASAT	1500 kg	Kill vehicle	1200 km	900 – 1,050 km (depending on the type of target)	Mach 13.2 (IIA)	Ship and land silo	$27,915,625 (IIA), $9,698,617 (IB)
Nike Zeus (B) (Note: The U.S. ABM concepts proposed in the 1950s, 60s and 70s share a common genesis, with overlapping technologies and often confusingly similar names. Refer to the individual articles on these topics for fuller discussions of their histories and characteristics.)	United States	Canceled 1963, ASAT role to 1964	Re-entry	ICBM, ASAT	10,300 kg	Nuclear 400 KT	400 km	280 km	Mach 4+	Silo	
Safeguard/Spartan (Note: The precursor programs to Safeguard (or follow-on to Nike-Zeus) were Nike-X and then the Sentinel programs. These projects incorporated most of the same systems and concepts, differing chiefly in scope of coverage and defensive philosophy. Nike-X emphasized close-range interception using small, fast missiles with low-yield neutron-enhanced weapons for the terminal defense component. These became Sprint. Sentinel resurrected Nike-Zeus, now named Spartan, alongside Sprint, using large x-ray-enhanced nuclear warheads for the Spartan exo-atmospheric component, allowing the system to operate with significantly loosened accuracy requirements due to the much greater kill radius of an x-ray-enhanced nuclear explosive outside the atmosphere compared to pure blast or neutron effects. After China demonstrated a nuclear capability in 1967, Nike-X became the Sentinel program, using both Spartan and Sprint, but in a scaled-back scope.)	United States	1975–76	Exo atmospheric	ICBM	13,100 kg	Nuclear 5 MT	740 km	560 km	Mach 3–4	Silo	
Safeguard/Sprint (Note: Sprint was the principal component of Nike-X, and was combined with Spartan for Sentinel.)	United States	1975–76	Terminal	ICBM	3,500 kg	Nuclear low KT	40 km	30 km	Mach 10+	Silo	
Sentry/Overlay	United States	1977–83 (study)	Exo-atmospheric	ICBM				Exo-atmospheric		Silo	
Sentry/LoAD (Note: LoAD used a Sprint-like missile.)	United States	1977–83 (study)	Terminal	ICBM		Conventional or nuclear		15 km		Silo	
Ground-Based Midcourse Defense/GBI (Note: The GBI uses a three-stage booster based on the Minotaur-C launch vehicle, itself a derivative of the Peacekeeper/MX ICBM.)	United States	2010–present	Mid-course	ICBM	21,600 kg	Kill vehicle				Silo	$70,000,000
Next Generation Interceptor	United States	In development	Mid-course	ICBM		Kill vehicle				Silo	$111,000,000

== See also ==
- Missile defense systems by country
- Anti-ballistic missile defense countermeasure

== Notes ==
- System name: Many systems have numerous iterations or block upgrades, or have had multiple names. The primary or current system in use is described and noted, with the specific weapon iteration noted as appropriate.
- Period of use: ABM systems have protracted development periods. The time the system is or was in operational use is described.
- Intercept: Most systems can be used in different phases of ballistic missile flight, i.e., boost (where surface or air-launched anti-aircraft missiles might also be effective because the ballistic missile is moving relatively slowly at low altitude), requiring proximity to the launch site and immediate response, mid-course/exo-atmospheric, and re-entry/terminal. The principal intended phase of ballistic missile interception is noted. Other phases may be tried, with less effect. The earlier in flight that a missile is intercepted, the greater area a system may defend. Mid-course interception requires an ABM launch position between the ballistic missile launch site and the area defended. Terminal defense usually protects a relatively small area (i.e., Moscow, Minot Air Force Base missile fields) from projectiles in the re-entry phase.
- Role: Ballistic missile speed roughly corresponds to range. MRBMs move faster than SRBMs, IRBMs faster than MRBMs, and ICBMs faster than IRBMs. Each iteration demands greater speed, range, and targeting capability (either in accuracy or warhead power).
- Weight: Weight roughly correlates to one or more of range/ceiling, speed/acceleration, or warhead size.
- Warhead type: Lacking precision guidance systems, early systems relied on nuclear blast to destroy ballistic missiles. Systems intended for dual-role anti-aircraft/anti-SRBM and MRBM systems typically use blast/fragmentation warheads. Newer systems intended for IRBMs and ICBMs with high-altitude interception typically use hit-to-kill kinetic intercept profiles.
- Range and ceiling: Maximum range does not necessarily coincide with maximum ceiling.
- Speed: Speed, along with ceiling, correlates to intercept capability, with ICBMs demanding the greatest speed and acceleration. The terminal defense role of the Sprint system demanded extraordinary acceleration over a very brief period to intercept ICBMs that leaked through higher-altitude defense systems, or which were revealed when decoys disappeared at lower altitudes. A high speed at low altitude (as with Sprint) is much more challenging than a high speed at high altitude.
- Cost: Selected approximate costs are indicated for specific versions/blocks. These may vary significantly depending on the years procured and which upgrades they may incorporate. For instance, the cost of an SM-6 may vary by more than 100% depending on which version is examined, from about $4.25 million for Block I/IA to about $8.5 million in 2024 costs for Block IB. Costs in general appear to decline over time for United States weapons of the same version.
- Hypersonic weapons: Nearly all ballistic missiles reach hypersonic speeds during re-entry, leading to assertions that they are "hypersonic weapons." Strictly speaking, hypersonic weapons are not purely ballistic in their action, and use aerodynamic maneuvering to complicate or defeat interception by anti-ballistic missiles, rather than minor maneuvering to refine targeting accuracy, as advanced ballistic missiles may do.

The Israeli Iron Dome system is not specifically an anti-ballistic missile system, as it is intended primarily to counter unguided rockets and artillery projectiles, rather than guided missiles on trajectories that take them above Earth's atmosphere, re-entering at extreme velocities. Iron Dome uses principles that are similar to a true anti-ballistic missile system to intercept slower-moving short-range rockets and artillery projectiles, employing the Tamir missile at ranges of up to 70 km and altitudes to 10 km, at a cost of about $50,000 per missile. Iron Dome also has an anti-aircraft capability.

The U.S. Strategic Defense Initiative (SDI) investigated a variety of missile defense strategies, many involving exotic technologies such as the X-ray lasers envisioned by Project Excalibur, or the Brilliant Pebbles kinetic-kill satellite system. None of the more exotic systems were pursued to prototyping.
