= S-500 missile system =

Mobile surface-to-air missile air defense

S-500 Prometheus C-500 Прометей
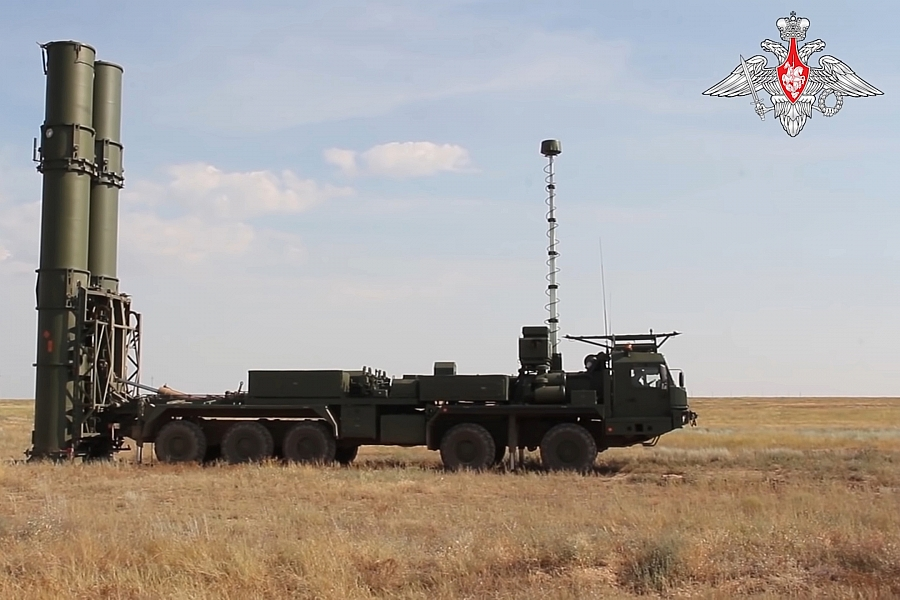
- Launch vehicle of the S-500 air defense system
- Type: Mobile surface-to-air missile
- Place of origin: Russian Federation

Service history
- In service: 16 September 2021
- Used by: Russian Space Forces

Production history
- Designer: Almaz-Antey
- Manufacturer: Almaz-Antey
- Unit cost: $2.5 billion
- Produced: 2021–present
- No. built: 1 S-500 regiment in service

Specifications
- Operational range: 600 km

The S-500 Prometheus (Russian: C-500 Прометей), also known as 55R6M "Triumfator-M", is a Russian surface-to-air missile/anti-ballistic missile system supplementing the S-400 and the A-235 ABM missile system. The S-500 was developed by the Almaz-Antey Air Defence Concern. Initially planned to be in production by 2014, the first unit entered service in 2021 with the 15th Aerospace Army. Russia claims that the S-500 is capable of intercepting all types of modern hypersonic weapons, and has claimed to have successfully tested such capability. Russia is reportedly planning to deploy the S-500 alongside the planned S-550 missile system as part of its air defense network.

== History ==
According to the original plans, ten S-500 battalions were to be purchased for the Russian Aerospace Defense (VKO) under the State Armament Programme 2020 (GPV-2020).

As of 2013, the S-500s were intended to work in parallel with S-400s, and the systems together were planned to replace most of the S-300 missile systems. The first units are planned to be deployed around the Moscow Oblast and the country's central area in 2025. A naval version is the likely armament for the new Lider-class destroyer, which was to enter service after 2020 but was not operational as of 2022.

CEO of Rostec Corporation Sergey Chemezov declared the beginning of S-500 production on 30 June 2019. Despite that, serial production of the first 10 systems (ordered in late 2020) only began in 2021. In summer 2020 Sergey Surovikin, the commander of the Aerospace Forces, seemed to confirm that the S-500 system can be used to kill satellites.

A new contract was signed in August 2022. In October 2023, Defense News claimed that production of S-500 remained behind, being negatively affected by the sanctions against Russia and labor shortages.

The cost for one S-500 system was estimated be around $700–$800 million in 2020, and up to $2.5 billion in 2023.

=== Testing ===
In May 2018, Russia conducted the longest range surface-to-air missile test to date with the S-500. According to reports citing unnamed sources familiar with U.S. intelligence on the program, the S-500 was able to hit a target 482 km (300 mi) away, which is 80 km further than the previous record.

In July 2021, the Russian MOD released the first public footage of a live-fire test of the new S-500 anti-ballistic missile system at Kapustin Yar.

=== Operational history ===
The first S-500 prototype went on combat duty in Moscow on 13 October 2021. However, it did not yet meet the full set of requirements specified by its operator, the 1st Special Purpose Air and Missile Defense Army. In June 2024, Ukraine claimed the S-500 had been deployed to the Crimean peninsula to defend the Kerch Bridge. In its operational debut in Ukraine, the S-500 allegedly proved unsuccessful in defending against Ukrainian launched MGM-140 ATACMS missiles.

== Design ==
The S-500 is designed for intercepting and destroying ballistic missiles, as well as hypersonic cruise missiles and aircraft. With a planned range of 600 km (370 mi) for anti-ballistic missile (ABM) and 500 km (310 mi) for air defense, the S-500 was envisaged to be able to detect and simultaneously engage up to 10 ballistic hypersonic targets flying at up to a maximum of 7 km/s (4.3 mi/s). The altitude of a target engaged is claimed to be as high as 180–200 km (110–120 mi). However, as of 2023, the S-500's ability to intercept hypersonic missiles had not yet been tested. Other targets it has been announced to defend against include unmanned aerial vehicles, LEO satellites, space weapons launched from hypersonic aircraft, and hypersonic orbital platforms. It is to have a response time of less than 4 seconds (compared to the S-400's of less than 10).

=== Components ===
The S-500 consists of:

- 77P6 Launch vehicle, based on the BAZ-69096 10x10 truck
- 55K6MA and 85Zh6-2 Command posts, based on BAZ-69092-12 6x6
- 91N6A(M) Acquisition/Battle Management radar, a modification of the 91N6 (Big Bird) towed by the BAZ-6403.01 8x8 tractor
- 96L6-TsP Acquisition radar, an upgraded version of the 96L6 (Cheese Board) on BAZ-69096 10x10
- 76T6 Multimode Engagement radar on BAZ-6909-022 8x8
- 77T6 ABM Engagement radar on BAZ-69096 10x10

The missiles used by the system are:

- 40N6M – Anti-aircraft
- 77N6 / 77N6-N1 – Anti-ballistic/Anti-satellite

== Export ==
In September 2021, Russian Deputy Prime Minister Yury Borisov said that India could be a prospective, and probably the first, S-500 customer.

In September 2025, it was reported that India was interested in procuring some S-500 units due to the performance of its predecessor (the S-400) during the May 2025 India–Pakistan conflict. By October, reports stated that India was instead looking to purchase more S-400 missile system batteries.

== See also ==
- List of medium-range and long-range SAMs
- A-135 anti-ballistic missile system
- A-235 anti-ballistic missile system
- Arrow (Israeli missile)
  - Arrow 3
- Comparison of anti-ballistic missile systems
- Ground-Based Midcourse Defense
- Medium Extended Air Defense System
- S-300VM missile system
- Vityaz missile system
- HQ-19 – (China)
- THAAD – (United States)
