= Arrow 3 =

Arrow 3 חץ 3
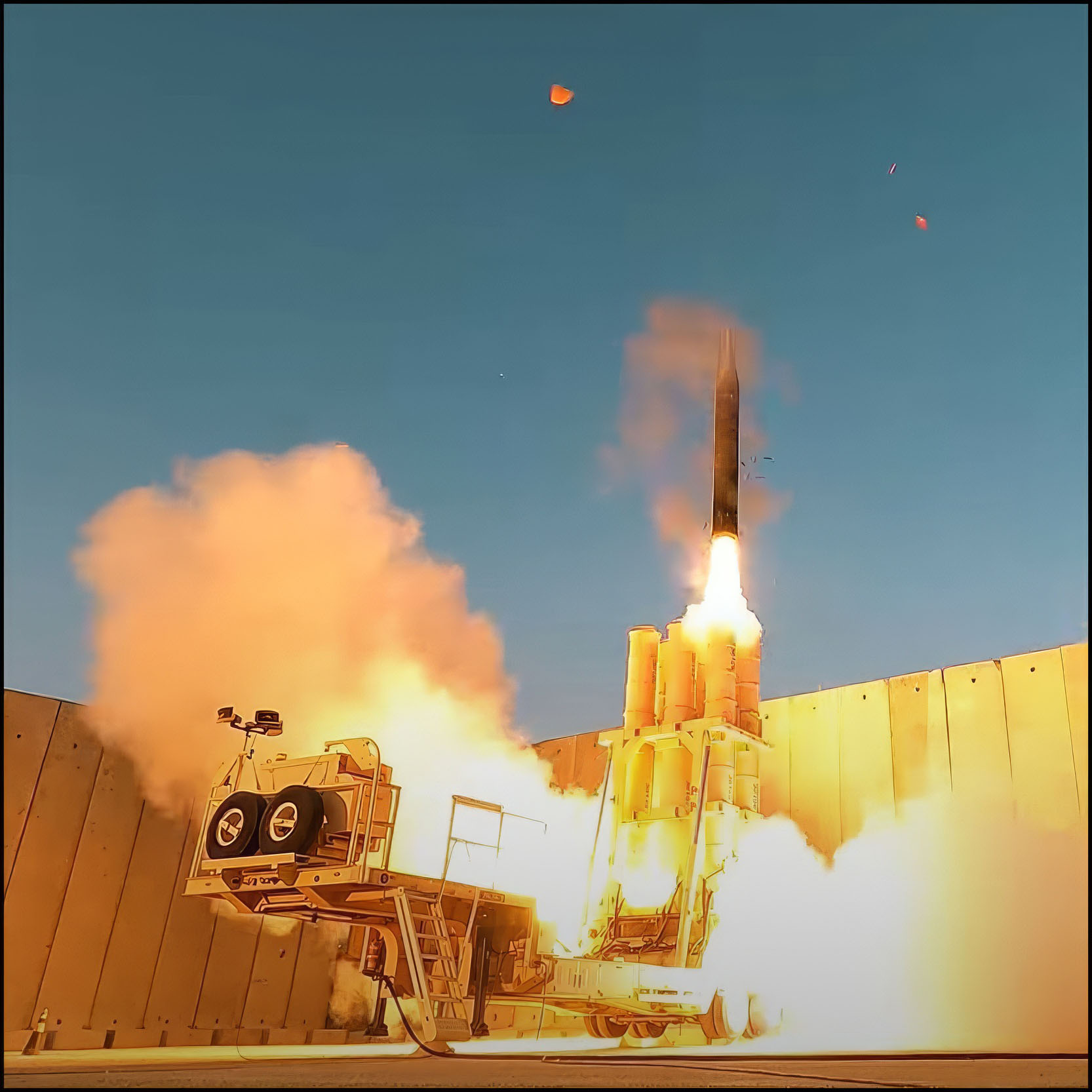
- Arrow 3 launched during Operation Rising Lion, 2025.
- Type: Exoatmospheric anti-ballistic missile Potential anti-satellite weapon
- Place of origin: Israel; United States

Service history
- Used by: Israel; Germany
- Wars: 2024 Iran–Israel conflict Red Sea crisis Twelve-Day War

Production history
- Designer: Israel Aerospace Industries
- Manufacturer: Israel Aerospace Industries, Boeing
- Produced: 2017–present

Specifications
- Engine: Two-stage
- Flight ceiling: > 100 km
- Maximum speed: Hypersonic
- Guidance system: Inertial navigation system (INS) gimbaled seeker
- Steering system: Thrust vectoring
- Launch platform: Rapid launch fortified underground silos

The Arrow 3 or Hetz 3 (Hebrew: חֵץ 3, pronounced [ˈχet͡s] or pronounced [ˈħet͡s]) is an exoatmospheric anti-ballistic missile, jointly funded, developed and produced by Israel and the United States. Undertaken by Israel Aerospace Industries (IAI) and Boeing, it is overseen by the Israeli Ministry of Defense's "Homa" (Hebrew: חומה, pronounced [χoma], "rampart") administration and the U.S. Missile Defense Agency. It provides exo-atmospheric interception of ballistic missiles (during the space-flight portion of their trajectory), including intercontinental ballistic missiles (ICBMs) carrying nuclear, chemical, biological or conventional warheads. With divert motor capability, its kill vehicle can switch directions dramatically. It can also be adapted for an anti-satellite role: it has sensors that can pivot 90 degrees in order to detect approaching satellites. The missile's reported flight range is up to 2,400 km (1,500 mi).

According to the chairman of the Israeli Space Agency, Arrow 3 may serve as an anti-satellite weapon, which would make Israel one of the world's few countries capable of destroying orbiting satellites.

== Background ==
In August 2008 the Israeli and United States governments began development of an upper-tier component to the Israeli Air Defense Command, known as Arrow 3, "with a kill ratio of around 99 percent". The development is based on an architecture definition study conducted in 2006–2007, determining the need for the upper-tier component to be integrated into Israel's ballistic missile defense system. According to Arieh Herzog, then Director of Israel Missile Defense Organization (IMDO), the main element of this upper tier will be an exoatmospheric interceptor, to be jointly developed by IAI and Boeing.

The new component will also require the integration of longer range detection, tracking and discrimination capability, beyond what the "Green Pine" and "Super Green Pine" radars employed with the Arrow 2 are providing. Among the advanced sensors considered for Israel's future multi-tier system, are airborne electro-optical sensors deployed on high flying unmanned aerial vehicles and future enhanced "Green Pine" radars, as well as the AN/TPY-2 radar already deployed in Israel, and operated by U.S. forces.

The multibillion-dollar development program of the Arrow is a joint development between Israel and the United States.

U.S. contributions to Arrow 3 program
Fiscal year	Millions of U.S. dollars
2008	30.0
2009	50.036
2010	58.966
2011	66.220
2012	74.700
2013	74.707
2014	74.707
2015	89.550
2016	20.0
2017	204.893
2018	310.0
2019	80.0
2020	55.0
2021	77.0

== Development ==
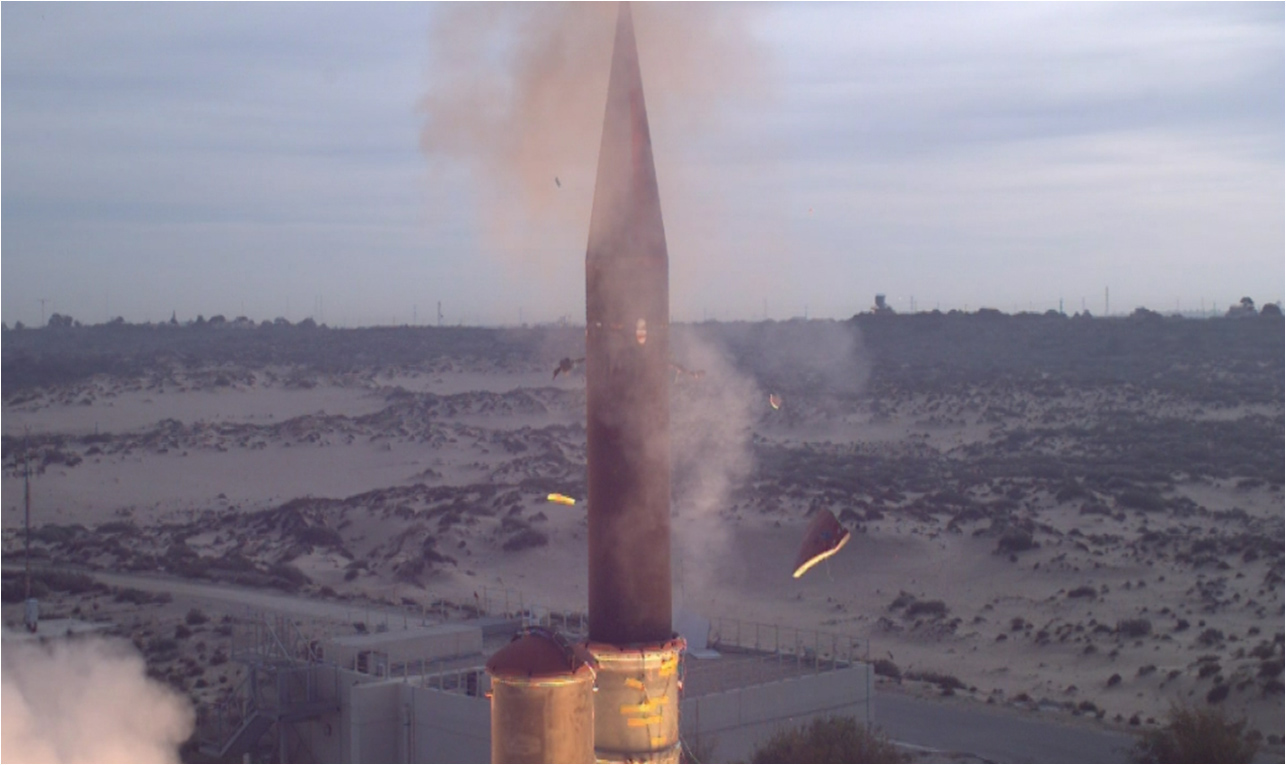
Arrow 3 launch in February 2013.

An exo-atmospheric interception on 10 December 2015.

The design of Arrow 3 promises to be an extremely capable system, more advanced than what we have ever attempted in the U.S. with our programs. [...] This has to do with the seekers that have greater flexibility and other aspects, such as propulsion systems – it will be an extremely capable system.

— Lt. Gen. Patrick J. O'Reilly, Director of the U.S. Missile Defense Agency (2009)

IAI began preliminary tests of the Arrow 3 in 2011. The company will not specify what tests were performed, but they are part of the preparations for a full fly-out test. On 23 January 2012, the Israeli Ministry of Defense released photographs and video of the recent successful fly-out tests from Palmachim Airbase. During the tests, a model of the interceptor missile was launched in order to check the starting and propulsion system, as well as other tracking sensors.

On 23 January 2012, IAI announced an agreement to jointly work on the Arrow 3 with Boeing. Boeing is responsible for 40–50 percent of the production content of the Arrow 3. Expected work content includes motorcases, shroud, canister, safe & arm / ignition devices, power devices (batteries), and inertial navigation units, as well as several avionics packages and actuators & valves.

On 25 February 2013, a fly-out test of the Arrow 3 was conducted from Palmachim Airbase. The launch tested the missile control and engines. According to a senior defense source, the missile obtained hypersonic speed, and reached an altitude of 100 km (62 mi), entering space. It followed various objects, such as stars, and gained further altitude. Its engine stopped after six minutes.

On 3 January 2014, another successful test of the Arrow 3 was conducted from Palmachim Airbase. During the test the interceptor entered space and carried out a range of maneuvers in response to a virtual incoming enemy missile. The test involved the activation of two of the interceptor's engines, the first of which brought it into space, and the second allowing it to carry out complex maneuvers.

In December 2014 a test aimed to debut an exo-atmospheric intercept capabilities of Arrow 3 has been characterized as a "no test", given that "conditions did not allow for" actual launch of the intercepting missile.

On 10 December 2015, Arrow 3 scored its first intercept in a complex test designed to validate how the system can detect, identify, track and then discriminate real from decoy targets delivered into space by an improved Silver Sparrow target missile. According to officials, the milestone test paves the way toward low-rate initial production of the Arrow 3.

On 19 February 2018, Arrow 3 flight test took place in Israel. Another test took place on 22 January 2019.

In a series of tests in July 2019 at the Pacific Spaceport Complex in Kodiak, Alaska, the Arrow 3 system successfully intercepted 3 "enemy" rockets, one of them outside the atmosphere. The tests demonstrated Arrow 3's ability to intercept exo-atmospheric targets.

== Specifications ==
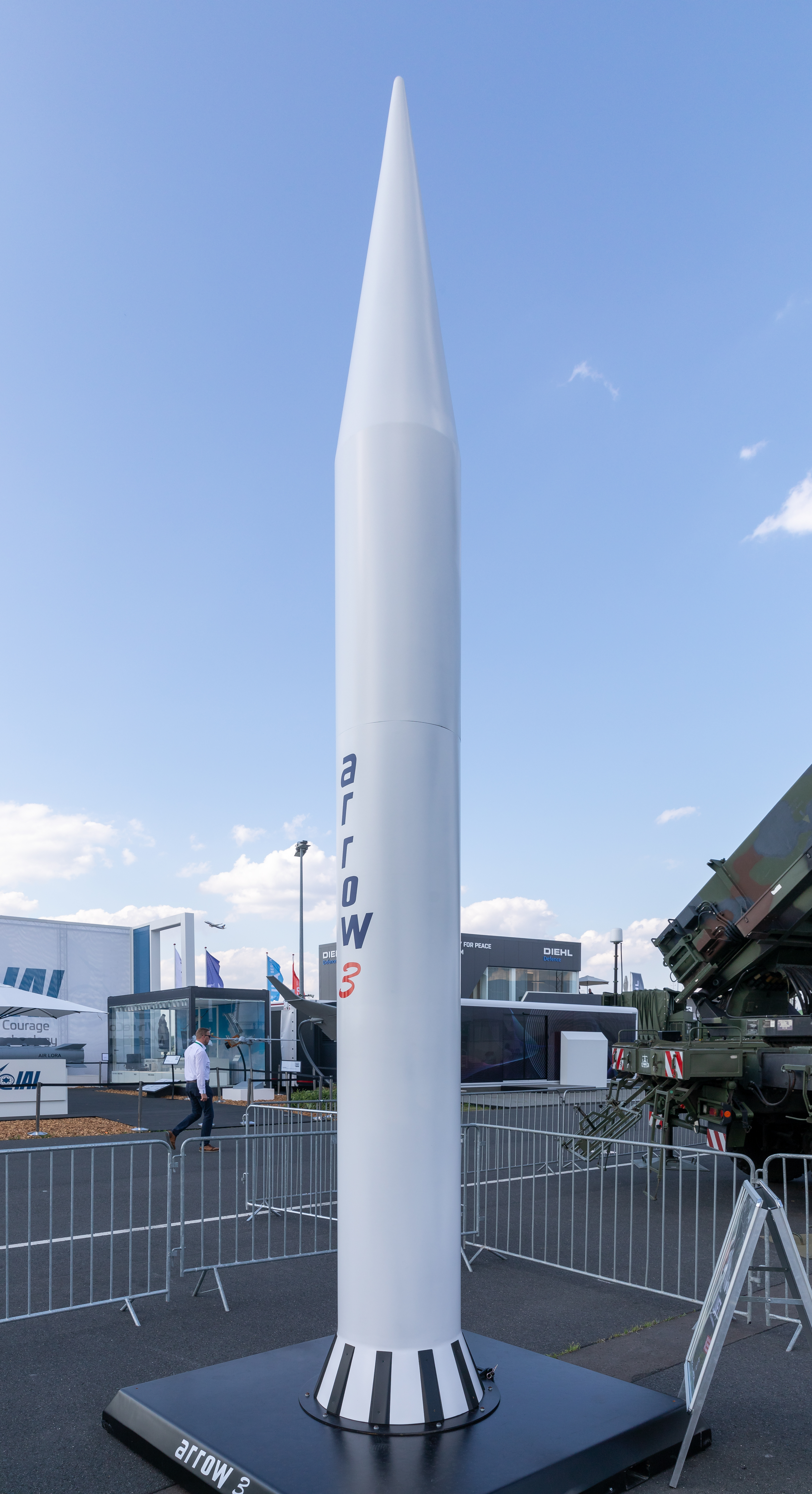
Arrow 3 static display at ILA 2024

External images
- Arrow 3 kill vehicle on display at the 2009 Paris Air Show
- Computer-generated image of Arrow 3 kill vehicle in space

Israel Aerospace Industries announced in June 2009, that the Arrow 3 patented exoatmospheric interception method includes a two-stage interceptor, like the Arrow 2, but purely based on hit-to-kill technology. Unlike most kill vehicles, which use liquid or gas propulsion, the new Israeli kill vehicle will be propelled by an ordinary solid rocket motor equipped with a thrust-vectoring nozzle. It will also be fitted with a gimbaled seeker for hemispheric coverage. By measuring the seeker's line-of-sight propagation relative to the vehicle's motion, the kill vehicle will use proportional navigation to divert its course and line up exactly with the target's flight path. Joseph Hasson, chief missile designer at IAI, who patented the new kill vehicle with his colleague Galya Goldner, says that the concept is relatively simple, reliable and inexpensive, and is based on mature technologies. Furthermore, the kill vehicle's divert capability and agility reduce the need for detection and tracking systems, which usually accompany remote sensor-assisted exoatmospheric kills. IAI displayed a full-sized model of the Arrow 3 missile and its kill vehicle at the June 2009 Paris Air Show.

Arrow 3 should be able to intercept ballistic missiles, especially those carrying weapons of mass destruction, at altitudes of over 100 km (62 mi), and in greater ranges. It could also be ship-based. Arrow 3 is faster than the Arrow 2 and slightly smaller, weighing nearly half.

An Arrow 3 battery is expected to intercept salvos of more than five ballistic missiles within 30 seconds. Arrow 3 can be launched into an area of space before it is known where the target missile is going. When the target and its course are identified, the Arrow interceptor is redirected using its thrust-vectoring nozzle to close the gap and conduct a "body-to-body" interception.

Arrow 3 may have a reduced 30-year life-cycle cost. It should use the same launch system as Arrow 2. In 2010 it was reported to cost $2–3 million per unit, while program cost was estimated at $700–$800 million over three years.

According to numerous Israeli experts, including Prof. Isaac Ben-Israel, former director of the Israeli Administration for the Development of Weapons and Technological Infrastructure and currently the chairman of the Israeli Space Agency, it is also possible that the Arrow 3 could serve as an anti-satellite weapon.

== Production ==
Stark, a U.S.-based subsidiary of Israel Aerospace Industries, was chosen to manufacture canisters for the Arrow 3, and made the first delivery in September 2018.

== Deployment ==
According to Jane's Defence Weekly in 2013, a solicitation that outlines the expansion of an Israeli Air Force facility at Tal Shahar, roughly halfway between Jerusalem and Ashdod, near Beit Shemesh, indicates that almost certainly it will be used for four Arrow 3 launchers on sites cut into the surrounding hills. The estimated completion date would be around the end of 2014. Each of the four launchers will have six missiles for a total of 24 interceptors. The plans for the base were revealed in a routine United States Department of Defense contract solicitation. Arrow 3 was declared operational on 18 January 2017.

On 31 October 2023, an Arrow 2 missile intercepted a long-range ballistic missile launched at Israel from Houthis in Yemen. This marks its first operational use during a war, and its first interception of a ground to ground ballistic missile. Since the interception occurred outside of Earth's atmosphere, it is considered to be the first ever instance of space warfare.

On 9 November 2023, for the first time, the Arrow 3 successfully intercepted a Houthi missile heading from Yemen to the country's southernmost city of Eilat.

On 13 April 2024, Iran carried out a massive missile and drone attack, targeting major military and civilian centers in Israel. The attack was intercepted and thwarted by missile interception systems, such as the Israeli Arrow 3 system, with the cooperation of the United States, Jordan, the United Kingdom and France on 14 April 2024.

On 14 and 28 September 2024 Houthi ballistic missiles were intercepted by the Arrow 3 system.

== Exports ==
=== Operators ===
- Germany — Germany purchased the system as part of the European Sky Shield Initiative to defend against potential Russian missile threats. The Bundestag approved the procurement in June 2023, with operational deployment planned for 2025. The deal received U.S. approval in August 2023 and, at US$3.5 billion became the biggest defence contract in Israeli history. On 3 December 2025, the German Air Force activated the first elements of the system at Holzdorf Air Base. Shortly afterward, Germany approved an additional $3.1 billion expansion of its Arrow 3 procurement, bringing its total investment to roughly $6.5 billion and marking a major boost for Israel's missile-defense industry and its role in Europe's emerging air-defense architecture. Germany's Arrow 3 system reached initial operational capability at Holzdorf Air Base in December 2025; the Bundestag subsequently approved a EUR 3 billion expansion, bringing the combined programme value beyond US$6.5 billion.

=== Potential operators ===
- Azerbaijan — Azerbaijan was considering purchasing the system during the 2021 tensions with Iran.

== See also ==
- RIM-161 Standard Missile 3
- S-300VM missile system
- S-400 missile system
- S-500 missile system
- HQ-19
- Terminal High Altitude Area Defense
- Indian Ballistic Missile Defence Programme
- Comparison of anti-ballistic missile systems
