= HQ-26 =

Chinese anti-ballistic missile system

- Type: Surface to air missile Anti-Ballistic Missile; Anti-Satellite missile
- Place of origin: China

Service history
- Used by: People's Liberation Army Air Force

Specifications
- Operational range: 400 km (250 mi)
- Flight altitude: 200 km
- Launch platform: Surface ship; Land platform

The HQ-26 (Chinese: 红旗-26; pinyin: Hóng Qí-26; lit. 'Red Banner-26') is an anti-ballistic missile (ABM) and anti-satellite weapon (ASAT) system under development by the People's Republic of China. The HQ-26 is reportedly a mid-course interceptor missile project led by the People's Liberation Army Navy (PLAN), designed for the Type 055 destroyer and other naval ships and roughly comparable to the American SM-3 anti-ballistic missiles. The missile was likely a vastly improved HQ-16 with the capability to intercept intermediate-range ballistic missiles (IRBM), short- and medium-range ballistic missiles, cruise missiles, and aircraft at a range of 400 km (250 mi).

== See also ==
- HQ-16
- HQ-19
- HQ-29
