= 53T6 =

USSR anti-ballistic missile

53T6 (ABM-3 Gazelle)
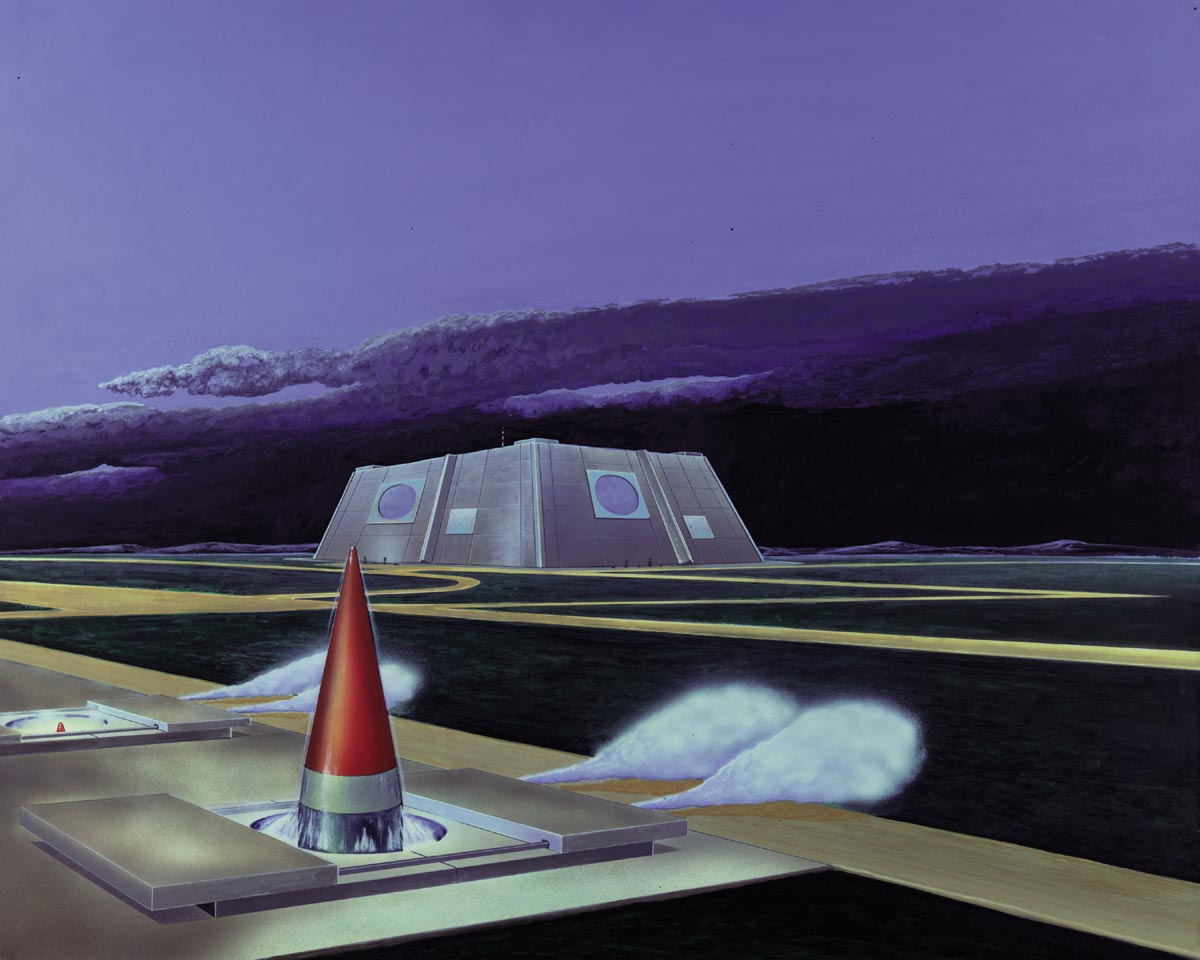
- The 53T6 sitting in its silo.
- Type: Anti-ballistic missile
- Place of origin: Soviet Union

Service history
- In service: Since 1995
- Used by: Russia
- Wars: Cold War

Production history
- Designer: NPO Novator Design Bureau
- Designed: 1978
- Produced: 1988
- No. built: 68
- Variants: A modernized variant is in service as of July 2018

Specifications
- Mass: 10,000 kg (22,000 lbs)
- Length: 12 m
- Diameter: 1.8 m
- Warhead: nuclear 10 kt
- Engine: 2-stage solid fuel
- Operational range: 80–100 km
- Flight ceiling: 80–100 km
- Maximum speed: No verified data
- Launch platform: silo

The 53T6 (NATO reporting name: ABM-3 Gazelle, previously SH-08) is a USSR anti-ballistic missile. Designed in 1978 and in service since 1995, it is a component of the A-135 anti-ballistic missile system.

The missile is able to intercept incoming re-entry vehicles at a distance of 80 km. The 53T6 is a two-stage solid-propellant rocket armed with a 10 kt thermonuclear weapon. The missile is about 10 meters in length and 1.8 meters in diameter. Its launch weight is 10 tons.

The 53T6 missile is kept in a silo-based launch container. Prior to launch its cover is blown off.

== Radar support ==
The Gazelle missile system is supported by the Don-2N Pill Box radar.

== See also ==
- List of missiles
- A-235 anti-ballistic missile system
- Comparison of anti-ballistic missile systems

=== Related US missiles ===
- Nike Zeus
- Sprint (missile)
- Spartan (missile)

=== Treaties ===
- Strategic Arms Limitation Talks
- Anti-Ballistic Missile Treaty
