= Anti-ballistic missile =

Surface-to-air missile designed to counter ballistic missiles

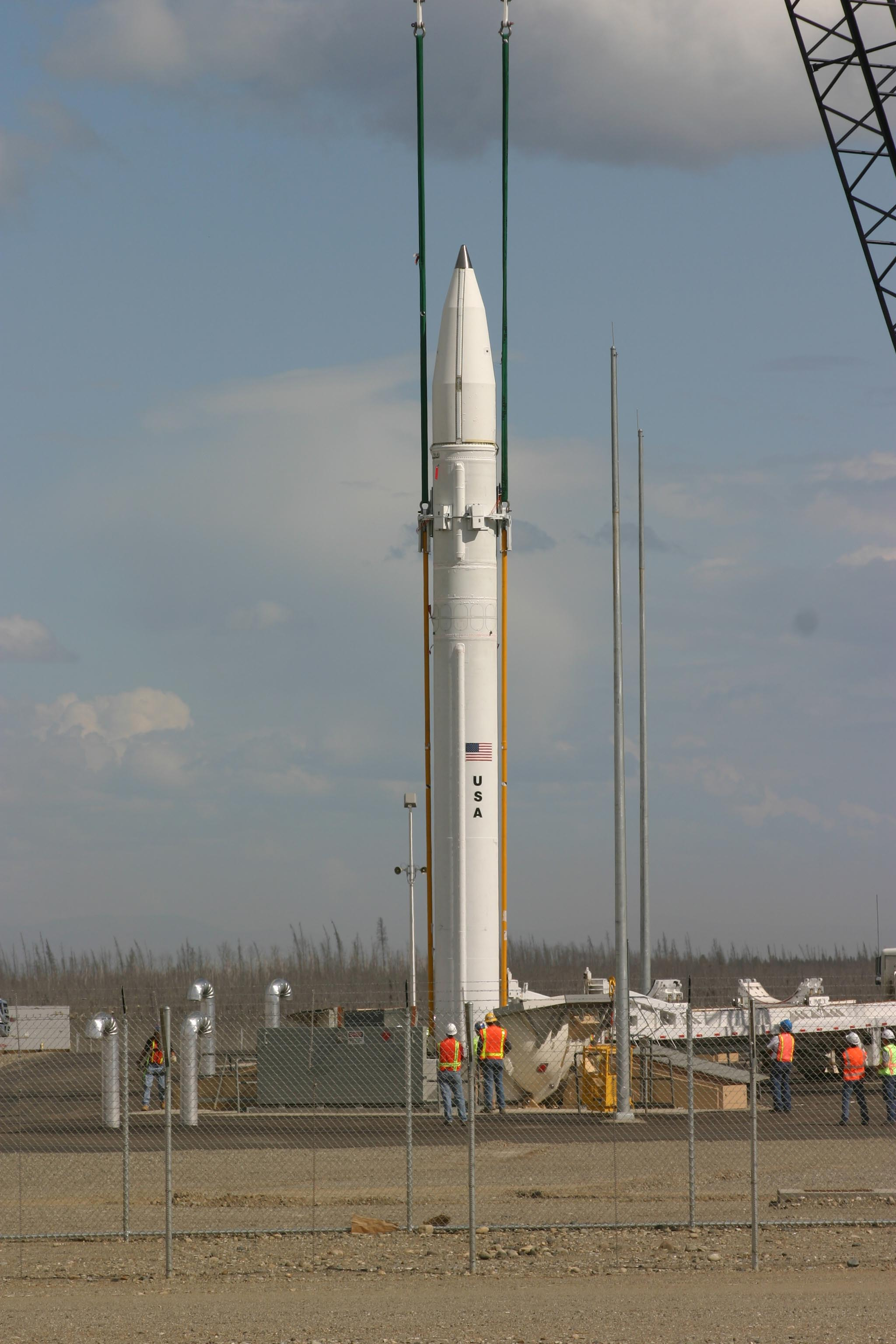
A Ground-Based Interceptor of the United States' Ground-Based Midcourse Defense system, loaded into a silo at Fort Greely, Alaska, in July 2004

An anti-ballistic missile (ABM) is a surface-to-air missile designed to destroy in-flight ballistic missiles. They achieve this explosively (chemical or nuclear), or via hit-to-kill kinetic vehicles, which may also have self-maneuvering capabilities.

Tactical systems are widely deployed to counter short and intermediate-range ballistic missiles that carry conventional warheads.

Strategic systems, deployed by the United States, Russia, China, and Israel, are capable of intercepting intercontinental ballistic missiles, typically used to carry strategic nuclear warheads. During the Cold War, the 1972 ABM Treaty limited the nuclear arms race; excessive ICBM production would have been favoured to overwhelm ABM systems. For modern strategic systems, Russia's ABMs are the only ones that are themselves armed with nuclear warheads.

== Current counter-ICBM systems ==
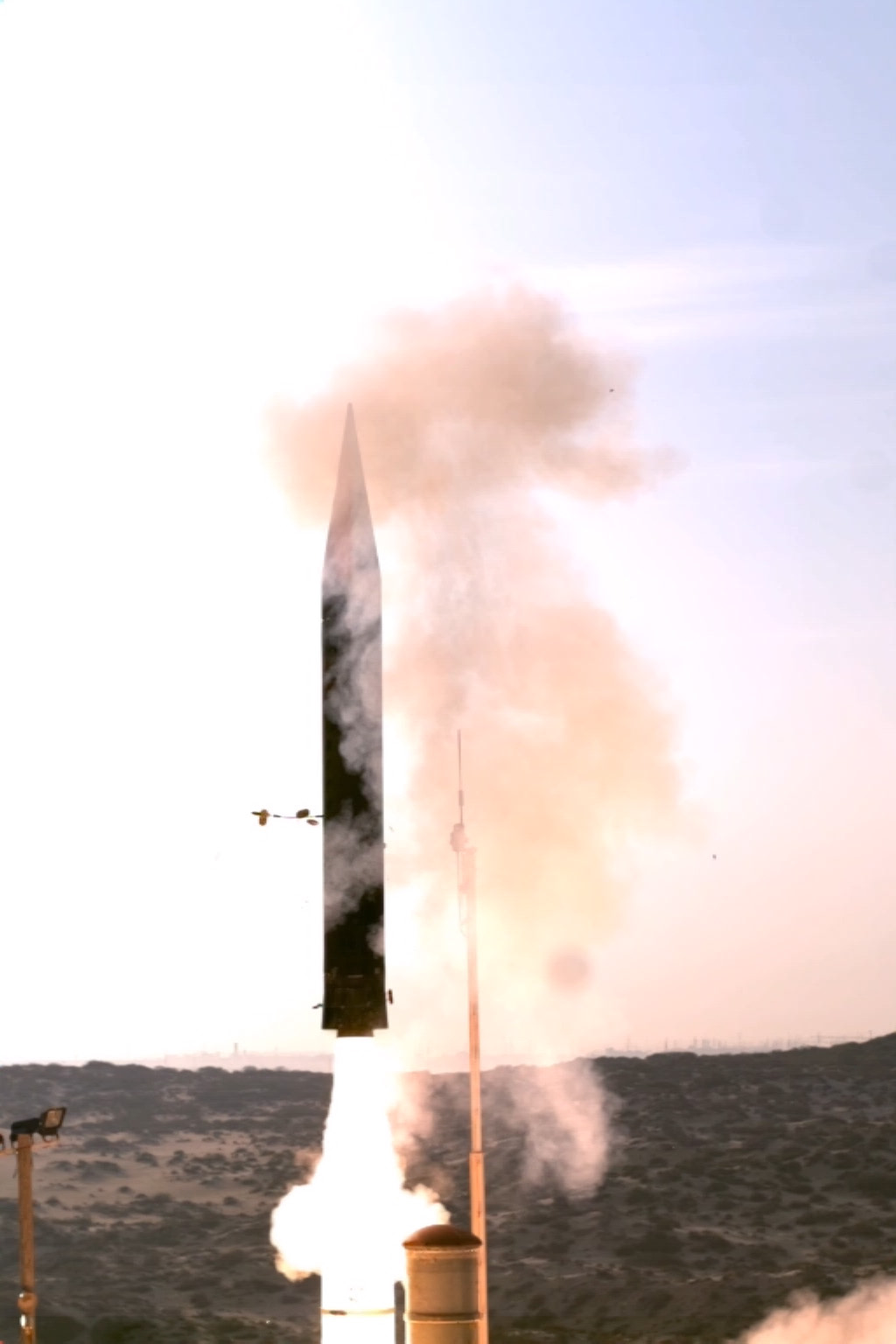
Israel's Arrow 3

There are a limited number of systems worldwide that can intercept intercontinental ballistic missiles

- The Russian A-135 anti-ballistic missile system (upgraded in 2017 to A-235) is used for the defense of Moscow. It became operational in 1995 and was preceded by the A-35 anti-ballistic missile system. The system uses Gorgon and Gazelle missiles previously armed with nuclear warheads. These missiles have been updated (2017) and use non-nuclear kinetic interceptors instead, to intercept any incoming ICBMs.
- The Israeli Arrow 3 system entered operational service in 2017. It is designed for exo-atmosphere interception of ballistic missiles during the spaceflight portion of their trajectory, including those of ICBMs. It may also act as an anti-satellite weapon.
- The American Ground-Based Midcourse Defense (GMD) system, formerly known as National Missile Defense (NMD), was first tested in 1997 and had its first successful intercept test in 1999. Instead of using an explosive charge, it launches a hit-to-kill kinetic projectile to intercept an ICBM. The current GMD system is intended to shield the United States mainland against a limited nuclear attack by a rogue state such as North Korea. GMD does not have the ability to protect against an all-out nuclear attack from Russia, as there are currently only 44 ground-based interceptors available to counter projectiles headed towards the US. (This interceptor count does not include the THAAD, or Aegis, or Patriot defenses which provide shorter range defence against incoming projectiles.)
- The Aegis ballistic missile defense-equipped SM-3 Block II-A missile demonstrated it can shoot down an ICBM target on 16 November 2020.
  - In a November 2020 test, the US launched a surrogate ICBM from Kwajalein Atoll toward Hawaii in the general direction of the continental US, which triggered a satellite warning to a Colorado Air Force base. In response, USS John Finn launched a missile which destroyed the surrogate ICBM, while still outside the atmosphere.

=== American plans for Central European site ===
During 1993, a symposium was held by western European nations to discuss potential future ballistic missile defence programs. In the end, the council recommended deployment of early warning and surveillance systems as well as regionally controlled defence systems. During spring 2006 reports about negotiations between the United States, Poland, and the Czech Republic were published. The plans propose the installation of a latest generation ABM system with a radar site in the Czech Republic and the launch site in Poland. The system was announced to be aimed against ICBMs from Iran and North Korea. This caused harsh comments by Russian President Vladimir Putin at the Organization for Security and Co-operation in Europe (OSCE) security conference during spring 2007 in Munich. Other European ministers commented that any change of strategic weapons should be negotiated on NATO level and not 'unilaterally' [sic, actually bilaterally] between the US and other states (although most strategic arms reduction treaties were between the Soviet Union and US, not NATO). The German foreign minister Frank-Walter Steinmeier, a Social Democrat, expressed severe concerns about the way in which the US had conveyed its plans to its European partners and criticised the US administration for not having consulted Russia prior to announcing its endeavours to deploy a new missile defence system in Central Europe. According to a July 2007 survey, a majority of Poles were opposed to hosting a component of the system in Poland. By 28 July 2016 Missile Defense Agency planning and agreements had clarified enough to give more details about the Aegis Ashore sites in Romania (2014) and Poland (2018).

== Current tactical systems ==
=== People's Republic of China ===
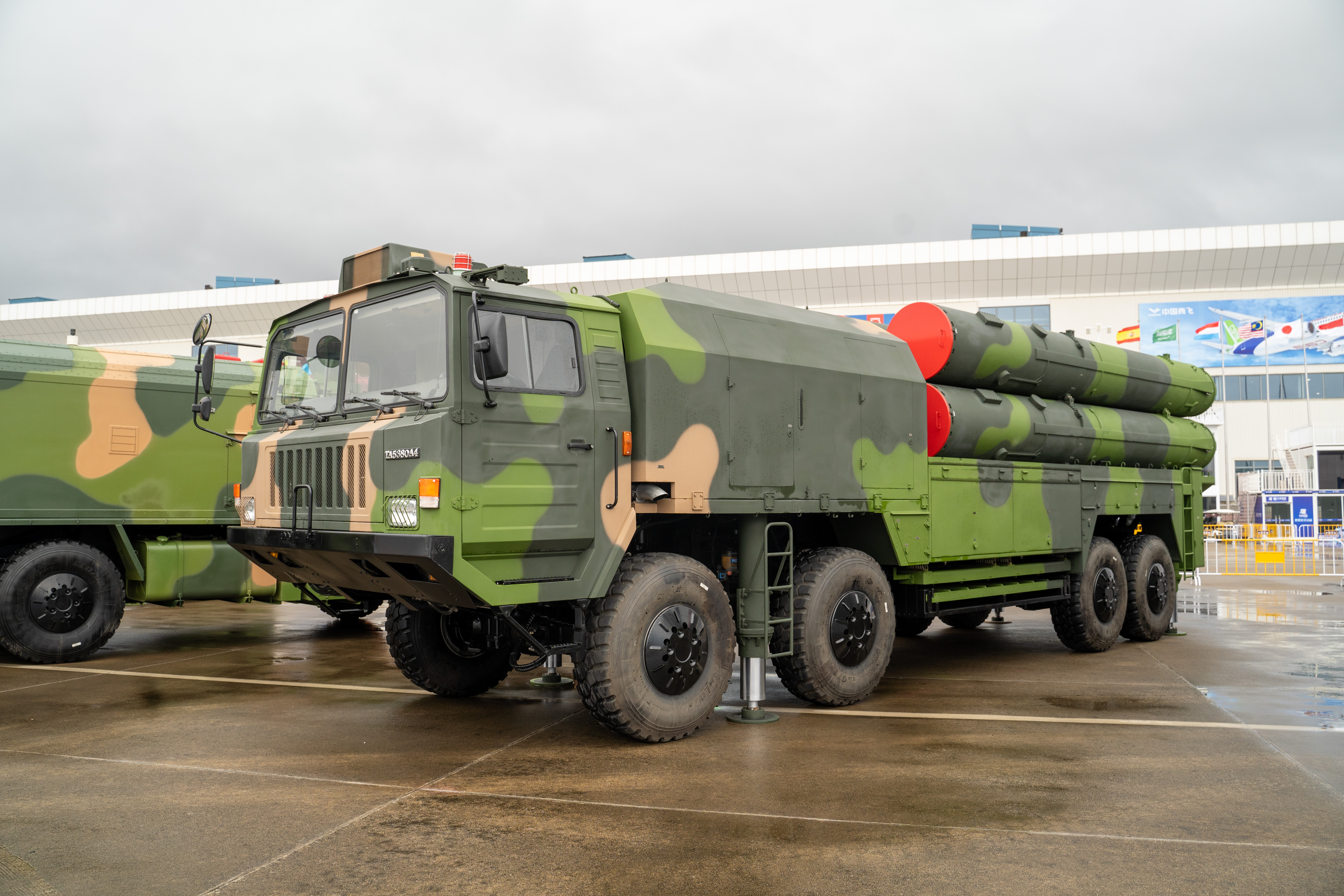
HQ-19 launcher in Zhuhai airshow 2024

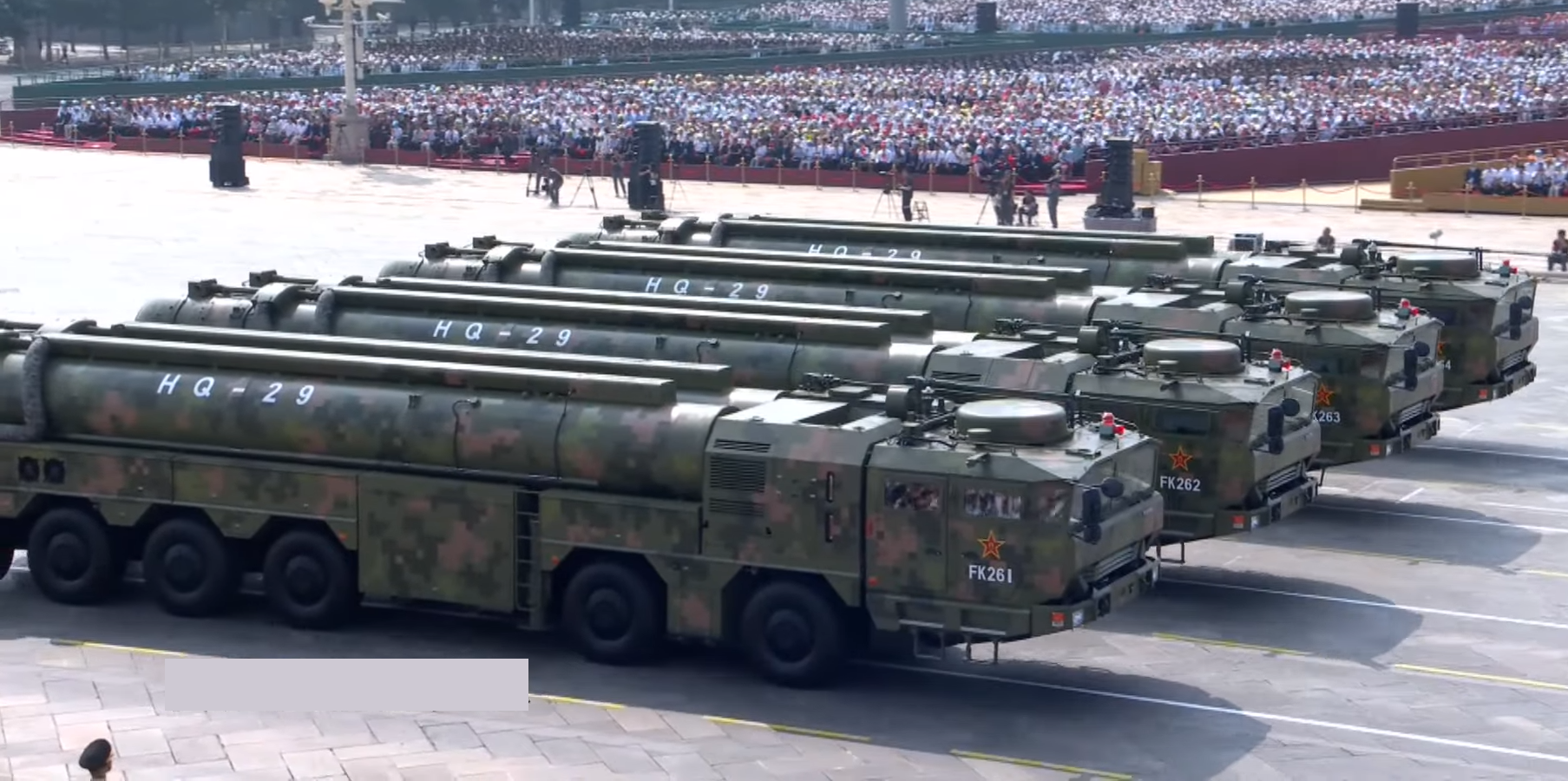
HQ-29 launcher

==== Programs ====
China's first ballistic missile defense (BMD) program was Project 640, formally started in 1966. Project 640 included the development of missiles, lasers, superguns and radar. Technical and financial constraints ended the program in 1982 without producing a BMD system. Development of ABMs became a part of the 863 Program with the goal of producing a PAC-3-like missile and performing basic research on a Terminal High Altitude Area Defense-like system within 15 years. The effort continued after the 863 Program ended in 2016.

==== Modern systems ====
In March 2006, China tested an interceptor system comparable to the US Patriot missiles.

China has acquired and is license-producing the S-300PMU-2/S-300PMU-1 series of terminal ABM-capable SAMs. The license-built HQ-15 may possess terminal ABM capabilities.

The HQ-16 is effective in intercepting tactical ballistic missiles. The system entered service in 2008.

The HQ-9 provides terminal interception against short- and medium-range ballistic missile targets. It entered service in 2001. The latest variant, HQ-9C, has a large magazine depth. Chinese Navy operates modern air-defense destroyers, such as the Type 052C destroyer and Type 051C Destroyer, which are armed with naval HQ-9 missiles.

The HQ-19 can also intercept medium, intermediate ballistic missiles at terminal or mid-course phases.

The HQ-22 can provide interception against short-range ballistic missiles at their terminal phase. The system entered operation in 2019.

The HQ-26 is a naval-based ballistic missile defense system under development.

The HQ-29 is a road-mobile system with midcourse interception capability. According to Chinese media, the missile can intercept ICBMs; authoritative and official sources do not explicitly state this capability. The missile was deployed in 2025.

=== Europe ===
==== Aster ====
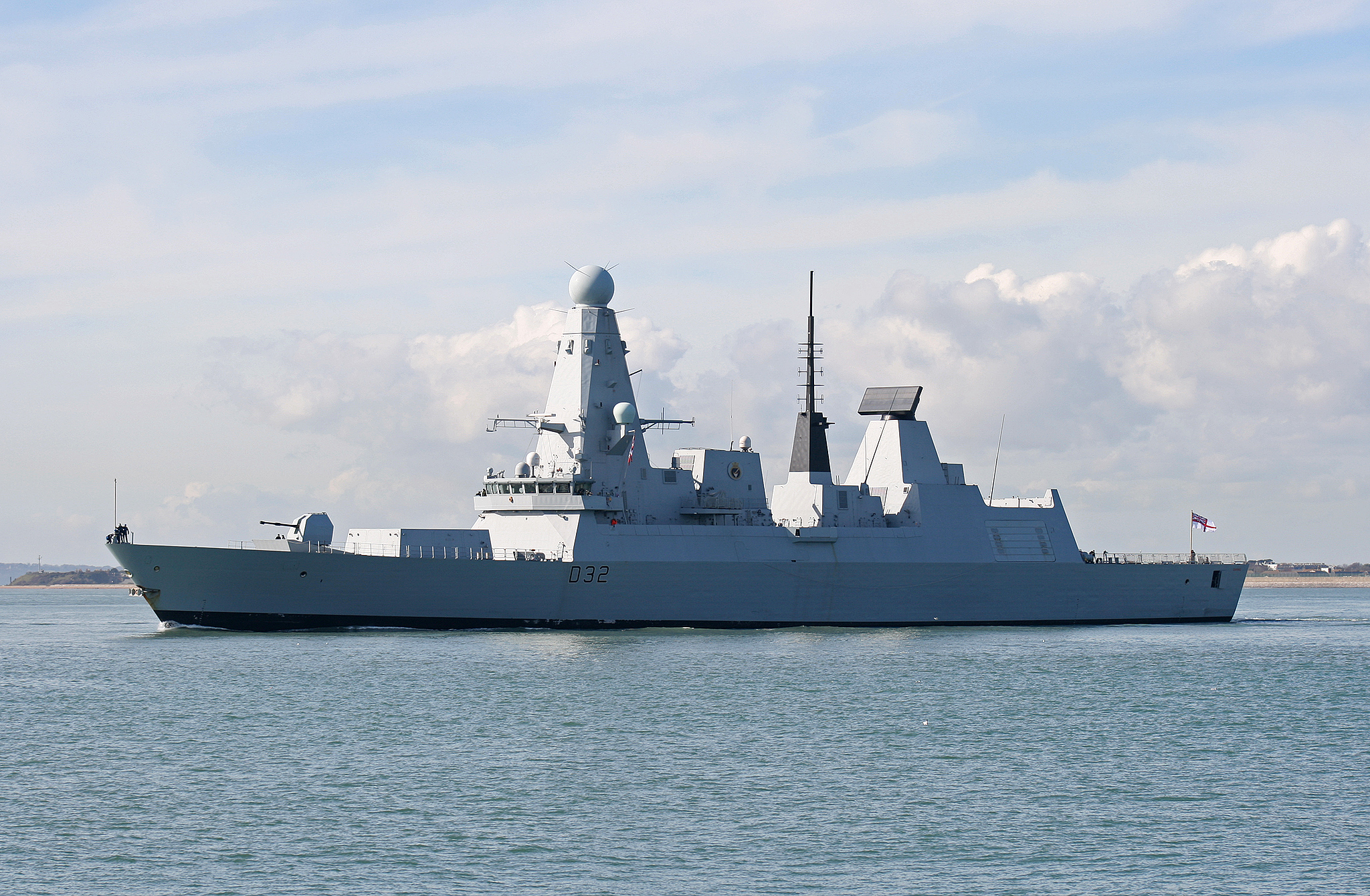
Royal Navy Type 45 destroyers (pictured), and French Navy and Italian Navy Horizon and FREMM frigates operate Aster 30 missiles

The Aster is a family of missiles jointly developed by France and Italy. The Aster 30 variants are capable of ballistic missile defense. An export customer, the United Kingdom also operates the Aster 30 Block 0.

On 18 October 2010, France announced a successful tactical ABM test of the Aster 30 missile and on 1 December 2011 a successful interception of a Black Sparrow ballistic target missile. The Horizon-class frigates in French and Italian service, the Royal Navy's Type 45 destroyers, and the French and Italian FREMM-class frigates are all armed with PAAMS (or variants of it) integrating Aster 15 and Aster 30 missiles. France and Italy are developing a new variant, the Aster 30 Block II, which can destroy ballistic missiles up to a maximum range of 3,000 km (1,900 mi). It will incorporate a kill vehicle warhead.

==== HYDIS ====
Involving France, Italy, Germany and the Netherlands, the HYDIS (Hypersonic Defence Interceptor Study) was announced on 20 June 2023 and is a project led by prime contractor MBDA France. It was selected in March 2023 and is partially funded by the European Defense Fund (EDF). Its aim is to propose an architecture and technology maturation concept study for an endo-atmospheric interceptor to counter new, highly sophisticated emerging threats. The HYDIS is centered around MBDA's Aquila hypersonic missile interceptor concept and will involve a consortium of 19 partners and over 30 subcontractors from 14 European countries. France, Germany, Italy and the Netherlands have already confirmed their support and commitment, by signing a letter of intent and agreeing to initial joint requirements. The ultimate goal of the project is to develop a countermeasure that could be integrated into the French-led EU TWISTER (Timely Warning and Interception with Space-based Theater Surveillance) capability program. TWISTER, launched in 2019 with MBDA France acting as lead contractor as well, is intended to be an air defense system capable of early warning, tracking and intercepting high-performance air threats, including defense against ballistic missiles (BMD) and hypersonic vehicles. The program involves France, Italy, Spain, the Netherlands, Finland and Germany.

==== EU HYDEF ====
Competing against the HYDIS, the EU HYDEF (European Hypersonic Defence Interceptor) also covers the concept phase to develop an endo-atmospheric interceptor and is related to TWISTER. Selected in July 2022, it is also partially funded by the EDF. It is coordinated by Spain's SENER Aeroespacial Sociedad Anonima, while Germany's Diehl Defence is serving as the overall technical lead. They are heading a consortium of partners and subcontractors from various EU countries.

=== India ===
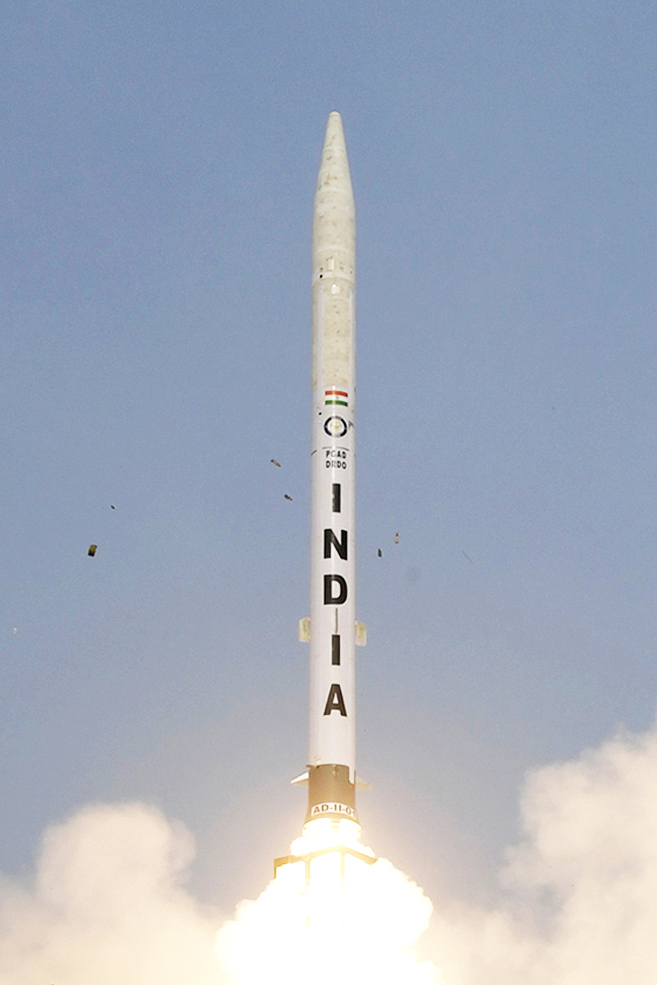
Second phase of Anti-ballistic Missile defense test with AD-2 missile

In November 2006, India successfully conducted the PADE (Prithvi Air Defence Exercise) in which an anti-ballistic missile, called the Prithvi Air Defence (PAD), an exo-atmospheric (outside the atmosphere) interceptor system, intercepted a Prithvi-II ballistic missile. The PAD missile has the secondary stage of the Prithvi missile and can reach altitude of 80 km (50 mi). During the test, the target missile was intercepted at a 50 km (31 mi) altitude. On 6 December 2007, the Advanced Air Defence (AAD) missile system was tested successfully. This missile is an endo-atmospheric interceptor with an altitude of 30 km (19 mi). First reported in 2009, the Defence Research and Development Organisation (DRDO) is developing a new Prithvi interceptor missile code-named PDV. The PDV is designed to take out the target missile at altitudes above 150 km (93 mi). The first PDV was successfully test fired on 27 April 2014. On 15 May 2016, India successfully launched AAD renamed Ashwin from Abdul Kalam Island off the coast of Odisha. As of 8 January 2020, the BMD programme has been completed and the Indian Air Force and the DRDO are awaiting government's final approval before the system is deployed to protect New Delhi and then Mumbai. After these two cities, it will be deployed in other major cities and regions. PAD and PDV are designed for mid-course interception, while AAD is for terminal phase interception. India had previously planned to acquire NASAMS-II but the Indian Air Force instead is now seeking a domestic alternative (potentially the land-based VL-SRSAM). India also operates three regiments of the S-400 missile system and Barak 8 missiles on both land and naval platforms that also provides limited cover to specific locations against ballistic missiles. on 12-Jun-2026 India successfully conducted test of the AD-1 and AD-2 anti ballistic missile defence system capable of intercepting ballistic missiles with range upto 5000 Km.

=== Iran ===
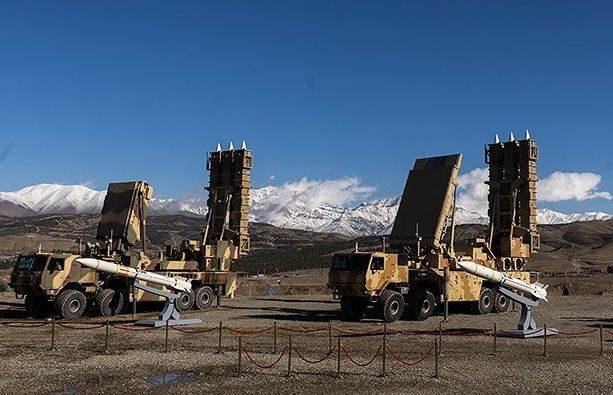
Iranian made Arman anti-ballistic missile interceptor.

Iran used Arman and S-300 missile systems for ballistic missile defense.

=== Israel ===
==== Arrow 2 ====
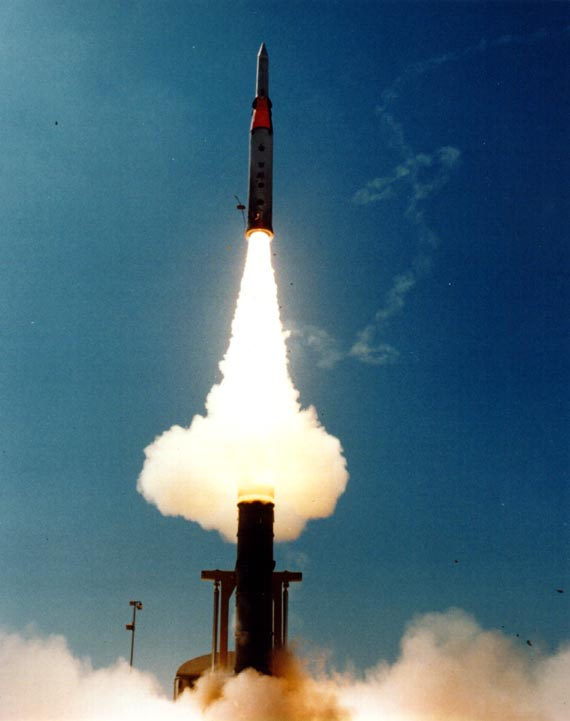
An Arrow 2 anti-ballistic missile interceptor

The Arrow project was begun after the US and Israel agreed to co-fund it on 6 May 1986.

The Arrow ABM system was designed and constructed in Israel with financial support by the United States by a multibillion-dollar development program called "Minhelet Homa" (Wall Administration) with the participation of companies like Israel Military Industries, Tadiran and Israel Aerospace Industries.

During 1998 the Israeli military conducted a successful test of their Arrow missile. Designed to intercept incoming missiles travelling at up to 2-mile/s (3 km/s), the Arrow is expected to perform much better than the Patriot did in the Gulf War. On 29 July 2004 Israel and the United States carried out a joint experiment in the US, in which the Arrow was launched against a real Scud missile. The experiment was a success, as the Arrow destroyed the Scud with a direct hit. During December 2005 the system was deployed successfully in a test against a replicated Shahab-3 missile. This feat was repeated on 11 February 2007.

==== Arrow 3 ====
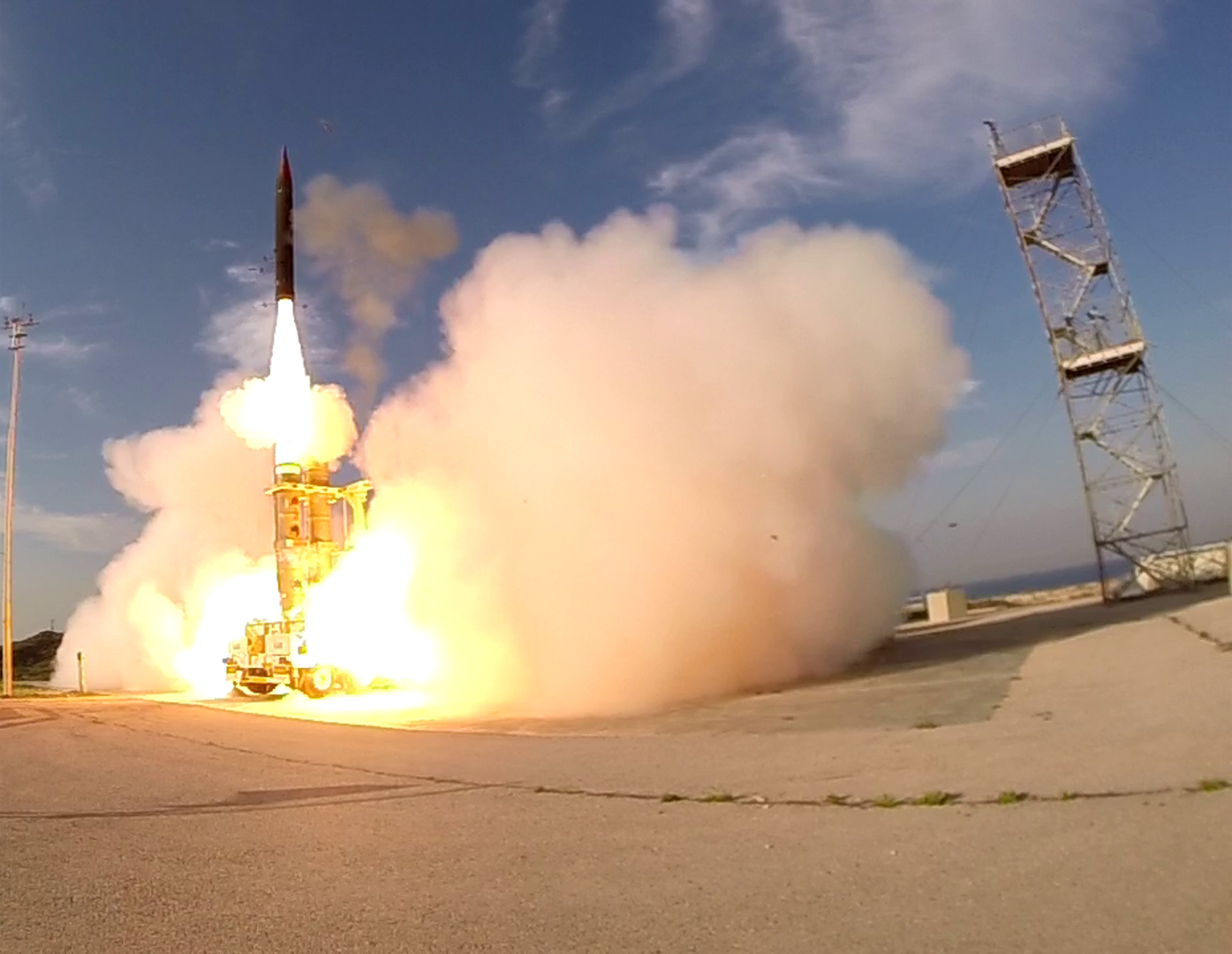
Arrow 3 in testing.

The Arrow 3 system is capable of exo-atmosphere interception of ballistic missiles, including ICBMs. It also acts as an anti-satellite weapon.

Lieutenant General Patrick J. O'Reilly, Director of the US Missile Defense Agency, said: "The design of Arrow 3 promises to be an extremely capable system, more advanced than what we have ever attempted in the US with our programs."

On 10 December 2015 Arrow 3 scored its first intercept in a complex test designed to validate how the system can detect, identify, track and then discriminate real from decoy targets delivered into space by an improved Silver Sparrow target missile. According to officials, the milestone test paves the way toward low-rate initial production of the Arrow 3.

==== David’s sling ====
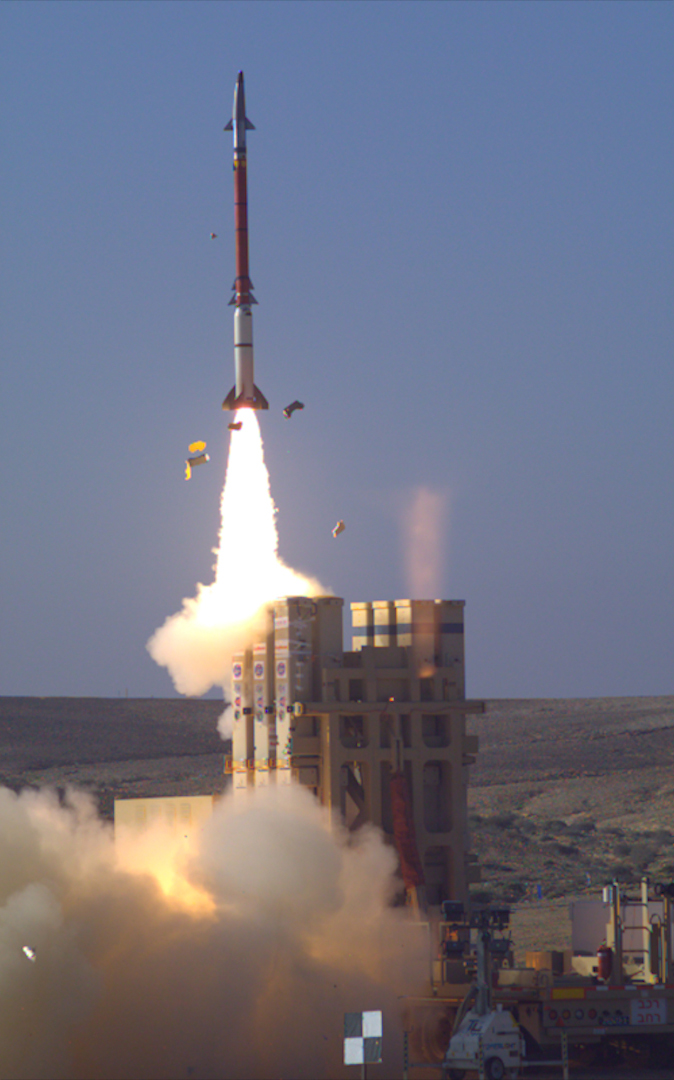
Israel's David's Sling, designed to intercept tactical ballistic missiles

David's Sling (Hebrew: קלע דוד), also sometimes called Magic Wand (Hebrew: שרביט קסמים), is an Israel Defense Forces military system being jointly developed by the Israeli defense contractor Rafael Advanced Defense Systems and the American defense contractor Raytheon, designed to intercept tactical ballistic missiles, as well as medium- to long-range rockets and slower-flying cruise missiles, such as those possessed by Hezbollah, fired at ranges from 40 to 300 km (20 to 190 mi). It is designed with the aim of intercepting the newest generation of tactical ballistic missiles, such as Iskander.

=== Japan ===
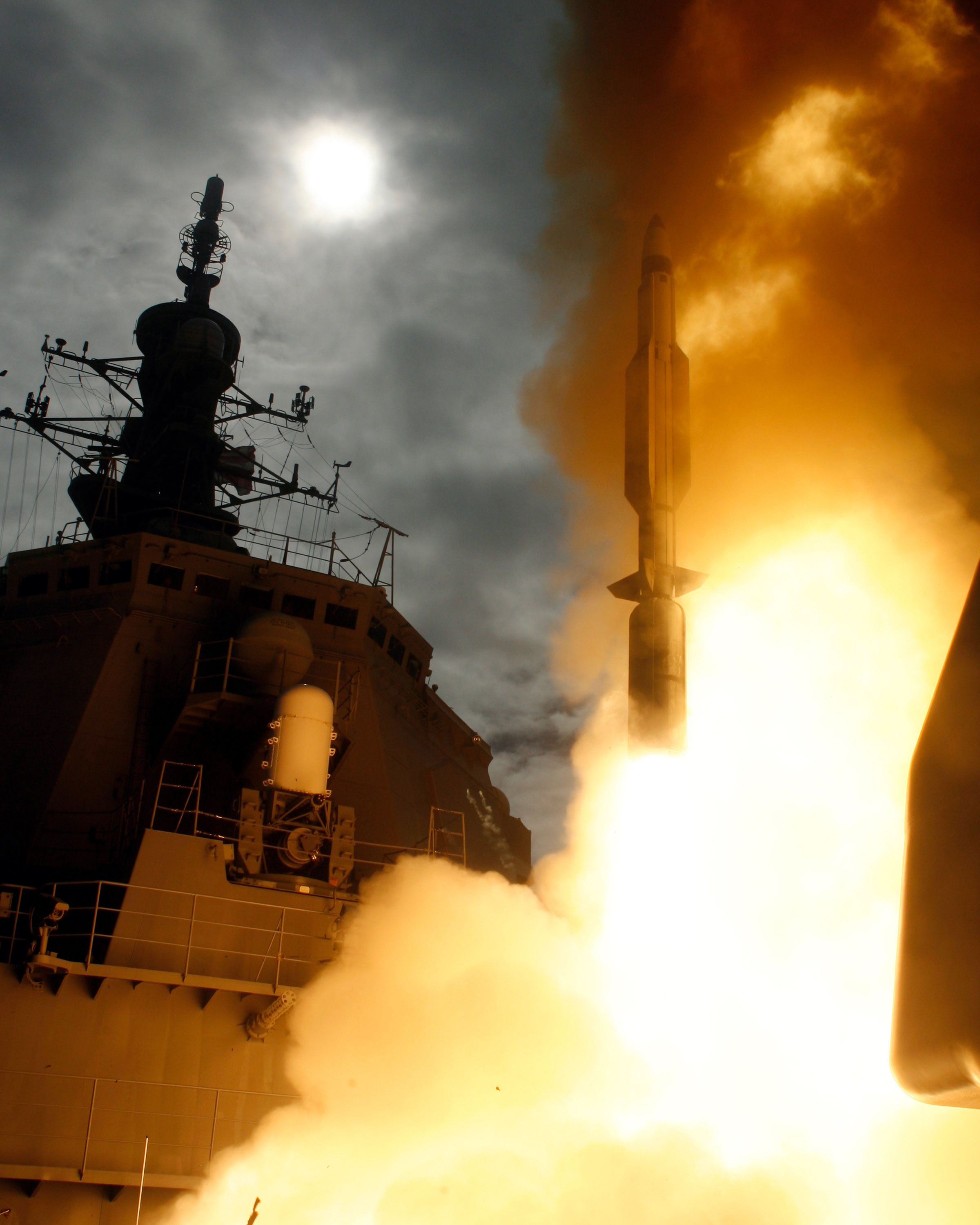
Japanese guided missile destroyer JDS Kongō firing a Standard Missile 3 anti-ballistic missile.

Since 1998, when North Korea launched a Taepodong-1 missile over northern Japan, the Japanese have been jointly developing a new surface-to-air interceptor known as the Patriot Advanced Capability 3 (PAC-3) with the US. Tests have been successful, and there are 11 locations that are planned for the PAC-3 to be installed. The approximate locations are near major air bases, like Kadena Air Base, and ammunition storage centers of the Japanese military. The exact location are not known to the public. A military spokesman said that tests had been done on two sites, one of them a business park in central Tokyo, and Ichigaya – a site not far from the Imperial Palace. Along with the PAC-3, Japan has installed a US-developed ship-based anti-ballistic missile system, which was tested successfully on 18 December 2007. Japan has 4 destroyers of this type capable of carrying RIM-161 Standard Missile 3 and equipped with the Aegis Ballistic Missile Defense System. Japan is currently modifying another 4 destroyers so that they can take part of their defense force against ballistic missiles, bringing the total number to 8 ships.

=== South Korea ===
Since North Korea started developing its nuclear weapon program, South Korea has been under imminent danger. South Korea started its BDM program by acquiring 8 batteries of the MIM-104 Patriot (PAC-2) missiles from the United States. The PAC-2 was developed to destroy incoming aircraft and is now unreliable in defending a ballistic missile attack from North Korea, as they have developed further their nuclear program. As of 2018, South Korea decided to improve its defense system by upgrading to the PAC-3, which has a hit-to-kill capability against incoming missiles. The main reason that the South Korean anti-ballistic defense system is not very developed is because they have tried to develop their own, without help from other countries, since the beginning of the 1990s. The South Korean Defense Acquisition Program Administration (DAPA) has confirmed that it has test launched the L-SAM system in February 2022. This particular missile has been in development since 2019 and is South Korea's next anti-ballistic missile generation. It is expected to have a range of 150 km (90 mi) and be able to intercept targets between 40 and 100 km (25 and 62 mi) of altitude, and it can also be used as an aircraft interceptor. The L-SAM system is expected to be complete and ready to use in 2024.

=== Soviet Union/Russian Federation ===
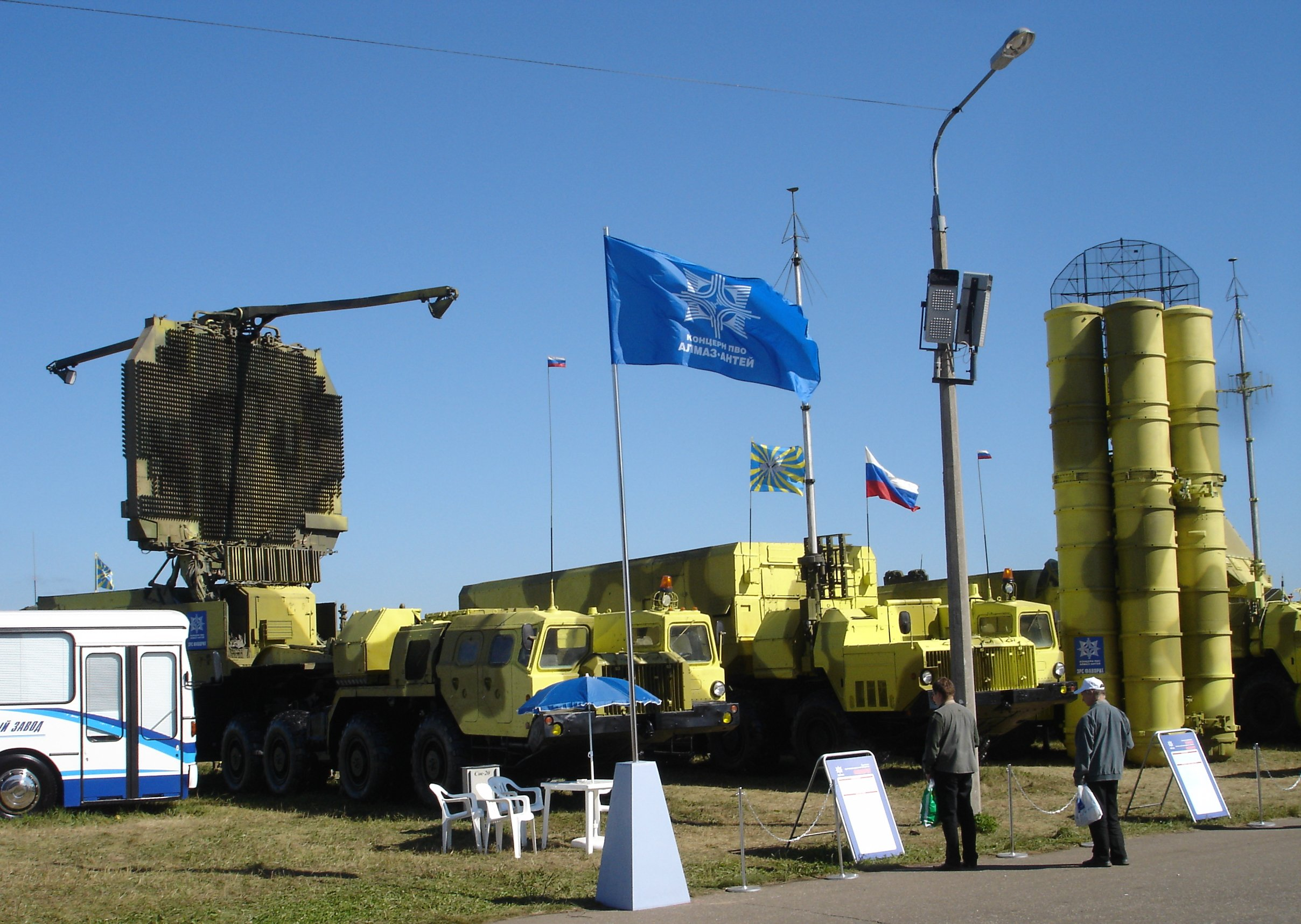
S-300PMU-2 vehicles. From left to right: 64N6E2 detection radar, 54K6E2 command post and 5P85 TEL.

The Moscow ABM defense system was designed with the aim of being able to intercept the ICBM warheads aimed at Moscow and other important industrial regions, and is based on:

- A-35 Aldan
  - ABM-1 Galosh / 5V61 (decommissioned)
- A-35M
  - ABM-1B (decommissioned)
- A-135 Amur
  - ABM-3 Gazelle / 53T6
  - ABM-4 Gorgon / 51T6 (decommissioned)
- A–235 Nudol (In development)
- S-300P (SA-10)
- S-300V/V4 (SA-12)
- S-300PMU-1/2 (SA-20)
- S-400 (SA-21)
- S-300VM (SA-23)
- S-500 Prometey (serial production began in 2021)

=== Taiwan ===
Procurement of MIM-104 Patriot and indigenous Tien-Kung anti-ballistic missile systems. With the tense situations with China, Taiwan developed the Sky Bow (or Tien-Kung), this surface-to-air missile can intercept and destroy enemy aircraft and ballistic missiles. These system was created in partnership with Raytheon Technologies, using Lockheed Martin ADAR-HP as inspiration to create the Chang Bai S-band radar system. The missiles have a range of 200 km (120 mi) and was designed to take on fast moving vehicles with low radar cross-section. The latest variant of this system is the Sky Bow III (TK-3). The high-altitude Chiang Kung system was rolled out in 2025.

=== United States ===
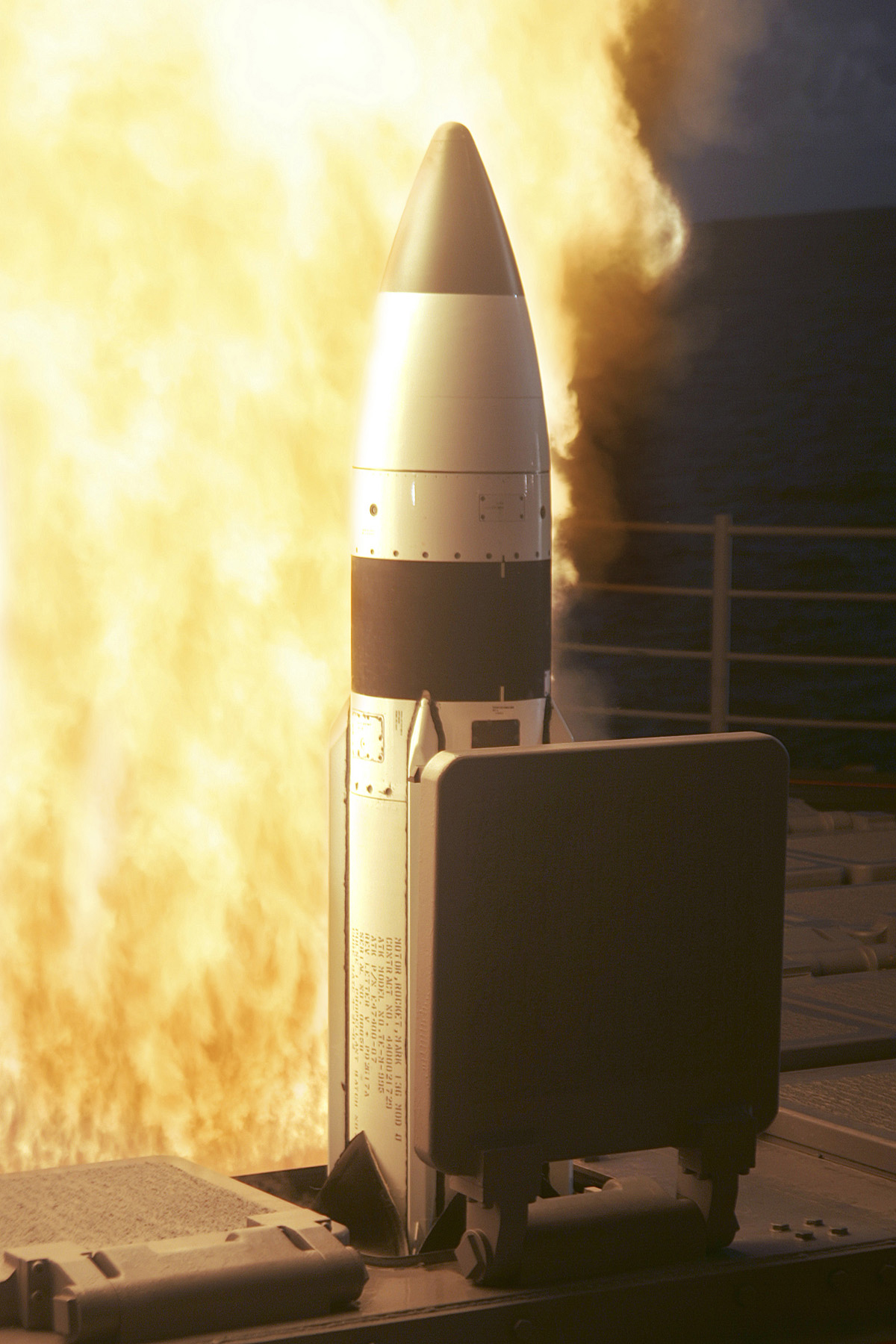
United States Navy RIM-161 Standard Missile 3 anti-ballistic missile.

In several tests, the US military have demonstrated the feasibility of destroying long and short range ballistic missiles. Combat effectiveness of newer systems against 1950s tactical ballistic missiles seems very high, as the MIM-104 Patriot (PAC-1 and PAC-2) had a 100% success rate in Operation Iraqi Freedom.

The US Navy Aegis Ballistic Missile Defense System (Aegis BMD) uses RIM-161 Standard Missile 3, which hits a target going faster than ICBM warheads. On 16 November 2020 an SM-3 Block IIA interceptor successfully destroyed an ICBM in mid-course, under Link-16 Command and Control, Battle Management, and Communications (C2BMC).

The US Army Terminal High Altitude Area Defense (THAAD) system began production in 2008. Its stated range as a short to intermediate ballistic missile interceptor means that it is not designed to hit midcourse ICBMs, which can reach terminal phase speeds of mach 8 or greater. The THAAD interceptor has a reported maximum speed of mach 8, and THAAD has repeatedly proven it can intercept descending exoatmospheric missiles in a ballistic trajectory.

The US Army Ground-Based Midcourse Defense (GMD) system was developed by the Missile Defense Agency. It combines ground-based AN/FPS-132 Upgraded Early Warning Radar installations and mobile AN/TPY-2 X-band radars with 44 exoatmospheric interceptors stationed in underground silos around California and Alaska, to protect against low-count ICBM attacks from rogue states. Each Ground-Based Interceptor (GBI) rocket carries an Exoatmospheric Kill Vehicle (EKV) kinetic kill interceptor, with 97% probability of intercept when four interceptors are launched at the target.

Since 2004, the United States Army plans to replace Raytheon's Patriot missile (SAM) engagement control station (ECS), along with seven other forms of ABM defense command systems, with Integrated Air and Missile Defense Battle Command System (IBCS) designed to shoot down short, medium, and intermediate range ballistic missiles in their terminal phase by intercepting with a hit-to-kill approach. Northrop Grumman was selected as the prime contractor in 2010; the Army spent $2.7 billion on the program between 2009 and 2020. IBCS engagement stations will support identification and tracking of targets using sensor fusion from disparate data streams, and selection of appropriate kill vehicles from available launcher systems. In February 2022 THAAD radar and TFCC (THAAD Fire Control & Communication) demonstrated their interoperability with Patriot PAC-3 MSE missile launchers, engaging targets using both THAAD and Patriot interceptors.

== History ==
=== 1940s and 1950s ===
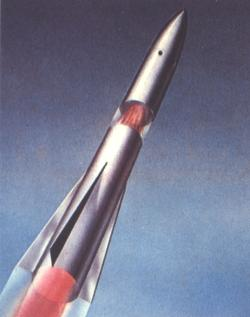
1946 Project Wizard missile

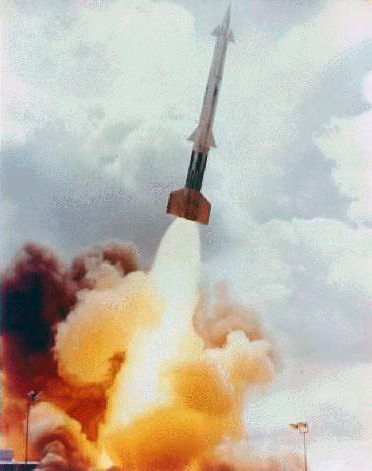
Launch of a US Army Nike Zeus missile, the first ABM system to enter widespread testing.

The idea of destroying rockets before they can hit their target dates from the first use of modern missiles in warfare, the German V-1 and V-2 program of World War II.

British fighters destroyed some V-1 "buzz bombs" in flight, although concentrated barrages of heavy anti-aircraft artillery had greater success. Under the lend-lease program, 200 US 90 mm AA guns with SCR-584 radars and Western Electric/Bell Labs computers were sent to the UK. These demonstrated a 95% success rate against V-1s that flew into their range.

The V-2, the first true ballistic missile, has no known record of being destroyed in the air. SCR-584's could be used to plot the trajectories of the missiles and provide some warning, but were more useful in backtracking their ballistic trajectory and determining the rough launch locations. The Allies launched Operation Crossbow to find and destroy V-2s before launch, but these operations were largely ineffective. In one instance a Spitfire happened upon a V-2 rising through the trees, and fired on it with no effect. This led to allied efforts to capture launching sites in Belgium and the Netherlands.

A wartime study by Bell Labs into the task of shooting down ballistic missiles in flight concluded it was not possible. In order to intercept a missile, one needs to be able to steer the attack onto the missile before it hits. A V-2's speed would require guns of effectively instantaneous reaction time, or some sort of weapon with ranges on the order of dozens of miles, neither of which appeared possible. This was, however, just before the emergence of high-speed computing systems. By the mid-1950s, things had changed considerably, and many forces worldwide were considering ABM systems.

The American armed forces began experimenting with anti-missile missiles soon after World War II, as the extent of German research into rocketry became clear. Project Wizard began in 1946, with the aim of creating a missile capable of intercepting the V-2.

But defences against Soviet long-range bombers took priority until 1957, when the Soviet Union demonstrated its advances in ICBM technology with the launch of Sputnik, the Earth's first artificial satellite. The US Army accelerated development of their LIM-49 Nike Zeus system in response. Zeus was criticized throughout its development program, especially from those within the US Air Force and nuclear weapons establishments who suggested it would be much simpler to build more nuclear warheads and guarantee mutually assured destruction. Zeus was eventually cancelled in 1963.

In 1958, the US sought to explore whether airbursting nuclear weapons might be used to ward off ICBMs. It conducted several test explosions of low-yield nuclear weapons – 1.7 kt boosted fission W25 warheads – launched from ships to very high altitudes over the southern Atlantic Ocean. Such an explosion releases a burst of X-rays in the Earth's atmosphere, causing secondary showers of charged particles over an area hundreds of miles across. These can become trapped in the Earth' magnetic field, creating an artificial radiation belt. It was believed that this might be strong enough to damage warheads traveling through the layer. This proved not to be the case, but Argus returned key data about a related effect, the nuclear electromagnetic pulse (NEMP).

=== Canada ===
Other countries were also involved in early ABM research. A more advanced project was at CARDE in Canada, which researched the main problems of ABM systems. A key problem with any radar system is that the signal is in the form of a cone, which spreads with distance from the transmitter. For long-distance interceptions like ABM systems, the inherent inaccuracy of the radar makes an interception difficult. CARDE considered using a terminal guidance system to address the accuracy concerns, and developed several advanced infrared detectors for this role. They also studied a number of missile airframe designs, a new and much more powerful solid rocket fuel, and numerous systems for testing it all. After a series of drastic budget reductions during the late 1950s the research ended. One offshoot of the project was Gerald Bull's system for inexpensive high-speed testing, consisting of missile airframes shot from a sabot round, which would later be the basis of Project HARP. Another was the CRV7 and Black Brant rockets, which used the new solid rocket fuel.

=== Soviet Union ===
V-1000

The Soviet military had requested funding for ABM research as early as 1953, but were only given the go-ahead to begin deployment of such a system on 17 August 1956. Their test system, known simply as System A, was based on the V-1000 missile, which was similar to the early US efforts. The first successful test interception was carried out on 24 November 1960, and the first with a live warhead on 4 March 1961. In this test, a dummy warhead was released by a R-12 ballistic missile launched from the Kapustin Yar, and intercepted by a V-1000 launched from Sary-Shagan. The dummy warhead was destroyed by the impact of 16,000 tungsten-carbide spherical impactors 140 seconds after launch, at an altitude of 25 km (82,000 ft).

The V-1000 missile system was nonetheless considered not reliable enough and abandoned in favour of nuclear-armed ABMs. Retired V-1000 was used to develop 1Ya2TA sounding rocket, capable of launching 520 kg (1,150 lb) scientific payload to an altitude of 400 km (250 mi). A much larger missile, the Fakel 5V61 (known in the west as Galosh), was developed to carry the larger warhead and carry it much further from the launch site. Further development continued, and the A-35 anti-ballistic missile system, designed to protect Moscow, became operational in 1971. A-35 was designed for exoatmospheric interceptions, and would have been highly susceptible to a well-arranged attack using multiple warheads and radar black-out techniques.

A-35 was upgraded during the 1980s to a two-layer system, the A-135. The Gorgon (SH-11/ABM-4) long-range missile was designed to handle intercepts outside the atmosphere, and the Gazelle (SH-08/ABM-3) short-range missile endoatmospheric intercepts that eluded Gorgon.

=== American Nike-X and Sentinel ===
Nike Zeus failed to be a credible defense in an era of rapidly increasing ICBM counts due to its ability to attack only one target at a time. Additionally, significant concerns about its ability to successfully intercept warheads in the presence of high-altitude nuclear explosions, including its own, lead to the conclusion that the system would simply be too costly for the very low amount of protection it could provide.

By the time it was cancelled in 1963, potential upgrades had been explored for some time. Among these were radars capable of scanning much greater volumes of space and able to track many warheads and launch several missiles at once. These, however, did not address the problems identified with radar blackouts caused by high-altitude explosions. To address this need, a new missile with extreme performance was designed to attack incoming warheads at much lower altitudes, as low as 20 km (66,000 ft). The new project encompassing all of these upgrades was launched as Nike-X.

The main missile was LIM-49 Spartan—a Nike Zeus upgraded for longer range and a much larger 5 megaton warhead intended to destroy enemy's warheads with a burst of x-rays outside the atmosphere. A second shorter-range missile called Sprint with very high acceleration was added to handle warheads that evaded longer-ranged Spartan. Sprint was a very fast missile (some sources claimed it accelerated to 13,000 km/h (8,000 mph) within 4 seconds of flight, an average acceleration of 90 g) and had a smaller W66 enhanced radiation warhead in the 1 to 3 kiloton range for in-atmosphere interceptions.

ABM systems also became a subject of superpower diplomacy in this period. At the Glassboro Summit Conference on 23 June 1967, President Johnson and Defense Secretary Robert McNamara discussed the relationship between strategic defenses and offensive arsenals with Soviet Premier Alexei Kosygin, and the United States proposed adopting strict limits on strategic ABM systems. Kosygin rejected the proposal. Five years later, the ABM Treaty of 1972 placed the first binding limits on such systems.

The experimental success of Nike X persuaded the Lyndon B. Johnson administration to propose a thin ABM defense, that could provide almost complete coverage of the United States. In a September 1967 speech, Defense Secretary Robert McNamara referred to it as "Sentinel". McNamara, a private ABM opponent because of cost and feasibility (see cost-exchange ratio), claimed that Sentinel would be directed not against the Soviet Union's missiles (since the USSR had more than enough missiles to overwhelm any American defense), but rather against the potential nuclear threat of the People's Republic of China.

In the meantime, a public debate over the merit of ABMs began. Difficulties that had already made an ABM system questionable for defending against an all-out attack. One problem was the Fractional Orbital Bombardment System (FOBS) that would give little warning to the defense. Another problem was high altitude EMP (whether from offensive or defensive nuclear warheads) which could degrade defensive radar systems.

When this proved infeasible for economic reasons, a much smaller deployment using the same systems was proposed, namely Safeguard (described later).

=== Defense against MIRVs ===
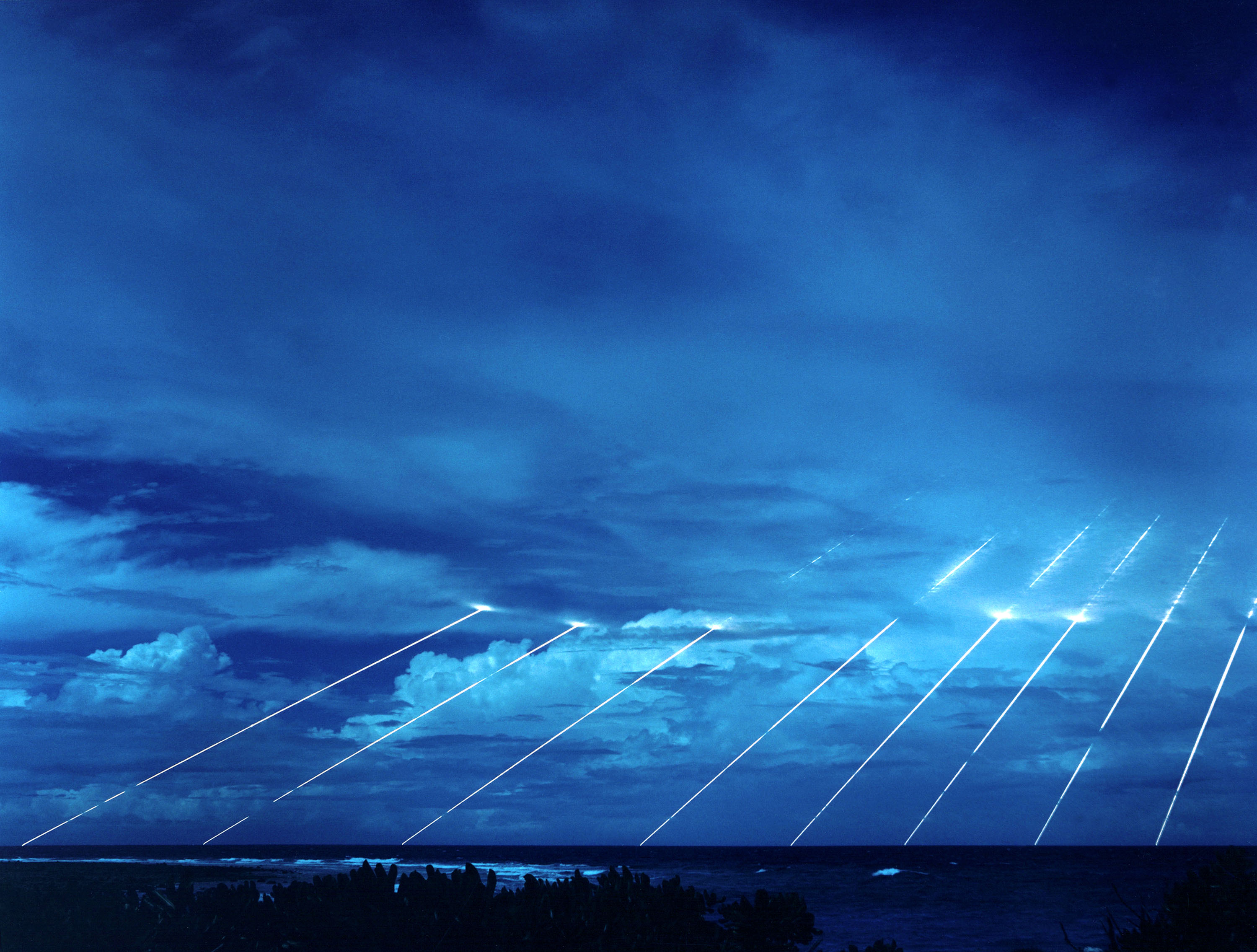
Testing of the LGM-118A Peacekeeper re-entry vehicles, all eight shot from only one missile. Each line is the path of a warhead which, were it live, would detonate with the explosive power of twenty-five Hiroshima-style weapons.

ABM systems were developed initially to counter single warheads launched from large intercontinental ballistic missiles (ICBMs). The economics seemed simple enough; since rocket costs increase rapidly with size, the price of the ICBM launching a large warhead should always be greater than the much smaller interceptor missile needed to destroy it. In an arms race the defense would always win.

In addition to the blast effect, the detonation of nuclear devices against attacking intercontinental ballistic missiles produces a neutron kill effect from the strong radiation emitted, and this neutralizes the warhead, or warheads, of the attacking missile. Most ABM devices depend on neutron kill for their effectiveness.

In practice, the price of the interceptor missile was considerable, due to its sophistication. The system had to be guided all the way to an interception, which demanded guidance and control systems that worked within and outside the atmosphere. Due to their relatively short ranges, an ABM missile would be needed to counter an ICBM wherever it might be aimed. That implies that dozens of interceptors are needed for every ICBM since warhead's targets couldn't be known in advance. This led to intense debates about the "cost-exchange ratio" between interceptors and warheads.

Conditions changed dramatically in 1970 with the introduction of multiple independently targetable reentry vehicle (MIRV) warheads. Suddenly, each launcher was throwing not one warhead, but several. These would spread out in space, ensuring that a single interceptor would be needed for each warhead. This simply added to the need to have several interceptors for each warhead in order to provide geographical coverage. Now it was clear that an ABM system would always be many times more expensive than the ICBMs they defended against.

=== Anti-Ballistic Missile Treaty of 1972 ===
Technical, economic and political problems described resulted in the ABM treaty of 1972, which restricted the deployment of strategic (not tactical) anti-ballistic missiles.

By the ABM treaty and a 1974 revision, each country was allowed to deploy a mere 100 ABMs to protect a single, small area. The Soviets retained their Moscow defences. The US designated their ICBM sites near Grand Forks Air Force Base, North Dakota, where Safeguard was already under advanced development. The radar systems and anti-ballistic missiles were approximately 90 miles north/northwest of Grand Forks AFB, near Concrete, North Dakota. The missiles were deactivated in 1975. The main radar site (PARCS) is still used as an early warning ICBM radar, facing relative north. It is located at Cavalier Air Force Station, North Dakota.

=== Brief use of Safeguard in 1975/1976 ===
The US Safeguard system, which utilized the nuclear-tipped LIM-49A Spartan and Sprint missiles, in the short operational period of 1975/1976, was the second counter-ICBMs system in the world. Safeguard protected only the main fields of US ICBMs from attack, theoretically ensuring that an attack could be responded to with a US launch, enforcing the mutually assured destruction principle.

=== SDI experiments in the 1980s ===
The Reagan-era Strategic Defense Initiative (often referred to as "Star Wars"), along with research into various energy-beam weaponry, brought new interest in the area of ABM technologies.

SDI was an extremely ambitious program to provide a total shield against a massive Soviet ICBM attack. The initial concept envisioned large sophisticated orbiting laser battle stations, space-based relay mirrors, and nuclear-pumped X-ray laser satellites. Later research indicated that some planned technologies such as X-ray lasers were not feasible with then-current technology. As research continued, SDI evolved through various concepts as designers struggled with the difficulty of such a large complex defense system. SDI remained a research program and was never deployed. Several post-SDI technologies are used by the present Missile Defense Agency (MDA).

Lasers originally developed for the SDI plan are in use for astronomical observations. Used to ionize gas in the upper atmosphere, they provide telescope operators with a target to calibrate their instruments.

=== Tactical ABMs deployed in 1990s ===
The Israeli Arrow missile system was tested initially during 1990, before the first Gulf War. The Arrow was supported by the United States throughout the 1990s.

The Patriot was the first deployed tactical ABM system, although it was not designed from the outset for that task and consequently had limitations. It was used during the 1991 Gulf War to attempt to intercept Iraqi Scud missiles. Post-war analyses show that the Patriot was much less effective than initially thought because of its radar and control system's inability to discriminate warheads from other objects when the Scud missiles broke up during reentry.

Testing ABM technology continued during the 1990s with mixed success. After the Gulf War, improvements were made to several US air defense systems. A new Patriot, PAC-3, was developed and tested—a complete redesign of the PAC-2 deployed during the war, including a totally new missile. The improved guidance, radar and missile performance improves the probability of kill over the earlier PAC-2. During Operation Iraqi Freedom, Patriot batteries engaged 100% of enemy TBMs within their engagement territory. Of these engagements, 8 of them were verified as kills by multiple independent sensors; the remaining was listed as a probable kill due to lack of independent verification. Patriot was involved in three friendly fire incidents: two incidents of Patriot shootings at coalition aircraft and one of US aircraft shooting at a Patriot battery.

A new version of the Hawk missile was tested during the early to mid-1990s and by the end of 1998 the majority of US Marine Corps Hawk systems were modified to support basic theater anti-ballistic missile capabilities. The MIM-23 Hawk missile is not operational in US service since 2002, but is used by many other countries.

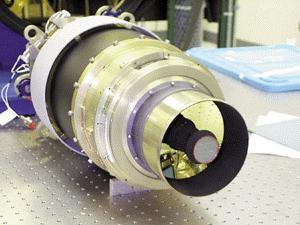
Developed in the late 1990s, the Lightweight Exo-Atmospheric Projectile attaches to a modified SM-2 Block IV missile used by the US Navy

Soon after the Gulf War, the Aegis Combat System was expanded to include ABM capabilities. The Standard missile system was also enhanced and tested for ballistic missile interception. During the late 1990s, SM-2 block IVA missiles were tested in a theater ballistic missile defense function. Standard Missile 3 (SM-3) systems have also been tested for an ABM role. In 2008, an SM-3 missile launched from the Ticonderoga-class cruiser USS Lake Erie, successfully intercepted a non-functioning satellite.

=== Brilliant Pebbles concept ===
Approved for acquisition by the Pentagon during 1991 but never realized, Brilliant Pebbles was a proposed space-based anti-ballistic system that was meant to avoid some of the problems of the earlier SDI concepts. Rather than use sophisticated large laser battle stations and nuclear-pumped X-ray laser satellites, Brilliant Pebbles consisted of a thousand very small, intelligent orbiting satellites with kinetic warheads. The system relied on improvements of computer technology, avoided problems with overly centralized command and control and risky, expensive development of large, complicated space defense satellites. It promised to be much less expensive to develop and have less technical development risk.

The name Brilliant Pebbles comes from the small size of the satellite interceptors and great computational power enabling more autonomous targeting. Rather than rely exclusively on ground-based control, the many small interceptors would cooperatively communicate among themselves and target a large swarm of ICBM warheads in space or in the late boost phase. Development was discontinued later in favor of a limited ground-based defense.

=== Transformation of SDI into MDA, development of NMD/GMD ===
While the Reagan era Strategic Defense Initiative was intended to shield against a massive Soviet attack, during the early 1990s, President George H. W. Bush called for a more limited version using rocket-launched interceptors based on the ground at a single site. Such system was developed since 1992, was expected to become operational in 2010 and capable of intercepting small number of incoming ICBMs. First called the National Missile Defense (NMD), since 2002 it was renamed Ground-Based Midcourse Defense (GMD). It was planned to protect all 50 states from a rogue missile attack. The Alaska site provides more protection against North Korean missiles or accidental launches from Russia or China, but is likely less effective against missiles launched from the Middle East. The Alaska interceptors may be augmented later by the naval Aegis Ballistic Missile Defense System or by ground-based missiles in other locations.

During 1998, Defense Secretary William Cohen proposed spending an additional $6.6 billion on intercontinental ballistic missile defense programs to build a system to protect against attacks from North Korea or accidental launches from Russia or China.

In terms of organization, during 1993 SDI was reorganized as the Ballistic Missile Defense Organization. In 2002, it was renamed to Missile Defense Agency (MDA).

=== 21st century ===
On 13 June 2002, the United States withdrew from the Anti-Ballistic Missile Treaty and recommenced developing missile defense systems that would have formerly been prohibited by the bilateral treaty. The action was stated as needed to defend against the possibility of a missile attack conducted by a rogue state. The next day, the Russian Federation dropped the START II agreement, intended to completely ban MIRVs.

The Lisbon Summit of 2010 saw the adoption of a NATO program that was formed in response to the threat of a rapid increase of ballistic missiles from potentially unfriendly regimes, though no specific region, state, or country was formally mentioned. This adoption came from the recognition of territorial missile defense as a core alliance objective. At this time, Iran was seen as the likely aggressor that eventually led to the adoption of this ABM system, as Iran has the largest missile arsenal of the Middle East, as well as a space program. From this summit, NATO's ABM system was potentially seen as a threat by Russia, who felt that their ability to retaliate any perceived nuclear threats would be degraded. To combat this, Russia proposed that any ABM system enacted by NATO must be universal to operate, cover the entirety of the European continent, and not upset any nuclear parity. The United States actively sought NATO involvement in the creation of an ABM system, and saw an Iranian threat as a sufficient reason to warrant its creation. The United States also had plans to create missile defense facilities, but NATO officials feared that it would have provided protection to Europe, it would have detracted from the responsibility of NATO for collective defense. The officials also argued the potential prospect of U.S-commanded operation system that would work in conjunction with the Article 5 defense of NATO.

On 15 December 2016, the US Army SMDC had a successful test of a US Army Zombie Pathfinder rocket, to be used as a target for exercising various anti-ballistic missile scenarios. The rocket was launched as part of NASA's sounding rocket program, at White Sands Missile Range.

In November 2020, the US successfully destroyed a dummy ICBM. The ICBM was launched from Kwajalein Atoll in the general direction of Hawaii, triggering a satellite warning to a Colorado Air Force base, which then contacted the USS John Finn. The ship launched a SM-3 Block IIA missile to destroy the US dummy, still outside the atmosphere.

== See also ==
- Comparison of anti-ballistic missile systems
- Atmospheric entry
- Kinetic kill vehicle
- Missile defense
- Anti-torpedo torpedoes
- Multiple Kill Vehicle
- Nuclear disarmament
- Nuclear proliferation
- Nuclear warfare
- Intercontinental ballistic missile

== Sources ==
- Richter, Alexander; Tom, Makena; Sharma, Satyam; Long, Rowan (May 2026). "The evolution of China's ballistic missile defense". Journal of Strategic Studies. Taylor & Francis Online. doi:10.1080/01402390.2026.2665626.
