= Dong Neng-3 =

Chinese ballistic missile defense system

The Dong Neng-3 (Chinese: 动能-3; lit. 'Kinetic Energy-3'; DN-3/KO09) is a Chinese ballistic missile defense system.

== Design ==
The system is generally believed to be based on the DF-21 with elements of the SC-19 also incorporated.

The interceptor is hit-to-kill. It can also be used as an anti-satellite weapon.

The Dong Neng-3 is believed to fill much the same role as the SM-3 however it is believed to be much larger.

== History ==
Testing of the DN-3 has primarily occurred at the Korla Missile Test Complex.

A 2010 midcourse defense test was most likely a test of the DN-3.

In 2015 the DN-3’s anti-satellite capabilities are believed to have been tested.

In February 2018 the DN-3 was tested against a DF-21 based target in space. This test was reported to be a success by the PLA Daily.

== See also ==
- Dong Neng-2
- FJ ABM
- 2007 Chinese anti-satellite missile test
