= A-235 anti-ballistic missile system =

A-235 PL-19 Nudol
- Type: Anti-ballistic missile Anti-satellite missile
- Place of origin: Russia

Production history
- Designer: Almaz-Antey

System A-235 PL-19 Nudol (Russian: Система А-235 / ПЛ-19-181М / Нудоль) is a Russian hypersonic anti-ballistic missile and anti-satellite weapon system in development. It is designed to deflect a nuclear attack on Moscow and other regions within European Russia. The main developer of the system is JSC Concern VKO Almaz-Antey. The new system should replace the current one — A-135. The two main differences will be that the A-235 will use conventional warheads and it will be road-mobile.

According to reports in early 2018, the system will not be equipped with nuclear warheads. According to Russian sources, the system will be deployed at points surrounding Moscow by the end of 2018.

The new PRS-1M (45T6) is a modernized variant of the PRS-1 (53T6 Gazelle) and can use nuclear or conventional warheads. It can hit targets at ranges of 350 km and altitudes of 50 km.

The long-range missiles will most likely be equipped with nuclear warheads, while the others will have kinetic energy warheads. Testing of new missiles for the A-235 Samolyot-M system began in August 2014.

== Design ==
Initially, the A-235 missile defense system was planned to have three echelons: long-range echelon with a missile based on the A-925, the medium-range echelon was the updated 58R6 firing complex, and the short-range flight were the PRS-1M missiles (the result of the upgrade of the PRS-1 missiles).

== Tests ==
On 4 June 2019, the Russian Ministry of Defense posted a video showing the successful interception of the test target which was a test of a new anti-ballistic missile system in the form of a long-range surface to air missile. Though the nature of the air defense system which was being tested was not mentioned it has been widely speculated to have been a test of the S-500 Prometheus long-range surface to air missile system which entered early production earlier in the year. However, it also could have been a test of the A-235 anti-ballistic missile system for which tests have been conducted since 2014.

The anti-ballistic missile system was tested at Plesetsk Cosmodrome, on 15 April 2020, at the ex-launch site of the Tsyklon-2 rocket.

On 15 November 2021, the missile successfully destroyed the Kosmos 1408 satellite. The breakdown of the satellite caused space debris to form, which forced the crew of ISS to shelter. The debris passed every 93 minutes.

The latest test was conducted on 2 December 2022.

"Russia's latest S-550 missile systems will serve as a mobile follow-up of the A-135 'Amur' - A-235 'Nudol' strategic missile defense system.".

== See also ==
- S-550 missile system
- Ground-Based Midcourse Defense
- Comparison of anti-ballistic missile systems
