= Project 640 =

Chinese missile defense development programme

Project 640 was a missile defense development programme of the People's Republic of China that started in 1964. The programme pursued processes and technologies related to command and control, sensors, and weapons - including anti-ballistic missiles (ABM), lasers, and anti-satellite satellites. The goal of deploying or testing a complete system in the mid-1970s was unrealistic. Technical challenges, economic constraints and competing programmes slowed progress in the 1970s. Project 640 formally ended in 1982 without a system being developed.

Some areas of research, including anti-satellite weapons and lasers, continued under 863 Program which started in the late-1980s.

== History ==
In late-1963 and early-1964, Mao Zedong received reports on the use of missiles and lasers for missile defense. Mao voiced his approval for missile defence research in the "640" directive in February 1964; this was referenced by the project as 640. A high-level technical meeting in March 1964 chose ABMs as the preferred weapon. Project proposals and organizational changes proceeded into 1966. Development of a missile defence system was approved in August 1965, with testing targeted for 1973–1975; the designation Project 640 was assigned in March 1966. By early 1971, the first missile defence zone was to be installed at Beijing and Tianjin by 1974. A trial system installed at Tianjin for tests and simulations, with additional support coming from the 068 Base constructed as part of the Third Front in Changsha.

Progress was stymied by the lack of technical capability and disruption from the Cultural Revolution. No system was ever made; the ABMs remained under development through the late-1970s. Development slowed after 1974 as the programme was wound down. ABM development practically halted after 1978 when missile development priority shifted to the DF-5 intercontinental ballistic missile (ICBM) and submarine-launched ballistic missiles. Project 640 ended in 1982. Research on lasers and electromagnetic pulses continued elsewhere.

== Components ==
=== Missiles ===
ABM development was codenamed Project 640-1 and carried out by the Second Academy of the Seventh Ministry of Machine Building.

The first missile was the HQ-81 (simplified Chinese: 红旗-81; traditional Chinese: 紅旗-81; pinyin: Hóng Qí-81; lit. 'Red Banner-81'), later renamed to FJ-1 (Chinese: 反击-1; pinyin: Fǎn Jí-1; lit. 'Counter Attack-1'). The FJ-1 was designed to work with the 110 radar to intercept the warhead of a DF-3 ballistic missile at an altitude of 15 kilometers. Small-scale prototypes were launched in 1966. There were serious launch failures in 1972, and it was not until the late-1970s that satisfactory performance was achieved. By that time it was clearly obsolete and developed was stopped by early-1980.

The FJ-2 was a short-ranged missile designed as an alternative to the FJ-1. Development started in 1970 and cancelled in 1973. Six test launches of small-scale prototypes - five of which succeeded - were made from October 1971 to April 1972; 5 of 6 launches were successful.

The FJ-3 was intended to be a silo-launched three-stage solid fuel missile for intercepting targets at an altitude of hundreds of kilometers. It was to use the 715 guidance and the 7010 early warning radars. The FJ-3 was proposed in June 1971 and some work was carried out before being cancelled in 1977. The S-7 on-board computer designed for the FJ-3 was later used on the DF-5 ICBM.

The Second Academy worked on anti-satellite satellite development at the same time as the FJ-1.

=== Guns ===
Anti-missile supergun development was codenamed Project 640-2 and carried out by the 210th Institute of the 20th Academy of the General Logistics Department, under the supervision of the Second Academy of the Seventh Ministry of Machine Building.

From 1965 to 1968, subcaliber projectiles were test fired from smoothbore 85 mm and 140 mm guns; the latter's projectiles reached a height of 74 km. The 210th Institute also designed Pioneer, a 320 mm gun firing rocket or ramjet propelled subcaliber shells. Pioneer was 26 meters long and weighed 155 tons.

Advances in penetration aids led to interest shifting from unguided projectiles to gun-launched missiles from 1970. Contemporary material science and technical capability could not meet requirements and supergun development ended in 1978.

The research into the effects of high acceleration yielded some benefits. The 210th Institute and the 1410th Institute of the Ministry of Electronics Industry developed a gyroscope that could operate in 3000-5000 g; the device was used in other missiles. The research was also used to design parachutes for spacecraft during atmospheric entry.

=== Lasers ===
Anti-missile laser development was codenamed Project 640-3 and carried out by the Chinese Academy of Sciences's Shanghai Institute of Optics and Fine Mechanics (SIOM), which was founded in 1964 for laser research.

SIOM constructed a 120 mm laser with a maximum output of 320 kilojoules (kJ). Higher beam quality reduced the required energy to 30 kJ. Test firings were made against aluminium targets; an 80 mm target at 10 meters indoors, and a 0.2 mm target at 2 kilometers outdoors. Development was cancelled in 1976 due to insurmountable technical problems.

Support for laser development was reaffirmed in 1979 and was eventually continued as part of the 863 Program started in the late-1980s.

=== Radar ===
Radar development was codenamed Project 640-4 and carried out by the Fourth Ministry of Machine Building's 14th Electronics Research Institute in Nanjing. Project 640-4 produced the 7010 early warning and 110 tracking radars.

Development of the 7010 phased array radar was approved in early-1970. Constructed started in 1972, with the incomplete unit being used for testing, and was completed in 1976. The full array was 40 meters wide and 20 meters high, and had a range of 3000 kilometers. At least one 7010, built on a mountain side in Xuanhua at an elevation of 1600 meters, remained in service in 1999; it has been used for satellite tracking.

Development of the 110 monopulse precision tracking radar started in 1966. It was based on the 110 test radar from 1959. It entered service in 1977 enclosed within a 44-meter diameter radome.

=== Atmospheric entry ===
Research into the physics of atmospheric entry of warheads was codenamed Project 640-5.
