= HQ-29 =

Chinese anti-ballistic missile system

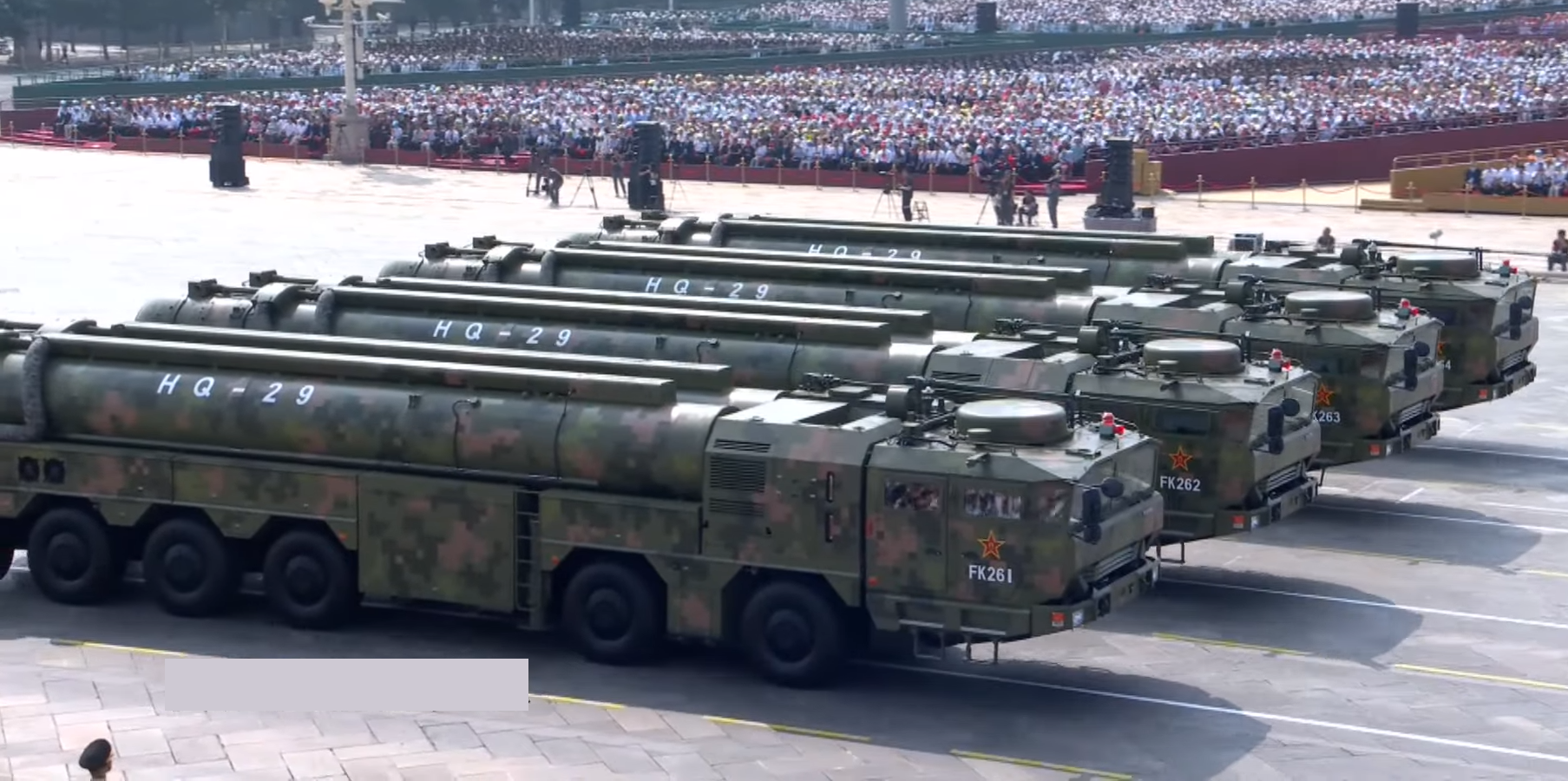
- HQ-29 at the 2025 China Victory Day Parade
- Type: Surface to air missile Anti-ballistic missile
- Place of origin: China

Service history
- In service: 2025 - present
- Used by: People's Liberation Army Air Force

Specifications
- Flight altitude: 100–2,000 km (62–1,243 mi)
- Launch platform: Transporter erector launcher

The HQ-29 (simplified Chinese: 红旗-29; traditional Chinese: 紅旗-29; pinyin: Hóng Qí-29; lit. 'Red Banner-29') is an anti-ballistic missile (ABM) developed by China.

== Description ==
The HQ-29 performs midcourse interceptions against ballistic missiles. According to Chinese sources, the HQ-29 can intercept intercontinental ballistic missiles (ICBM) above an altitude of 100 km or up to 2000 km, with an interception range of 4000 km against. Authoritative and official sources do not explicitly state that the missile can intercept ICBMs. The Independent reported that Chinese state media sources claim the HQ-29 has similar range to the American SM-3 Block IIA. The missile is road-mobile.

== History ==
The missile was deployed in 2025 likely as the top layer of China's ballistic missile defense system. Its first public appearance was during the 2025 China Victory Day Parade carried on transporter erector launchers.

== Sources ==
- Richter, Alexander; Tom, Makena; Sharma, Satyam; Long, Rowan (May 2026). "The evolution of China's ballistic missile defense". Journal of Strategic Studies. Taylor & Francis Online. doi:10.1080/01402390.2026.2665626.
