= RIM-161 Standard Missile 3 =

RIM-161 SM-3
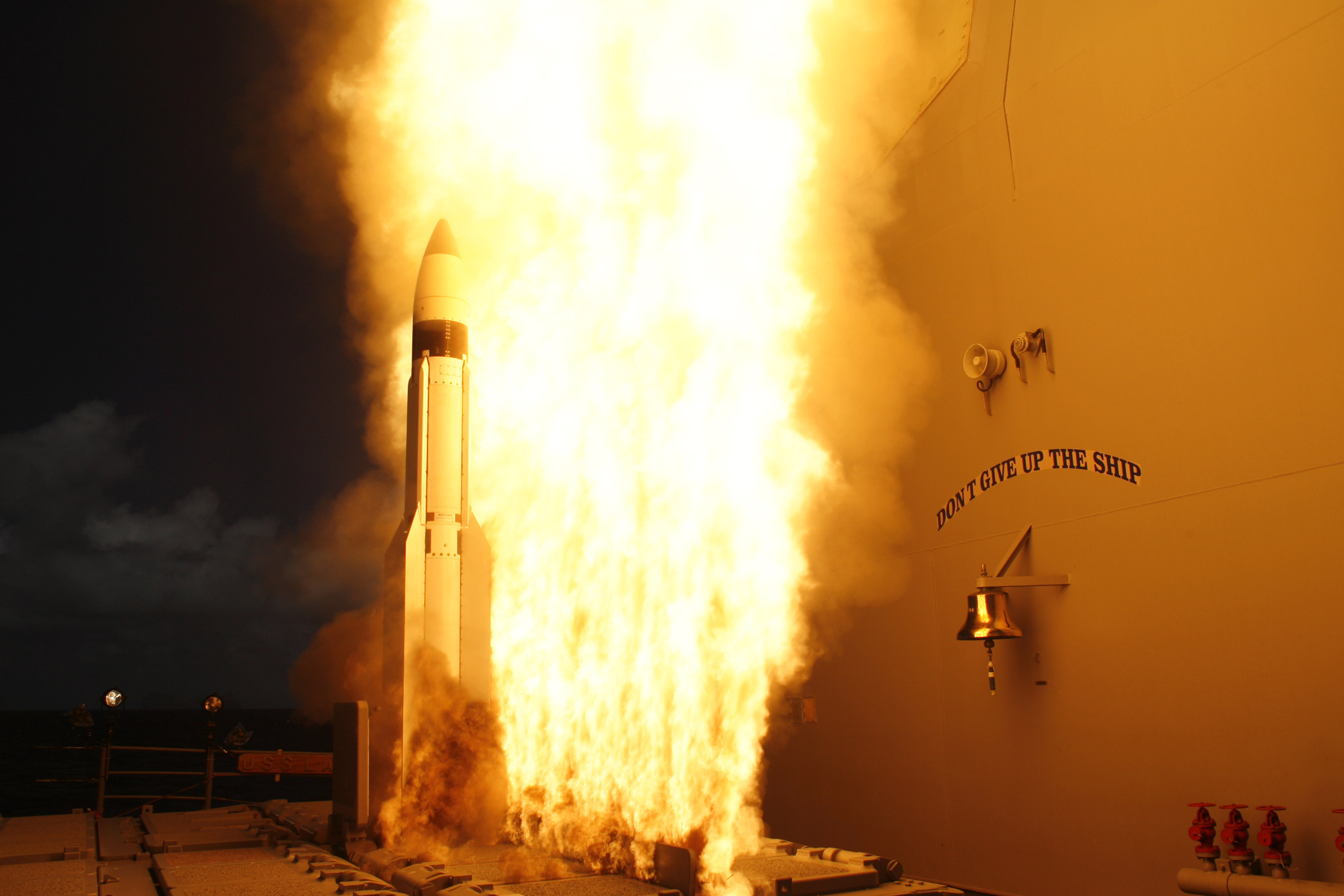
- A RIM-161 standard missile 3 (SM-3) is launched from the Aegis cruiser USS Lake Erie
- Type: Kinetic anti ballistic missile (Aegis Ballistic Missile Defense System)
- Place of origin: United States, Japan (Block IIA)

Service history
- In service: 2014–present (Block IB)
- Used by: United States Navy; Japan Maritime Self-Defense Force; Republic of Korea Navy; Aegis Ashore: Romania; Poland
- Wars: April 2024 Iranian strikes on Israel; 2026 Iran war

Production history
- Manufacturer: RTX, Aerojet, (Mitsubishi Heavy Industries Block IIA)
- Unit cost: US$9–25 million (2011); US$18.4m(FY2018); US$11.83m(FY2021)

Specifications
- Mass: 1.5 t
- Length: 6.55 m (21 ft 6 in)
- Diameter: 34.3 cm (13.5 in) for Block I missiles 53.3 cm (21.0 in) for Block II
- Wingspan: 1.57 m (62 in)
- Warhead: Lightweight Exo-Atmospheric Projectile (LEAP) kinetic warhead
- Propellant: Stage 1: Mk 72 booster, solid-fuel, Aerojet; Stage 2: MK 104 Dual Thrust Rocket Motor (DTRM), solid-fuel, Aerojet; Stage 3: MK 136 Third Stage Rocket Motor (TSRM), solid-fuel, ATK; Stage 4: Throttleable Divert and Attitude Control System (TDACS), Aerojet
- Operational range: Block IA/B: 900–1,200 km (560–750 mi); Block IIA: 1,200 km range and flight ceiling 900 – 1,050 km (depending on the type of target) (Note: Range and ceiling figures based on absolute 700s capability shown for Block IIA missile in Figure 4 at linked source—"Breaking Defense". Intercept capability against an SS-19 Stiletto launched from Kaliningrad against New York is shown as approximately 1,200 km range and 900 km ceiling for a North Sea intercept. Range and ceiling against a hypothetical Iranian ICBM launched against the same target is shown as approximately 1,200 km and 1,050 km respectively in Figure 3 of the same source for an intercept coming from Redzikowo, Poland.)
- Maximum speed: 3 km/s (Mach 8.8) Block IA/B; 4.5 km/s (Mach 13.2) Block IIA
- Guidance system: GPS/INS/semi-active radar homing/passive LWIR infrared homing seeker (KW)

The RIM-161 Standard Missile 3 (SM-3) is a ship-based surface-to-air missile used by the United States Navy to intercept ballistic missiles as a part of Aegis Ballistic Missile Defense System. With the Block IIA's range of 1,200 km, the SM-3 is the second longest-ranged anti-ballistic of the US Missile Defense Agency, behind the Ground-Based Interceptor. The SM-3 has also been employed in an anti-satellite capacity against a satellite at the lower end of low Earth orbit. The SM-3 is primarily used and tested by the United States Navy and also operated by the Japan Maritime Self-Defense Force.

All SM-3 variants are manufactured by Raytheon and Aerojet, while the Block IIA is developed jointly with Mitsubishi Heavy Industries. Target acquisition is provided by the ship's AN/SPY-1 radar, and the missile carries the Lightweight Exo-Atmospheric Projectile warhead.

In 2008, the US military destroyed its satellite USA-193, at an altitude of 247 kilometers, by firing an SM-3 from the USS Lake Erie near Hawaii, codenamed Operation Burnt Frost. The use of the missile was believed to be an anti-satellite weapon test in response to a similar 2007 test by China.

The SM-3 was first used in combat during the April 2024 Iranian strikes against Israel, when four to seven SM-3s were fired to intercept at least six Iranian ballistic missiles. The SM-3 was later used in the 2026 Iran war including to intercept Iranian ballistic missiles in Turkish airspace.

== Development ==
The SM-3 evolved from the proven SM-2 Block IV design. The SM-3 uses the same solid rocket booster and dual thrust rocket motor as the Block IV missile for the first and second stages and the same steering control section and midcourse missile guidance for maneuvering in the atmosphere. To support the extended range of an exo-atmospheric intercept, additional missile thrust is provided in a new third stage for the SM-3 missile, containing a dual pulse rocket motor for the early exo-atmospheric phase of flight.

Initial work to adapt SM-3 for land deployment ("Aegis ashore") was undertaken for Israel, but Israel chose to pursue development of the Arrow 3. A group in the Obama administration envisioned a European Phased Adaptive Approach (EPAA) and SM-3 was chosen as the main vector of this effort because the competing U.S. THAAD does not have enough range and would have required too many sites in Europe to provide adequate coverage. Compared to the GMD's Ground-Based Interceptor however, the SM-3 Block I has about 1/5 to 1/6 of the range. A significant improvement in this respect, the SM-3 Block II variant widens the missile's diameter from 0.34 to 0.53 m (13 to 21 in), making it more suitable against intermediate-range ballistic missiles and intercontinental ballistic missiles.

The highly modified Block IIA missile shares only the first-stage motor with the Block I. The Block IIA was "designed to allow for Japan to protect against a North Korean attack with fewer deployed ships" but it is also the key element of the EPAA phase 3 deployment in Europe. The Block IIA is being jointly developed by Raytheon and Mitsubishi Heavy Industries; the latter manages "the third-stage rocket motor and nose cone". The U.S. budgeted cost to date is $1.51 billion for the Block IIA.

On 15 October 2024, RTX announced that the SM-3 Block IIA entered full-rate production.

== Operation and performance ==
The ship's AN/SPY-1 radar finds the ballistic missile target and the Aegis weapon system calculates a fire-control solution. The Aerojet Mk 72 solid-fuel rocket booster launches the SM-3 from the ship's Mark 41 Vertical Launching System (VLS). After booster burnout, the booster separates and the Mk 104 dual-thrust rocket motor provides propulsion through the atmosphere. The missile receives midcourse guidance from the launching ship. The Mk 136 third-stage rocket motor then fires to carry the missile above the atmosphere, where required.

After the third stage separates, the Lightweight Exo-Atmospheric Projectile (LEAP) kinetic warhead searches for the target using pointing data from the launching ship. The throttleable divert and attitude control system allows the kinetic warhead to maneuver during the final phase of the engagement. The warhead's sensors identify the target and guide the interceptor to impact; according to Raytheon, an intercept releases about 130 megajoules (96,000,000 ft⋅lbf; 31 kilograms of TNT) of kinetic energy at the point of collision.

Independent assessments of early SM-3 testing before 2010 questioned the system's demonstrated success rate and the realism of some target engagements. The Missile Defense Agency disputed those conclusions, arguing that the studies included early developmental tests and did not reflect later operationally configured Aegis BMD and SM-3 testing.

Later SM-3 tests included both successes and failures. On 25 October 2012, an SM-3 Block IA failed to intercept a short-range ballistic missile target. In May 2013, an SM-3 Block IB intercepted a complex separating short-range ballistic missile target. On 4 October 2013, an SM-3 Block IB intercepted a medium-range ballistic missile target in what Raytheon described at the time as the highest-altitude SM-3 intercept to date.

The SM-3 Block IIA, developed jointly by the United States and Japan, began flight testing in 2015. Its first flight test, on 6 June 2015, evaluated missile functions including nosecone performance, steering control, and stage separation, but did not include an intercept attempt. On 3 February 2017, USS John Paul Jones used an SM-3 Block IIA to intercept a medium-range ballistic missile target. A later Block IIA test from the same ship failed on 21 June 2017 after a sailor mistakenly designated the target as friendly, causing the interceptor to self-destruct as designed. Another Block IIA test missed its target on 31 January 2018. On 26 October 2018, John Paul Jones detected, tracked, and destroyed a medium-range ballistic missile target with an SM-3 Block IIA launched from the Pacific Missile Range Facility at Kauaʻi, Hawaii.

On 16 November 2020, USS John Finn used an SM-3 Block IIA to intercept a simulated intercontinental ballistic missile (ICBM) target for the first time. The target was launched from the Ronald Reagan Ballistic Missile Defense Test Site on Kwajalein Atoll, and John Finn used off-board tracking data through the Command and Control Battle Management Communications network before launching the interceptor. The Navy described the event as a test of the feasibility of using SM-3 Block IIA as part of a layered homeland defense architecture, while noting that the missile had originally been designed for intermediate-range ballistic missile threats.

In February 2024, the Missile Defense Agency and the U.S. Navy conducted Flight Test Other-23, also called Stellar Sisyphus, off the coast of the Pacific Missile Range Facility. The test demonstrated Aegis tracking and discrimination against a medium-range ballistic missile target with countermeasures, followed by an SM-3 Block IIA intercept of the target. The Director, Operational Test and Evaluation reported that in fiscal year 2024 Aegis BMD demonstrated the ability to track, discriminate, engage, and intercept a medium-range ballistic missile target with countermeasures using an SM-3 Block IIA.

During the April 2024 Iranian strikes against Israel, the SM-3 was used in combat for the first time. The Director, Operational Test and Evaluation reported that two Aegis BMD destroyers successfully engaged Iranian ballistic missile threats targeting Israel with SM-3 Block IB missiles. USNI News reported that USS Arleigh Burke (DDG-51) and USS Carney (DDG-64), operating in the eastern Mediterranean, fired four to seven SM-3 interceptors at Iranian ballistic missiles. In the October 2024 Iranian strikes against Israel, two U.S. guided-missile destroyers again engaged Iranian missiles, using a combination of weapons that included SM-3 interceptors.

During the 2026 Iran war, U.S. Navy destroyers in the eastern Mediterranean were reported to have used SM-3 interceptors against Iranian ballistic missiles approaching or entering Turkish airspace. On 4 March 2026, Turkey said NATO air and missile defense assets in the eastern Mediterranean had intercepted an Iranian ballistic missile headed toward Turkish airspace; USNI News reported that the Pentagon did not identify the firing platform, while later reports identified USS Oscar Austin (DDG-79) as the destroyer involved. Reuters reported that NATO air defenses had shot down three ballistic missiles fired from Iran toward Turkey by 13 March 2026. Business Insider, citing a defense official, reported that U.S. Navy destroyers had used SM-3s three times to defend Turkish airspace since the start of U.S. and Israeli strikes on Iran. In May 2026, The Washington Post reported, based on Defense Department assessments described by U.S. officials, that U.S. naval vessels in the eastern Mediterranean had fired more than 100 SM-3 and SM-6 interceptors during hostilities with Iran.

== Variants ==
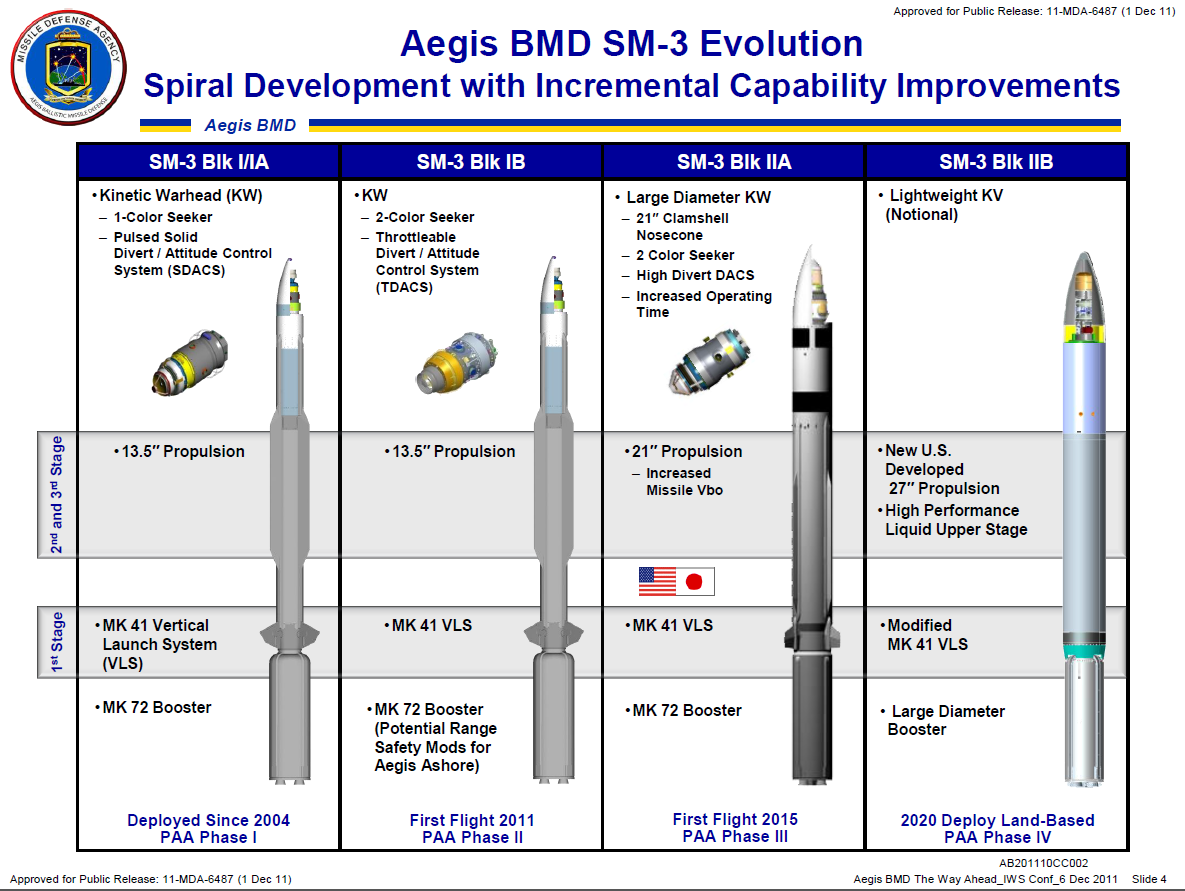
SM-3 evolution

The SM-3 block IA version provides an incremental upgrade to improve reliability and maintainability at a reduced cost.

The SM-3 block IB, due in 2010, offers upgrades which include an advanced two-color infrared seeker, and a 10-thruster solid throttling divert and attitude control system (TDACS/SDACS) on the kill vehicle to give it improved capability against maneuvering ballistic missiles or warheads. Solid TDACS is a joint Raytheon/Aerojet project, but Boeing supplies some components of the kinetic warhead. With block IB and associated ship-based upgrades, the Navy gains the ability to defend against medium range missiles and some Intermediate Range Ballistic Missiles.

SM-3 block II will widen the missile body to 21 in (530 mm) and decrease the size of the maneuvering fins. It will still fit in Mk41 vertical launch systems, and the missile will be faster and have longer range.

The SM-3 block IIA is a joint Raytheon/Mitsubishi Heavy Industries project, adding a larger diameter kill vehicle that is more maneuverable, and carrying another sensor/ discrimination upgrade. It was scheduled to debut around 2015, whereupon the Navy will have a weapon that can engage some intercontinental ballistic missiles.

| Designation | Block | Notes |
|---|---|---|
| RIM-161A | SM-3 block I | Development version. The SM-3 block I uses the basic SM-2ER block IVA airframe and propulsion: Third-stage rocket motor (Advanced Solid Axial Stage, ASAS, by Alliant Techsystems); GPS/INS guidance section (GAINS, GPS-Aided Inertial Navigation System); LEAP (Lightweight Exo-Atmospheric Projectile) kinetic warhead (i.e., a non-explosive hit-to-kill warhead) |
| RIM-161B | SM-3 block IA | 1-color seeker; Solid divert attitude control system (SDACS) |
| RIM-161C | SM-3 block IB | Passed critical design review on 13 July 2009.: 2-color IIR seeker; Throttleable divert attitude control system (TDACS); All-reflective optics; Advanced signal processor |
| RIM-161D | SM-3 block IIA | High-velocity kinetic warhead; 21-inch-diameter (530 mm) first-stage rocket propulsion |
| None to date | SM-3 block IIB | High-divert kinetic warhead; Advanced discrimination seeker |

Table sources, reference material:

A further SM-3 block IIB was "conceived for fielding in Europe around 2022". In March 2013, Defense Secretary Chuck Hagel announced that the development program of the SM-3 block IIB, also known as the "next generation AEGIS missile" (NGAM), was undergoing restructuring. Under Secretary James N. Miller was quoted saying that "We no longer intend to add them [SM-3 block IIB] to the mix, but we'll continue to have the same number of deployed interceptors in Poland that will provide coverage for all of NATO in Europe", explaining that Poland is scheduled instead for the deployment of "about 24 SM-3 IIA interceptors – same timeline, same footprint of U.S. forces to support that." A US defense official was quoted saying that "The SM3 IIB phase four interceptors that we are now not going to pursue never existed other than on Power Points; it was a design objective." Daniel Nexon connected the backpedaling of the administration on the block IIB development with pre-election promises made by Obama to Dmitry Medvedev. Pentagon spokesman George E. Little denied however that Russian objections played any part in the decision.

== Operational history ==
=== United States ===
==== Missile defense ====
In September 2009, President Obama announced plans to scrap plans for missile defense sites in East Europe, in favor of missile defense systems located on US Navy warships. On 18 September 2009, Russian Prime Minister Putin welcomed Obama's plans for missile defense which may include stationing American Aegis armed warships in the Black Sea. This deployment began to occur that same month, with the deployment of Aegis-equipped warships with the RIM-161 SM-3 missile system, which complements the Patriot systems already deployed by American units.

In February 2013, a SM-3 intercepted a test IRBM target using tracking data from a satellite for the first time. On 23 April 2014, Raytheon announced that the U.S. Navy and the Missile Defense Agency had started to deploy the SM-3 Block 1B missile operationally. The deployment starts the second phase of the Phased Adaptive Approach (PAA) adopted in 2009 to protect Europe from Iranian ballistic missile threats. In the Far East the US Navy and Japan plan to deploy increased numbers of the next generation SM-3 Block IIA weapons on their ships.

The first use of the SM-3 in combat occurred during the April 2024 Iranian strikes against Israel. USS Carney and USS Arleigh Burke used four to seven missiles to shoot down at least six Iranian ballistic missiles.

The SM-3 has also been used by the US during the 2026 Iran war including to intercept Iranian ballistic missiles in Turkish airspace.

In March 2026 an SM-3 was reportedly fired at an Iranian intermediate-range ballistic missile heading for the joint US-UK military base on Diego Garcia.

==== Anti-satellite ====
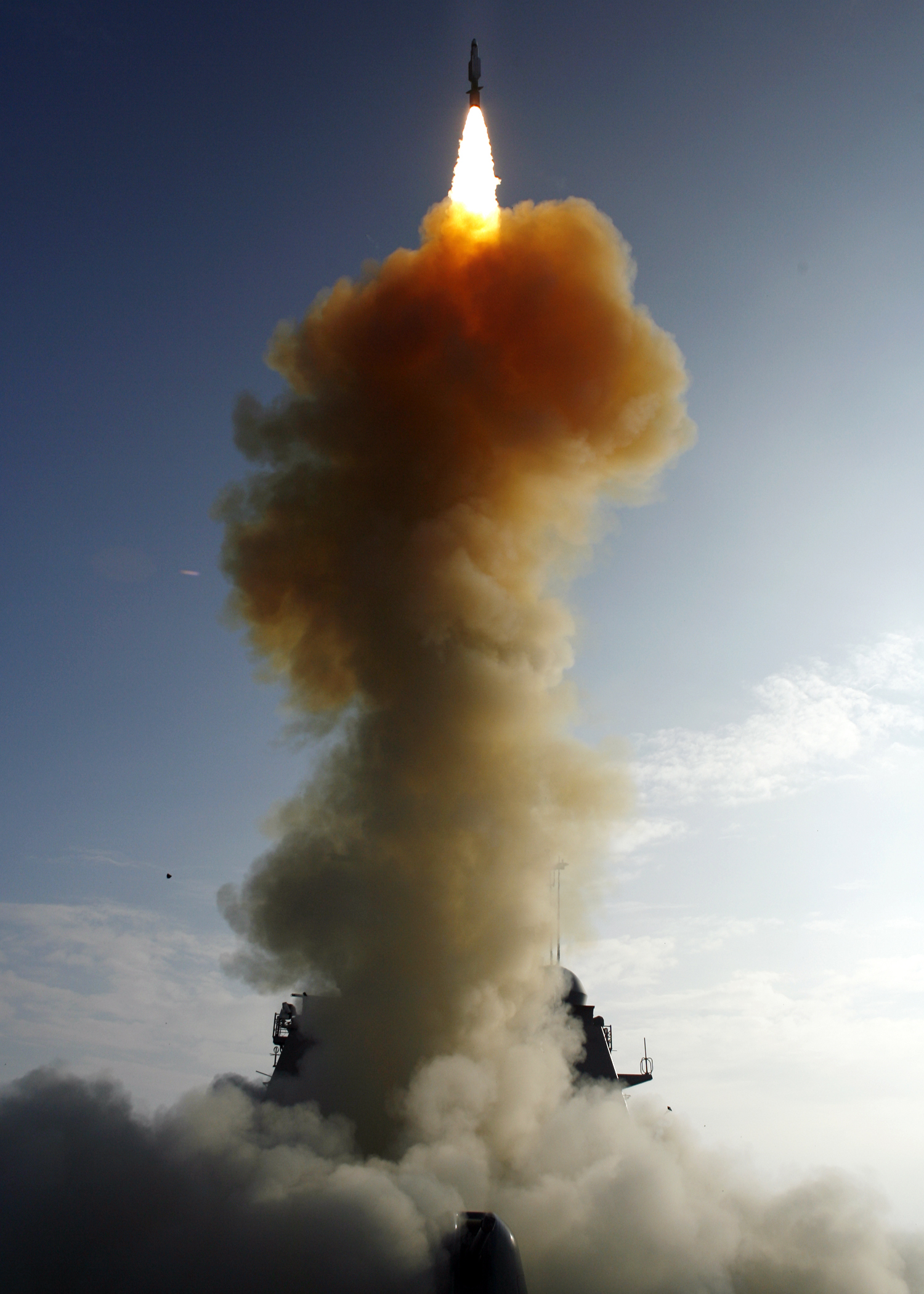
An SM-3 launched to destroy the failed USA-193 satellite

On February 14, 2008, U.S. officials announced plans to use a modified SM-3 missile launched from a group of three ships in the North Pacific to destroy the failed American satellite USA-193 at an altitude of 130 nautical miles (240 kilometers) shortly before atmospheric reentry. Officials publicly stated that the intention was to "reduce the danger to human beings" due to the release of toxic hydrazine fuel carried on board, but in secret dispatches, US officials indicated that the strike was, in fact, military in nature. A spokesperson stated that software associated with the SM-3 had been modified to enhance the chances of the missile's sensors recognizing that the satellite was its target, since the missile was not designed for ASAT operations.

On February 21, 2008, at 03:26 UTC, the Ticonderoga-class guided-missile cruiser USS Lake Erie fired a single SM-3 missile, hit and successfully destroyed the satellite, with a closing velocity of about 22,783 mph (36,666 km/h; 10.185 km/s) while the satellite was 247 kilometers (153 miles) above the Pacific Ocean. USS Decatur, USS Russell as well as other land, air, sea and space-based sensors were involved in the operation. The use of the missile was believed to be an anti-satellite weapon test in response to a similar 2007 test by China.

=== Japan ===
In December 2007, Japan conducted a successful test of an SM-3 block IA aboard JS Kongō against a ballistic missile. This was the first time a JMSDF vessel was employed to launch the interceptor missile during a test of the Aegis Ballistic Missile Defense System. In previous tests the Japan Maritime Self-Defense Force had provided tracking and communications.

In November 2008 a second Japanese-American joint test was performed from JS Chōkai which was unsuccessful. Following a failure review board, JFTM-3 occurred launching from JS Myōkō resulting in a successful intercept in October 2009. October 28, 2010 a successful test was performed from JDS Kirishima. The U.S. Navy's Pacific Missile Range Facility on Kauaʻi launched the ballistic missile target. The crew of Kirishima, operating off the coast of Kauaʻi, detected and tracked the target before firing a SM-3 Block IA missile.

The Japanese Defense Ministry is considering allocating money in the fiscal 2015 state budget for research on introducing the ground-based SM-3. Japanese ballistic missile defense strategy involves ship-based SM-3s to intercept missiles in space, while land-based Patriot PAC-3 missiles shoot down missiles SM-3s fail to intercept. Due to concern that PAC-3s could not respond to massive numbers of missiles fired simultaneously, and that the Maritime Self-Defense Force needs Aegis destroyers for other missions, basing SM-3s on land would be able to intercept more missiles earlier. With a coverage radius of 500 km (310 mi), three missile posts could defend all of Japan; launch pads can be disassembled, moved to other locations, and rebuilt in 5–10 days. Ground-basing of the SM-3 is dubbed "Aegis Ashore." By October 2016, Japan was considering procuring either Aegis Ashore or THAAD to add a new missile defense layer.

On August 31, 2022, the Japan Ministry of Defense announced that JMSDF will operate two "Aegis system equipped ships" (イージス・システム搭載艦 in Japanese) to replace the earlier plan of Aegis Ashore installations, commissioning one by the end of fiscal year 2027, and the other by the end of FY2028. The budget for design and other related expenses are to be submitted in the form of "item requests", without specific amounts, and the initial procurement of the lead items are expected to clear legislation by FY2023. Construction is to begin in the following year of FY2024. At 20,000 tons each, both vessels will be the largest surface combatant warships operated by the JMSDF, and according to Popular Mechanics, they will "arguably [be] the largest deployable surface warships in the world.".

On 16 November 2022, the guided-missile destroyer Maya fired an SM-3 Block IIA missile, successfully intercepting the target outside the atmosphere in the first launch of the missile from a Japanese warship. On 18 November 2022, the Haguro likewise fired an SM-3 Block IB missile with a successful hit outside the atmosphere. Both test firings were conducted at the Pacific Missile Range Facility on Kauaʻi Island, Hawaii, in cooperation with the U.S. Navy and U.S. Missile Defense Agency. This was the first time the two ships conducted SM-3 firings in the same time period, and the tests validated the ballistic missile defense capabilities of Japan's newest Maya-class destroyers.

=== NATO host countries ===
==== Poland ====
On July 3, 2010, Poland and the United States signed an amended agreement for missile defense under whose terms land-based SM-3 systems would be installed in Poland at Redzikowo. This configuration was accepted as a tested and available alternative to missile interceptors that were proposed during the Bush administration but which are still under development. U.S. Secretary of State Hillary Clinton, present at the signing in Kraków along with Polish Foreign Minister Radoslaw Sikorski, stressed that the missile defense program was aimed at deterring threats from Iran, and posed no challenge to Russia. As of March 2013, Poland is scheduled to host "about 24 SM3 IIA interceptors" in 2018. This deployment is part of phase 3 of the European Phased Adaptive Approach (EPAA).

==== Romania ====
In 2010/2011 the US government announced plans to station land-based SM-3s (Block IB) in Romania at Deveselu starting in 2015, part of phase 2 of EPAA. There are some tentative plans to upgrade them to Block IIA interceptors around 2018 as well (EPAA phase 3). In March 2013, a US defense official was quoted saying "The Romanian cycle will start out in 2015 with the SM-3 IB; that system is in flight testing now and doing quite well. We are very confident it is on track and on budget, with very good test results. We are fully confident the missile we are co-developing with Japan, the SM-3 IIA, will have proved in flight testing, once we get to that phase. Assuming success in that flight testing, then we will have ready the option of upgrading the Romanian site to the SM-3 IIA, either all of the interceptor tubes or we'll have a mix. We have to make that decision. But both options will be there."

The SM-3 Block IIB (currently in development for EPAA phase 4) was considered for deployment to Romania as well (around 2022), but a GAO report released Feb. 11, 2013 found that "SM-3 Block 2B interceptors launched from Romania would have difficulty engaging Iranian ICBMs launched at the United States because it lacks the range. Turkey is a better option, but only if the interceptors can be launched within 100 miles of the launch site and early enough to hit targets in their boost phase, an engagement scenario that presents a whole new set of challenges. The best basing option is in the North Sea, but making the SM-3 Block 2B ship compatible could add significantly to its cost". The troubles of the Block IIB program however do not affect the planned Block IB deployments in Romania.

== Operators ==
=== Current operators ===
- Japan
- South Korea — Ordered in October 2018.
- United States

==== Aegis Ashore ====
- Romania
- Poland

=== Potential operators ===
- Netherlands is planning to buy SM-3 missiles for their De Zeven Provinciën class frigates as part of the Defensienota 2022 (Strategic Plan 2022) to supplement the BMD sensor capabilities.
- Turkey is considering the SM-3s for its upcoming TF-2000 destroyer program. Instead of Aegis guidance, Turkey plans on integrating a more advanced version of HAVELSAN's Genesis architecture and a phased array radar built by ASELSAN. Genesis is currently jointly offered with Raytheon as a C4ISR upgrade for Oliver Hazard Perry-class frigates around the world.

== Gallery ==
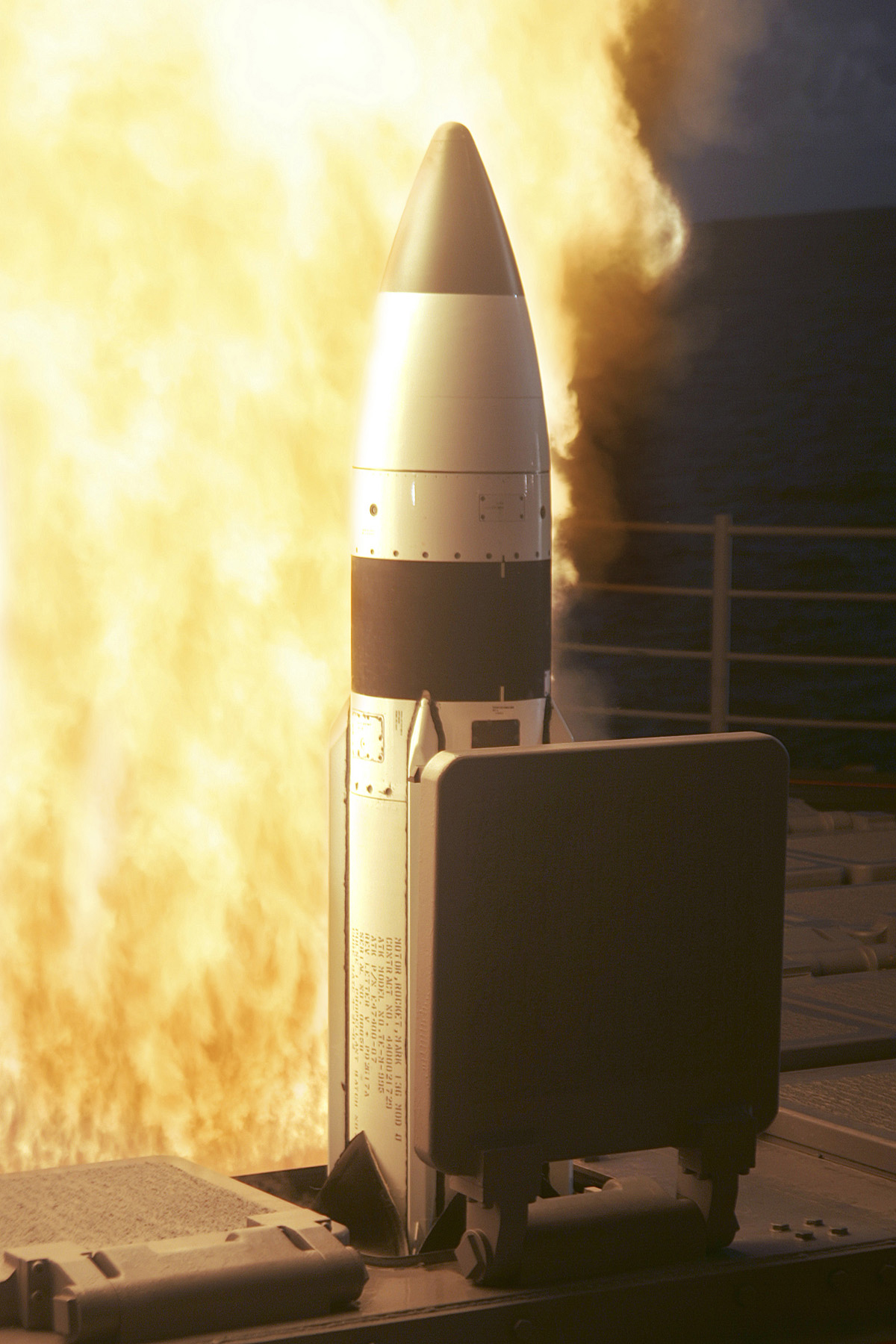
SM-3 launch from USS Lake Erie, 2005

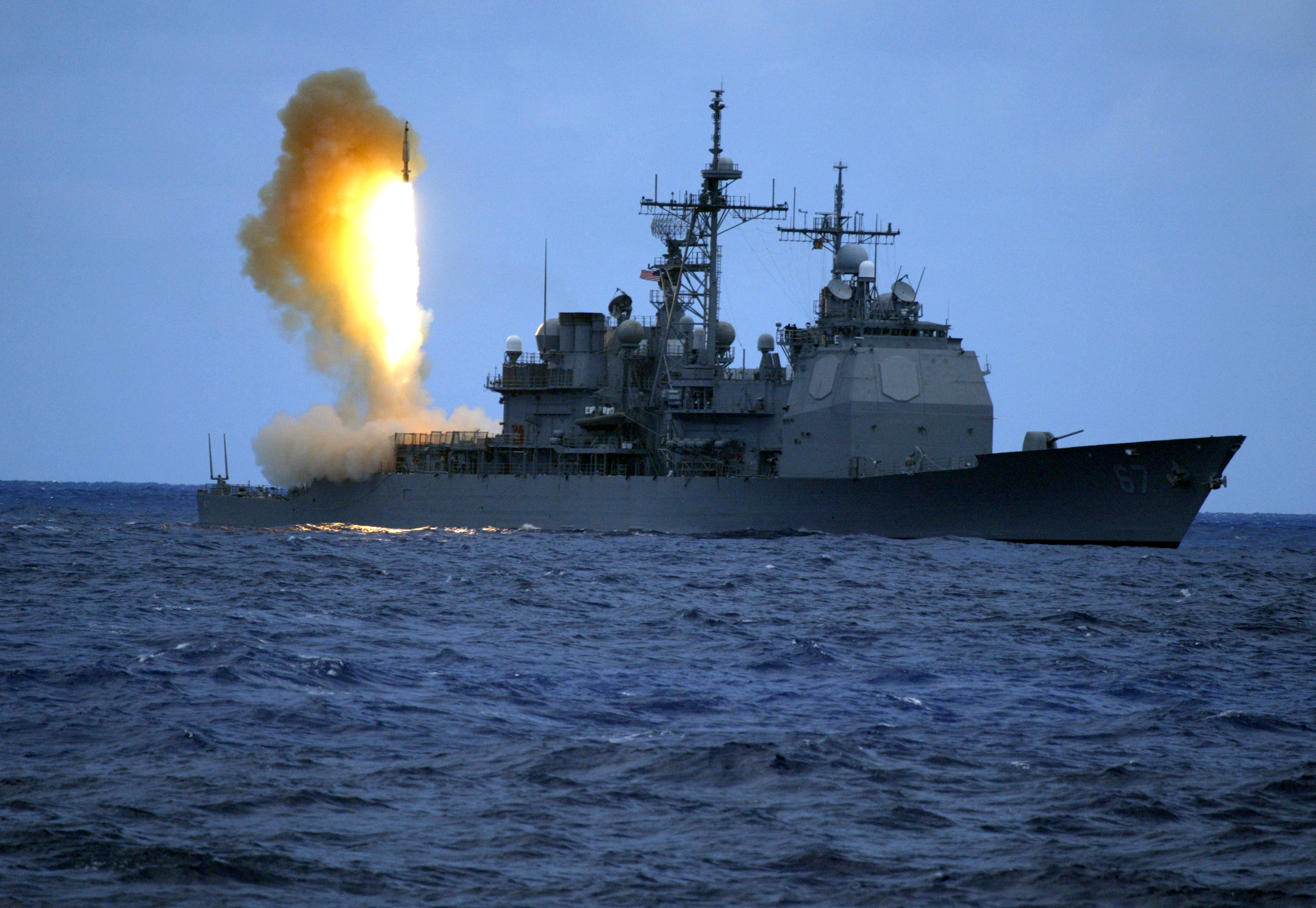
SM-3 launch from USS Shiloh, 2006

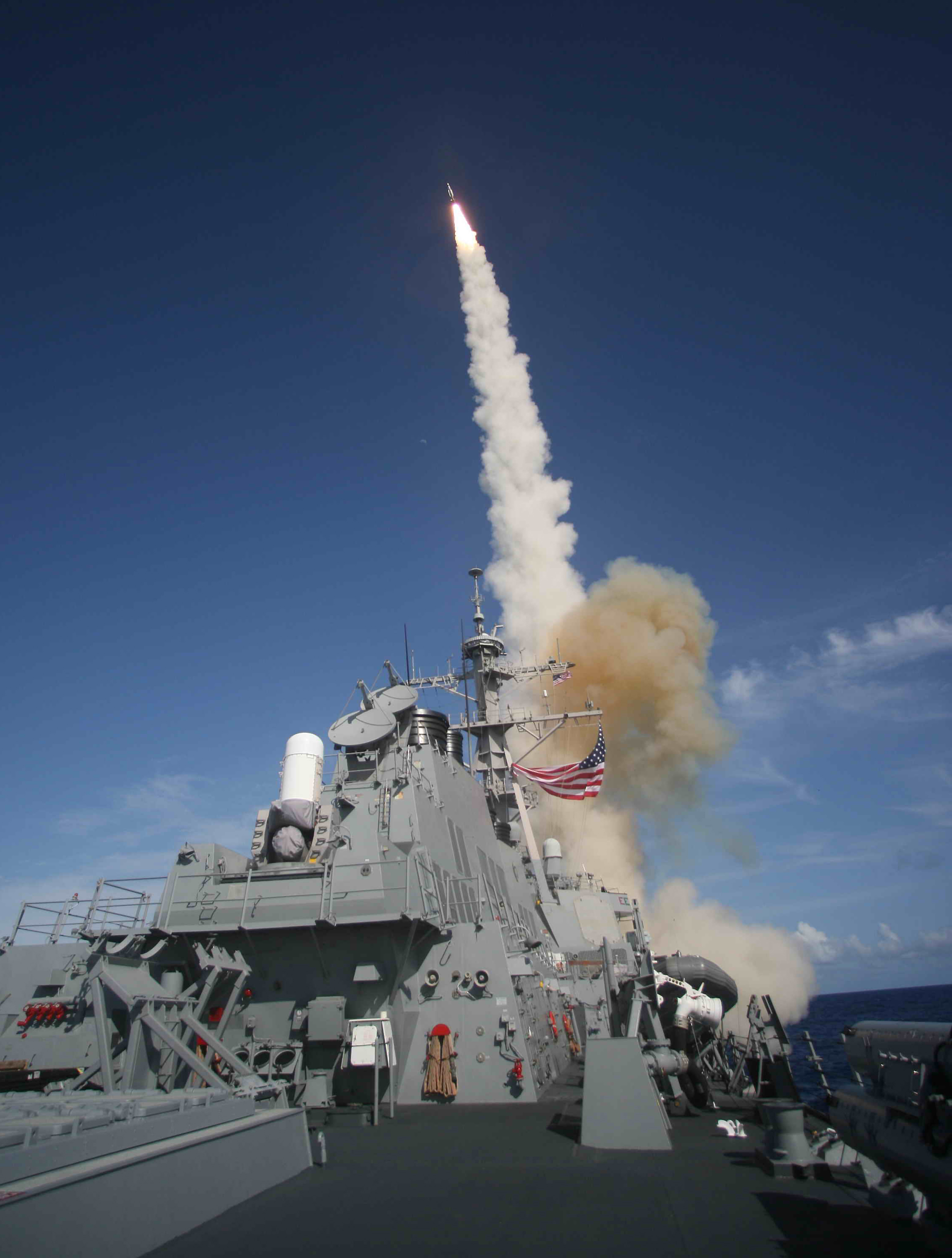
SM-3 climb from USS Decatur, 2007

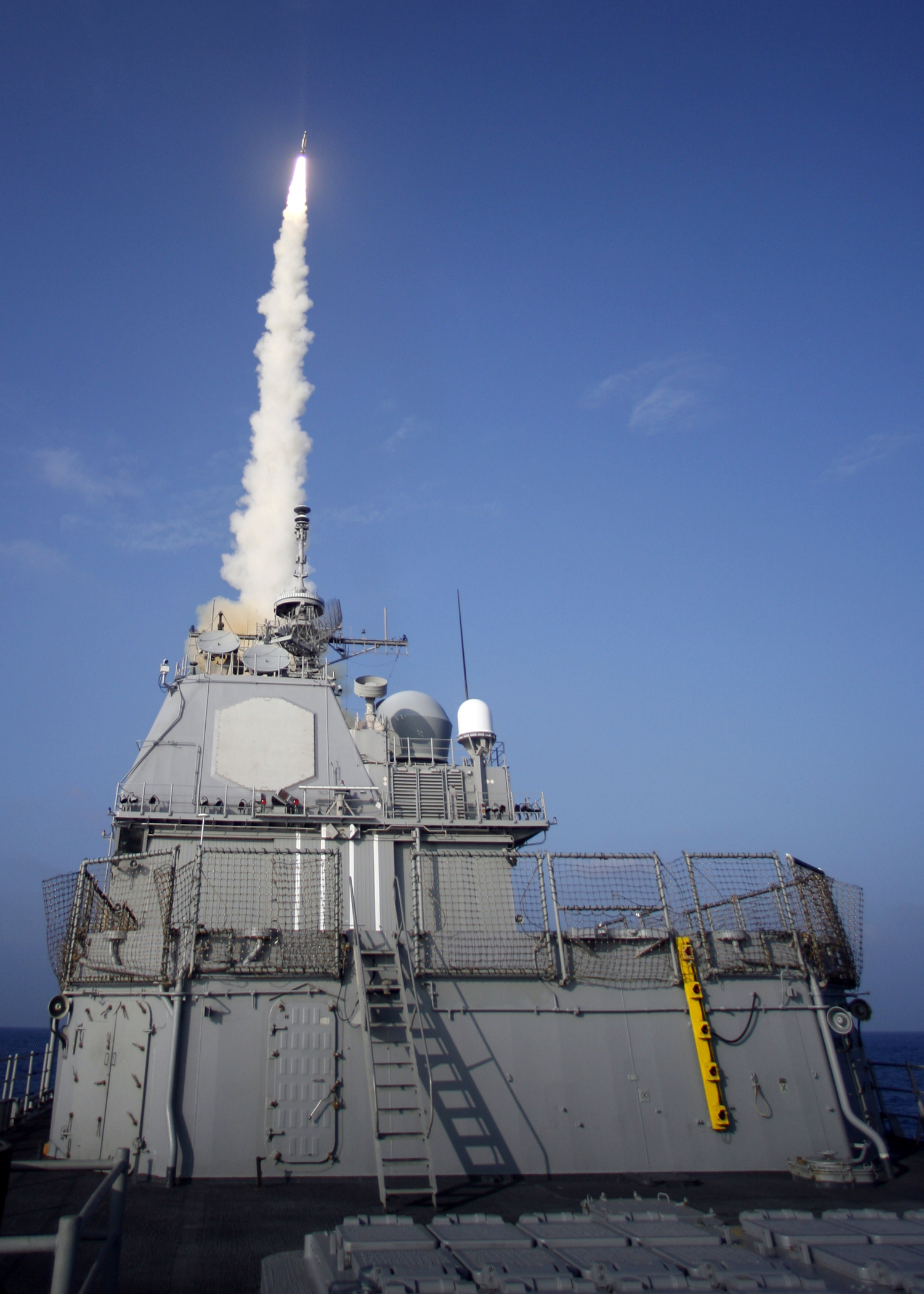
SM-3 climb from USS Lake Erie, 2008

== See also ==
- ArcLight, DARPA's program on developing ground attack missile based on SM-3's booster
- Arrow 3, Israel's home-grown alternative
- THAAD, US Army's solution
- RIM-174 Standard ERAM, (SM-6)
- Comparison of anti-ballistic missile systems
