= Long Range Discrimination Radar =

US radar system

Long Range Discrimination Radar (LRDR)
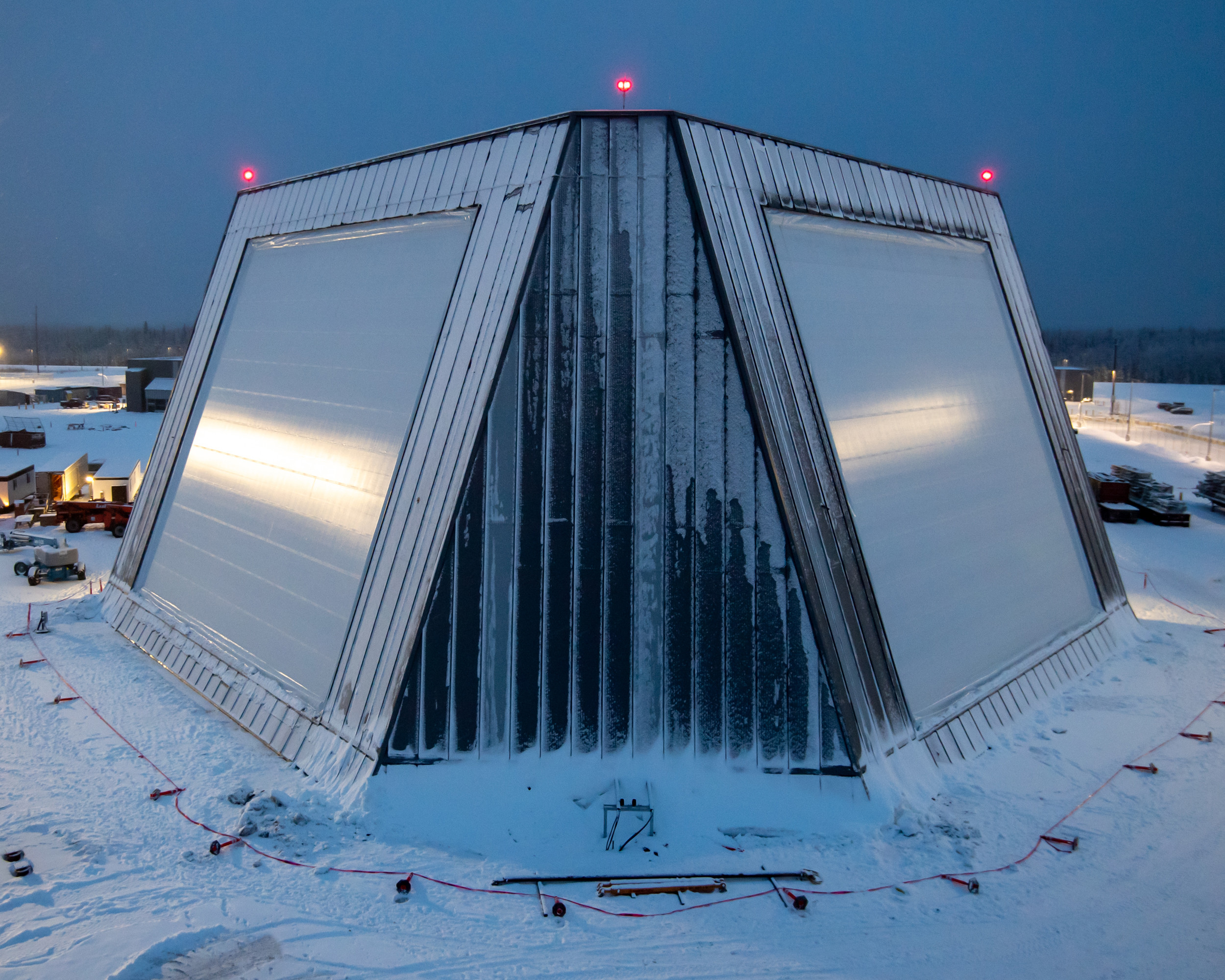
- LRDR at Clear Space Force Station, Alaska
- Country of origin: United States
- Manufacturer: Lockheed Martin
- Introduced: October 2020
- Type: Active electronically scanned array early-warning radar
- Frequency: ~2.7–3.5 GHz (11.1–8.6 cm); S band 200–300 MHz bandwidth
- Beamwidth: 240° (horizontal); 58.6° (vertical)
- RPM: Stationary
- Range: 4,300 to 7,500 mi (7,000 to 12,000 km)
- Height: 60 ft (18.29 m)
- Width: 60 ft (18.29 m)
- Azimuth: ±60°
- Elevation: −20° to +60°
- Precision: 20 ft (6 m)
- Power: est. peak: 18.6 MW per array face
- Other names: AN/SPY-7

The Long Range Discrimination Radar (LRDR) in Alaska is part of the United States's Ground-Based Midcourse Defense anti-ballistic missile system. The main contractor is Lockheed Martin, under a US$784 million contract from the Missile Defense Agency (MDA) in October 2015.

LRDR is a gallium nitride (GaN)–based solid-state active electronically scanned array (AESA) early-warning radar allowing for continuous coverage, even when it is undergoing maintenance. The radar consists of individual solid state radar blocks that can be combined to scale up the size of the radar. The multi-purpose GaN device used on the prototype version of the LRDR is from the Japanese electronics company Fujitsu, according to Lockheed Martin.

Construction in Alaska for the LRDR was scheduled to begin in 2019, tentatively at Clear Space Force Station in central Alaska. Each AESA's dimensions are 60 feet (18 m) high by 60 feet (18 m) wide; the field of view is 220 degrees.

In late February 2021, the MDA said that the radar installation was underway, with Initial Operational Capability to be achieved in 2021. Testing for Full Operational Capability is expected by 2023.

In mid-August 2023, the Flight Test Other-26 (FTX-26) was canceled due to an anomaly with the live ballistic missile target. When operational, the LRDR would be tied into the Ground-Based Midcourse Defense system and the Command and Control, Battle Management and Communications (C2BMC) system.

The LRDR may become part of the Golden Dome missile defense system.

In accordance with the Joint Electronics Type Designation System (JETDS), the "AN/SPY-7" designation represents the 7th design of an Army-Navy electronic device for a surface ship surveillance and control radar. The JETDS system is now used to name Department of Defense and some NATO electronics systems.

== Variants ==
An important distinction: the AN/SPY-7 is a family of scalable radars derived directly from the LRDR at Clear Space Force Station, Alaska, is a particular large, land-based implementation of related technology.

=== AN/SPY-7(V)1 ===
The AN/SPY-7(V)1 is the designation of an LRDR-derivative used with the Aegis Ballistic Missile Defense System (ABMDS). Lockheed Martin promoted this version of radar as the AN/SPY-1 refurbishment program to the US Navy extending the lifespan of the Ticonderoga-class cruiser and Arleigh Burke-class destroyer to beyond the 2040s. In December 2021, the AN/SPY-6 AESA radar from Raytheon was selected to retrofit Flight IIA Arleigh Burke destroyers; the same radar is used on Flight III ships.

On 30 July 2018, the Japanese government approved a plan to purchase two pairs of AN/SPY-7(V)1 for their Aegis Ashore facility to be installed in the Yamaguchi Prefecture and Akita Prefecture. In 2020 the Japanese Defense Ministry announced plans to build two ballistic missile defense warships, known as Aegis system equipped vessels (ASEV), to carry the SPY-7(V)1 arrays.

The MDA also decided to use AN/SPY-7(V)1 for the Aegis Ashore to be installed in Hawaii called Homeland Defense Radar – Hawaii (HDR-H). In a 2019 press relaease, Lockheed announced derivatives of the AN/SPY-7(V)1 would be used on the Canadian River-class destroyer and the Spanish F110-class frigate.

=== AN/SPY-7(V)2 ===
The AN/SPY-7(V)2 is the designation of an LRDR-derivative used by the F110-class frigates for the Spanish Navy.

=== AN/SPY-7(V)3 ===
In September 2020, the AN/SPY-7(V)3 designation was chosen by the Canadian government as the primary radar for the future River-class destroyers of the Royal Canadian Navy, and received the official AN/SPY-7(V)3 designation in June 2022.

== See also ==
- Joint Electronics Type Designation System – Unclassified designation system for United States military electronic equipment
- List of radars
- List of military electronics of the United States
