= Aegis system equipped vessels =

Japanese naval vessel design

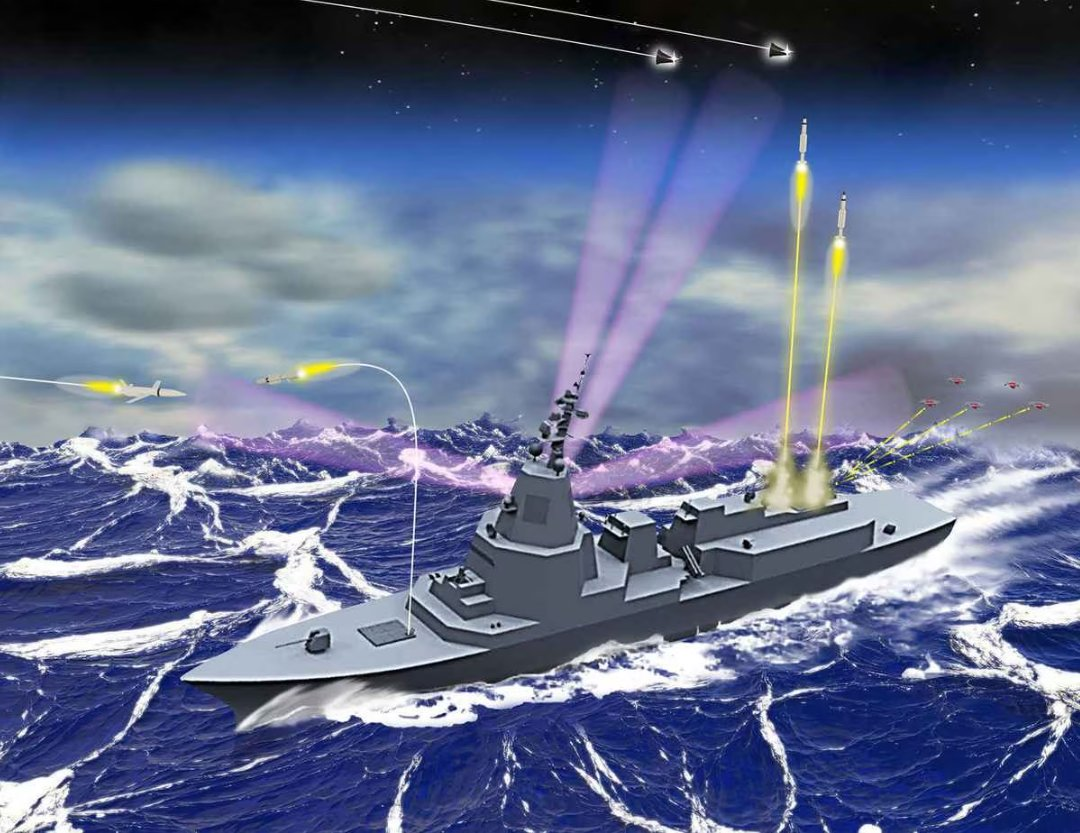
- Artist's impression of future BMD ship (JSDF)

Class overview
- Name: Aegis system equipped vessels (ASEV)
- Builders: Mitsubishi Heavy Industries; Japan Marine United Corporation
- Operators: Japan Maritime Self-Defense Force
- Cost: 1 trillion yen ($7.1 billion USD) both ships (est.)
- Building: 2

General characteristics
- Type: Cruiser
- Displacement: 14,000 t (14,000 long tons) standard
- Length: 190 m (620 ft)
- Beam: 25 m (82 ft)
- Propulsion: COGLAG - Two (2) x Rolls-Royce MT30 gas turbines (approx. 35.4 MW (47,500 hp) each)
- Speed: 30 knots (56 km/h)
- Complement: 240 (total)
- Sensors & processing systems: SPY-7(V)1 multi-function radar; J7.B Aegis Combat System
- Electronic warfare & decoys: NOLQ-2 ECM intercept and jammer; 4 × Mk 137 chaff and decoy launchers
- Armament: 1 × 5 inch (127mm/L62) Mk-45 Mod 4 naval gun in a stealth-shaped mount. (Made by Japan Steel Works licensed from its original manufacturer.); Mark 41 vertical launching system (Mk 41 VLS): 128 cells total; RIM-174 Standard Missile 6 (SM-6); RIM-161 Standard Missile 3 Block IIA (SM-3); Type 12 surface-to-ship missile (SM-12); RGM-109 land attack cruise missiles; Evolved SeaSparrow Missiles (ESSM)
- Aircraft carried: Mitsubishi SH-60J/K/L
- Aviation facilities: Flight deck and enclosed helicopter hangar
- Notes: Ballistic Missile Defense (BMD)

Aegis system equipped vessels (ASEV) or (Japanese: イージス・システム搭載艦) are a pair of ballistic missile defense (BMD) cruisers under construction to be operated by the Japanese Maritime Self-Defense Force (JMSDF) as dedicated sea-based BMD platforms, serving as an alternative to Japan's now-cancelled land-based Aegis Ashore BMD system.

== Design ==
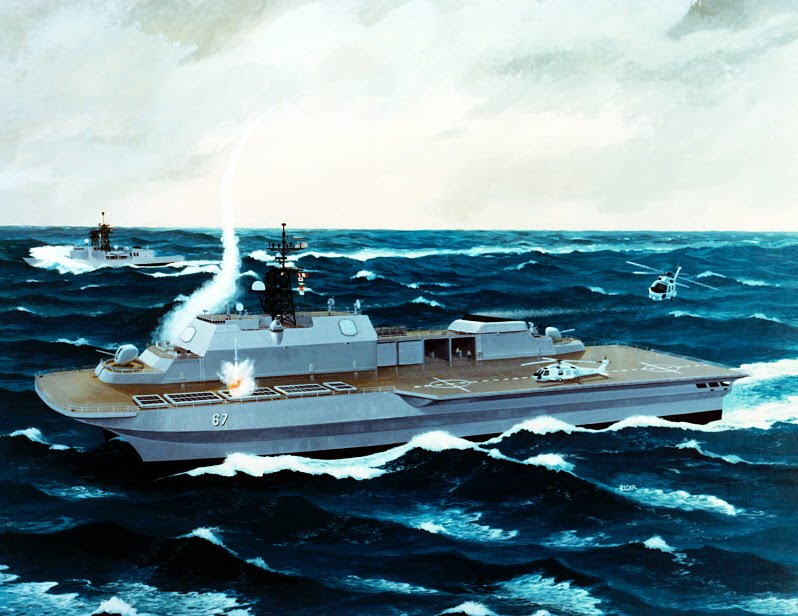
CGH-67 design (1986)

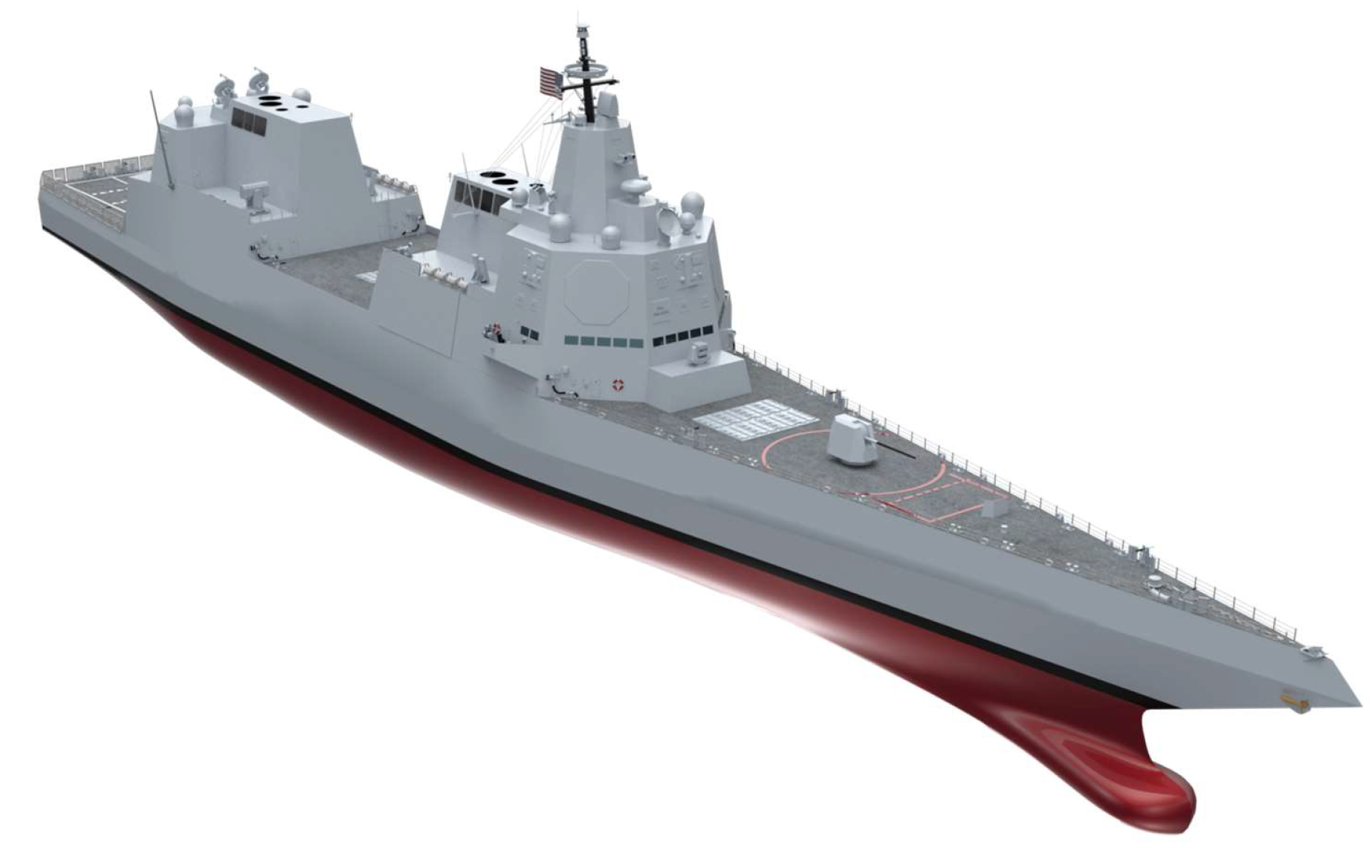
U.S. Navy proposed DDG(X) destroyer

In 2020, Japanese Defense Minister Nobuo Kishi announced plans to build 2 new Aegis destroyers to replace its scrapped land-based Aegis Ashore ballistic missile interceptors program. On August 31, 2022, the Japan Ministry of Defense announced that JMSDF will operate two "Aegis system equipped ships" (イージス・システム搭載艦 in Japanese) to replace its earlier cancellation of the Aegis Ashore program, commissioning one ship by the end of fiscal year 2027, and the other by the end of FY2028. The budget for design and other related expenses are to be submitted in the form of “item requests” (i.e., engine components), without specific amounts, and the initial procurement of the lead items are expected to clear legislation by FY2023. Construction is to begin in the following year of FY2024. The overall cost of building both ships is estimated to be 1 trillion yen (US$7.1 billion). The first ship is planned to be commissioned in 2028 and the second in 2029.

=== Initial SWATH design approach ===
Preliminary design postulated that the ASEV would be based on the Small Waterplane Area Twin Hull (SWATH) configuration used by Hibiki-class ocean surveillance ships, with the combined main deck area sufficient to accommodate the Aegis radar deckhouse and battery of SM-6 interceptor missile launchers. Such a SWATH-based configuration would be comparable to the 1986 CGH-67 design study (pictured) by the then David W. Taylor Naval Ship Research and Development Center of the U.S. Navy's Naval Sea Systems Command (NAVSEA) albeit without the explicit BMD orientation.

=== Current design ===
Original plans for the two ASEV ships called for a cruiser-sized warship with a standard displacement of 20,000 long tons (20,000 t) each, an overall length of 690 ft (210 m), and a beam of 130 ft (40 m) on a monohull configuration. The overall size offers enhanced habitability for its 110-person crew for extended deployments and relative simplicity in construction, and it is designed to provide a stable platform for its advanced sensors and weapon systems. Once completed, the two warships will be the largest surface combatant ships in service with the JMSDF, and according to Popular Mechanics, they will "arguably [be] the largest deployable surface warships in the world."

However, in November 2022, both Kyodo News and Jiji Press quoted an unnamed senior official in Japan's Ministry of Defense who noted that the proposed ASEV warships might be downsized in a size similar to Maya-class destroyers as their original proposed beam significantly reduced speed and maneuverability, making the ships easier to detect and target by the enemy. Later, on 23 December 2022, the Japanese MOD released additional 2023 budget and program guidance, including the first official illustration of the ASEV warship (See article info-box.), although no further details on ASEV ship dimensions were provided beyond the original facts and figures from the August 2022 release. USNI news editor Sam LaGrone noted that the overall design of the ASEV warship was comparable to the U.S. Navy's next-generation DDG(X) guided-missile destroyer (pictured).

=== Procurement ===
According to its published budget overview, for Fiscal Year 2023, the Japanese Ministry of Defense allocated 22.8 billion yens (US$1.654 billion) for the initial procurement of advanced components for the ASEV program in order to "significantly improved BMD capability capable of responding to lofted and simultaneous ballistic missiles, as well as expandability for responding to HGVs and other such threats." In related news, in a statement released on April 4, 2023, the Japanese Ministry of Defense announced the signing of four contracts worth 382.47 billion yens (US$2.83 billion) last week with Mitsubishi Heavy Industries (MHI) for development of standoff defense weapon systems for the Japanese Self Defense Force (JSDF). This standoff defense capability is expected to provide the JSDF with long-range strike capabilities against ships and amphibious forces invading Japan, particularly at its remote islands, such as the disputed Senkaku Islands administered by Japan, and its southwestern islands.

On 19 December 2023, Defense Minister Minoru Kihara announced approval for the funding for the construction of Aegis System Equipped Vessels (ASEV) in Fiscal Year 2024 and FY 2025 to be commissioned in 2027 and 2028 respectively. Initial FY 2024 ASEV funding was set at 373.1 billion yen (US$2.6 billion), a slight reduction from the 379.7 billion yen (US $2.64 billion) that the Japanese Ministry of Defense had sought in its initial FY 2024 budget request submitted in August 2023. This ASEV procurement decision was subsequently affirmed when the Japanese Cabinet approved the Ministry of Defense's budget for Fiscal Year 2024 on 22 December 2023.

== Equipment ==
=== Ballistic missile defense systems ===
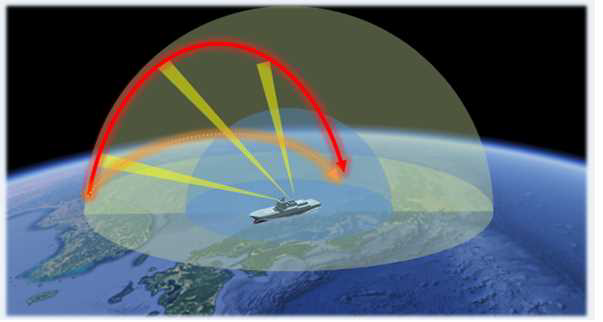
Proposed BMD profile (JSDF image)

As a ship-based alternative to the land-based Aegis Ashore system, the Aegis system-equipped warships could be armed with the Standard Missile 6 (SM-6) Sea-Based Terminal (SBT) system (pictured), as well as the J7.B Aegis Weapon System and Lockheed Martin's SPY-7(V)1 multi-functional radar, initially contracted for Aegis Ashore. According to Lockheed Martin, J7.B is the integration of SPY-7 into J7 (BL9), the latest software currently installed on JMSDF's Aegis-equipped guided missile destroyers. The SPY-7(V)1 radar uses scaled equipment and software derived from the advanced Long Range Discrimination Radar (LRDR) located in the Clear Space Force Station, Alaska, and operated by the U.S. Missile Defense Agency (MDA).

In support of this objective, on 20 October 2022, the U.S. Department of State approved and the Defense Security Cooperation Agency (DSCA) notified the United States Congress that Japan is set to be the first country after the United States to field the Standard Missile 6 (SM-6) as part of a proposed US$450 million Foreign Military Sale (FMS) arms package. Pending Congressional approval, Japan was conditionally approved to buy up to 32 of the Raytheon-built SM-6 Block I missiles. This notification is a follow-up of a 2017 decision from U.S. Department of Defense that conditionally approved Japan, South Korea, and Australia to buy SM-6 missile systems.

=== Weapon systems ===
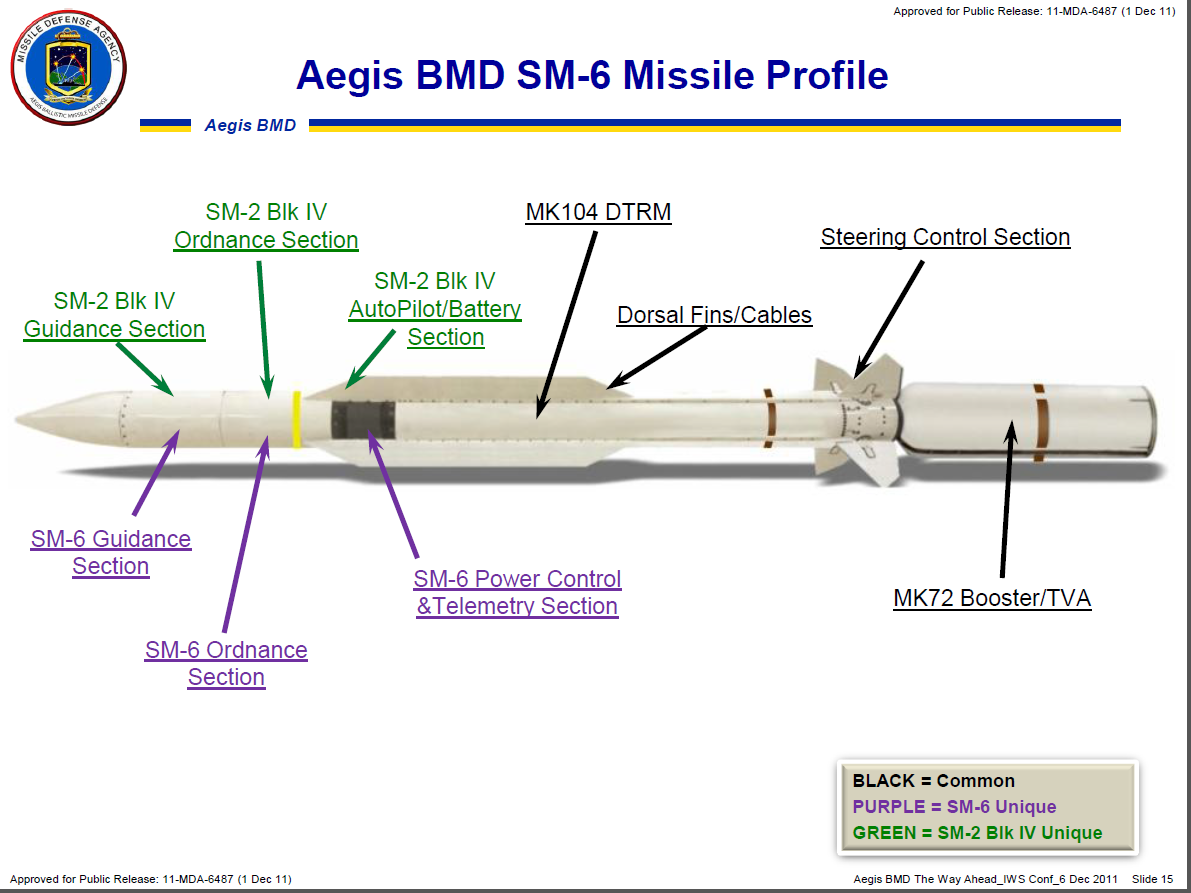
Standard SM-6 missile components

The ASEV warships will be equipped to defend against hypersonic glide vehicles, as such new hypersonic missile designs are too evasive for current ballistic missile defense systems to reliably intercept. Also, the two ships will be equipped with the upgraded sea-based version of the Type-12 anti-ship cruise missile (ASCM) system capable of striking land and naval targets with a range of around 1,000 km (540 nmi; 621 mi). Given the manpower requirements, non-BMD armament may be limited to such close-in self-defense weapon systems as Phalanx CIWS or SeaRAM.

On 16 December 2022, Defense Buildup Program (防衛力整備計画) document announced a 110.4 billion yen (US$820 million) budget allocation to modify the JMSDF's Aegis-equipped guided missiles destroyers to carry Tomahawk land attack cruise missiles (TLAM). Although it is not stated what specific modifications are to be undertaken, Lockheed Martin's Tactical Tomahawk Weapons Control System (TTWCS) is the likeliest system to be integrated into the Aegis destroyers. The Japanese government had previously approached the U.S. government to purchase the U.S.-made Tomahawk cruise missile for attacking enemy bases. The Japanese government decided to purchase the Tomahawk cruise missile before their domestically built improved range Type 12 surface-to-ship missile systems started full-scale operation. The intent behind the JMSDF acquiring both long-range cruise missile systems is to act as a deterrent to North Korea, with the weapons able to strike naval and land targets.

In a tweet posted on 17 December 2022, Satō Masahisa, Director, Committee on Foreign Affairs and Defense of the House of Councillors in the Diet, stated that the proposed ASEV warships would be capable of speeds in excess of 30 knots (56 km/h); Standard Missile 6 (SM6) and Evolved SeaSparrow Missile (ESSM) systems; upgraded Type 12 anti-ship standoff missiles; Cooperative Engagement Capability (CEC) and Engage-on-Remote (EoR) functions; and now 128 VLS cells. On 23 December 2022, the Japanese Ministry of Defense released its 2023 budget and program guidance that featured the first official illustration of the ASEV warship, revealing that its missile arsenal will use the Mark 41 Vertical Launching System (Mk 41 VLS) grouped in two locations, forward of the bridge deckhouse and aft above the helicopter hangar.

On 17 November 2023, the U.S. Department of State announced the sale of up to 200 Tomahawk Block IV All Up Rounds (AURs) (RGM-109E) cruise missiles, 200 Tomahawk Block V AURs (RGM-109E) cruise missiles, and 14 Tactical Tomahawk Weapon Control Systems to the Japanese Ministry of Defense as part of a part of a US$2.35 billion foreign military sales package. One month previously Japanese Defense Minister Minoru Kihara indicated a planned buy of Block IV Tomahawks in FY2025 and Block V in FY2026 and FY2027, thereby advancing acquisition Block IV acquisition by a year. In a press conference on 20 November 2023, Kihara stated that the Defense Ministry would coordinate closely with United States in the delivery of the Tomahawk missile system on its sea-based and ground platforms. On 28 March 2024, the Japanese Ministry of Defense announced the start of Tomahawk missile training of JMSDF personnel by the United States Navy. Initial training would take place onboard the guided-missile destroyer USS McCampbell (DDG-85) based at United States Fleet Activities Yokosuka.

=== Ship sensor systems ===
The ASEV warships will use the UNIted COmbined Radio aNtenna (UNICORN) NORA-50 integration mast, which has a bar-shaped dome that houses the antennas for tactical data link, Tactical Air Navigation System (TACAN), and communications. According to the Acquisition, Technology & Logistics Agency (ATLA), UNICORN has a shape designed to reduce the radar cross section (RCS), which makes it stealthy. It is currently being installed on the Mogami-class frigates entering service or under construction, and there is a possibility that they will be considered for integration into the proposed Next-Generation Offshore Patrol Vessel program.

=== Propulsion & power systems ===
Principle of a CODAG system, with two speed diesel gearboxes

Given the manning and electrical requirements, the Aegis system equipped vessels (ASEV) requires a highly automated, low maintenance, all-electrical propulsion system. One such system is a Combined diesel and gas (CODAG) propulsion (pictured), consisting of diesel engines for cruising and gas turbines that can be switched on for high-speed transits, and it is used on the JMSDF's Hyūga class and Izumo class helicopter carriers as well as Mogami-class frigates. In May 2024, it was announced that the two ASEV warship would be equipped with Rolls-Royce MT30 gas turbines as their main propulsion plant.

== Operational concept ==
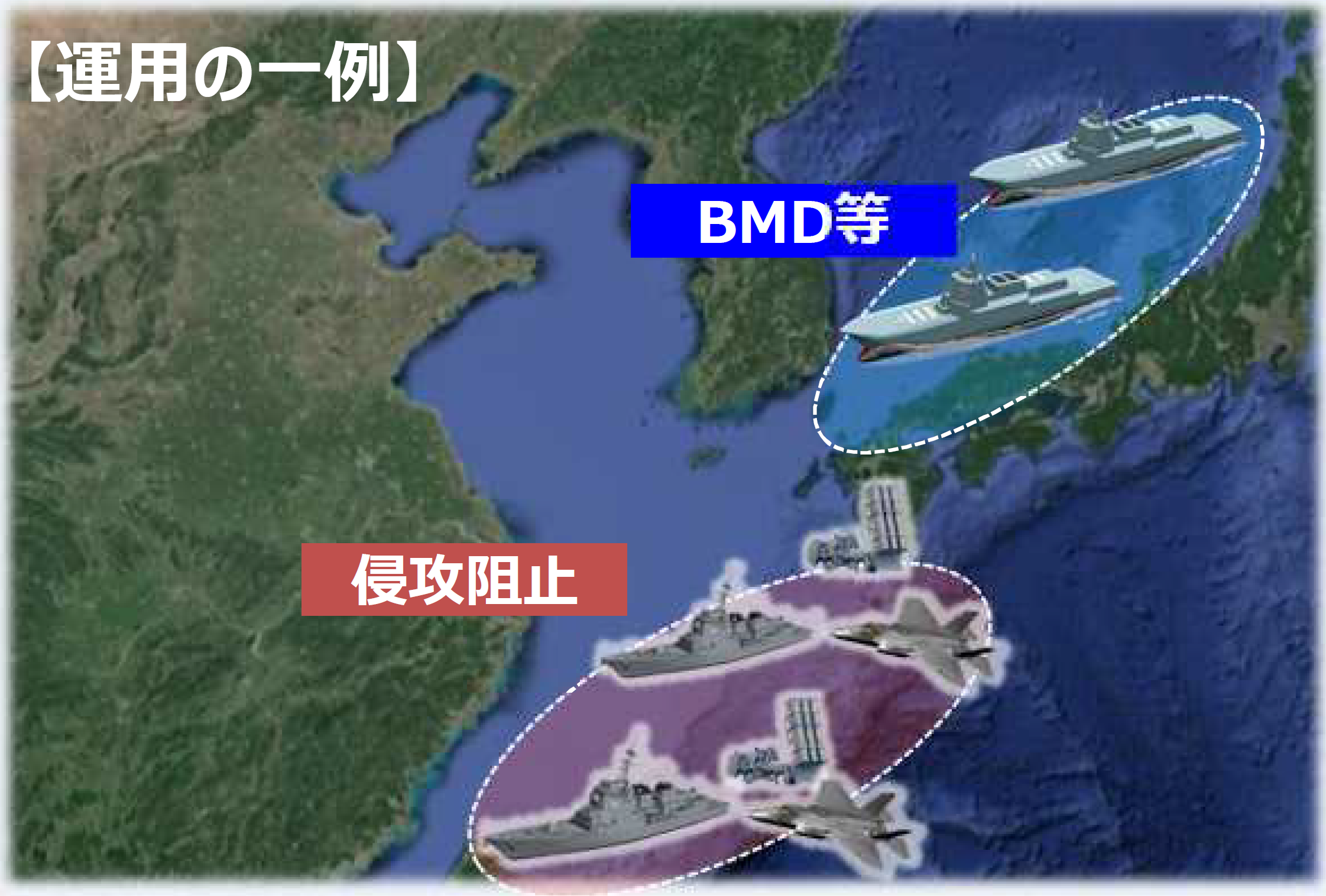
Examples of operations (JSDF image)

On 16 December 2022, the Japanese Cabinet approved a trio of defense-related policy documents, including its new National Security Strategy (NSS or 国家安全保障戦略), the strategic guideline document for the Japanese government's policies regarding diplomacy, defense, and economic security for the next decade. Based on the NSS, the National Defense Strategy (NDS or 国家防衛戦略) document outlined Japan's defense policy goals and the means to achieve them while the Defense Buildup Program (DBP or 防衛力整備計画) document outlined the scale of the introduction of specific defense equipment within the budgetary objectives. According to the Defense Buildup Program document, the JMSDF will increase the number of Aegis-equipped guided-missile destroyers (DDG) from the current 8 to 10 warships, as well as the introduction of two Aegis system-equipped vessels (ASEV) to be deployed in ballistic missile defense (BMD) operations. By the end of the decade, the JMSDF will operate 12 ships equipped with Aegis Weapon System (AWS) and likewise plans to replace its fleet of older, less capable destroyers and destroyer escorts with Mogami-class frigates.

On 23 December 2022, the Japanese Ministry of Defense's 2023 budget and program guidance documented provided examples of operations (運用の一例) for the Aegis-equipped naval forces of the Japanese Maritime Self Defense Force (MSDF). The two ASEV warship would be exclusively tasked for dedicated ballistic missile defense (BDM) missions (BMD等) and operate off the Korean peninsula in the Sea of Japan, allowing the other Aegis guided-missile destroyers to meet other contingencies (侵攻阻止) while operating independently to maintain the maritime domain awareness (MDA) and keep the sea lines of communication (SLOC) open in the East China Sea southwest of the Japanese home islands (pictured).

== Criticisms ==
Senior research fellow Brent Sadler of The Heritage Foundation criticized the proposed ASEV program, noting that the total of two units was insufficient to keep an ASEV ship deployed continuously at sea. Sadler noted that the more typical operational cycle would require at least three ships, with one ship at sea on deployment, a second ship undergoing refit and upkeep following deployment, and a third ship going through work-up for deployment to relieve the first ship. Sadler also noted that the 2027–2029 timeframe to complete the construction of both AESV ships leaves Japan highly vulnerable during the interim period. Regarding Japan's relative vulnerability, StrategyPage noted that the original Aegis Ashore BMD land-based facilities would not have been operational until 2024.

Additionally, senior defense analyst Felix Chang of the Foreign Policy Research Institute (FPRI) observed that the proposed ASEV warships would be extremely vulnerable to such next-generation Chinese anti-ship ballistic missiles as the DF-21D and DF-26, with DF-21D having a range of 1,500 kilometers while the DF-26 has a range of 4,000 kilometers. Chang also mentioned that China has fitted its DF-21D missiles with maneuverable reentry vehicles that guide with terminal seekers to compensate and correct for any inaccurate targeting data.

Finally, senior fellow Zack Cooper of the American Enterprise Institute pointed out that a sea-based BMD system is overall not a more cost-effective alternative to a shore-based system. In 2020, Japanese news media reported that officials within the Japanese Ministry of Defense recognized that alternatives to the land-based Aegis Ashore system would all be significantly more expensive, by up to half again as costly.

== Ships in the class ==
Building No.	Name	Hull Pennant No.	Builder/Shipyard	Plan	Laid down	Launched	Commissioned	Home port	Flotilla	Squadron	Status	Note
1901	TBD	CG-191	Mitsubishi Heavy Industries (MHI)	2023	18 July 2025	TBD	March 2028 (est.)	TBD	TBD	TBD	Authorized	
1902	TBD	CG-192	Japan Marine United (JMU)	2023	5 February 2026	TBS	March 2029 (est.)	TBD	TBD	TBD	Authorized	

=== Naming conventions ===
Neither ASEV warship has been officially named. Ships of the JMSDF are known as Japan Ships (護衛艦; Go'[e]i:-Kan; prefix JS) and are classified according to the warship type. ASEV warship will be designated as a guided-missile cruiser (CG), but it is not known if they will be named after provinces, like the Helicopter Destroyer (DDH) and Cruiser Voler Multipurpose (CVM), or after mountains, like the Guided Missile Destroyers (DDG)

== See also ==
- Kongō-class destroyer
- Atago-class destroyer
- Maya-class destroyer
- Arsenal ship
- Arleigh Burke-class destroyer
- CG(X)
- DDG(X)
- KDDX-class destroyer
- Kirov-class battlecruiser
- Sejong the Great-class destroyer
- Strike cruiser
- Ticonderoga-class cruiser
- Type 055 destroyer
- Zumwalt-class destroyer

== Bibliography ==
=== Secondary sources ===
- Akihisa Nagashima (August 2021). Japan and Security: A Closer Look at the Operational Concept for "Aegis System-equipped Vessels" - Issues for Consideration (PDF) (Report). Konrad-Adenauer-Stiftung. Archived from the original on 24 June 2023. "This paper was originally posted in Japanese by House of Representatives member Akihisa Nagashima on his blog (archived) on March 24, 2021 and has been translated into English by Konrad Adenauer Stiftung Japan Office with permission."

=== Official sources ===
==== Japanese Ministry of Defense ====
- "Budget for Fundamental Strengthening of Defense Capabilities FY Reiwa 5 (2023) Budget Overview" (PDF). Budget overview. Japanese Ministry of Defense. 23 December 2022. "in Japanese (防衛力整備計画)."
- "Defense Programs and Budget of Japan FY Reiwa 5 (2023) Budget Overview: Budget for Fundamental Strengthening of Defense Capabilities" (PDF). Budget overview. Japanese Ministry of Defense. 23 December 2022. "In Japanese (防衛力抜本的強化「元年」予算)."
- "Defense Buildup Program (DBP)" (PDF). Basis of Defense Policy. Japanese Ministry of Defense. 16 December 2022. "In English."
- "National Defense Strategy of Japan" (PDF). Basis of Defense Policy. Japanese Ministry of Defense. 16 December 2022. "In English."
- "National Security Strategy of Japan" (PDF). Basis of Defense Policy. Japanese Ministry of Defense. December 2022. "In English."

==== United States sources ====
- "Fiscal Year 2023 Defense Programs and Budget of Japan" (PDF). USNI News Blog. United States Naval Institute. 30 March 2023. "English language version."
- Mary Beth D. Nikitin (23 January 2003). Report to Congress on North Korea's Nuclear Weapons and Missile Programs In Focus (PDF) (Report). Congressional Research Service (CRS). if10472.

=== Periodicals ===
- Ackley, Dick (October 1986). "SABMIS – SUBMERGED". Submarine Review. n.p.: Naval Submarine League. pp. 95–87. "Registration required."
- Polmar, Norman (June 2003). "U.S. Navy: Ballistic Missile Defense…From the Sea". Proceedings. Vol. 129, no. 6. Annapolis, Maryland: United States Naval Institute. "Registration required."
- Schneider, Mark Bernard (July 1969). "SABMIS and the Future of Strategic Warfare". Proceedings. Vol. 95, no. 7. Annapolis, Maryland: United States Naval Institute. "Registration required."
