= Ground-Based Interceptor =

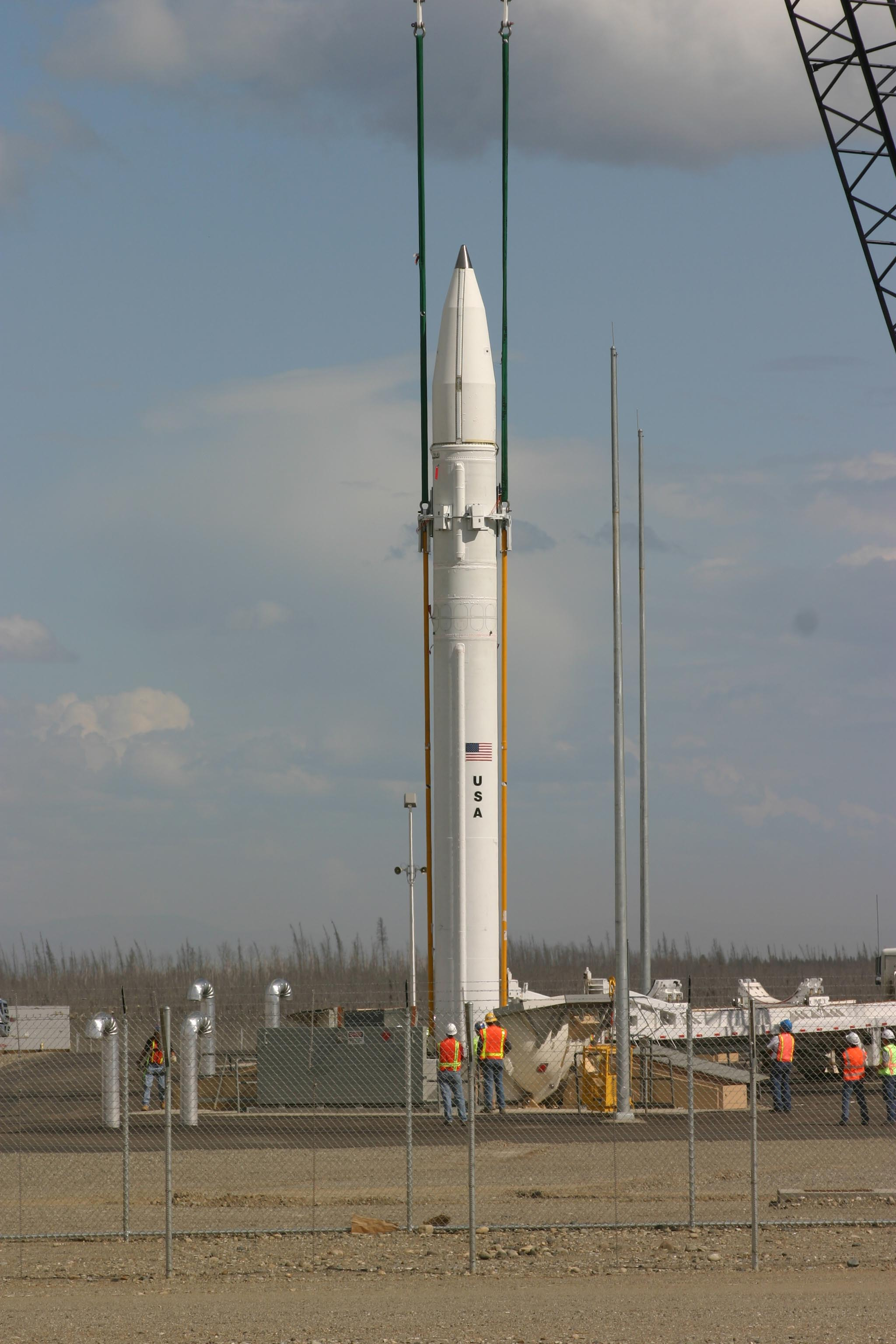
- A Ground-Based Interceptor loaded into a silo at Fort Greely, Alaska, in July 2004
- Type: Anti-ballistic missile
- Place of origin: United States

Service history
- Used by: United States Army

Production history
- Manufacturer: Orbital Sciences Corporation; Raytheon; Boeing Defense, Space & Security

Specifications
- Mass: 21,600 kilograms (47,600 lb)
- Length: 16.61 m (54 ft 6 in)
- Diameter: 1.28 m (4 ft 2 in)
- Warhead: Exoatmospheric Kill Vehicle
- Engine: Solid-fuel booster, liquid-fuel vehicle
- Operational range: 5,300 km (3,300 mi) (in testing only)
- Maximum speed: Over 27,500 km/h (17,100 mph); Mach 33
- Guidance system: Inertial + imaging infrared
- Launch platform: Silo

The Ground-Based Interceptor (GBI) is the anti-ballistic missile component of the United States' Ground-Based Midcourse Defense (GMD) system. It is designed to intercept intercontinental ballistic missiles.

== Description ==
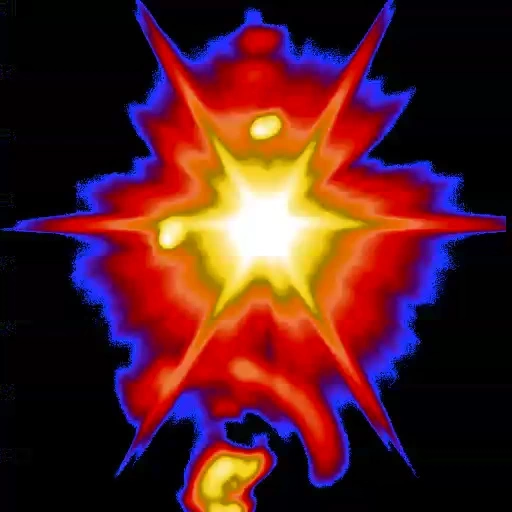
A US Exoatmospheric Kill Vehicle from a Ground-Based Interceptor missile destroys a high-altitude target, 2019

This interceptor is made up of a boost vehicle, constructed by Orbital Sciences Corporation, and an Exoatmospheric Kill Vehicle (EKV), built by Raytheon. Integration of these is performed by Boeing Defense, Space & Security.

The three-stage Orbital Boost Vehicle (OBV) uses the solid-fuel rocket upper stages of the Taurus launcher. The interceptor version deployed in the U.S. has three stages. A two-stage version was successfully tested in 2010 for use in Europe's NATO missile defence as a backup option to the preferred Aegis System Standard Missile 3. In two tests in 2003, the interceptor reached ranges of 5,300 km and altitudes of 1,770 km.

A total of 64 interceptors are planned: 30 interceptors were deployed at the end of 2010 at Fort Greely, Alaska and Vandenberg Space Force Base in California, with 14 additional missiles deployed by 2017, and 20 more GBIs planned.

Since 2006, the Missile Defense Agency (MDA) conducted seven intercept tests with the operationally configured missile, the most recent four of which were successful.

The FY2021 NDAA (National Defense Authorization Act for Fiscal Year 2021, which was released 3 December 2020) has mandated that the Missile Defense Agency commence development of 20 interim GBIs. The interim GBIs are to meet the requirements for the Redesigned Kill Vehicle (RKV —canceled 21 August 2019), (Note: The Missile Defense Agency cancelled the $5.8 billion contract for the Redesigned kill vehicle (RKV) on 21 Aug 2019. These citations stem from the US Army Futures Command article.) at minimum:

- Vehicle-to-vehicle communications
- Ability to assess kills, and counter counter-measures
- Producible
- Use mature technology, with the ability to integrate with non-GBIs (see below)

The interim GBIs are to be completely fielded by 2026, according to the FY2021 NDAA.

On 1 August 2022, the Missile Defense Agency awarded Northrop Grumman a contract to upgrade the GMD Weapon System (GWS) to modernize code for the Ground-based interceptors (GBIs) hardware (by 2026), as their successor Next generation interceptors (NGIs) are made available (on or before 2026). The software upgrades allow the GBIs new capabilities to complement the NGIs. On 31 August 2022, the MDA awarded Boeing a GMD contract for attendant system integration, test and readiness (SITR) work.

== Next Generation Interceptor (NGI) program ==
The Missile Defense Agency leads the development of anti-ballistic missiles for North America. The Next Generation Interceptor (NGI) is a MDA program to upgrade the kill vehicles for the ground-based interceptors, with different vendors, Lockheed Martin and Northrop Grumman competing. They are tasked with meeting more complex threats than those met by the EKV. There will be more near-term technology improvement to the GBI during a longer-term process for NGI to meet more complex threats. The NGIs are to be fielded by 2027 or 2028.

The Pentagon's Office of Cost and Program Evaluation (CAPE) estimated on April 29, 2021, that it would cost $17.7 billion to develop, deploy, and maintain the next-generation interceptor (NGI). This includes billions to build a total of 21 NGIs, each costing at least $74 million, and maybe more depending on the exact allocation of funding for the program. As part of the first phase, the Missile Defense Agency allocated $7.6 billion in contract money to Northrop Grumman (in partnership with Raytheon) and Lockheed Martin to upgrade aging ground-based interceptors (GBIs).

On 12 September 2021 a test of the GBI, which is designed to use a three-stage booster, successfully met its goal of operating as a two-stage booster for an EKV.

Think of it as just telling the third stage not to fire, which allows the kill vehicle to open its eyes, unbuckle its seatbelt, and get to work that much sooner. It trades the speed that the third stage would add for time. And that translates to flexibility.—Tom Karako

The tracking sensors and computers (whether they be C2BMC, or IBCS, etc.), which follow the parabolic trajectories of the ballistic missile, count down the time to go needed before impact of the interceptor's kill vehicle with the targeted ballistic missile. When the tracking sensors and computers determine there is enough time to kill the ballistic missile without using the third booster stage, the kill vehicle can maneuver using its thrusters to hit the targeted ballistic missile without the third stage. This increases the probability of kill, for the kill vehicle, which can instead more closely follow the targeted missile, rather than its projected parabolic trajectory.

As described, the NGI is being engineered to handle more complex situations to be able to hit maneuverable targets.

On 11 December 2023 a two-stage GBI intercepted an IRBM for the first time, using integrated sensor data from the RTX AN/TPY-2 in forward-based mode, and from the Sea-based X-band radar.

On 15 April 2024, Lockheed Martin was selected over Northrop Grumman and awarded a $17 billion contract to develop the Next Generation Interceptor.

== See also ==
- Comparison of anti-ballistic missile systems
