= Exoatmospheric Kill Vehicle =

Interceptor part of the Ground-Based Midcourse Defense manufactured by Raytheon

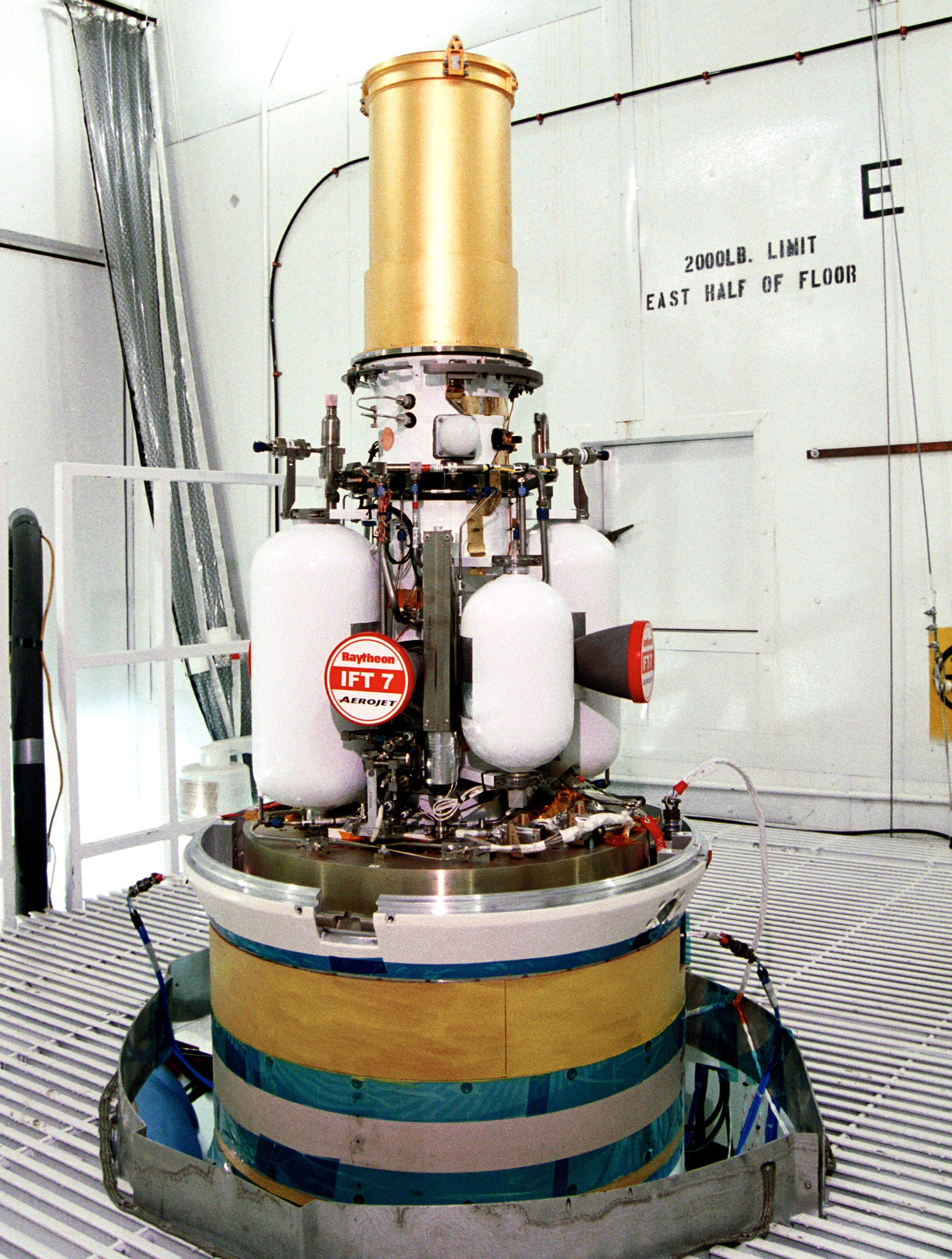
Exoatmospheric Kill Vehicle prototype

The Exoatmospheric Kill Vehicle (EKV) is a Raytheon-manufactured interceptor component with subcontractor Aerojet of the U.S. Ground-Based Midcourse Defense (GMD), part of the larger National Missile Defense system.

== Interceptor ==
The EKV is boosted to an intercept trajectory by a boost vehicle (missile), where it separates from the boost vehicle and autonomously collides with an incoming warhead.

The EKV is launched by the Ground-Based Interceptor (GBI) missile, the launch vehicle of the GMD system. The EKV's own rockets and fuel are for corrections in the trajectory, not for further acceleration.

The successor to the EKV, known as the Redesigned Kill Vehicle (RKV), was scheduled to debut in 2025. The RKV program, headed by Boeing and lead subcontractor Raytheon, was canceled by the Department of Defense on August 21, 2019. Earlier in the year, the Pentagon had issued a stop work order on the project following a design review deferment in December 2018 due to the failure of critical components meeting technical specification.

Raytheon is contracted to sustain, upgrade, and repair the EKV through 2034 until after the deployment of the Next Generation Interceptor (NGI), which will start to replace the EKV in 2030.

=== Characteristics ===
- Weight: approx. 140 lb (64 kg)
- Length: 55 in (4 ft. 7 in.) (1.4 m)
- Diameter: 24 in (2 ft.) (0.6 m)
- Speed of projectile: roughly 10 km/s (22,000 mph)

== See also ==
- Anti-ballistic missile
- Exoatmospheric Reentry-vehicle Interceptor Subsystem
- Lightweight Exo-Atmospheric Projectile
