= Lightweight Exo-Atmospheric Projectile =

Anti-ballistic missile weapon

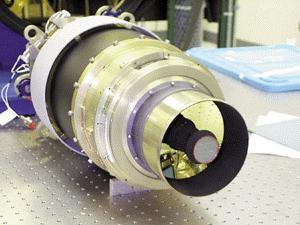
Lightweight Exo-atmospheric Projectile

The Lightweight Exo-atmospheric Projectile (LEAP) is a lightweight miniaturized kinetic kill vehicle designed to destroy incoming ballistic missiles both inside and outside the Earth's atmosphere. The warhead is delivered to the interception point by a system such as the Aegis Ballistic Missile Defense System.

== History ==
Development began in 1985 by the Strategic Defense Initiative Organization, which pioneered the development of miniaturized kill vehicle technology. It was originally created by the now-defunct Hughes Aircraft Company; the modern versions are developed and built by Raytheon such as in the U.S Navy's SM-3 SAMs.

== See also ==
- Exoatmospheric Kill Vehicle
