= Ground-Based Midcourse Defense =

United States anti-ballistic missile system

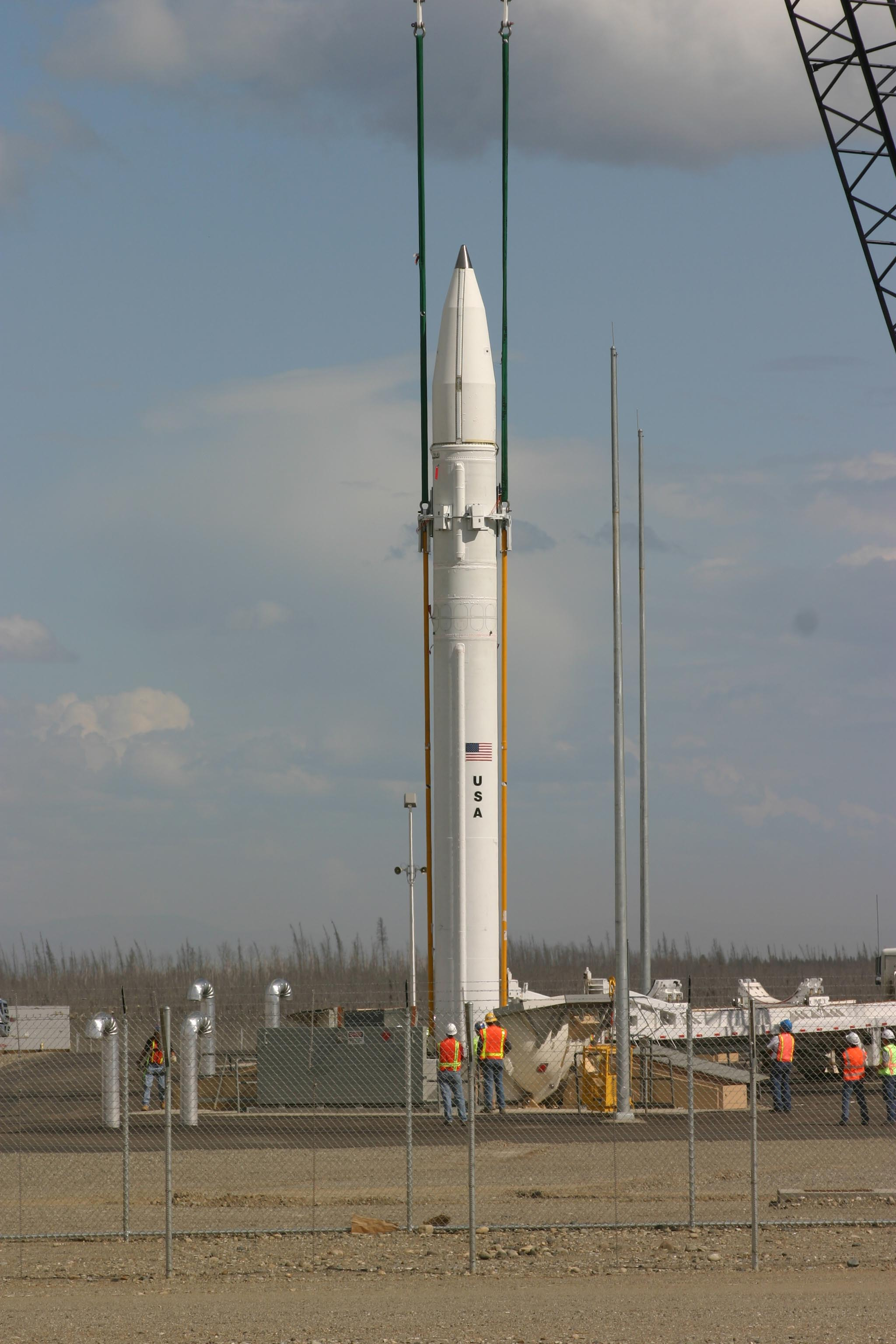
A Ground-Based Interceptor loaded into a silo at Fort Greely, Alaska in July 2004.

Ground-Based Midcourse Defense (GMD), previously National Missile Defense (NMD), is an anti-ballistic missile system implemented by the United States of America for defense against ballistic missiles, during the midcourse phase of ballistic trajectory flight. It is a major component of the American missile defense strategy to counter ballistic missiles, including intercontinental ballistic missiles (ICBMs) carrying nuclear, chemical, biological or conventional warheads.

As of 2018, the system is composed of two interceptor staging bases in the states of Alaska and California, with 40 staged in the former, 4 staged in the latter, for a total of 44 interceptors, as well as the component early warning and targeting sensors based on land, sea, and in orbit. As of 2019, a Missile Defense Review has requested 20 additional interceptors to be based in Fort Greely, Alaska, though their delivery has not materialized.

GMD is administered by the U.S. Missile Defense Agency (MDA), while operational control is provided by the U.S. Army, with support functions provided by the U.S. Air Force and U.S. Space Force.

== Background ==
GMD after its renaming in 2002 remains a limited defense system, intended to protect the continental United States from limited launches of ballistic missiles. Examples given in the past have included countries such as North Korea.

GMD has undergone some controversy over its operational lifetime, such as with a study in 2000 by the Union of Concerned Scientists and the Security Studies Program at the Massachusetts Institute of Technology concluding that "[a]ny country capable of deploying a long-range missile would also be able to deploy countermeasures that would defeat the planned NMD system." Countermeasures studied in detail were bomblets containing biological or chemical agents, aluminized balloons to serve as decoys and to disguise warheads, and cooling warheads to reduce the kill vehicle's ability to detect them. Currently, the Union of Concerned Scientists maintains that GMD is "unproven, unaccountable, and unhelpful for reducing the nuclear threat."

More recently, questions have been asked about the Pentagon characterizing the January 28 test in 2016 as a success, when LA Times reported that the EKV suffered a fault in its reaction control system thrusters, which resulted in "a distance 20 times greater than what was expected" according to an anonymous Pentagon scientist.

Under the Missile Defense Agency, GMD has conducted multiple test exercises, with mixed results. Early testing revealed deficiencies in the Ground Based Interceptor missile, as well as the Exoatmospheric Kill Vehicle. However, with time, success rates increased, marred by the occasional technical failure such as in 2010's FTG-06 (Flight Test Ground-Based Interceptor) where the Sea-based X Band Radar failed to perform as expected, and the subsequent FTG-06a where despite all elements performing correctly, intercept failed to occur.

== Description ==
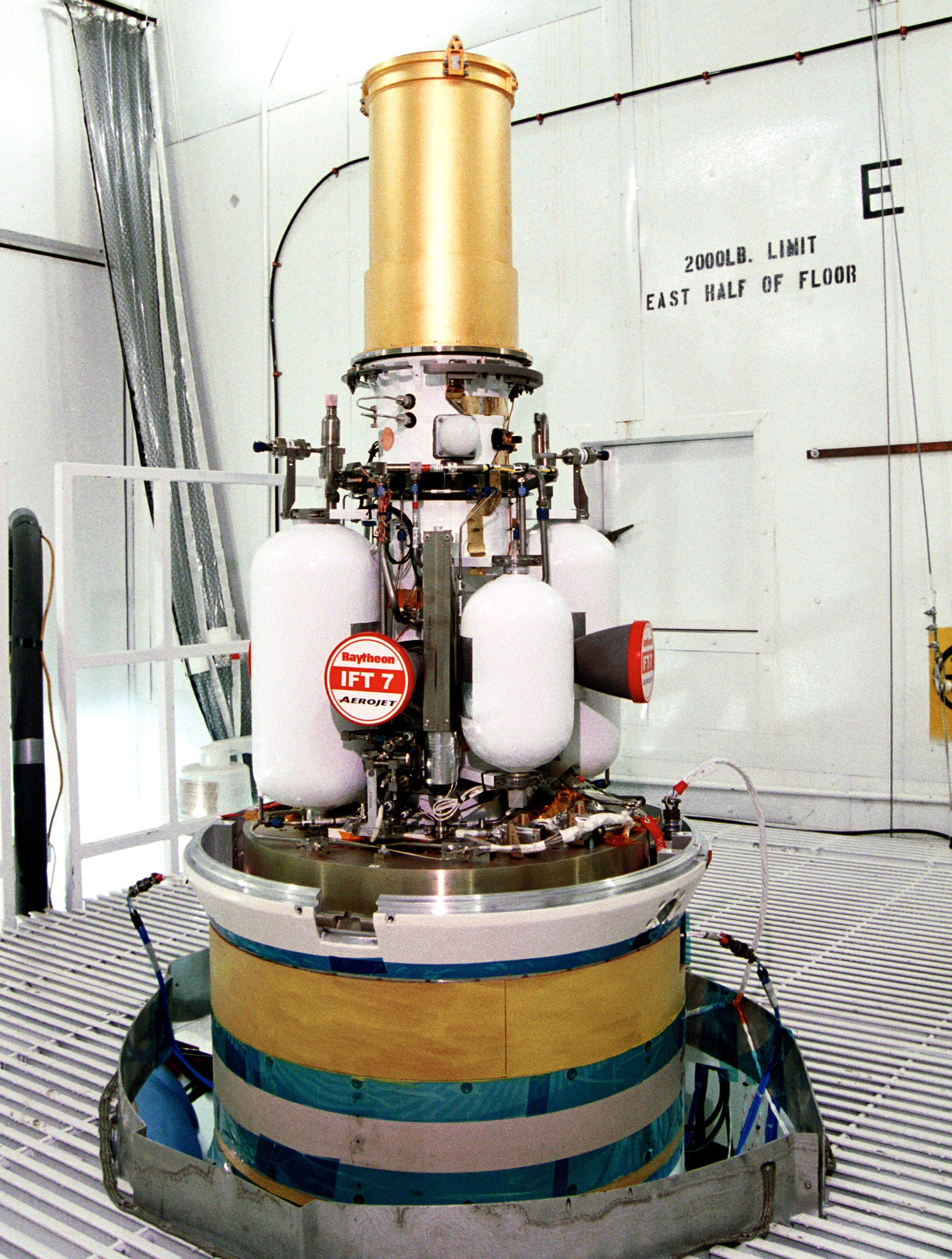
Prototype of the Exoatmospheric Kill Vehicle

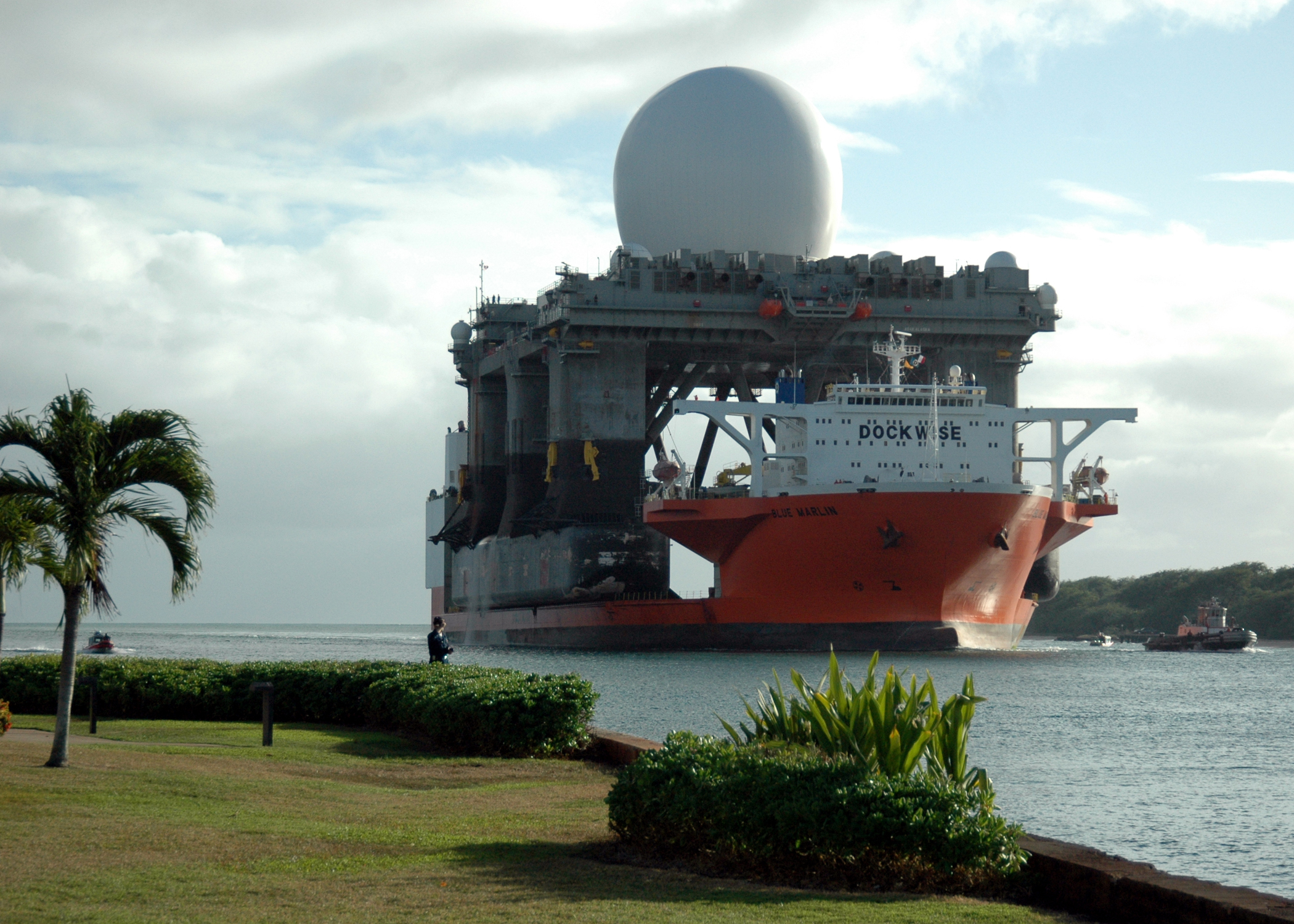
Sea-based X-band Radar platform arriving in Pearl Harbor in January 2006.

GMD is tied into existing United States missile warning infrastructure, as well as purpose-built radar sites. It also encompasses 44 ground-based missile interceptors housed at two military bases.

Boeing Defense, Space & Security is the prime contractor of the program, tasked to oversee and integrate systems from other major defense sub-contractors, such as Computer Sciences Corporation and Raytheon.

The key sub-systems of the GMD system are:

- Exoatmospheric Kill Vehicle (EKV) – Raytheon
- Ground-Based Interceptor (GBI) – boost vehicle built by Orbital Sciences; for every interceptor missile there is a missile silo and a silo interface vault (SIV), which is an underground electronics room adjacent to the silo.
- Battle management command, control and communications (BMC3) – Northrop Grumman
- Ground-based radars (GBR) – Raytheon
- AN/FPS-132 Upgraded Early Warning Radar (UEWR) – Raytheon
- Forward-based X band radars (FBXB), such as the sea-based X-band platform and the AN/TPY-2 — Raytheon

Interceptor sites are at Fort Greely, Alaska and Vandenberg Space Force Base, California. A third site was planned for a proposed US missile defense complex in Poland, but was canceled in September 2009.

In late 2013, there were plans for a proposed Eastern United States site to house a battery of these missiles. Four sites were shortlisted in January 2014 for an East Coast site - SERE Remote Training Site in Maine (Rangeley), Fort Drum in New York, Camp James A. Garfield in Ohio, and Fort Custer Training Center in Michigan. Camp Ethan Allen Training Site in Vermont was dropped from consideration in late 2013.

In January 2014 the Pentagon announced they were starting a two-year environmental impact study under the 2013 defense authorization bill, which required two missile-defense sites to be identified on the East Coast. The CBO has estimated that a site would cost US$3.5bn.

In June 2019, Fort Drum in New York was chosen as the location for the potential East Coast missile defense site.

In December 2008, the U.S. Missile Defense Agency awarded Boeing a $397.9 million contract to continue development of the program.

In March 2013, the Obama administration announced plans to add 14 interceptors to the current 26 at Fort Greely in response to North Korean threats. The deployment of a second TPY-2 radar to Japan was announced at the same time. While President Obama said that the additional deployment was a hedge against unexpected capabilities, Chinese Ministry of Foreign Affairs spokesman Hong Lei complained that the additional defenses would affect the global strategic balance and strategic trust.

On 30 April 2014, the Government Accountability Office issued a report stating that the system may not be operational any time soon because "its development was flawed". It said the GBI missile was at that point "capable of intercepting a simple threat in a limited way". On 12 August 2015, Lt. General David L. Mann (commanding general USASMDC/ARSTRAT) characterized GMD as the nation's only ground-based defense against limited ICBM attacks.

Issues with the EKV prompted the MDA to work with Raytheon, Boeing, and Lockheed Martin on a new Redesigned Kill Vehicle (RKV), scheduled to debut in 2025. In 2019, the government issued a stop work order for the RKV after recent test results indicated that the current RKV plan is not viable. The government "initiated an analysis of alternative courses of action"; on 21 August the MDA cancelled the $5.8 billion contract for the RKV. This initiates new work on bids for the successor to the Exo-Atmospheric Kill Vehicle (EKV) to 2025. The current GMD programs continue per plan, with up to 64 GBIs (meaning an additional 20) in the missile fields for 2019.

== Program costs ==
Expenditures on the Ground-Based Midcourse Defense program were estimated to be US$30.7 billion by 2007. In 2013, it was estimated that the program would cost $40.926 billion from inception through fiscal year 2017; in 2013–17 spending was to total $4.46 billion, an average of $892 million per year.

== Flight tests ==
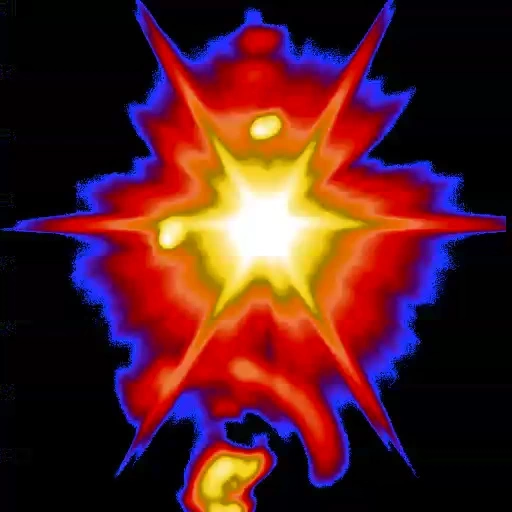
A US Exoatmospheric Kill Vehicle from a Ground-Based Interceptor missile destroys a high-altitude target, 2019

BV: Booster Verification Test
CMCM: Critical Measurements and Countermeasures
CTV: Control Test Vehicle
FTG: Flight Test Ground-Based Interceptor
FTX: Flight Test Other
IFT: Integrated Flight Test

=== Intercept tests ===
After the FTG-12 test on 11 December 2023, 12 of the 21 (57%) hit-to-kill intercept tests have succeeded. No flight intercept tests from 2010 to 2013 were successful. In response the Pentagon asked for a budget increase and another test for the fielded program. The successful intercept FTG-15 was accomplished by an operational team of the 100th Missile Defense Brigade using their standard operating procedures (round-the-clock 24/7). Although they knew in advance that there would be a test launch, they did not know exactly when it would occur or its exact nature.

Name	date	Result	Description
IFT-3	2 Oct 1999	Success	This was an element test of the EKV that relied on a surrogate booster vehicle. Because the Inertial Measurement Unit malfunctioned, the EKV used a backup acquisition mode to acquire the target.
IFT-4	18 Jan 2000	Failure	This was the first end-to-end system test, again relying on a surrogate booster vehicle. The test was designed to target a mock warhead, transmitting its location by GPS, and ignore a single large decoy balloon. The failure to intercept was traced to an obstructed cooling line on the EKV that disrupted the IR sensors' ability to cool down to their operating temperatures in time, leaving the EKV unable to detect its target.
IFT-5	8 Jul 2000	Failure	This was the second end-to-end system test. The test was designed to target a mock warhead, transmitting its location by C-band, and ignore a single large decoy balloon. The failure to intercept occurred because the EKV did not separate from the boost vehicle due to an apparent failure of the 1553 data bus in the booster.
IFT-6	14 Jul 2001	Success	This test repeated IFT-5. The prototype X-Band radar falsely reported a missed target but was confirmed by a satellite, jet, and ground stations.
IFT-7	3 Dec 2001	Success	This test repeated IFT-6 except that the target booster used Orbital's Target Launch Vehicle instead of Lockheed Martin's Multi-Service Launch System.
IFT-8	15 Mar 2002	Success	The test was designed to target a mock warhead, transmitting its location by C-band, and ignore both a large decoy balloon and two small decoy balloons.
IFT-9	14 Oct 2002	Success	Twice delayed from August, this was the first test to use the Aegis SPY-1 radar, although it was not used to achieve the intercept. After the classification of decoys since May 2002, no information is known on their details.
IFT-10	11 Dec 2002	Failure	The failure to intercept occurred because the EKV did not separate from the boost vehicle because a pin broke that should have activated a laser to release the boost vehicle's restraining units.
IFT-13C	15 Dec 2004	Failure	Delayed several times from December 2003 due to bad circuitry, this test was designed to use the Orbital Sciences booster from Kwajalein to hit a target from Kodiak, Alaska. The target flew as planned but the booster failed to leave the ground. The failure was traced to a software problem on the 1553 communications data bus, which may be incapable of processing messages at a rate that is fast enough for the GMD system to work effectively.
IFT-14	13 Feb 2005	Failure	This test repeated IFT-13C, with a booster from Kwajalein designed to hit a target from Kodiak, Alaska. Again, the target flew as planned but the booster failed to leave the ground. The failure was traced to the arms that hold the interceptor up in the silo. When they failed to fully retract, the launch was automatically aborted.
FTG-02	1 Sep 2006	Success	This test involved the first ground-based interceptor launched from Vandenberg Air Force Base to intercept a "threat-representative" target from Kodiak, Alaska. This was the first time that operational radar was used to capture targeting information. Not officially an intercept test, this was originally designed to collect data on the phenomenology of the intercept and act as a radar certification test. No decoys were used.
FTG-03	25 May 2007	Failure	With the same setup as FTG-02, the test target flew off-course and an intercept did not occur.
FTG-03A	28 Sep 2007	Success	This test was scheduled in response to the failure of FTG-03, this time with a successful intercept.
FTG-05	5 Dec 2008	Success	This test launched a threat-representative mock warhead from Kodiak Launch Complex, Alaska followed by a Ground-Based Interceptor from Vandenberg AFB. All components performed as designed.
FTG-06	31 Jan 2010	Failure	This test was to be the first to assess both a CE-II EKV and a complex target scene and the first test to use a newly developed FTF LV-2 target. While the target missile and interceptor launched and performed nominally, the Sea Based X-Band Radar did not perform as expected, and an investigation will explain the failure to intercept.
FTG-06a	15 Dec 2010	Failure	This test was similar to FTG-06, over a distance of 4,200 miles. While the Sea Based X-Band radar and all sensors performed as planned, the test was unable to achieve the planned intercept of a ballistic missile target.
FTG-07	5 Jul 2013	Failure	This intercept test used an improved CE-I EKV.
FTG-06b	22 Jun 2014	Success	This test is designed to demonstrate an intercept and meet the unmet objectives of FTG-06a.
FTG-15	30 May 2017	Success	The test involved the new CE-II Block-I version of the EKV, which executed a direct collision with the ICBM target.
FTG-11	25 Mar 2019	Success	This test used two interceptors, one to crash into a dummy target representing an incoming ICBM and another to use sensors to detect another ICBM or other countermeasures.
FTG-12	11 Dec 2023	Success	This test used a CE-II EKV and was the first test of a three-stage GBI operating in a two-stage mode—releasing its kill vehicle earlier by not igniting the GBI's third stage. It was launched from Vandenberg Space Force Base and successfully intercepted an IRBM deployed from a C-17 aircraft over the Pacific Ocean.

=== Non-intercept tests ===
Name	date	Result	Description
IFT-1A	24 Jun 1997	Success	This test allowed the program to assess the Boeing EKV seeker's ability to collect target phenomenological data, and evaluate target modeling and discrimination algorithms for a cluster of 10 objects.
IFT-2	16 Jan 1998	Success	This test allowed the program to assess the Raytheon EKV seeker's ability to collect target phenomenological data, and evaluate target modeling and discrimination algorithms for a cluster of 10 objects. As a result, Raytheon was selected over Boeing and was awarded the EKV contract.
BV-1	28 Apr 2001	Success	This was a ground test to certify the procedures that lead to an actual flight test, including all ground and safety checks as well as launch and safety steps. The missile was not launched.
BV-2	31 Aug 2001	Success	This was a flight test of three-stage Boeing Booster Vehicle with a mass-simulated kill vehicle payload. An anomaly occurred in the first-stage vehicle roll control, but the second- and third-stage motors performed normally.
BV-3	13 Dec 2001	Failure	This flight test resulted in failure when the Boeing Booster Vehicle steered off course 30 seconds after launch and was then ordered to self-destruct off the coast of California.
BV-6	16 Aug 2003	Success	This was a flight test of the three-stage Orbital Sciences Booster Vehicle with a mass-simulated kill vehicle payload. The launch from Vandenberg Air Force Base proceeded normally over the Pacific Ocean.
BV-5	9 Jan 2004	Failure	This flight test of the Lockheed Martin Booster Vehicle with a mass-simulated kill vehicle payload resulted in failure due to an apparent power drop that prevented the mock EKV from separating from the booster. The flight was delayed by the third-stage rocket motor's circuit boards.
IFT-13B	26 Jan 2004	Success	This was a system-level test of the Orbital Sciences booster carrying a simulated EKV from Kwajalein Atoll against a simulated target from Vandenberg AFB in California.
Medium-range air-launch target	8 Apr 2005	Success	This test featured a C-17 dropping a medium-range target from its rear, 800 miles (1,300 km) northwest of the Pacific Missile Range Facility in Hawaii.
CMCM-1A/FT 04-2A	4 Aug 2005	Success	This test was the first of two medium-range target vehicles.
CMCM-1B/FT 04-2B	18 Aug 2005	Success	This test was the second of two medium-range target vehicles.
FT 04-5/FTG 04-5	26 Sep 2005	Success	This test was an apparent variant of IFT-19 and featured an air-launched long-range target tracked by Cobra Dane radar.
FT-1	13 Dec 2005	Success	Originally designed as IFT-13A, this test featured an interceptor missile from the Ronald Reagan test site in the Marshall Islands to hit a target from Kodiak, Alaska. The operationally configured warhead and its booster left the ground successfully.
FTX-01/FT 04-1	23 Feb 2006	Success	Originally designed as IFT-16, then changed to a radar characterization flight test as IFT-16A, then FT 04-1, then FTX-01. This test incorporated radar and targets testing.
CMCM-2B/FTC-02B	13 Apr 2006	Success	This test was a radar certification flight and featured a missile system powered by a two-stage SR-19 rocket flown from the Kauai Test Facility in the Pacific Missile Range Facility. The payload included complex countermeasures, a mock reentry vehicle, and on-board sensor package.
CMCM-2A/FTC-02A	28 Apr 2006	Success	This test repeated FTC-02B to test its radars in the Pacific Missile Range Facility in Hawaii against a target missile that carried countermeasures, a mock warhead, and an on-board sensor package.
FTX-02	27 Mar 2007	Partial success	This test of the Sea-Based X-Band Radar revealed "anomalous behavior", and demonstrated a need for software modifications to improve performance.
FTX-03	18 Jul 2008	Success	This test demonstrated the integration of missile defense sensors to support an interceptor engagement. This revealed the success of the Sea-Based X-Band Radar to be used in future missions.
BVT-01	6 Jun 2010	Success	A two-stage Ground-Based Interceptor successfully launched from Vandenberg Air Force Base, and after separating from the second-stage booster, the exoatmospheric kill vehicle executed a variety of maneuvers to collect data to further prove its performance in space. All components performed as designed.
GM CTV-01	26 Jan 2013	Success	The three-stage booster deployed the Exoatmospheric Kill Vehicle to a point in space and executed a variety of pre-planned maneuvers to collect performance data. Initial indications are that all components performed as designed.
GM CTV-02	28 Jan 2016	Failure	A long-range ground-based interceptor was launched from Vandenberg Air Force Base to evaluate performance of alternate divert thrusters for the system's Exoatmospheric Kill Vehicle. The test had planned for the interceptor to fly within a narrow "miss distance" of its target to test the new thrusters' effectiveness. The U.S. military initially stated the test had been a success. But the closest the interceptor came to the target was a distance 20 times greater than what was expected. One of the four thrusters stopped working during the maneuvers, and the interceptor peeled away from its intended course, according to the Pentagon scientists. One of them said the thruster remained inoperable through the final, "homing phase" of the test, when the kill vehicle was supposed to make a close fly-by of the target. MDA acknowledged that a problem surfaced during 28 January exercise: "There was an observation unrelated to the new thruster hardware that has been investigated and successfully root-caused," the agency said in a written response to questions. "Any necessary corrective actions will be taken for the next flight test."

=== Canceled tests ===
Throughout the program's history, multiple test flights have been canceled, including BV-4, IFT-11, −12, −13, −13A, −15, FTC-03, and, most recently, FTG-04.

== Estimated effectiveness ==
The system has a "single shot probability of kill" of its interceptors calculated at 56%, with the claimed total probability of intercepting a single target, if four interceptors are launched, at 97%. Each interceptor costs approximately $75 million.

The claim of "97% kill probability" has been dismissed by some experts as a flawed application of basic statistical methods. Said James M. Acton, co-director of the Nuclear Policy Program at the Carnegie Endowment for International Peace, "It assumes that the failure modes of the interceptors are independent of one another. But, in practice, if one interceptor fails because of a design flaw, say, it's much more likely that others will do so too for the same reason."

== See also ==
- Terminal High Altitude Area Defense – (United States) (THAAD), mobile land-based missile defense system
- Medium Extended Air Defense System – (United States, Germany, Italy), mobile land-based air and missile defense system
- Aegis Ballistic Missile Defense System – (United States), sea-based missile defense system
- A-135 anti-ballistic missile system – (Soviet Union)
- A-235 anti-ballistic missile system – (Russia)
- S-300VM missile system – (Russia)
- S-400 missile system – (Soviet Union, Russia)
- S-500 missile system – (Russia)
- HQ-19 – (China)
- SC-19 – (China)
- Arrow – (Israel)
  - Arrow 3 – (Israel)
- Comparison of anti-ballistic missile systems
