= USS Curtis Wilbur =

Arleigh Burke-class destroyer

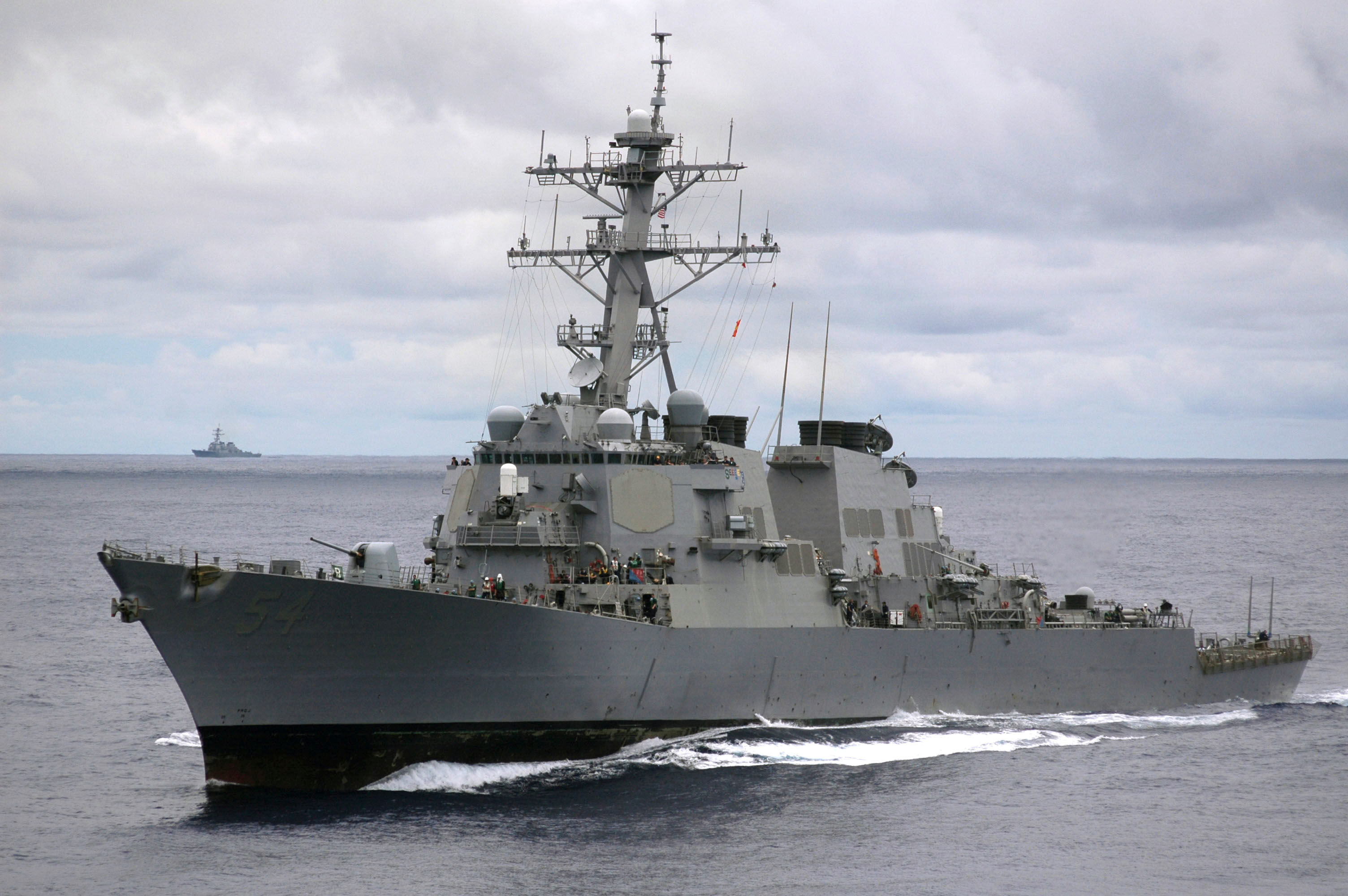
- USS Curtis Wilbur (DDG-54)

History

United States
- Name: Curtis Wilbur
- Namesake: Curtis D. Wilbur
- Ordered: 13 December 1988
- Builder: Bath Iron Works
- Laid down: 12 March 1991
- Launched: 16 May 1992
- Commissioned: 19 March 1994
- Home port: San Diego
- Identification: MMSI number: 368765000; Callsign: NCDW; Hull number: DDG-54
- Motto: Prudens Potens Patria; (Judicious Power for Country)
- Nickname(s): Steel Hammer of the Republic
- Honors and awards: See Awards
- Status: in active service
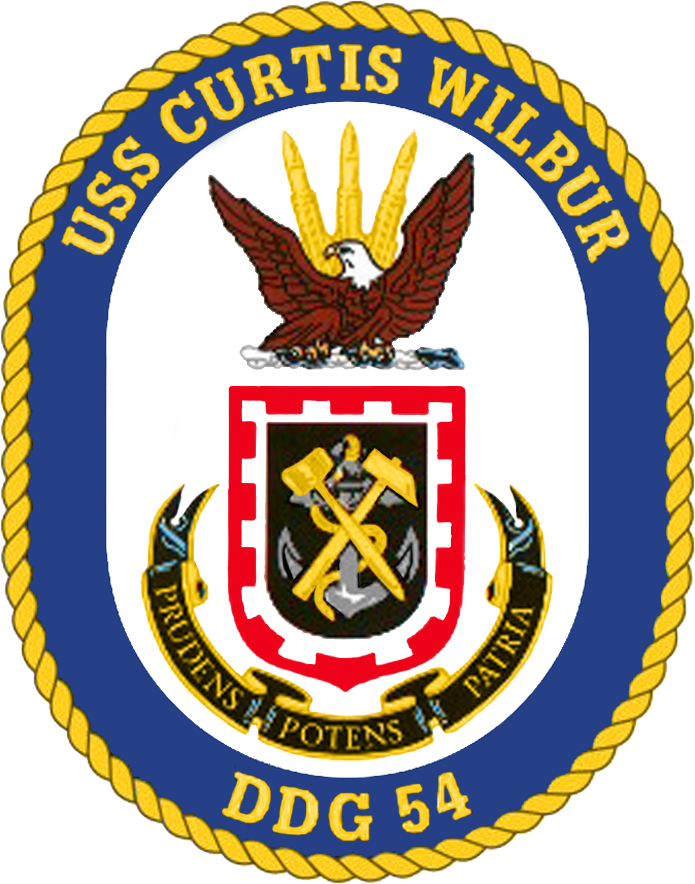
- Badge

General characteristics
- Class & type: Arleigh Burke-class destroyer
- Displacement: Light: approx. 6,800 long tons (6,900 t); Full: approx. 8,900 long tons (9,000 t)
- Length: 505 ft (154 m)
- Beam: 59 ft (18 m)
- Draft: 31 ft (9.4 m)
- Installed power: 4 × General Electric LM2500-30 gas turbines; 100,000 shp (75,000 kW)
- Propulsion: 2 × shafts
- Speed: In excess of 30 kn (56 km/h; 35 mph)
- Range: 4,400 nmi (8,100 km; 5,100 mi) at 20 kn (37 km/h; 23 mph)
- Complement: 33 commissioned officers; 38 chief petty officers; 210 enlisted personnel
- Sensors & processing systems: AN/SPY-1D PESA 3D radar (Flight I, II, IIA); AN/SPY-6(V)1 AESA 3D radar (Flight III); AN/SPS-67(V)3 or (V)5 surface search radar (DDG-51 – DDG-118); AN/SPQ-9B surface search radar (DDG-119 onward); AN/SPS-73(V)12 surface search/navigation radar (DDG-51 – DDG-86); BridgeMaster E surface search/navigation radar (DDG-87 onward); 3 × AN/SPG-62 fire-control radar; Mk 46 optical sight system (Flight I, II, IIA); Mk 20 electro-optical sight system (Flight III); AN/SQQ-89 ASW combat system: AN/SQS-53C sonar array; AN/SQR-19 tactical towed array sonar (Flight I, II, IIA); TB-37U multi-function towed array sonar (DDG-113 onward); AN/SQQ-28 LAMPS III shipboard system
- Electronic warfare & decoys: AN/SLQ-32 electronic warfare suite; AN/SLQ-25 Nixie torpedo countermeasures; Mk 36 Mod 12 decoy launching systems; Mk 53 Nulka decoy launching systems; Mk 59 decoy launching systems
- Armament: Guns: 1 × 5-inch (127 mm)/54 mk 45 mod 1/2 (lightweight gun); 2 × 20 mm (0.8 in) Phalanx CIWS; 2 × 25 mm (0.98 in) Mk 38 machine gun system; 4 × 0.50 inches (12.7 mm) caliber guns; Missiles: 2 × Mk 141 Harpoon anti-ship missile launcher; 1 × 29-cell, 1 × 61-cell (90 total cells) Mk 41 vertical launching system (VLS): RIM-66M surface-to-air missile; RIM-156 surface-to-air missile; BGM-109 Tomahawk cruise missile; RUM-139 vertical launch ASROC; Torpedoes: 2 × Mark 32 triple torpedo tubes: Mark 46 lightweight torpedo; Mark 50 lightweight torpedo; Mark 54 lightweight torpedo

USS Curtis Wilbur (DDG-54) is an Arleigh Burke-class (Flight I) Aegis guided missile destroyer. Curtis Wilbur was named for Curtis D. Wilbur, 43rd Secretary of the Navy, who served under President Calvin Coolidge. In 2016, she was based at Yokosuka, Japan, as part of Destroyer Squadron 15.

Built by Bath Iron Works in Bath, Maine, she was commissioned in Long Beach, California, on 19 March 1994. The keynote speaker for the ceremony was then-Secretary of the Navy, John H. Dalton.

== Service history ==
=== 1990s ===
In mid 1994, Curtis Wilbur participated in RIMPAC '94, a major multi-national exercise involving more than thirty ships as well as numerous submarines and air assets, both carrier- and land-based. During this exercise, she performed duties as Force Air Defense Coordinator. Also that summer, the Board of Inspection and Survey conducted Final Contract Trials to assess the material status of the ship. Curtis Wilbur became the first ship of the class, and only the second ship ever to complete the examination with zero mission degrading deficiencies. In October 1994, Curtis Wilbur became the first Aegis-equipped ship to integrate women into the crew.

Curtis Wilbur departed on her first Western Pacific Deployment on 31 July 1995, transiting the Pacific and heading to the Persian Gulf. While deployed with the United States Naval Forces Central Command, she supported Operations Southern Watch and Vigilant Sentinel. During her 100 days in theater, she served as Air Warfare Commander, Surface Warfare Commander, Undersea Warfare Commander, and Strike Warfare Commander. Curtis Wilbur also served as a member of the United States Fifth Fleet Expeditionary Task Force supporting United Nations sanctions against Iraq.

In September 1996, Curtis Wilbur became part of the United States Seventh Fleet, shifting homeports from San Diego to Yokosuka Naval Base in Yokosuka, Japan. Upon arrival in Japan, she successfully completed Tailored Ship's Training Availability II and III and was the first ship ever to validate the Final Evaluation Period. On 15 February 1997, she deployed with the Independence Battle Group and participated in exercises Tandem Thrust '97 and Cobra Gold. Curtis Wilbur served as the Air Warfare Commander during this deployment.

Throughout the remainder of 1997, Curtis Wilbur participated in numerous Seventh Fleet exercises, including Javelin Maker, Missilex 97-4, Aswex 97-6JA, Harmex 97-2, Annualex 09G, and Comptuex. For her "contributions to the fleet", Curtis Wilbur was selected as the Destroyer Squadron Fifteen Battle Efficiency Winner for 1997.

In January 1998, Curtis Wilbur participated in Sharem 108-1 before deploying again, on short notice, to the South Pacific. During this deployment, Curtis Wilbur visited ports in Singapore, Australia, Guam, Hong Kong, South Korea and Japan. She also participated in Merlion '98 and the Shimoda Black Ship Festival.

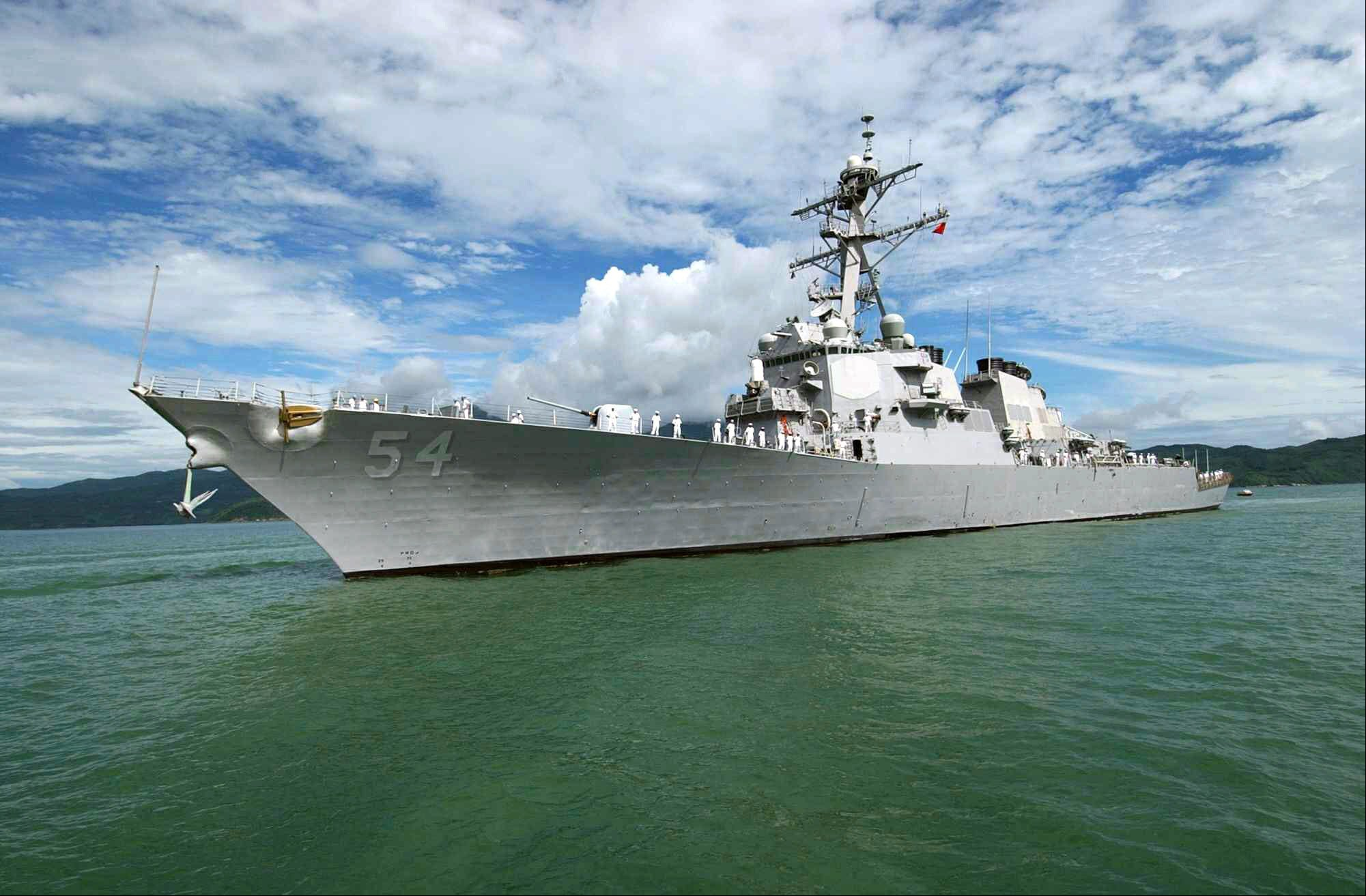
Docked in the port of Da Nang, Vietnam

In June 1998 Curtis Wilbur commenced her second Selected Restricted Availability (SRA) in Yokosuka. This nine-week shipyard period brought with it many new upgrades, including JTIDS (Link 16), JMCIS 98, INMARSAT B, and numerous other Engineering and Combat System upgrades, making her the most capable destroyer in Seventh Fleet. Upon completion of SRA and sea trials in August 1998, in addition to beginning the training cycle, Curtis Wilbur deployed for the joint and combined Exercise FOAL Eagle '98 with the Republic of Korea Navy and completed a successful Cruise Missile Tactical Qualification and Naval Surface Fire Support qualification. During the training cycle the ship certified the Main Space Fire Drill for ECERT at TSTA II and had a near flawless performance during ECERT. After completing her second complete training cycle while forward deployed, Curtis Wilbur participated in Sharem 127 with the Korean Navy and deployed in March 1999 with the Kitty Hawk Battle Group.

After completing Tandem Thrust '99, an annual multi-national training exercise, Curtis Wilbur received immediate tasking to proceed at best speed en route to the Persian Gulf. Steaming in company with Kitty Hawk and Chancellorsville, Curtis Wilbur conducted a no-notice high speed transit and arrived in the Persian Gulf on 18 April 1999. Proceeding directly to the Northern Persian Gulf, Curtis Wilbur commenced operations in support of Operation Southern Watch; enforcing the Southern No-Fly Zone over Iraq and supporting United Nations Sanctions against Iraq by conducting Maritime Interception Operations (MIO) as a member of the Fifth Fleet. Curtis Wilbur also participated in two major exercises while on her second Persian Gulf deployment: Nautical Swimmer '99, a combined exercise with the Royal Saudi Naval Forces, and Sharem 128, an undersea warfare exercise in the North Arabian Sea. Following port visits to Bunbury, Australia and Pattaya, Thailand, Curtis Wilbur returned to Yokosuka, Japan on 25 August 1999.

=== 2000s ===
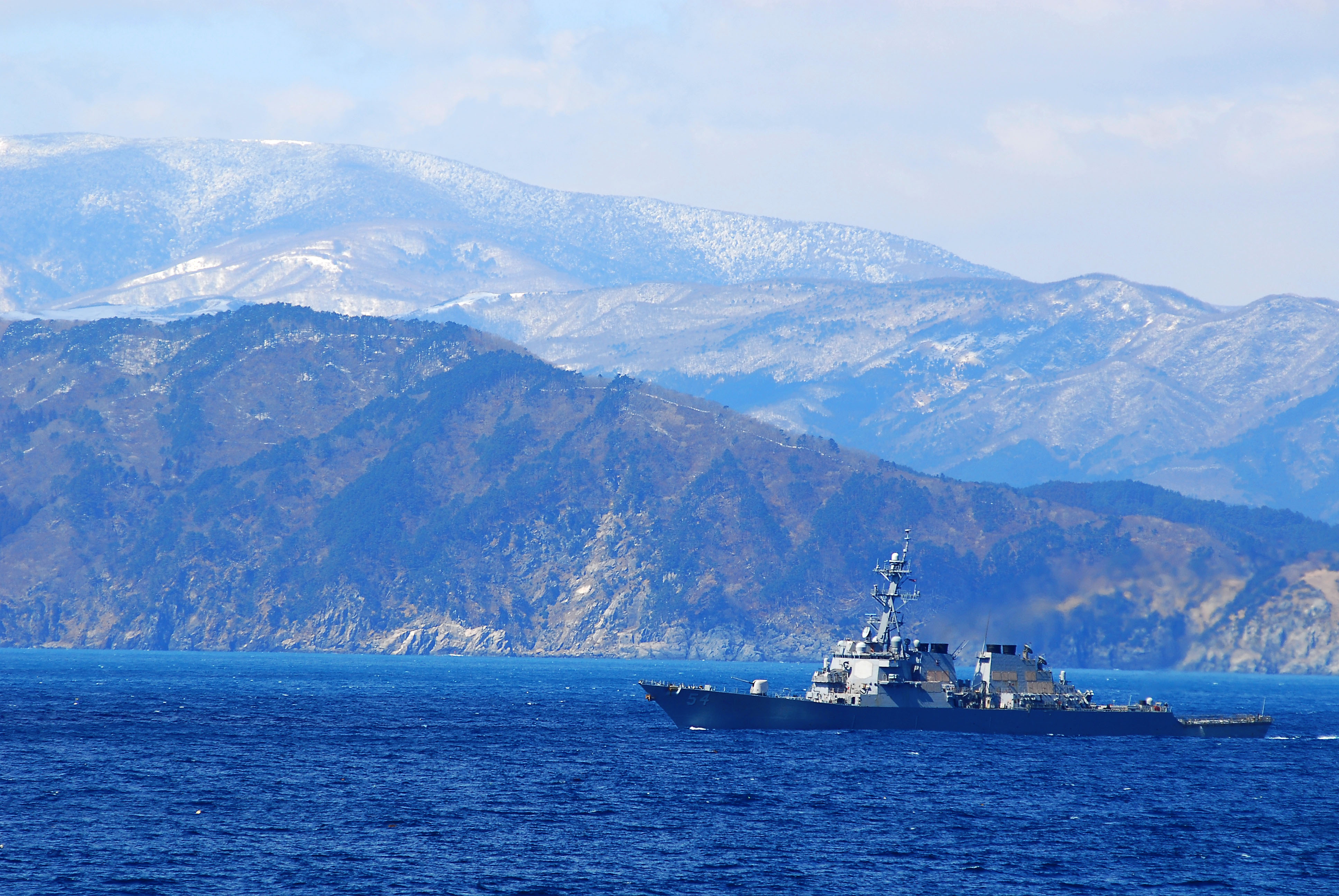
Off the coast of Japan in 2011

Curtis Wilbur became the first of the 28 Flight I and II Arleigh Burke-class destroyers to be retrofitted with a stern flap, which was added in February 2000.

On 1 October 2001, Curtis Wilbur again departed Yokosuka on another deployment. Assigned to the Kitty Hawk Strike Group, she conducted operations in support of Operation Enduring Freedom in the Persian Gulf. After a port visit to Phuket, Thailand, Curtis Wilbur's first port visit in ten months, from 13 to 15 December, the ship returned to Yokosuka on 23 December 2001.

In early February 2002, Curtis Wilbur, along with the landing helicopter dock Essex, cruisers Cowpens, Chancellorsville, destroyers O'Brien, Cushing, John S. McCain, frigates Vandegrift, Gary, and supply vessel John Ericsson along with the Japanese Sagami participated in Missilex '02, an anti-ship missile defense training evolution. The Missilex took place on 7 and 8 February, in a training area off the island of Okinawa, with all the ships participating except John Ericsson and Sagami, which had conducted replenishments at sea with several ships earlier in the exercise.

On 30 June 2007, Curtis Wilbur collided with a Russian Udaloy-class destroyer while docking in Vladivostok, Russia, sustaining minor damage. In March 2011, in company with the aircraft carrier Ronald Reagan, the ship was deployed off northeastern Honshu, Japan to assist with relief efforts after the 2011 Tōhoku earthquake and tsunami. During that time, the ship may have been exposed to leaking radiation from the Fukushima I nuclear accidents.

In January 2016, Curtis Wilbur sailed within 12 nautical miles (22 km; 14 mi) of the disputed Triton Island in the South China Sea as part a planned series of Freedom of navigation operations (also referred to as FONOPs). On 22 October 2018, she transited the Taiwan Strait along with USS Antietam (CG-54). On 25 March 2019, Curtis Wilbur, with USCGC Bertholf transited the Taiwan Strait.On 16 September 2021, Curtis Wilbur arrived at her new home port of San Diego.

Curtis Wilbur responded to a distress call from two boaters stranded off the coast of San Diego, 4 March 2024, rescuing them from the sinking vessel.

== Awards ==
- Navy Unit Commendation – (Jan-May 2003)
- Navy Meritorious Unit Commendation – (Apr-Jul 1999, Jan-Dec 2001, Apr 2012-Dec 2013)
- Battle "E" – (1994, 1997, 2005, 2026)
- Humanitarian Service Medal – (17-28 Feb 2006, Mar-May 2011)
- Spokane Trophy Award – (2008)
- Captain Edward F. Ney Memorial Award – (2013).
- PACFLT Anti-Submarine Warfare (ASW) Bloodhound Award - 2021

== In popular culture ==
- Curtis Wilbur is featured in the 12th episode of the 2010 anime series Highschool of the Dead, failing to respond to radio hails from JS Kongō during a ballistic missile defense, before revealing her crew had succumb to the infection.
