= USS Antietam (CG-54) =

Ticonderoga-class Guided-Missile Cruiser

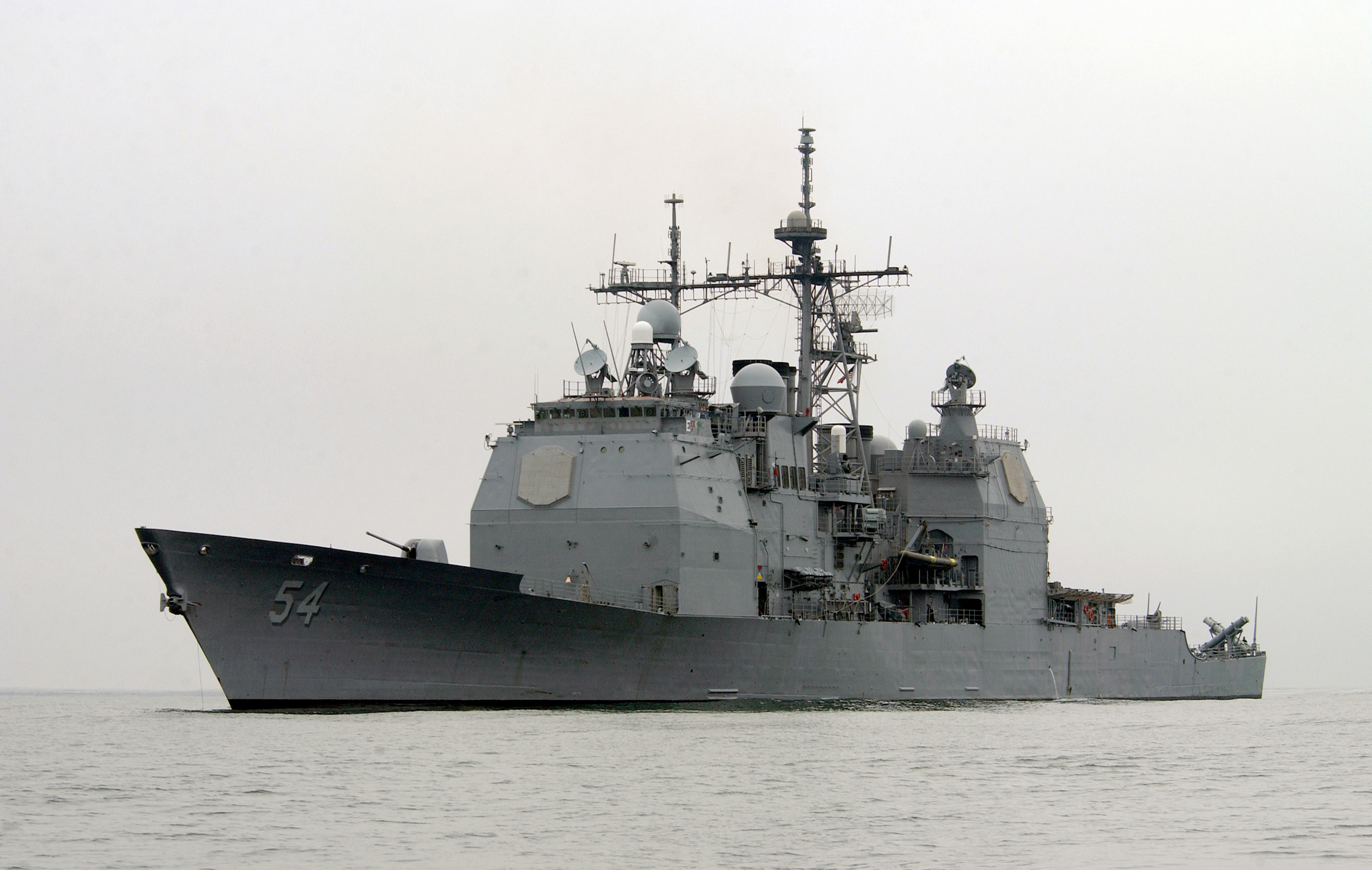
- USS Antietam underway after leaving her homeport of San Diego, California in 2004

History

United States
- Name: Antietam
- Namesake: Battle of Antietam
- Ordered: 20 June 1983
- Builder: Ingalls Shipbuilding, Pascagoula, Mississippi
- Laid down: 15 November 1984
- Launched: 14 February 1986
- Commissioned: 6 June 1987
- Decommissioned: 27 September 2024
- Stricken: 30 September 2024
- Home port: Pearl Harbor, HI
- Identification: Call sign: NATM; Hull number: CG-54
- Motto: Power to Prevail
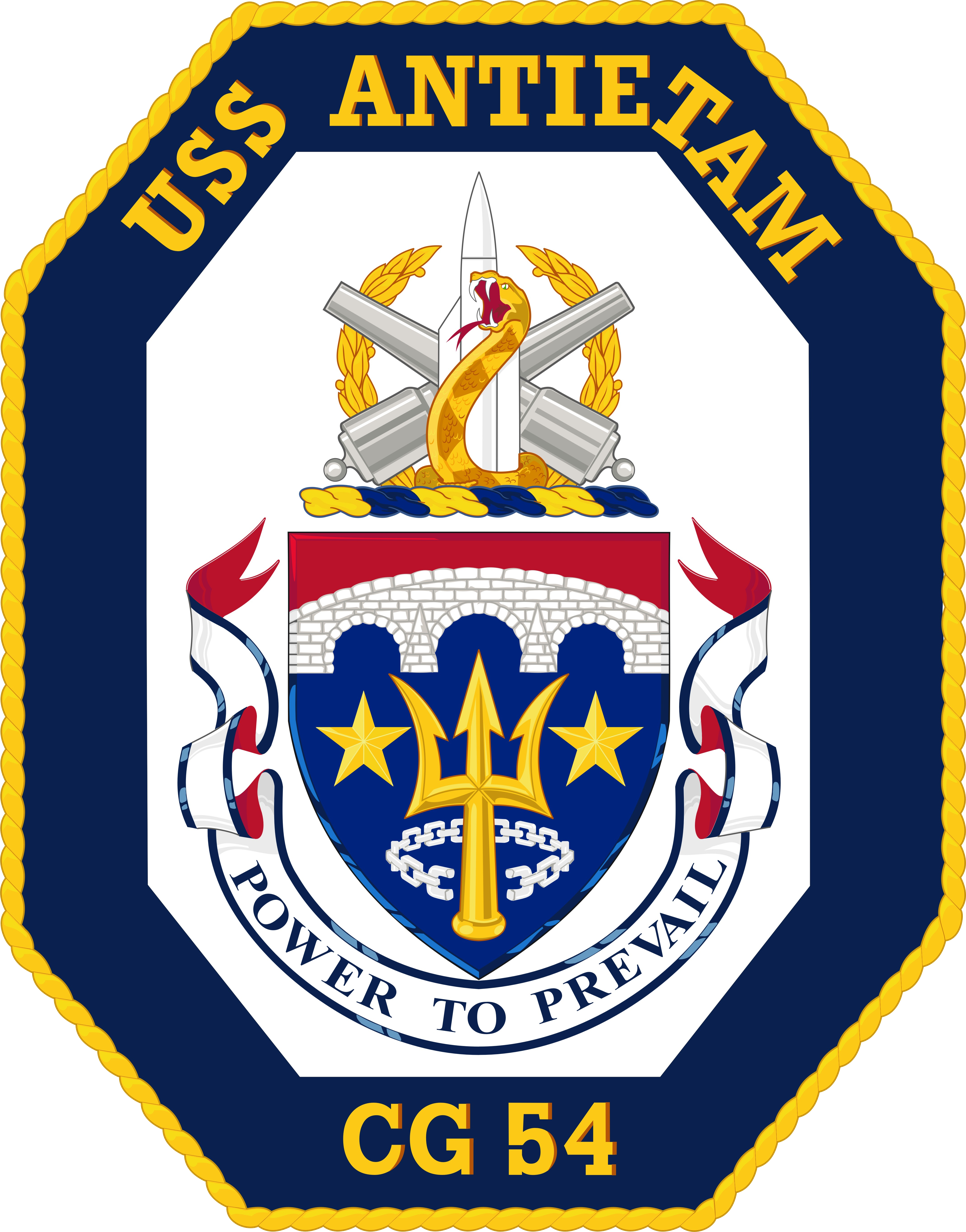
- Badge

General characteristics
- Class & type: Ticonderoga-class guided missile cruiser
- Displacement: Approx. 9,600 long tons (9,800 t) full load
- Length: 567 feet (173 m)
- Beam: 55 feet (16.8 meters)
- Draft: 34 feet (10.2 meters)
- Propulsion: 4 × General Electric LM2500 gas turbine engines; 2 × controllable-reversible pitch propellers; 2 × rudders
- Speed: 32.5 knots (60 km/h; 37.4 mph)
- Complement: 30 officers and 300 enlisted
- Sensors & processing systems: AN/SPY-1A/B multi-function radar; AN/SPS-49 air search radar (Removed on some ships); AN/SPG-62 fire control radar; AN/SPS-73 surface search radar; AN/SPQ-9 gun fire control radar; AN/SQQ-89(V)1/3 - A(V)15 Sonar suite, consisting of: AN/SQS-53B/C/D active sonar; AN/SQR-19 TACTAS, AN/SQR-19B ITASS, & MFTA passive sonar; AN/SQQ-28 light airborne multi-purpose system
- Electronic warfare & decoys: AN/SLQ-32 (3), SRBOC (Super Rapid Blooming Off-board Chaff)
- Armament: 2 × 61 cell Mk 41 vertical launch systems containing; 122 × mix of: RIM-66M-5 Standard SM-2MR Block IIIB; RIM-156A SM-2ER Block IV; RIM-161 SM-3; RIM-162A ESSM; RIM-174A Standard ERAM; BGM-109 Tomahawk; RUM-139A VL-ASROC; 8 × RGM-84 Harpoon missiles; 2 × 5 in (127 mm)/62 caliber Mark 45 Mod 4 lightweight gun; 2 × Mk 38 25 mm Machine Gun Systems; 2–4 × .50 in (12.7 mm) cal. machine gun; 2 × Phalanx CIWS Block 1B; 2 × Mk 32 12.75 in (324 mm) triple torpedo tubes
- Aircraft carried: 2 × MH-60R Seahawk LAMPS Mk III helicopters.

USS Antietam (CG-54) is a decommissioned Ticonderoga-class guided missile cruiser of the United States Navy. Antietam was named for the site of the 1862 Battle of Antietam, Maryland, between Confederate forces under General Robert E. Lee and Union forces under Major General George McClellan, during the American Civil War. Antietam earned the 2007 and 2008 Battle Efficiency awards, also known as the "Navy E" or "Battle E" award, for the John C. Stennis Strike Group.

== Construction ==
Antietam was laid down by the Litton-Ingalls Shipbuilding Corporation at Pascagoula, Mississippi, on 15 November 1984, launched on 14 February 1986, and commissioned on 6 June 1987 in Baltimore, Maryland.

== Public relations ==
From 1988 to 1991, the ship was assigned to Naval Surface Group, Long Beach, which was part of Commander, Naval Surface Forces Pacific, and available for tours.

The ship was featured in Visiting... with Huell Howser Episode 327, filmed in 1995.

== Capability ==
The ship is armed with guided missiles and rapid-fire guns. She also carries two Sikorsky SH-60 Seahawk LAMPS helicopters, capable of multiple missions, but primarily equipped for antisubmarine warfare (ASW).

== Ship history ==
Antietam was one of the first vessels to take part in Operation Desert Shield, along with the rest of the USS Independence Battlegroup in August 1990, in response to the Invasion of Kuwait. Antietam then returned to the United States on 20 December 1990. According to an interview in 2007 BBC documentary, The Last Flight to Kuwait, Lawrence Eddingfield, who was captain at that time stated that the vessel was involved in a helicopter rescue of two British SAS troops who had arrived on BA 149 during the invasion.

In March 2003, Antietam was assigned to Carrier Group Three.

Antietam operated out of her home port of San Diego, California. From February to August 2005, Antietam completed a circumnavigation of Earth, leaving San Diego to the west and returning home by way of the east. During the deployment, she had an extended stay in the Persian Gulf as part of Operation Iraqi Freedom. From January to August 2007, Antietam deployed to the Persian Gulf. During that seven-month deployment, she visited Dubai, Singapore, Hong Kong, and Pearl Harbor before returning to home port. In 2009, she completed a six-month deployment, leaving San Diego in January 2009, and returning home in July 2009. Stops along the way included Hong Kong, Japan, South Korea, Singapore, Thailand, Guam, and Hawaii.

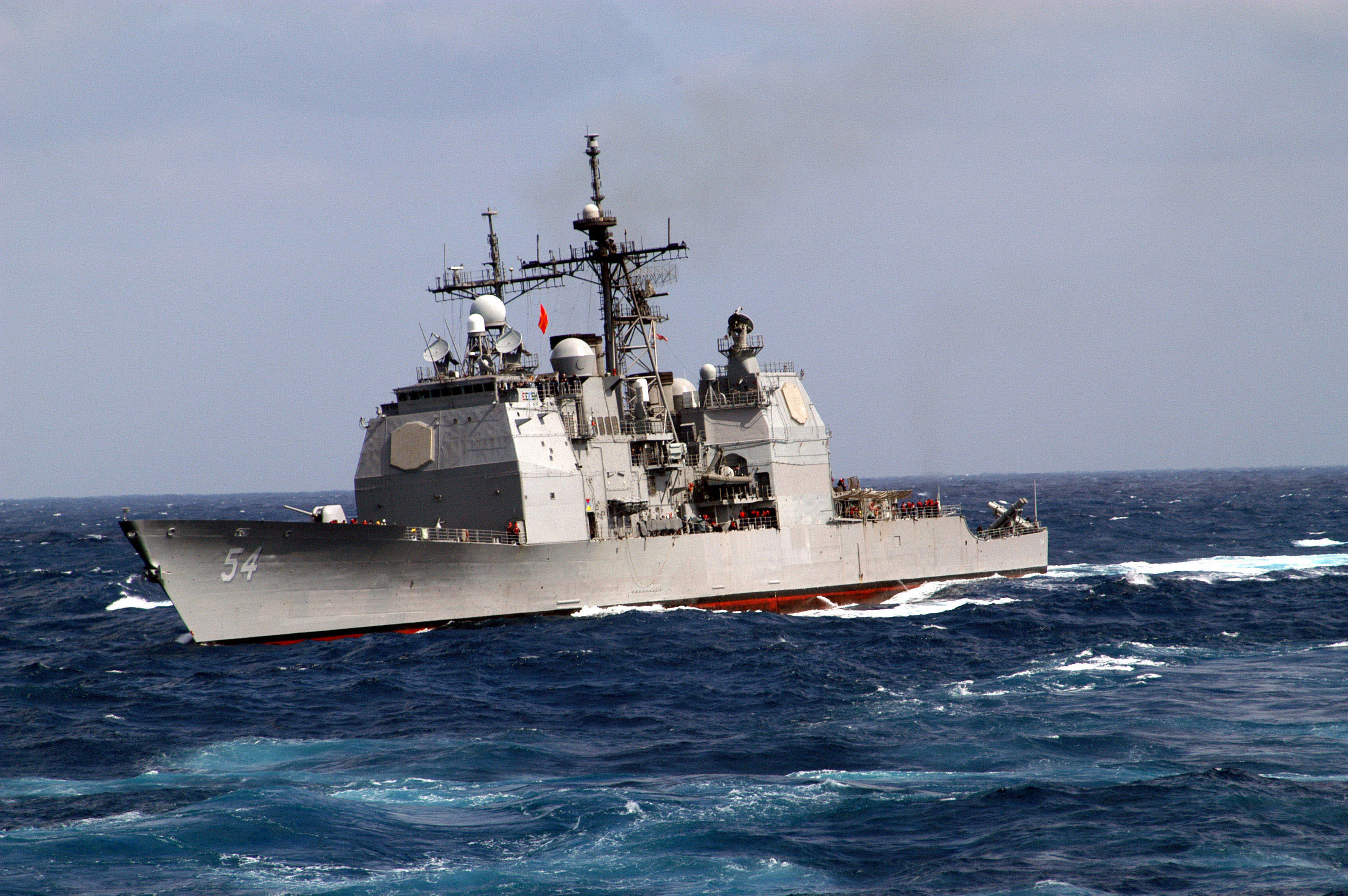
Antietam underway in the rough seas of the East China Sea in 2003

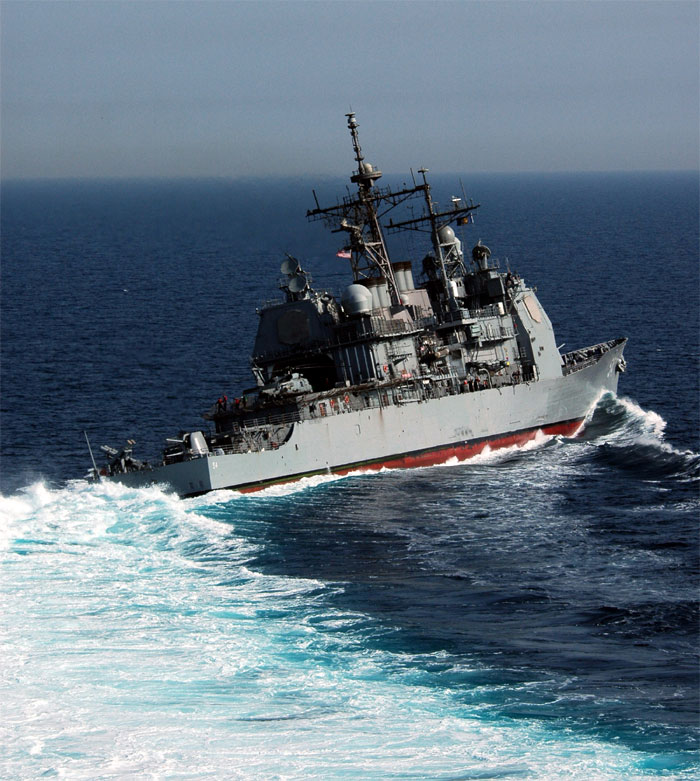
Antietam makes a hard turn right

In February 2013, Antietam relieved Cowpens in a "hull-swap" at Yokosuka, Japan, in which the two crews swapped ships. Cowpens, previously deployed to Yokosuka, was then homeported at Naval Base San Diego, California, while Antietam took up her new homeport at Yokosuka. On 31 January 2017, Antietam ran aground in Tokyo Bay near her home port of Yokosuka, Japan. Antietam was anchored off the coast in 30-knot (56 km/h; 35 mph) winds and a strong tide when the crew noticed the ship was dragging her anchor. They got the ship underway, but shortly after doing so, they felt the ship shudder as she lost all pitch control in both propellers. They had run aground on a shoal with damage to both propellers and one of the propeller hubs, causing 1,100 US gallons (4,200 L) of hydraulic oil to leak into the water. No personnel were injured during the incident. Repairs cost at least $4.2 million.

On 22 October 2018, she transited the Taiwan Strait along with the destroyer Curtis Wilbur. On 24–25 July 2019, she again transited the Taiwan Strait. On 19–20 September 2019 she transited the Taiwan Strait a third time. During at least one of these transits, a Chinese WZ-7 HALE drone as well as Shenyang J-11 strike fighters followed her and warned one of their helicopters that it was flying too close to the mainland.

In December 2020 the U.S. Navy's Report to Congress on the Annual Long-Range Plan for Construction of Naval Vessels stated that the ship was planned to be placed Out of Commission in Reserve in 2024.

In May 2022, Antietam was homeported at Yokosuka, Japan. She was part of Carrier Strike Group 5 led by the aircraft carrier USS Ronald Reagan. On 28 August 2022, Antietam along with sister ship Chancellorsville conducted a routine transit through the Taiwan Strait. This was the first such transit to occur since the 2022 visit by Nancy Pelosi to Taiwan.

On 25 June 2023, Antietam, along with aircraft carrier Ronald Reagan and cruiser Robert Smalls, paid a visit to Vietnam. They docked at Tien Sa port, Da Nang and stayed there until 30 June.

On 5 February 2024, the U.S. Navy announced that USS McCampbell (DDG 85) will forward deploy to Yokosuka, Japan. McCampbell will replace USS Antietam (CG 54), which will depart Yokosuka, Japan, in January, after 11 years of forward deployed service and move to Pearl Harbor, Hawaii, as part of a scheduled rotation of forces in the Pacific.

In March 2024, the Navy announced plans to inactivate Antietam on 27 September 2024. Following her decommissioning, Antietam was struck on 30 September, 2024.

=== Awards ===
- Navy Unit Commendation - (Aug–Nov 1990)
- Navy Meritorious Unit Commendation - (Dec 1998–May 1999, Feb–Sep 2003, Apr–Jun 2005, Apr 2012–Dec 2013)
- Battle "E" - (1989, 1990, 1994, 1995, 2000, 2003, 2007, 2008, 2012, 2014, 2015)
- Southwest Asia Service Medal - (Aug–Nov 1990)
- Spokane Trophy Award – (1990)
- Captain Edward F. Ney Memorial Award - (1993)
- LAMPS MK III Safety Award - (1989)
- CNO Afloat Safety Award (PACFLT) - (1997, 2006)
