= USS Preble (DDG-88) =

U.S. Navy Destroyer

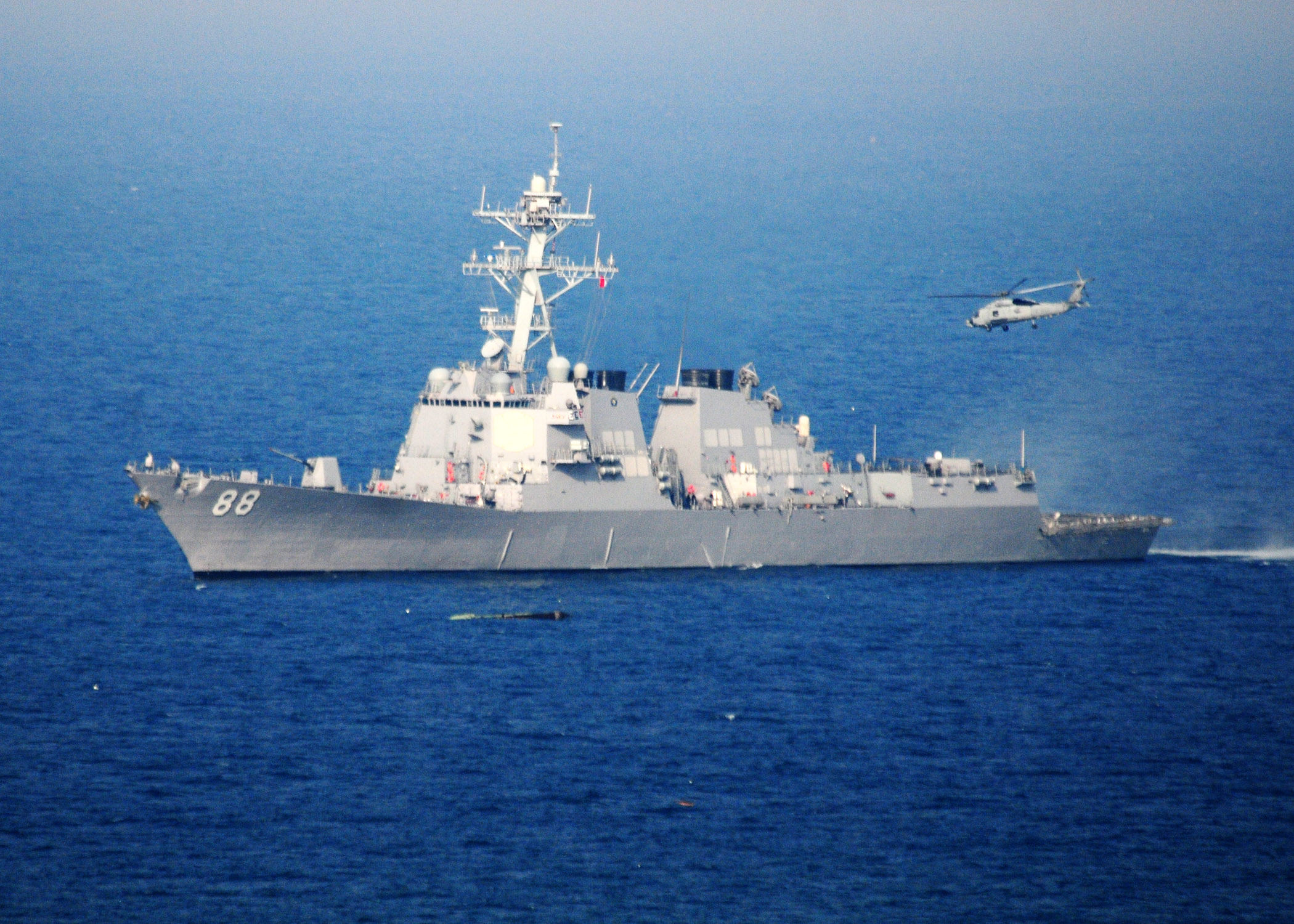
- USS Preble on 13 March 2011

History

United States
- Name: Preble
- Namesake: Edward Preble
- Ordered: 13 December 1996
- Builder: Ingalls Shipbuilding
- Laid down: 22 June 2000
- Launched: 1 June 2001
- Acquired: 12 August 2002
- Commissioned: 9 November 2002
- Home port: Yokosuka
- Identification: MMSI number: 389908000; Callsign: NPBL; Hull number: DDG-88
- Motto: Intrepid Patriot
- Honors and awards: See Awards
- Status: in active service
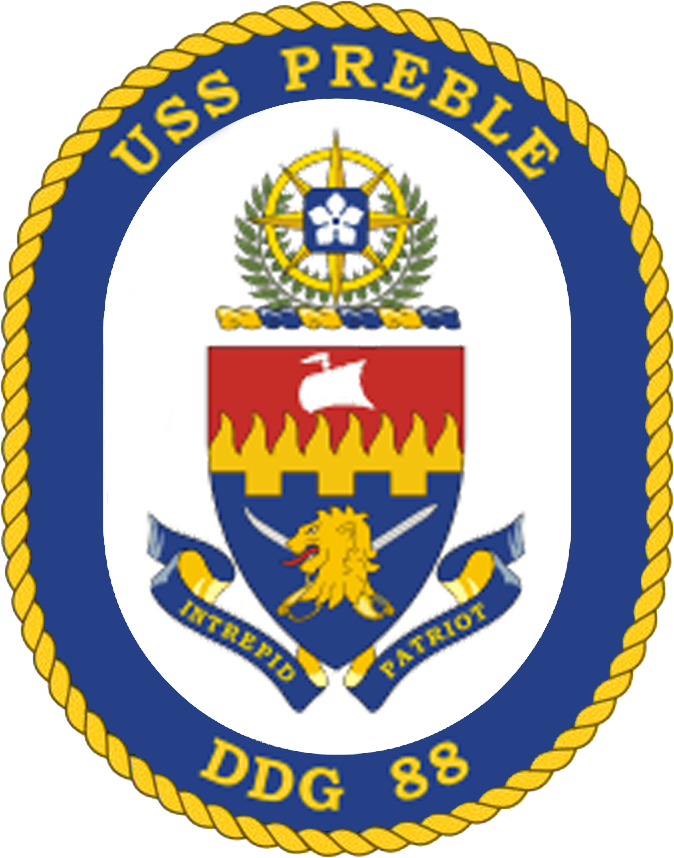
- Badge

General characteristics
- Class & type: Arleigh Burke-class destroyer
- Displacement: 9,200 tons
- Length: 509 ft 6 in (155 m)
- Beam: 59 ft (18 m)
- Draft: 31 ft (9.4 m)
- Propulsion: 2 × shafts
- Speed: In excess of 30 kn (56 km/h; 35 mph)
- Range: 4,400 nmi (8,100 km; 5,100 mi) at 20 kn (37 km/h; 23 mph)
- Complement: 33 commissioned officers; 38 chief petty officers; 210 enlisted personnel
- Sensors & processing systems: AN/SPY-1D PESA 3D radar (Flight I, II, IIA); AN/SPY-6(V)1 AESA 3D radar (Flight III); AN/SPS-67(V)3 or (V)5 surface search radar (DDG-51 – DDG-118); AN/SPQ-9B surface search radar (DDG-119 onward); AN/SPS-73(V)12 surface search/navigation radar (DDG-51 – DDG-86); BridgeMaster E surface search/navigation radar (DDG-87 onward); 3 × AN/SPG-62 fire-control radar; Mk 46 optical sight system (Flight I, II, IIA); Mk 20 electro-optical sight system (Flight III); AN/SQQ-89 ASW combat system: AN/SQS-53C sonar array; AN/SQR-19 tactical towed array sonar (Flight I, II, IIA); TB-37U multi-function towed array sonar (DDG-113 onward); AN/SQQ-28 LAMPS III shipboard system
- Electronic warfare & decoys: AN/SLQ-32 electronic warfare suite; AN/SLQ-25 Nixie torpedo countermeasures; Mk 36 Mod 12 decoy launching systems; Mk 53 Nulka decoy launching systems; Mk 59 decoy launching systems
- Armament: Guns: 1 × 5-inch (127 mm)/62 mk 45 mod 4 (lightweight gun); 2 × 25 mm (0.98 in) Mk 38 machine gun system; 4 × 0.50 inches (12.7 mm) caliber guns; Lasers: High Energy Laser with Integrated Optical-dazzler and Surveillance (HELIOS); Missiles: 1 × 32-cell, 1 × 64-cell (96 total cells) Mk 41 vertical launching system (VLS): RIM-66M surface-to-air missile; RIM-156 surface-to-air missile; RIM-174A standard ERAM; RIM-161 anti-ballistic missile; RIM-162 ESSM (quad-packed); BGM-109 Tomahawk cruise missile; RUM-139 vertical launch ASROC; Torpedoes: 2 × Mark 32 triple torpedo tubes: Mark 46 lightweight torpedo; Mark 50 lightweight torpedo; Mark 54 lightweight torpedo
- Aircraft carried: 2 × MH-60R Seahawk helicopters

USS Preble (DDG-88) is an Arleigh Burke-class (Flight IIA) Aegis guided missile destroyer in the United States Navy. She is the sixth U.S. Navy ship named in honor of Commodore Edward Preble, who served in the American Revolutionary War and was one of the early leaders of the Navy.

She was the 17th ship of this class to be built at Ingalls Shipbuilding in Pascagoula, Mississippi, and construction began on 22 June 2000. She was launched on 1 June 2001 and was christened on 9 June 2001. On 9 November 2002, she was commissioned during a ceremony at the Commonwealth Pier/World Trade Center in Boston, Massachusetts. At her commissioning ceremony USS Preble was docked bow to bow with USS Constitution, the command of her namesake. The ceremony included a symbolic welcoming aboard of the spirit of Commodore Preble signaled by the ringing of chimes. Among the speakers at the commissioning were U.S. Senator Edward Kennedy, U.S. Representative Stephen Lynch, then Chief of Naval Operations Admiral Vernon E. Clark USN (Ret.) and journalist and sailor Walter Cronkite.

== Service history ==
=== 2000s ===
Preble departed San Diego in June 2004 for her maiden deployment with the USS Belleau Wood Expeditionary Strike Group. Preble returned home after six months on 17 December 2004. On 20 January 2007, Preble departed for a routine deployment with the USS John C. Stennis carrier strike group. Preble supported Operation Enduring Freedom and Iraqi Freedom, Expeditionary Strike Force training and exercise Valiant Shield 2007 during the deployment. She returned to her homeport after seven months on 29 August 2007. In 2008, Preble successfully completed an accelerated training cycle and passed a rigorous Inspection Board and Survey (INSURV) in May. That fall, Preble executed the integrated training phase with the Stennis Strike Group in preparation for a deployment in 2009.

=== 2010s ===
Preble deployed on 17 January 2009 for a routine deployment with the Stennis Carrier Strike Group where she spent five months in the Seventh Fleet area of responsibility, participated in Exercise Foal Eagle and culminated the deployment with a diplomatic port visit in Tahiti, French Polynesia. Preble returned to home port on 15 June 2009. In 2010 Preble shifted to align with the USS Ronald Reagan Strike Group and hosted sailors from the Royal New Zealand Navy. The Anzac-class frigate HMNZS Te Kaha and replenishment tanker HMNZS Endeavour conducted exercises with Preble during a 3-day underway period. Additionally, Preble was called to act as the lead ship for a Destroyer Squadron Seven multi-group sail that showcased the ship's anti-submarine warfare capabilities.

In September 2010, Preble conducted an Operational Test Launch of two Block 3C Tomahawk missiles and one Block 4E Tomahawk missile off the coast of San Nicholas Island. The launch was successful and aided in the further development of the weapon system. Preble participated in an Integrated Anti-Submarine Warfare Course at sea as well as three weeks of exercises with Ronald Reagan and sister ships in Destroyer Squadron Seven during the Composite Unit Training Exercise (COMPTUEX) in October to November 2010. In November 2010, Preble successfully conducted a Mark 54 torpedo technical evaluation in support of the Naval Undersea Warfare Center's development of the torpedo. Preble accurately fired six MK 54 torpedoes during the evaluation.

In all, Preble had a successful 2010 and was awarded the Destroyer Squadron Seven Battle Efficiency Award which recognizes sustained superior performance, operational effectiveness, and continuous readiness. In addition, the ship earned the Black E (Maritime Warfare Excellence), Blue E (Logistics Management and Supply Excellence), Yellow E (Ship Safety) and Red E (Engineering/Survivability Excellence).

In February 2011, Preble deployed with Carrier Strike Group Seven. Preble was a first responder to the 2011 Tōhoku earthquake and tsunami. The ship conducted humanitarian and disaster relief efforts off the coast of northeastern Japan.

After spending nearly a month off the coast of Japan, Preble began to conduct a series of fisheries patrols. From 28 February to 6 March 2011, she conducted these patrols in the Exclusive Economic Zones of various Pacific island nations as part of the Oceania Maritime Security Initiative. With modern technology, fishing vessels have increased their capability and capacity to catch more fish, and consequently, it is imperative that the rights of small island nations to their EEZ be preserved to prevent illegal fishing and exploitation of their ecosystems. EEZ patrols are part of an ongoing partnership between the U.S. Navy and U.S. Coast Guard to reduce and eliminate illegal, unregulated, unreported (IUU) fishing and effectively enforce fishing regulations across the Western Pacific.

Preble's mission supported the United States' long-standing partnership with the maritime nations of Micronesia, Oceania, and the Marshall Islands, with the focus on IUU fishing in the EEZs of these island nations and on the high seas itself. During the course of this operation, Preble encountered multiple vessels conducting fishing operations in EEZ. All the data was reported to USCG District 14 for evaluation and follow-on action via the embarked Coast Guard liaison team. Also, Preble's embarked detachment of Sikorsky SH-60 Seahawk helicopters from squadron HSL-43 was used to conduct routine aerial patrols, enabling the surveillance team to search multiple areas of interest.

She then continued west to operate as part of the Seventh and Fifth Fleets. Preble came under the command of the Fifth Fleet in May 2011 and conducted counter-piracy operations as part of Combined Task Force 151. Preble returned home in late 2011.

On 25 August 2011, BAE Systems Ship Repair was awarded a $14.5 million contract, in addition to a previous contract, to upgrade and repair Preble.

In 2019 it was announced that Preble would receive the HELIOS close in weapons system in 2021. USS Preble is the first destroyer to be equipped with a high-energy laser to counter surface craft and unmanned aerial systems. The destroyer will also receive a BAE Systems Ship Repair upgrade, bringing the ship up to date in terms of capability and complexity.

=== 2020s ===
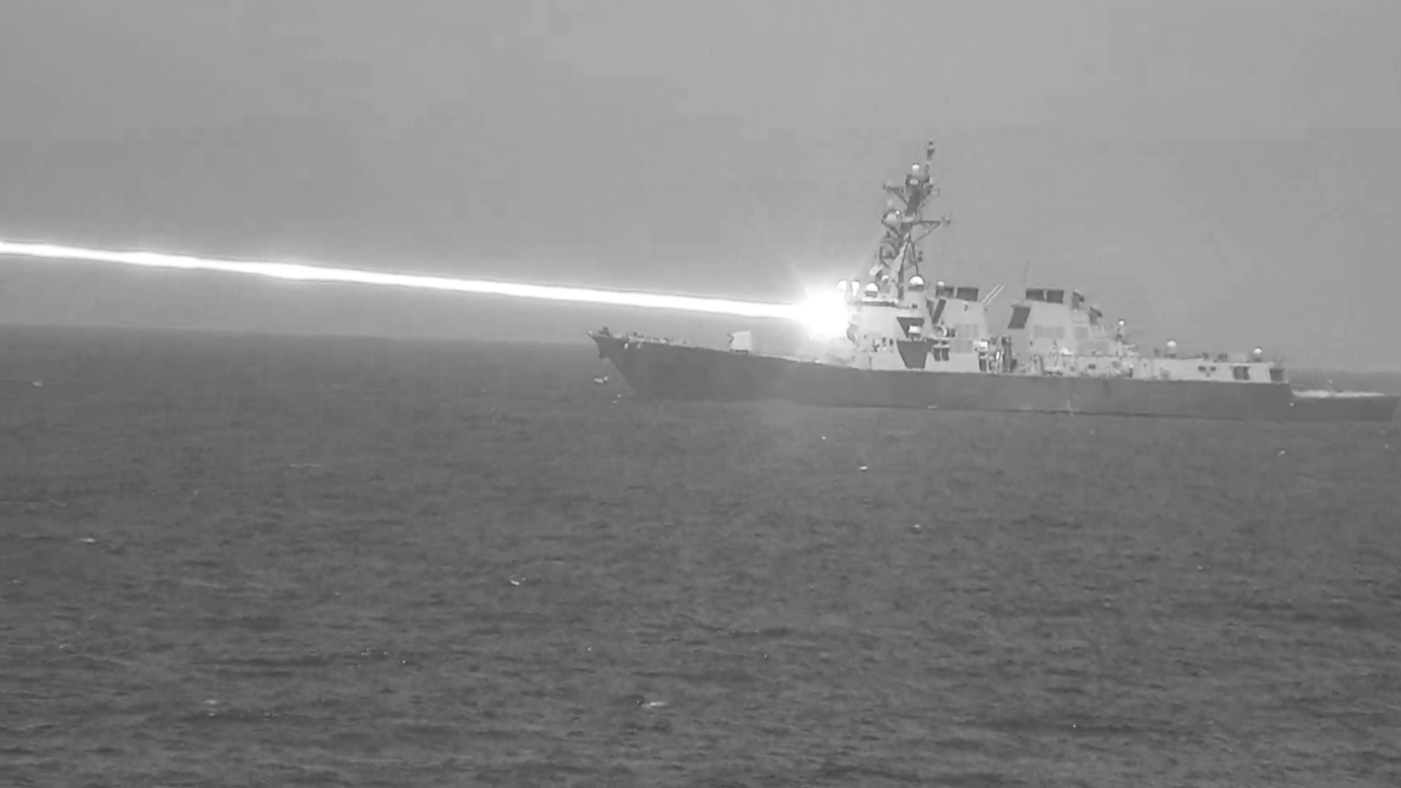
Preble firing the High Energy Laser with Integrated Optical-dazzler and Surveillance (HELIOS) system in 2024

In 2024 USS Preble assisted the Missile Defense Agency in conducting FTM32. This mission was conducted off the coast of Kauai, Hawaii. Preble launched a Standard Missile-6 (SM-6) Dual II with Software Upgrade (SWUP) in order to intercept a Medium Range Ballistic Missile (MRBM). This mission was a collaboration by the Missile Defense Agency, United States Navy, Royal Australian Navy, and Lockheed Martin. The MDA Director Lieutenant General Heath Collins said this in regards to the mission “This successful intercept against an advanced threat-representative target in the final stages of flight demonstrated the power and flexibility of the Aegis Weapon System paired with the Standard Missile 6”. In 2024, USS Preble also demonstrated the HELIOS directed energy weapon system against a target drone.

== Awards ==
- Battle "E" - (2005, 2010, 2013)
- Humanitarian Service Medal - (Mar-May 2011)
- Spokane Trophy Award - (2013)
- Middle Pacific (MIDPAC) Energy Conservation Award - (2015)

== Coat of arms ==
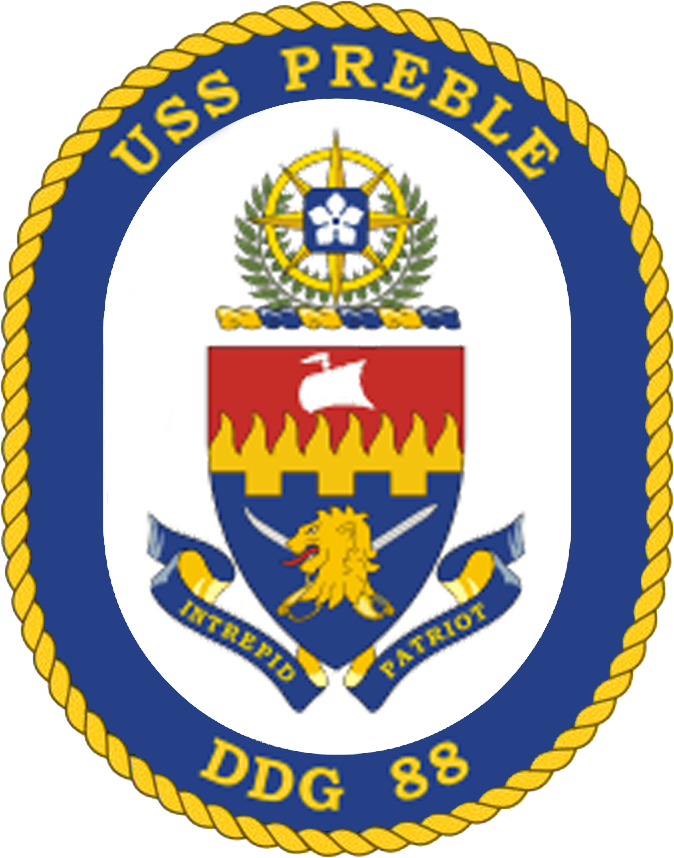

=== Shield ===
The shield consists of embattlement and scarlet rayonny splitting the shield. Above is a ships sail while below is a lion’s head with a crossed sword and cutlass.

The traditional Navy colors were chosen for the shield because dark blue and gold represents the sea and excellence respectively. The attack and bombardment at Tripoli's Harbor in 1803 against Barbary pirates, led by Commodore Preble, is shown by the embattlement and scarlet rayonny and represents the fire and destruction brought to the port. Scarlet is symbolic for courage, the fiery resolve and Preble's determination to end attacks in the region on American trading vessels. The ships sail is another reference to the successful Tripoli attack and blockade as well as Preble's other commands, particularly USS Constitution and the frigate Essex. The lions head comes from the Preble family coat of arms which signifies courage and strength. The crossed cutlass and sword characterize the combat readiness to defend the countries interests.

=== Crest ===
The crest consists of a compass rose with a cinquefoil escutcheon center, surrounded by a laurel wreath.

The laurel wreath signifies honor and the compass rose points recall the eight battle stars earned by USS Preble (DD-345) for her World War II service. The compass rose denotes the modern capabilities and worldwide service of Preble and its predecessors. The blue escutcheon, is shaped as an AEGIS radar panel, represents the advanced technologies and modern warfare systems of the new Preble. A cinquefoil is centered in the escutcheon to remember the five previous ships to hold the Preble name.

=== Motto ===
The motto is written on a scroll of blue that has a gold reverse side.

The ships motto is "Intrepid Patriot". The motto is a reference to honor the United States Navy.

=== Seal ===
The coat of arms in full color as in the blazon, upon a white background enclosed within a dark blue oval border edged on the outside with a gold rope and bearing the inscription "USS Preble" at the top and "DDG 88" in the base all gold.

== In popular culture ==
- USS Preble (DDG-88) appears in the 2009 film Transformers: Revenge of the Fallen under the name USS Kidd.
- USS Preble (DDG-88) is featured in the 2011 video game Battlefield 3 and the 2013 video game Battlefield 4.
