= USS Milius =

US Navy Arleigh Burke-class destroyer

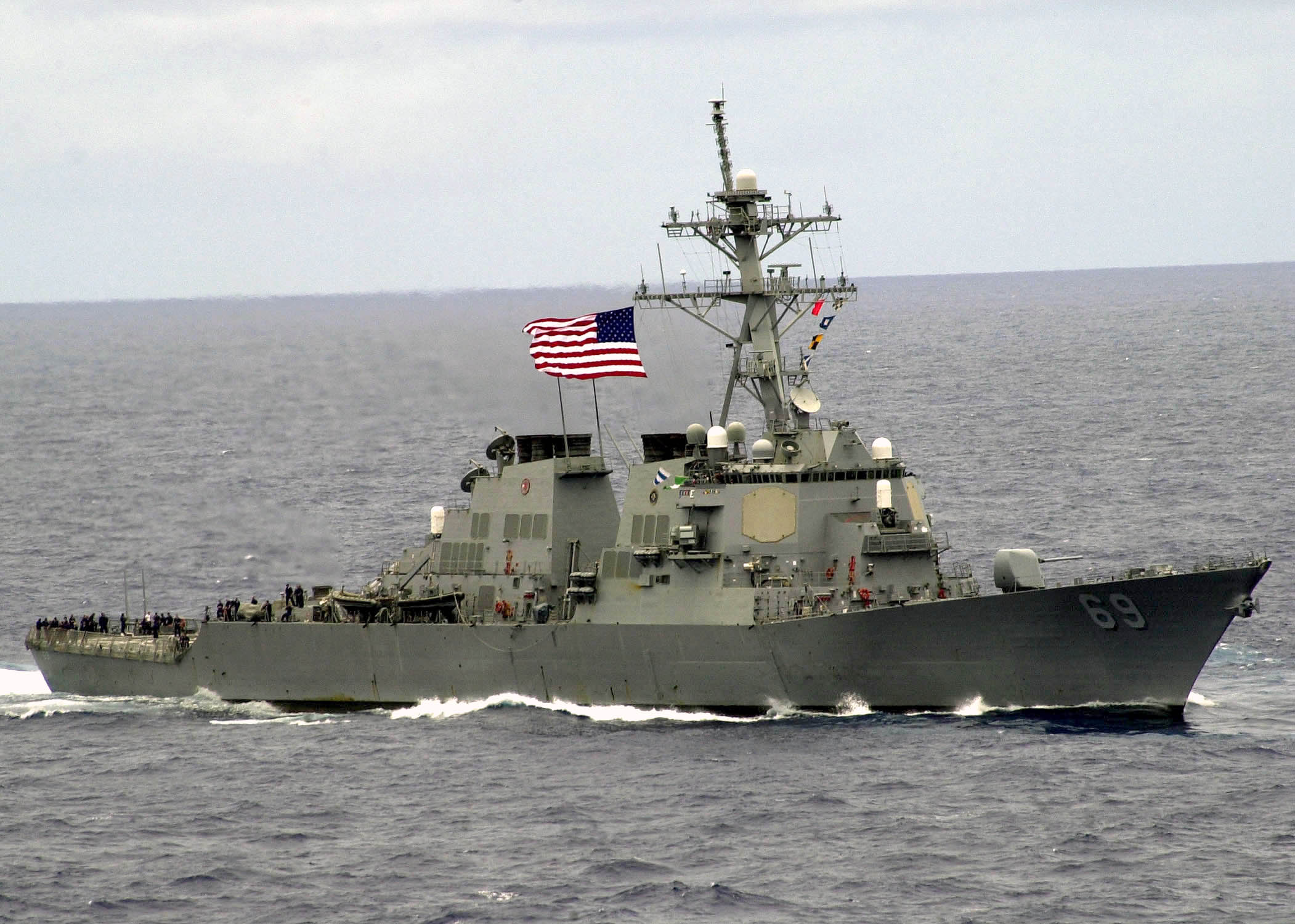
- USS Milius on 20 May 2003

History

United States
- Name: Milius
- Namesake: Paul L. Milius
- Ordered: 8 April 1992
- Builder: Ingalls Shipbuilding
- Laid down: 8 August 1994
- Launched: 1 August 1995
- Sponsored by: Annette Milius
- Christened: 28 October 1995
- Commissioned: 23 November 1996
- Home port: Yokosuka
- Identification: MMSI number: 367199000; Callsign: NPLM; Hull number: DDG-69
- Motto: Alii Prae Me; (Others Before Me)
- Honours and awards: See Awards
- Status: in active service
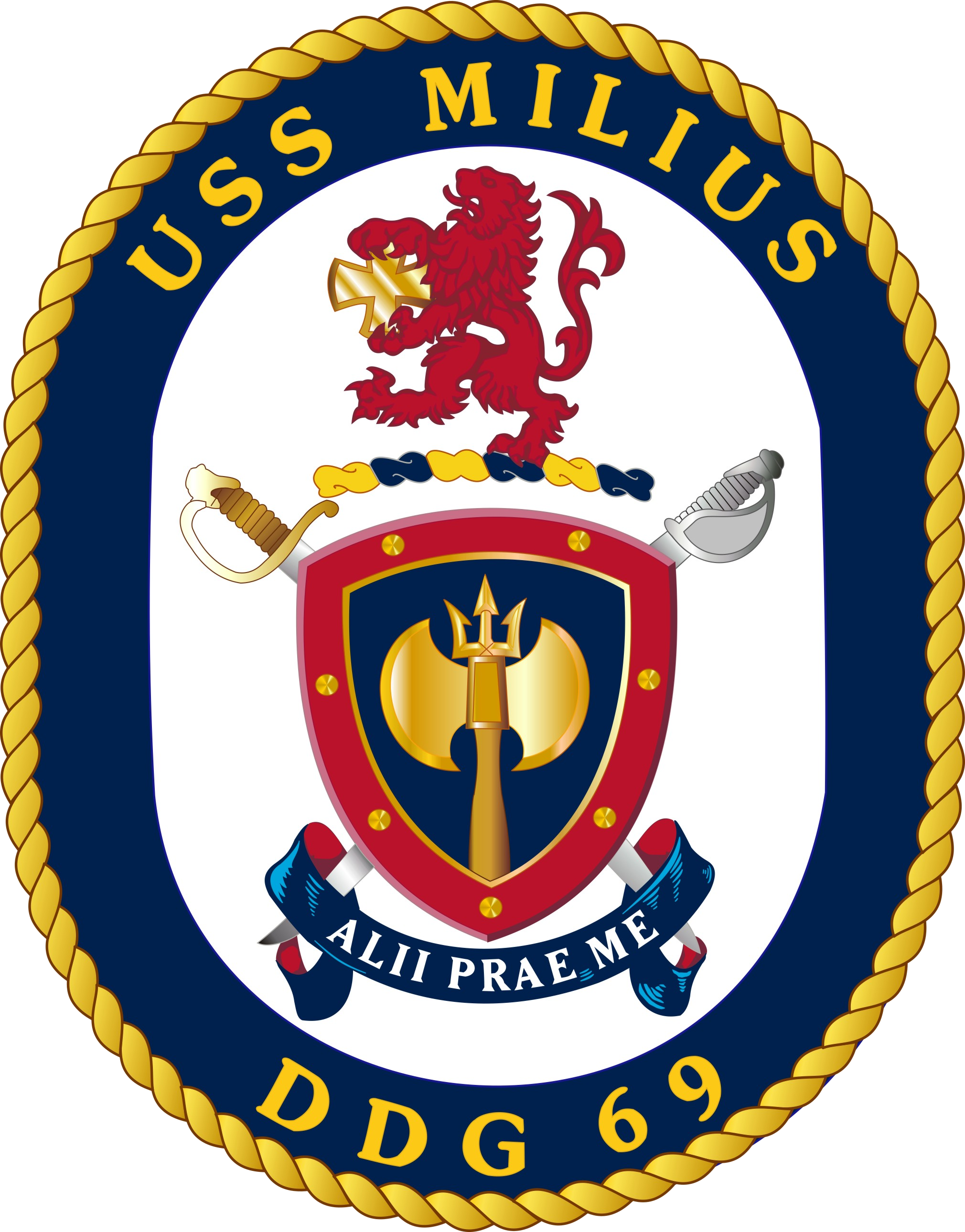
- Badge

General characteristics
- Class & type: Arleigh Burke-class destroyer
- Displacement: Light: approx. 6,800 long tons (6,900 t); Full: approx. 8,900 long tons (9,000 t)
- Length: 505 ft (154 m)
- Beam: 59 ft (18 m)
- Draft: 31 ft (9.4 m)
- Propulsion: 2 × shafts
- Speed: In excess of 30 kn (56 km/h; 35 mph)
- Range: 4,400 nmi (8,100 km; 5,100 mi) at 20 kn (37 km/h; 23 mph)
- Complement: 33 commissioned officers; 38 chief petty officers; 210 enlisted personnel
- Sensors & processing systems: AN/SPY-1D PESA 3D radar (Flight I, II, IIA); AN/SPY-6(V)1 AESA 3D radar (Flight III); AN/SPS-67(V)3 or (V)5 surface search radar (DDG-51 – DDG-118); AN/SPQ-9B surface search radar (DDG-119 onward); AN/SPS-73(V)12 surface search/navigation radar (DDG-51 – DDG-86); BridgeMaster E surface search/navigation radar (DDG-87 onward); 3 × AN/SPG-62 fire-control radar; Mk 46 optical sight system (Flight I, II, IIA); Mk 20 electro-optical sight system (Flight III); AN/SQQ-89 ASW combat system: AN/SQS-53C sonar array; AN/SQR-19 tactical towed array sonar (Flight I, II, IIA); TB-37U multi-function towed array sonar (DDG-113 onward); AN/SQQ-28 LAMPS III shipboard system
- Electronic warfare & decoys: AN/SLQ-32 electronic warfare suite; AN/SLQ-25 Nixie torpedo countermeasures; Mk 36 Mod 12 decoy launching systems; Mk 53 Nulka decoy launching systems; Mk 59 decoy launching systems
- Armament: Guns: 1 × 5-inch (127 mm)/54 mk 45 mod 1/2 (lightweight gun); 2 × 20 mm (0.8 in) Phalanx CIWS; 2 × 25 mm (0.98 in) Mk 38 machine gun system; 4 × 0.50 inches (12.7 mm) caliber guns; Missiles: 2 × Mk 141 Harpoon anti-ship missile launcher; 1 × 29-cell, 1 × 61-cell (90 total cells) Mk 41 vertical launching system (VLS): RIM-66M surface-to-air missile; RIM-156 surface-to-air missile; RIM-161 anti-ballistic missile; BGM-109 Tomahawk cruise missile; RUM-139 vertical launch ASROC; Torpedoes: 2 × Mark 32 triple torpedo tubes: Mark 46 lightweight torpedo; Mark 50 lightweight torpedo; Mark 54 lightweight torpedo
- Aircraft carried: 1 × Sikorsky MH-60R

USS Milius (DDG-69) is an Arleigh Burke-class (Flight I) Aegis guided missile destroyer of the United States Navy. It is the first US Navy ship named after a POW/MIA from the Vietnam War. She is named after Captain Paul L. Milius, a naval aviator presumed killed following the crash of his aircraft over Laos in February 1968. Captain Milius's daughter, Annette, became the sponsor and later christened the ship named in honor of her father.

== Service history ==
In January 2005, Milius participated in Operation Unified Assistance. On 6 December 2006, the ship successfully launched a Block IV Tomahawk cruise missile for the first time in a test of the Block IV configuration. The launch took place in the Naval Air Warfare Center Weapons Division Sea Test Range off of California. The missile flew 869 miles before impacting its target on the land range at China Lake, California.

On 12 September 2007, the Embassy of the United States, Manila stated that the arrival of the destroyers USS Chung-Hoon and USS Milius was a goodwill visit to strengthen Philippines–United States relations.

On 23 November 2021, Milius conducted a transit of the Taiwan Strait.

On 9 August 2023, the Navy announced plans to extend the ship's service life beyond the initial 35 years, intending to keep Milius in service until at least 2035.

=== Deployments ===
- 26 May 1998 – September 1998: Maiden deployment
- 22 June 2000 – December 2000: West Pac–Indian Ocean–Persian Gulf
- 2 November 2002 – 2 June 2003: West Pac–Indian Ocean–Persian Gulf
- 6 December 2004 – 6 June 2005: West Pac–Indian Ocean–Persian Gulf
- 10 April 2007 – 8 October 2007: Scheduled Deployment with BHR ESG
- December 2008 – July 2009: West Pac–Indian Ocean–Persian Gulf
- 18 May 2010 – 16 December 2010: West Pac–Indian Ocean–Persian Gulf
- 11 January 2012 – 11 September 2012: West Pac–Indian Ocean–Persian Gulf
- 20 October 2014 – 25 June 2015: West Pac–Indian Ocean–Persian Gulf
- May 2018 – TBD: Forward deployed to 7th Fleet, USS Milius changes homeport from San Diego, CA to Yokosuka, Japan.

== Coat of arms ==
The ship's crest honors Captain Paul Lloyd Milius, commemorating his military service, courage, and selfless heroism.

Dark blue and gold are colors traditionally used by the Navy and denote the sea and excellence. The shield itself reflects the power of the Aegis shield. The double-edged battle-ax signifies the ship's formidable power—both a warning to maintain peace and a weapon capable of devastating force when provoked. The battle-ax harness is a warning that peace should be maintained; provoked and unleashed, the battle-ax is a punishing offensive weapon capable of delivering crushing blows. The trident highlights the ship's ability to project power across land, air, and sea, including underwater. The crossed swords are the modern Navy sword of today and the cutlass of the John Paul Jones era symbolizing the enduring tradition and heritage of the United States Navy. The red border stands for unity, readiness, and sacrifice. The seven bolts on the border represent the seven lives saved by Captain Milius' heroic action.

The lion suggests Captain Milius' extraordinary heroism as the aircraft commander in Observation Squadron Sixty-Seven for which he received the Navy Cross, represented by the cross plate, and underscored his courage and devotion to duty.

Alii Prae Me – "Others Before Myself" – a reflection of his unwavering personal ethic.

== Awards ==
USS Milius has been awarded the Navy Battle "E" four times

- 01-Jan-2002 to 31-Dec-2002
- 01-Jan-2012 to 31-Dec-2012
- 01-Jan-2015 to 31-Dec-2015
- 01-Jan-2019 to 31-Dec-2019
- CNO Afloat Safety Award (PACFLT) - (2005)
- PACFLT 2003 Retention Excellence Award Winner
- PACFLT 2002 Marjorie Sterrett Battleship Fund Award
- PACFLT Anti-Submarine Warfare (ASW) Bloodhound Award - 2019
- Spokane Trophy - (2019, 2022)

== Ship awards ==
Ribbon	Description	Notes
	Navy "E" Ribbon	with three Battle E devices
	National Defense Service Medal	
Ribbon of the GWTEM	Global War on Terrorism Expeditionary Medal	
Ribbon of the GWTSM	Global War on Terrorism Service Medal	
	Navy Sea Service Deployment Ribbon	with one silver service star

== In popular culture ==
Milius stood in as a US Navy ship in the 2025 Marvel movie Captain America: Brave New World.
