= USS Robert Smalls =

Ticonderoga-class cruiser

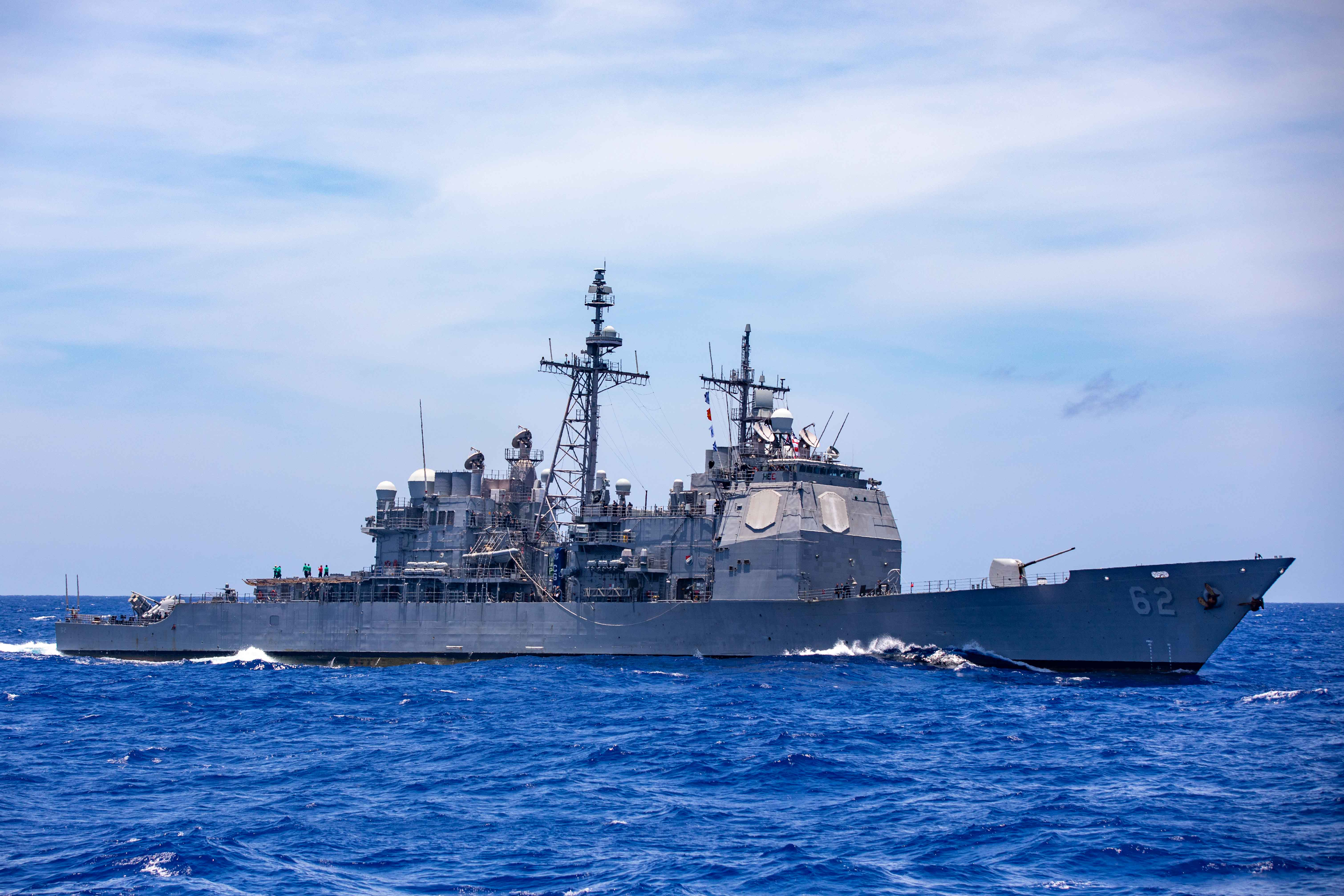
- USS Robert Smalls (CG-62)

History

United States
- Name: Robert Smalls
- Namesake: Battle of Chancellorsville (formerly); Robert Smalls
- Ordered: 26 November 1984
- Builder: Ingalls Shipbuilding
- Laid down: 24 June 1987
- Launched: 15 July 1988
- Sponsored by: Sharron M. Martin, the wife of Vice Adm. Edward H. Martin
- Christened: 23 July 1988
- Commissioned: 4 November 1989
- Maiden voyage: March 1991
- Renamed: from Chancellorsville
- Home port: San Diego
- Identification: MMSI number: 368776000; Call sign: NCVL; Hull number: CG-62
- Status: in active service
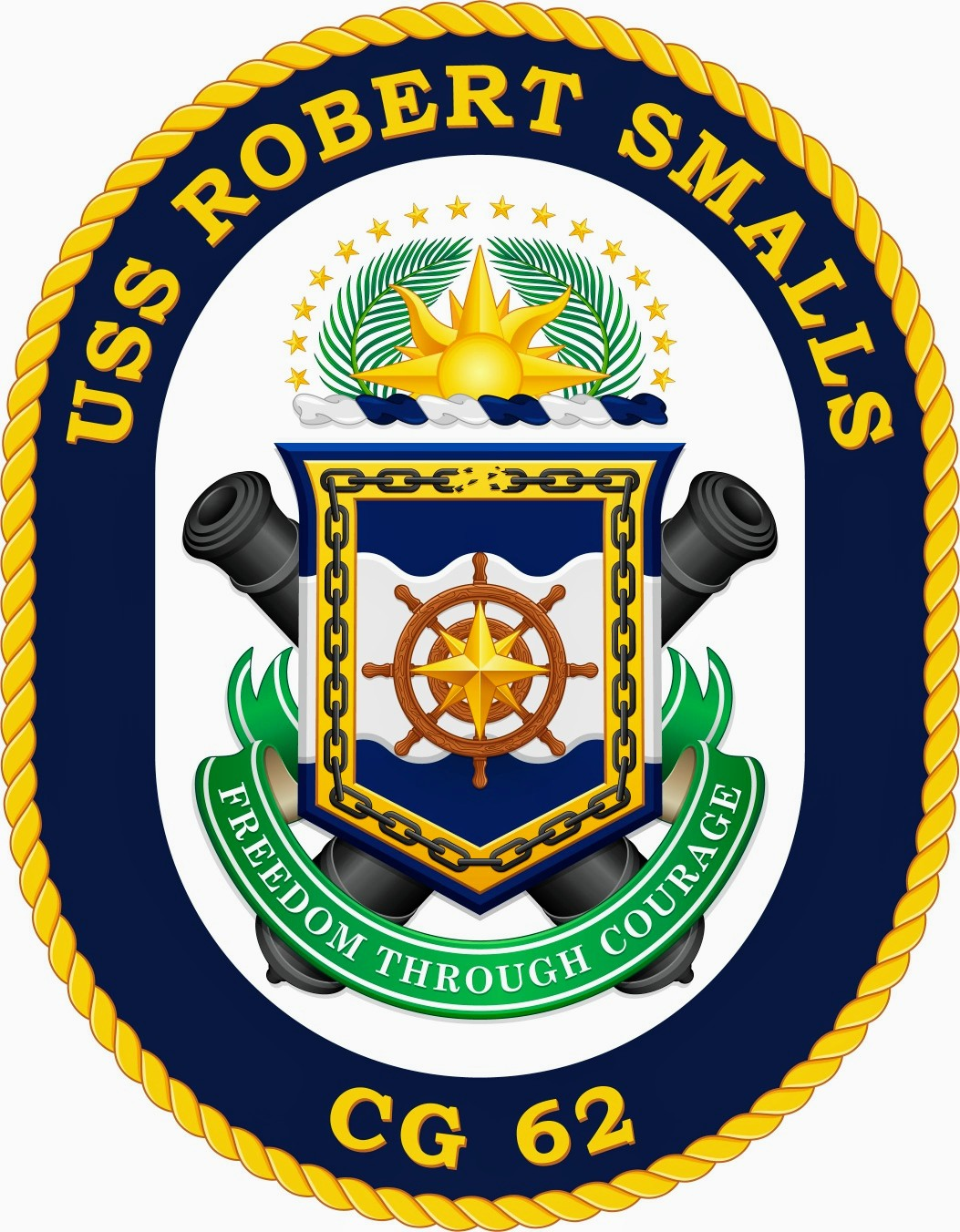
- Badge

General characteristics
- Class & type: Ticonderoga-class cruiser
- Displacement: Approx. 9,600 long tons (9,800 t) full load
- Length: 567 feet (173 m)
- Beam: 55 feet (16.8 meters)
- Draught: 34 feet (10.2 meters)
- Propulsion: 4 × General Electric LM2500 gas turbine engines; 2 × controllable-reversible pitch propellers; 2 × rudders
- Speed: 32.5 knots (60 km/h; 37.4 mph)
- Complement: 30 officers and 300 enlisted
- Sensors & processing systems: AN/SPY-1A/B multi-function radar; AN/SPS-49 air search radar (Removed on some ships); AN/SPG-62 fire control radar; AN/SPS-73 surface search radar; AN/SPQ-9 gun fire control radar; AN/SQQ-89(V)1/3 - A(V)15 Sonar suite, consisting of: AN/SQS-53B/C/D active sonar; AN/SQR-19 TACTAS, AN/SQR-19B ITASS, & MFTA passive sonar; AN/SQQ-28 light airborne multi-purpose system
- Armament: 2 × 61 cell Mk 41 vertical launch systems containing; 122 × mix of: RIM-66M-5 Standard SM-2MR Block IIIB; RIM-156A SM-2ER Block IV; RIM-161 SM-3; RIM-162A ESSM; RIM-174A Standard ERAM; BGM-109 Tomahawk; RUM-139A VL-ASROC; 8 × RGM-84 Harpoon missiles; 2 × 5 in (127 mm)/62 caliber Mark 45 Mod 4 lightweight gun; 2 × Mk 38 25 mm Machine Gun Systems; 2–4 × .50 in (12.7 mm) cal. machine gun; 2 × Phalanx CIWS Block 1B; 2 × Mk 32 12.75 in (324 mm) triple torpedo tubes
- Aircraft carried: 2 × MH-60R Seahawk LAMPS Mk III helicopters.

USS Robert Smalls (CG-62) is a Ticonderoga-class guided-missile cruiser built during the Cold War for the United States Navy. Commissioned in 1989, the warship was originally named USS Chancellorsville for the American Civil War Battle of Chancellorsville. In March 2023, she was renamed for Robert Smalls, a former slave who freed himself and others by commandeering a Confederate transport ship.

Until 30 December 2011, the ship was operationally part of Carrier Strike Group Seven. In 2010 she was administratively under the command of Commander, Naval Surface Forces Pacific. She was assigned to Carrier Strike Group Five and is deployed to Yokosuka, Japan.

Robert Smalls is equipped with guided missiles and rapid-fire cannons, with anti-air, anti-surface and anti-subsurface capabilities. She also carries two MH-60R Seahawk Light Airborne Multi-Purpose System (LAMPS) helicopters, focused on anti-submarine warfare.

== History ==
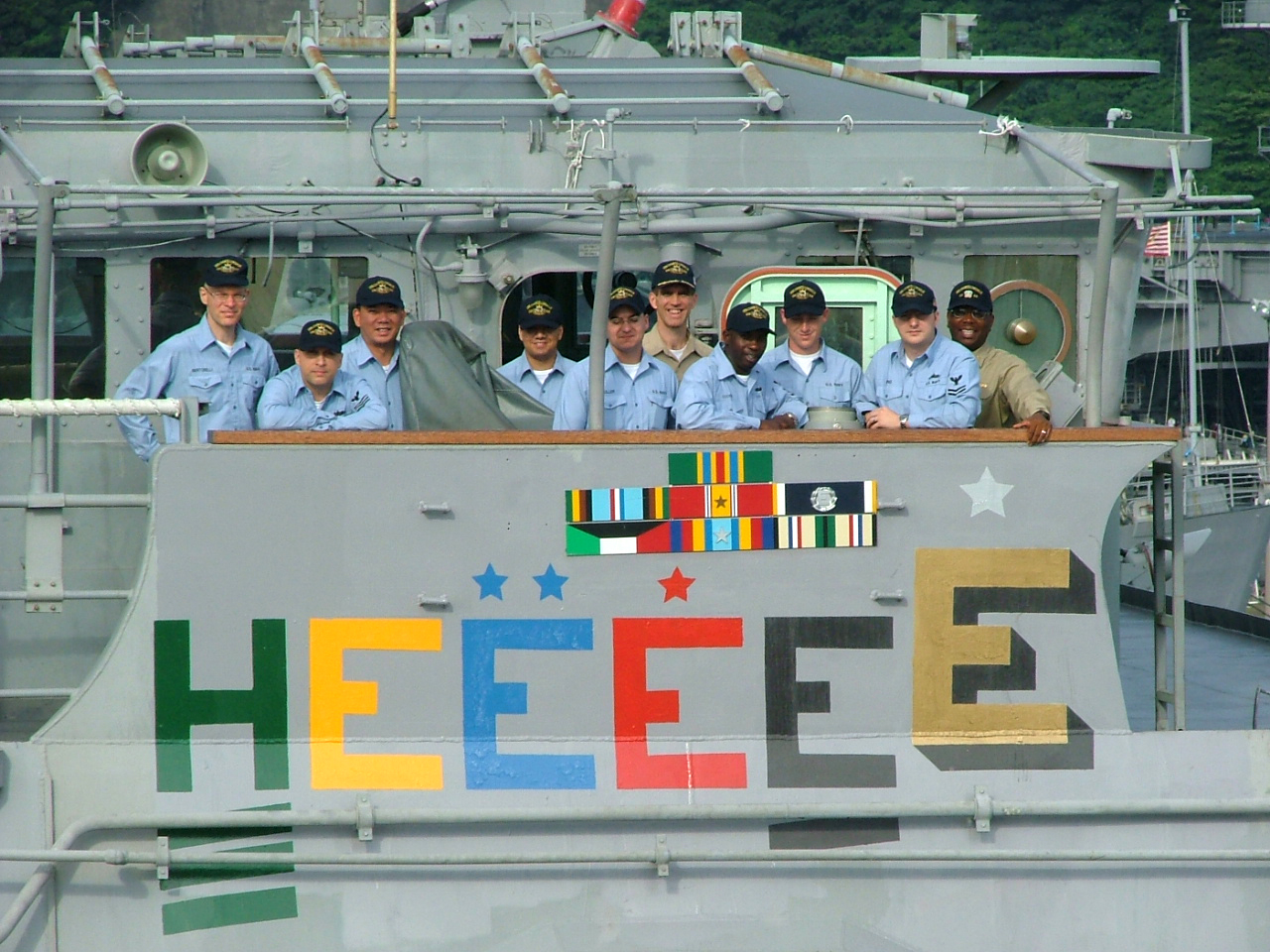
Chancellorsville sailors pose in 2004 above the gold "Battle E" that shows the ship earned the Navy's prestigious Battle Effectiveness Award for five consecutive years.

The ship was commissioned at Ingalls Shipbuilding in Pascagoula, Mississippi, as Chancellorsville on 4 November 1989.

=== 1990s ===
She first deployed in March 1991, to the Persian Gulf in support of Operation Desert Storm.

Chancellorsville was next deployed from February to August 1993, to the Persian Gulf as part of the Nimitz Battle Group. On 26 June 1993, Chancellorsville launched strikes on the Iraqi Intelligence Center in Baghdad with nine Tomahawk missiles in retaliation for the aborted assassination attempt on former President Bush. She deployed again to the Western Pacific and Persian Gulf from April to October 1995.

Following a Fifth Fleet deployment to the North Persian Gulf in 1995, Chancellorsville was awarded the Spokane Trophy in 1996. The Spokane Trophy is awarded by Commander-in-Chief, United States Pacific Fleet to the surface combatant ship considered to be the most proficient in overall combat systems readiness and warfare operations.

Chancellorsville deployed to the Caribbean and Eastern Pacific in support of joint counter-narcotics operations in November 1997. During this deployment, she rescued the crew of an Ecuadorian fishing vessel which had been adrift for ten days. Upon her return home, Chancellorsville underwent her first major nine-month overhaul in San Diego, California.

On 7 July 1998, Chancellorsville changed homeport from San Diego, to Yokosuka, Japan, joining Task Force 70/Battle Force Seventh Fleet, and probably, Carrier Group Five. After arriving in Yokosuka, Chancellorsville participated in multinational operations in the Sea of Japan, including the International Fleet Review. Chancellorsville took part in exercises with the Kitty Hawk Battle Group in the spring of 1999.

On 6 April 1999, Chancellorsville deployed to the Persian Gulf in company with Kitty Hawk and Curtis Wilbur in support of Operation Southern Watch, and returned to Yokosuka on 5 January 2000. In May 2000, Chancellorsville participated in exercises with the Thai and Singaporean navies.

=== 2000s ===
Following a visit to Qingdao, China, in August 2000, Chancellorsville took part in ANNUALEX 12G, a joint U.S.-Japanese naval exercise. In November, Chancellorsville fired guns and SM-2 missiles as part of MISSILEX 01-1. In March through June 2001, she visited Singapore, Thailand, Saipan and Sydney, Australia, as part of an extended Spring Cruise. Chancellorsville then entered dry dock for an upkeep period in the fall. In September 2001, Chancellorsville deployed with the Kitty Hawk Battle Group in support of Operation Enduring Freedom, operating in the theater for several months. Chancellorsville paid her first visit to Vladivostok, Russia, in July 2002, celebrating Independence Day in Russia along with Fort McHenry. In March 2003, the ship was assigned to Carrier Group Five. On 22 October 2003, Chancellorsville played host in Guam to two warships of the People's Republic of China, which made the first-ever visit of the Chinese navy to Guam. By May 2004, she was back in the Southwest Asian region, where she lent aid to a disabled Indonesian fishing boat.

On 19 July 2004, Chancellorsville departed Yokosuka to participate in Exercise Summer Pulse 2004 and Joint Air and Sea Exercises (JASEX) 2004, with the Kitty Hawk Battle Group. Summer Pulse was the Navy's first implementation of the new Fleet Response Plan (FRP). She returned to homeport 7 September. Chancellorsville entered a nine-week dry dock availability in February 2005. Following the maintenance period, she immediately returned to sea to participate in the exercises Talisman Saber 2005, the third annual Orange Crush and the Joint Air and Sea Exercise (JASEX) 2005. She returned to Yokosuka in August. ANNUALEX 2005 commenced in November with Chancellorsville participating, along with other U.S. and Japanese assets. The exercise saw a total of 61 naval vessels, including two U.S. submarines, 10 U.S. Navy ships and 49 Japanese ships. Chancellorsville visited Hong Kong at the end of November and returned to Yokosuka 12 December. In winter of 2006, Chancellorsville deployed again into the Western Pacific, visiting Singapore and Pattaya, Thailand, in February. In April, she joined forces of the Republic of Korea for Reception, Staging, Onward-movement, & Integration and Foal Eagle 2006 (RSOI/Foal Eagle 06), exercises utilizing more than 70 U.S. and Korean ships. Chancellorsville returned to Yokosuka in August to prepare for a hull swap with Shiloh based in San Diego. The crews remained in their respective locations.

=== 2010s ===
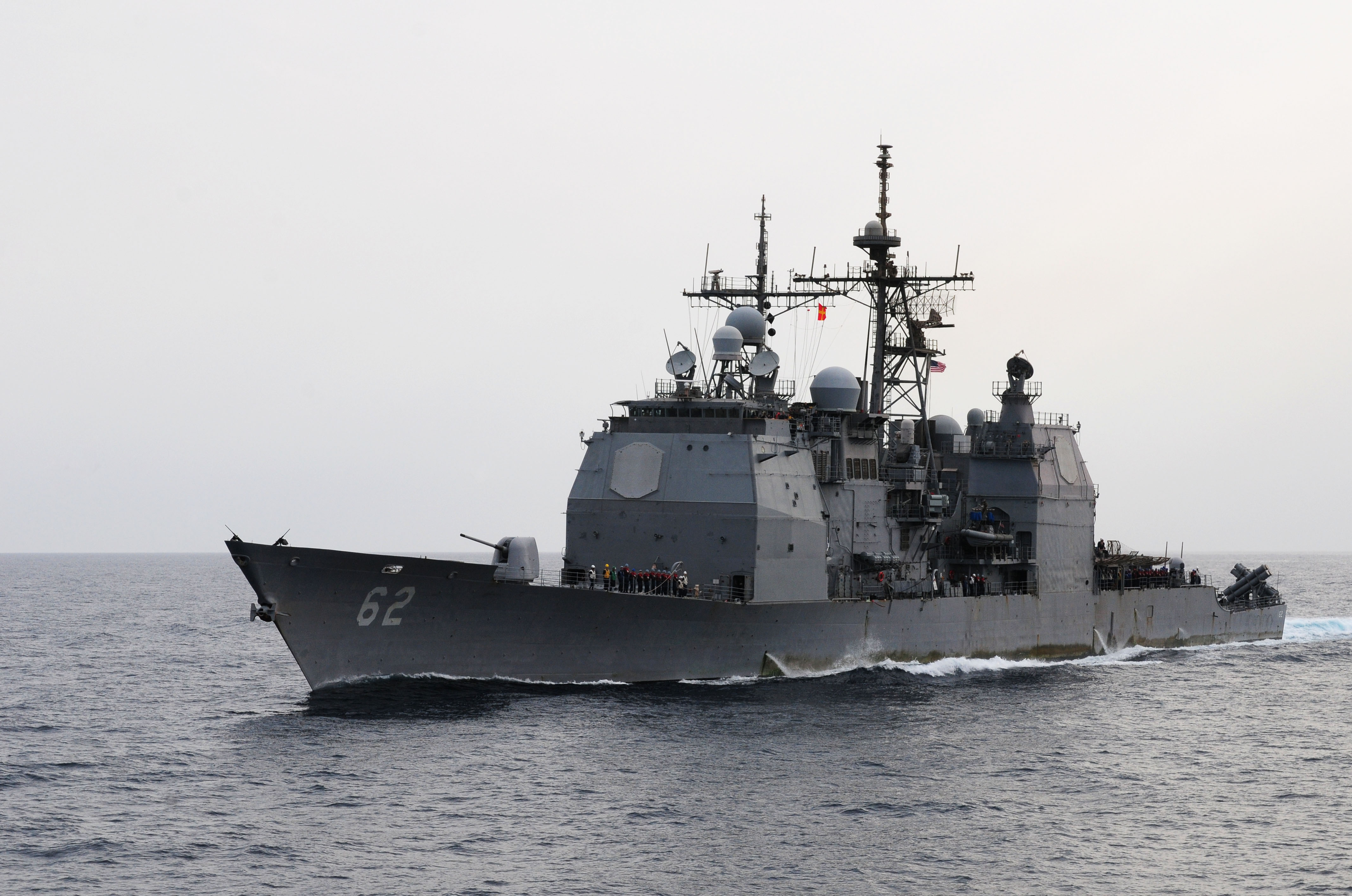
Chancellorsville transits alongside the aircraft carrier Ronald Reagan for a fueling at sea. (2011)

In March 2011, in company with the carrier Ronald Reagan, Chancellorsville was deployed off northeastern Honshu, Japan, to assist with relief efforts after the 2011 Tōhoku earthquake and tsunami. During that time, helicopter crews from Ronald Reagan were exposed to leaking radiation from the nuclear accidents and ships from the carrier strike group were moved to avoid being downwind from the facility.

During the latter half of 2012, Chancellorsville underwent equipment upgrades as part of the Aegis Modernization effort ACB-12. In January 2013, the ship spent five days under way off the coast of California to perform a series of tests of the updated ACB-12 equipment and software.

In November 2013, while testing combat weapons systems off the coast of Point Mugu, California, a BQM-74E unmanned drone being used in the exercise failed to respond to commands to turn away from the ship and collided with Chancellorsville. Since it was a tracking exercise and not a live fire exercise, the crew did not engage the drone with the Phalanx CIWS. Two sailors received treatment for minor burns and the ship suffered some damage and returned to San Diego for assessment. The damage later proved to be more severe than initially assessed. Citing Navy sources, the U.S. Naval Institute reported that repairs to the ship would cost $30 million and take six months to complete.

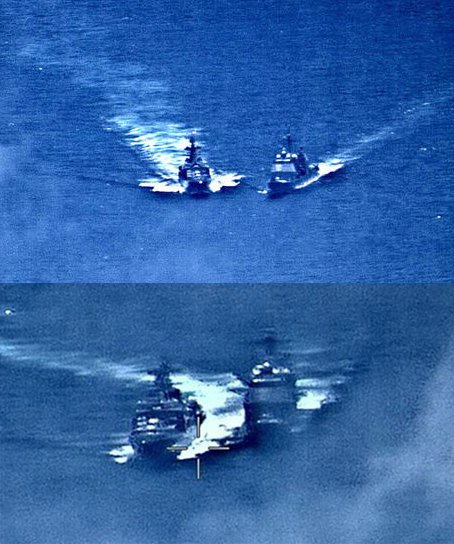
A photo released by the USN showing a near collision between Chancellorsville (right) and the Russian destroyer Admiral Vinogradov (2019)

On 7 June 2019 Chancellorsville came close to a collision with the Russian destroyer Admiral Vinogradov. Each side blamed the other for the near collision. Russian sources stated that the incident occurred in the southeast of the East China Sea while US sources named the location as in the Philippine Sea. According to retired US Navy captain Carl Schuster, the Russian ship's wake shows that it "didn't adhere to either the rules of the road or the incidents at sea agreement." United States Seventh Fleet spokesman Commander Clayton Doss said the Russian destroyer came within 50 to 100 feet (15 to 30 m) of Chancellorsville, "putting the safety of her crew and ship at risk." The Russian Navy released a statement claiming that Chancellorsville had "suddenly changed its course and crossed the Admiral Vinogradov destroyer's course some 50 meters away from the ship." According to the same statement, this caused Admiral Vinogradov to take an "emergency maneuver" in order to avoid a collision with the American ship. In November 2019 and again on 15 February 2020, the ship transited the Taiwan Strait.

=== 2020s ===
During the 2020 George Floyd protests, the name of the ship came into question because it honored a victory of the Confederate army fighting against the United States for southern independence and in defense of slavery. In December 2020, the U.S. Navy's Report to Congress on the Annual Long-Range Plan for Construction of Naval Vessels stated that the ship was planned to be placed Out of Commission in Reserve in 2026.

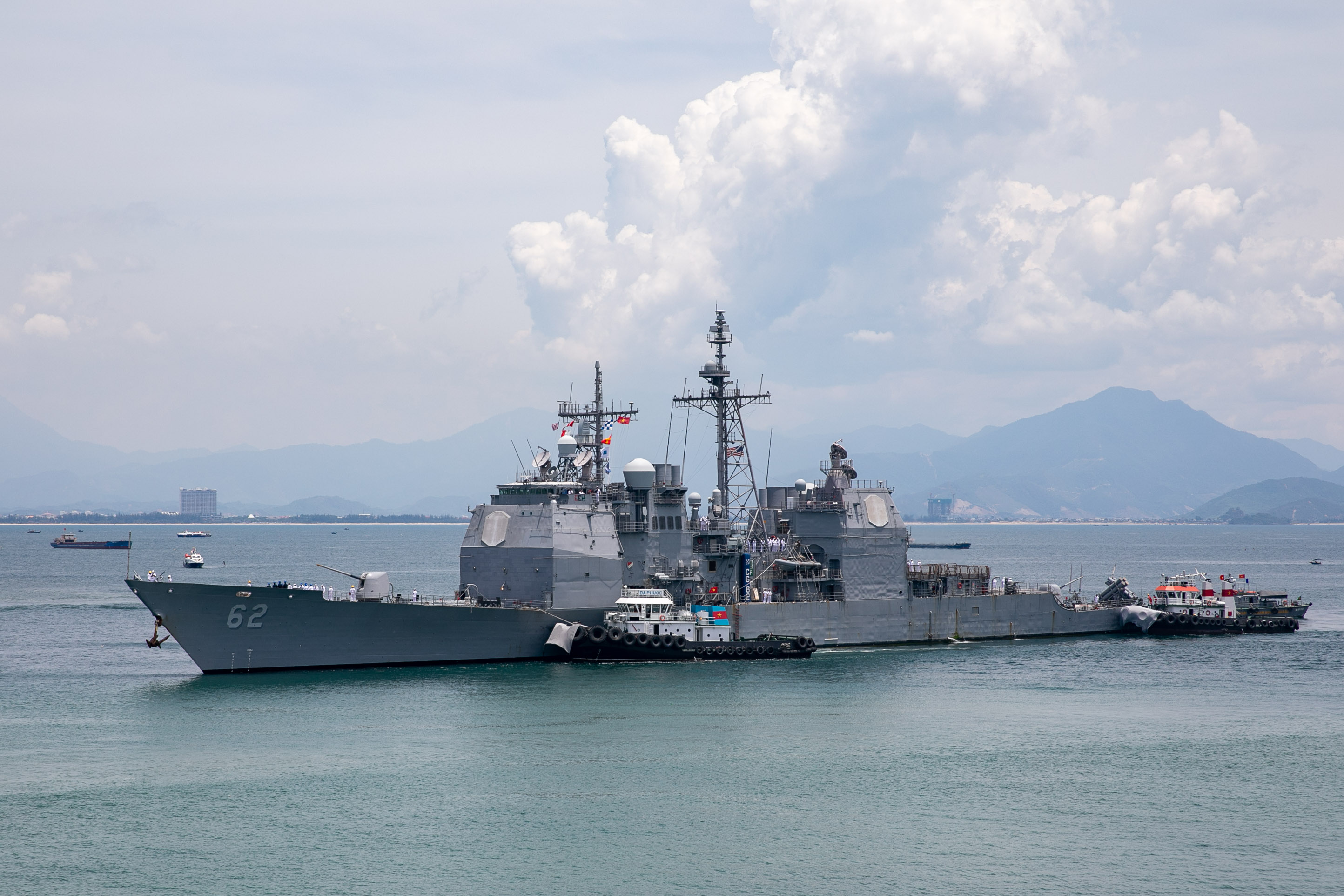
USS Robert Smalls arrives for a port visit in Da Nang, Vietnam. (2023)

In May 2022, Chancellorsville was homeported out of Yokosuka, Japan. She was as part of Carrier Strike Group 5 led by the carrier Ronald Reagan. On 28 August 2022, Chancellorsville along with sister ship Antietam conducted a routine transit through the Taiwan Strait. This was the first such transit to occur since the 2022 visit by Nancy Pelosi to Taiwan.

==== Ship renaming ====
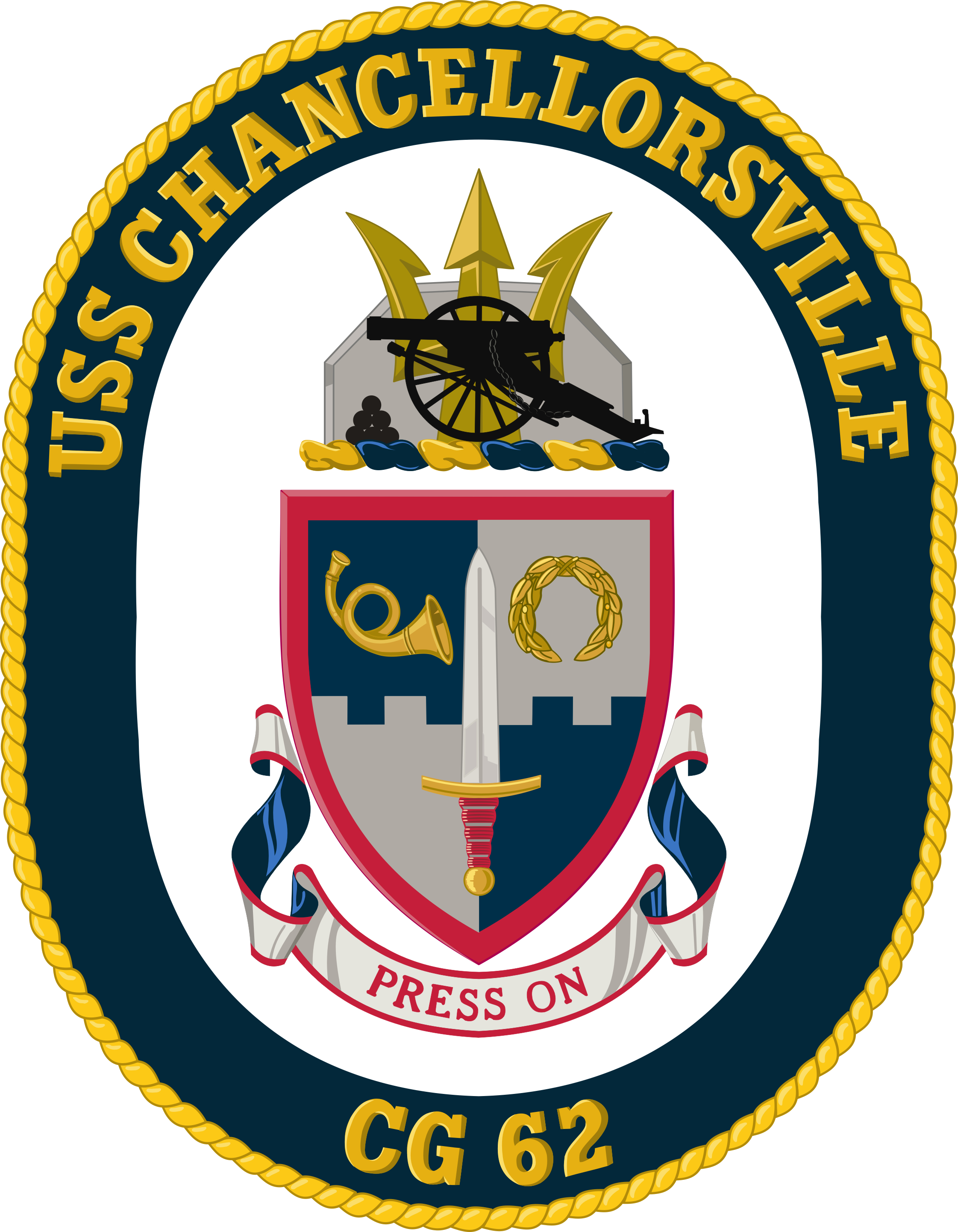
The crest of ex-USS Chancellorsville, which included an inverted wreath that commemorated the death of Confederate general Stonewall Jackson

The National Defense Authorization Act for Fiscal Year 2021 created a new Naming Commission to examine names across the US armed forces that honor the Confederate States, the group of states that attempted to break away from the US during the American Civil War. Chancellorsville was explicitly named in early news reports about the commission due to its clear association with the Confederate victory at the Battle of Chancellorsville, which included a portrait of generals Robert E. Lee and Thomas "Stonewall" Jackson in the cruiser's wardroom. The painting was removed in 2016. The commission's report noted that Chancellorsville's crest also included an inverted wreath that commemorated the death of Jackson during the Battle of Chancellorsville.

In September 2022, the Naming Commission recommended that the US Navy rename two shore installations, USNS Maury (T-AGS-66) (named for Matthew Fontaine Maury, who chose to fight for the Confederates), and Chancellorsville. The choice of what to rename them to was left to the Secretary of the Navy. As part of its report, the Commission judged that the ship celebrated the Confederacy.

On 27 February 2023, the Secretary of the Navy Carlos Del Toro announced that the US Navy would rename Chancellorsville after Robert Smalls, a slave who commandeered the Confederate ship CSS Planter in 1862. The name change was made effective on 1 March 2023, The Navy held a ceremony to mark the change that was designed to not disrupt the ship's activities. and deployed with the Ronald Reagan carrier strike group in May 2023. Robert Smalls made a port visit to Da Nang, Vietnam in June 2023. Robert Smalls participated in exercise Talisman Sabre 2023 in July 2023.

In 2026, it was announced Robert Smalls will switch its homeport from Yokosuka to San Diego, with the destroyer USS Mustin taking its place.

== Awards and decorations ==
- Navy E Ribbon - (1994, 1995, 1999, 2000, 2001, 2002, 2003)
- Spokane Trophy Award (1996, 2016)
- PACFLT Anti-Submarine Warfare (ASW) Bloodhound Award – 2015

Joint Meritorious Unit Award		Navy Unit Commendation
Navy Meritorious Unit Commendation (4)	Battle Effectiveness Award with E device (7)	National Defense Service Medal (2)
Armed Forces Expeditionary Medal	Southwest Asia Service Medal with one campaign star	Global War on Terrorism Expeditionary Medal
Humanitarian Service Medal	Sea Service Ribbon (12)	Kuwait Liberation Medal (Kuwait)

== General and cited references ==
- Plunkett, Kyle (6 April 2017). "Chancellorsville Earns 2016 Battle 'E'" (Press release). FLEACT, Yokosuka Public Affairs. Archived from the original on 20 July 2019.
