= Spokane Trophy =

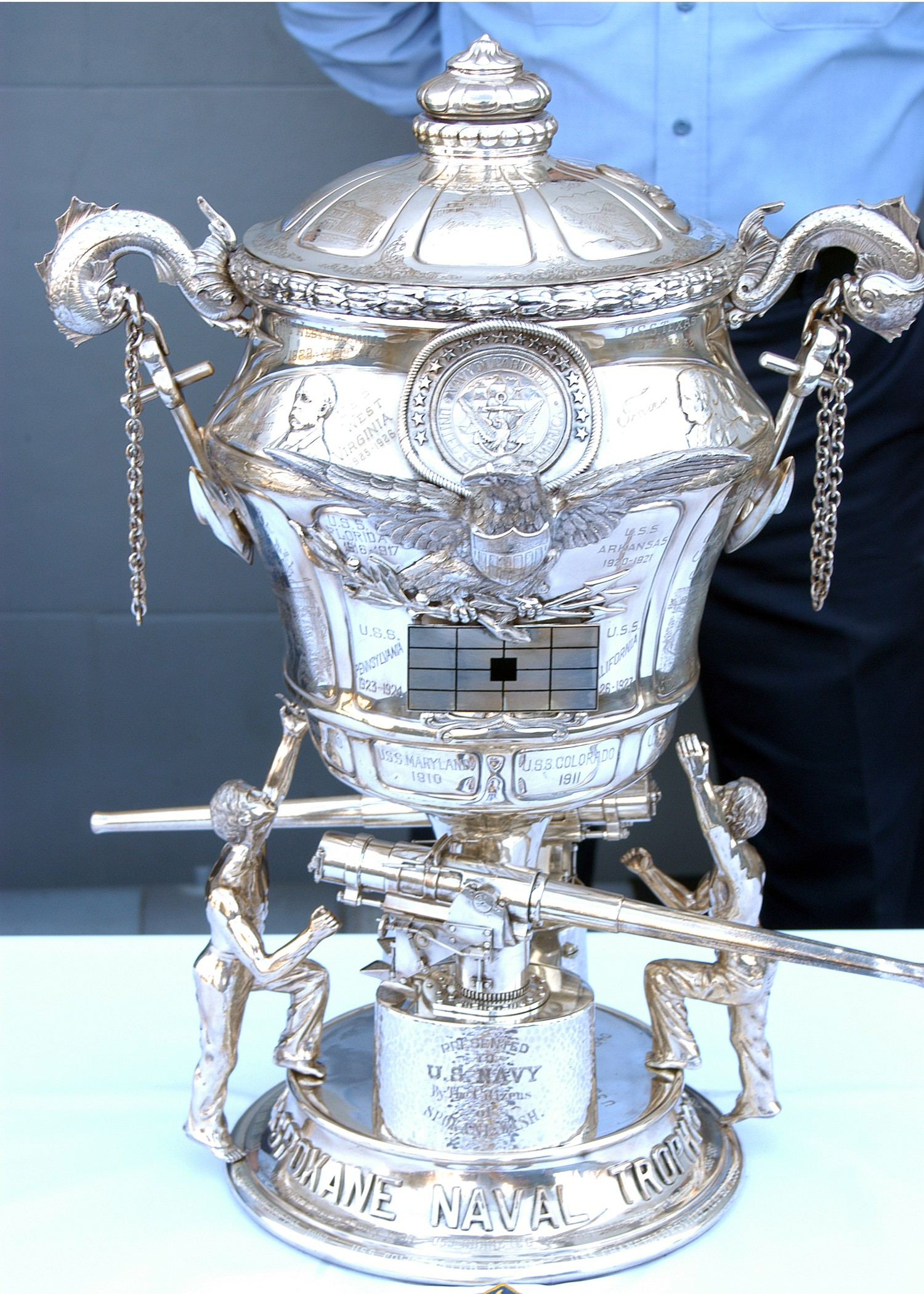
The Spokane Trophy at the time of its award to USS Princeton in 2004

The Spokane Trophy is awarded by Commander United States Pacific Fleet on a cycle basis to the surface combatant ship considered to be the most proficient in overall combat systems readiness and warfare operations. The nomination will be submitted by the type commander based on the recommendations of the ISIC (Immediate Superior In Charge). Because the award is to recognize demonstrated ability to fully conduct, on a sustained basis, simultaneous and coordinated air warfare, surface warfare, and undersea warfare operations with all installed equipment, no check-off list of particular criteria is appropriate nor can a ship explicitly work for nomination for the award other than by routinely striving for the highest levels of combat systems training and material excellence. The actual Spokane Trophy is made of 400 ounces of silver and is valued at $4 million.

The award was established in 1908 by President Theodore Roosevelt to recognize naval warfighting proficiency. The trophy was originally donated by the Spokane, Washington Navy League and is now kept on display at Naval Surface Forces headquarters in San Diego. The trophy depicts areas of Spokane, Washington, and the silver mining community. The trophy also bears the names of the last 96 ships that have won it, including USS Arizona (BB-39) and USS West Virginia (BB-48). It is normally kept under armed guard and is viewed only once per year for the presentation ceremony.

Unlike the Battenberg Cup for the Atlantic Fleet, this award honors surface ships only, while the Battenberg honors both surface and submarine combatants.

== History ==
In 1907, the Spokane Chamber of Commerce in conjunction with the city's United Spanish War Veterans wanted to honor Spokane sailors, its "Sons in the Navy", by offering a silver cup as an annual award to the U.S. Atlantic Fleet for marksmanship. Donated by the city and citizens of Spokane, the Spokane Trophy would become the most sought after award in the U.S. Navy, though many, for a time, would forget it existed.

The city was desirous to honor its sailors and President Theodore Roosevelt's "man behind the gun". With the memory of Spokane's own John Robert Monaghan, a sailor who sacrificed his own life to save a fellow officer in a "skirmish with the natives" in Samoa in 1899, Spokane was proud of our country's navy and wanted to honor "the men who wear the blue". Originally intended to be awarded to the best ship in the Atlantic Fleet for excellence in great-gun marksmanship in the annual target practice, Secretary of the NavyVictor H. Metcalf suggested instead that the trophy be awarded to the battleship or armored cruiser of either fleet who exhibited the highest final record of merit with all her turret guns. Metcalf pointed out that "President [Roosevelt] interested himself personally in the question of trophies for excellence in great-gun marksmanship, and directed that the vessels of the Navy be divided into four classes, namely battleships, cruisers, gunboats, and torpedo craft and that a trophy be assigned to each."

The Spokane Trophy was designed to embody the spirit of Spokane and its pride in the navy. In bas-relief on the trophy are eight memorial panels or scenes depicting President Theodore Roosevelt, the Secretary of the Navy Victor H. Metcalf, the Spokane Falls, Mount Spokane, the newly built Spokane Federal Building (old Post Office), the last of the great chiefs, Chief Garry of the Spokanes, Fort George Wright, and a replica of the monument to Ensign John Monaghan, Spokane's own naval hero. Standing approximately 28 inches high and 16 inches wide at the handles, made of 400 ounces of sterling silver and lined with gold, the Spokane Trophy was crafted by Leo M. Dornberg & Co., a local jeweler, at the request of the Spokane Chamber of Commerce for $1,500 in 1907. Mounted on a rosewood base, the trophy is flanked by two miniature solid silver navy gunners training 10 inch long silver guns mounted on gold wheels. A feminine figure on the trophy represents Spokane presenting a laurel wreath to the naval gunners whose hands are outstretched to receive it. An American eagle clutches a naval target on the opposite side of the trophy and the handles represent weighed anchors.

In 1908, USS Tennessee became the first winner of the trophy. The trophy was formally presented to the officers and sailors of the ship in the Puget Sound Naval Shipyard, Washington on August 12, 1908. Spokane Chamber of Commerce vice-president David T. Ham spoke, as did representatives on behalf of the Spanish War Veterans. According to an account at the time, the trophy was received positively:

The cup was covered with the Admiral’s colors as it was borne from the captain’s cabin to a raised platform on the main deck, where Captain [Bradley A.] Fiske, in his speech of acceptance, referred in eloquent terms motive which prompted the giving of the Spokane Trophy cup and of the great benefit that would ultimately result in the future efficiency of naval gunnery, and said that was a standing cause for wonder and surprise to the entire Navy that the inland city of Spokane should be the first to do honor to the men behind the gun and thus create that pride in individual effort and in the efficiency of general service that must and would build a greater Navy…

The pomp and ceremony that followed the trophy through its first award presentation, resulted in some playful animosity from the officers and crew of the USS Washington, of which the commanding officer, Austin M. Knight, was present:

Captain Austin M. Knight, of the cruiser Washington, invited the Spokane party to visit his ship and accept some hospitality in deference to the grand state for which the ship was named. Captain Knight and his officers were greatly chagrined that the cruiser Washington did not win the Spokane Trophy, and said that Spokane will be honored by the Washington winning the cup the next year if they have to blow up every turret and gun in the ship.

The trophy was awarded annually to ships in the Pacific and Atlantic Fleet until it was retired in 1941, prior to World War II, and placed on display for many years at the Naval Museum in Washington D.C. before being moved to the Naval Historical Center in the Washington Navy Yard in 1977. In 1984, the Spokane Trophy was reactivated and sent to the U.S. Pacific Force Headquarters in San Diego. In keeping with historic tradition, the trophy, now worth nearly $4 million, is annually awarded to the United States Pacific Fleet surface ship that demonstrates overall excellence in combat systems and warfare readiness. The trophy has been awarded forty-two times to thirty-one different ships. In 2007 the trophy was awarded to the USS Chafee, an Arleigh Burke-class Aegis destroyer homeported in Hawaii. USS Hopper was the 2008 Spokane Awardee, and is also homeported in Pearl Harbor, Hawaii. The officers and crew of guided-missile destroyer USS Curtis Wilbur, forward-deployed to Commander Fleet Activities Yokosuka, learned their command was announced as the 2009 Spokane Trophy recipient on April 15, 2010. In 2011 USS Sampson, homeported in San Diego, won the trophy. In 2013 it was USS Mobile Bay, also homeported in San Diego, that won it. The trophy was awarded in 2014 to the USS Preble, homeported in San Diego, CA. In 2016 it was awarded to the USS Chancellorsville, the second time the ship had received "this prestigious award".

The crew of the Arleigh Burke-class guided-missile destroyer USS Wayne E. Meyer assembled on the forecastle to receive the prestigious Spokane Trophy during a ceremony, May 7, 2015.

The crew of the guided-missile cruiser USS Princeton received the 2017 Spokane Trophy during a ceremony on board the ship, October 19, 2018.

The crew of the guided-missile destroyer USS Dewey received the 2018 Spokane Trophy during a ceremony aboard the ship, September 26, 2019.

The crew of the guided-missile destroyer USS Milius received the 2019 Spokane Trophy. USS Milius is home-ported in Yokosuka, Japan and attached to Commander, Destroyer Squadron Fifteen (CDS 15).

The crew of the guided-missile destroyer USS Stockdale received the 2024 Spokane Trophy. USS Stockdale is home-ported in San Diego, California. During her 2024-25 deployment to 5th fleet, Stockdale participated in more combat than any other U.S. Navy ship since the end of World War II.

The crew of the guided-missile destroyer USS Sterett received the Spokane Trophy in both 2023 and 2025. Sterett is home-ported in San Diego, California and deployed under Destroyer Squadron One in both years she received the award. Sterett''s 2025 award resulted from accomplishments during a combat deployment to the 5th Fleet area of operations.

The Spokane Trophy, with the help of the Spokane Council of the Navy League of the United States and Navy Operational Support Center (NOSC) Spokane, returned home to Spokane, Washington, in the spring of 2008 for its 100th anniversary.
