= Captain Edward F. Ney Memorial Award =

Food service award for US Navy galleys

The Captain Edward F. Ney Award for food-service excellence is given to the best US Navy galleys among those that earn a five-star rating from a Navy evaluation team.

The Secretary of the Navy and the International Food Service Executives Association (IFSEA) established the Capt. Edward F. Ney Memorial Awards Program in 1958. The award is designed to improve food-service operations and recognize the best general messes in the Navy.

Capt. Ney served as head of the Subsistence Division of the Bureau of Supplies and Accounts between 1940 and 1945.

After 1999, the Ney Awards are determined by a one-day, surprise inspection conducted by evaluation teams made up of senior Navy mess-management specialists and members of the IFSEA. Prior to that, the inspections were scheduled.

In 2024, there were 7 award winners divided between Afloat General Messes and Ashore General Messes. Afloat general messes had 4 categories, submarine, small-medium afloat, large afloat and aircraft carrier. Ashore had 3 categories, West coast, east coast and outside continental US (OCONUS).
