= Mark 34 Gun Weapon System =

U.S. Navy gun control system

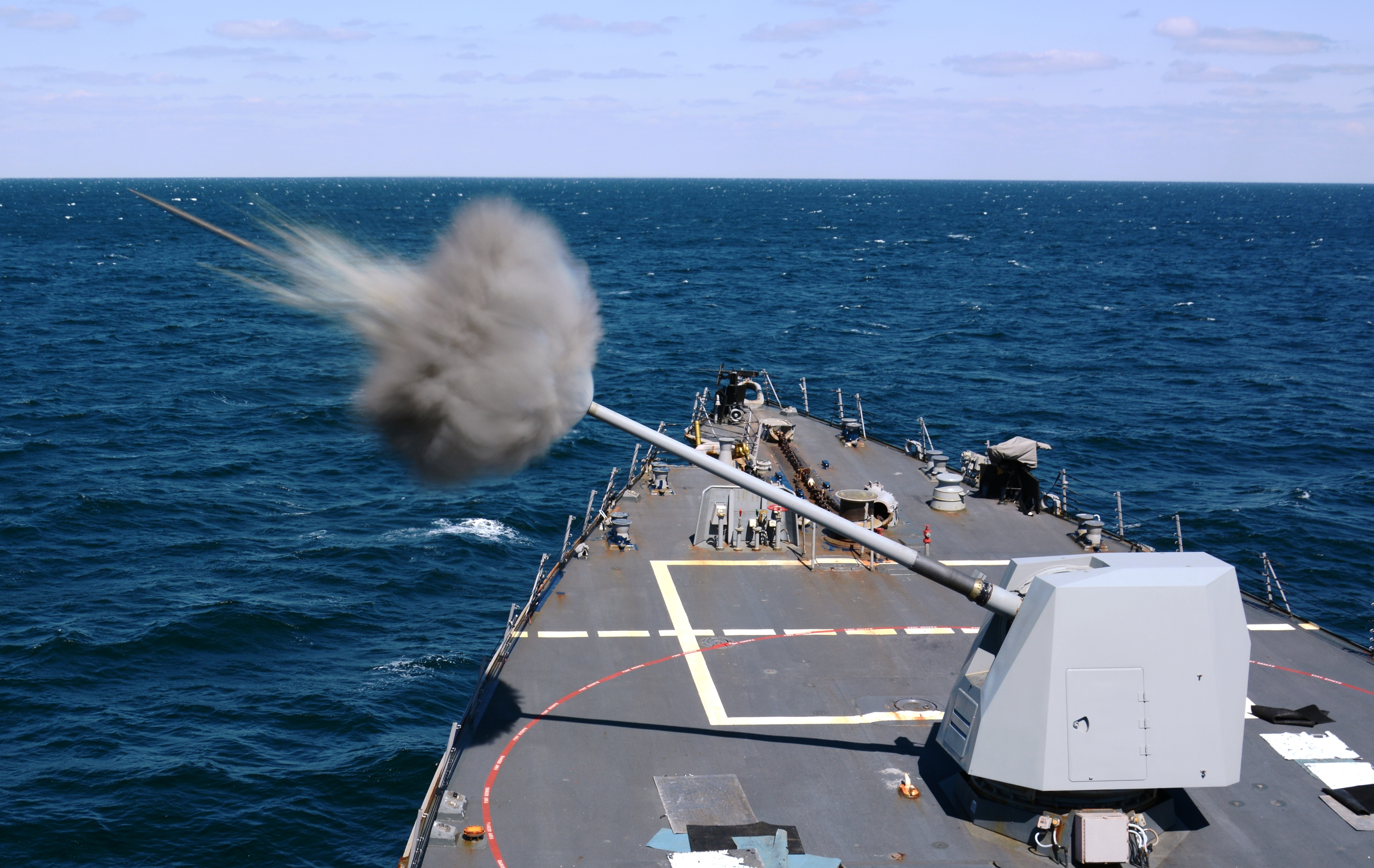
USS Mason fires her Mark 45 Mod 4

The Mark 34 Gun Weapon System (GWS) is a component of the Aegis Combat System that is responsible for controlling and providing fire control to the 127 mm 5" Mark 45 gun. It is used on the U.S. Navy Arleigh Burke-class destroyer and several later Ticonderoga-class cruisers. The Mk 34 GWS receives target data from the ship's sensors and off-ship sources, performs ballistic calculations, and produces gun control orders. The system is made up of the gun mount itself, the fire-control computer, and an optical sight.

The Mk 34 GWS was developed to improve the Arleigh Burke-class destroyer's ability to use the Mk 45 gun against a variety of threats. It is different from previous gun fire-control systems in that it was developed under a one-system concept and is a fully integrated subsystem of Aegis. The Aegis Command and Decision (C&D) system issues target engagement orders to the Mk 34 GWS.

== Components ==
The Mark 34 Gun Weapon System consists of three components:

- 5" Mark 45 gun
- Mark 160 Gun Computer System
- Mark 46 Optical Sight System or Mark 20 Electro-Optical Sight System

=== 5" Mark 45 gun ===
The 127 mm 5"/54 caliber or 5"/62 caliber Mark 45 gun is fully-automated and capable of engaging surface targets in an anti-ship role, air targets in an anti-aircraft or defensive anti-missile role, and land targets in a naval gunfire support role. The gun has a range of 13 nmi (24.1 km) for 5"/54 variants or 20 nmi (37.0 km) for the 5"/62 variant. Its maximum rate of fire is 16–20 rounds per minute.

=== Mark 160 Gun Computer System (GCS) ===
The Mark 160 GCS is responsible for receiving target information from the ship's sensors and computing a ballistic solution based on the selected ammunition type. Using the solution, the Mk 160 GCS provides control and fire orders to the Mark 45 gun.

The Mark 160 Gun Computer System consists of:

- Gun computer console (GCC) – Located in the ship's Combat Information Center (CIC), it is the primary interface between the Mk 34 GWS, the Aegis C&D system, and the ship's sensors. Transmits target information to the SDC/GMP.
- Computer display console (CDC) – Allows the operator to control the system.
- Recorder-reproducer – Used to load operational programs and retrieve system operational data.
- Signal data converter/Gun mount processor (SDC/GMP) – The GMP computes ballistic solutions for the selected target and the SDC feeds them to the gun mount.
- Gun mount control panel (GMCP) – Backup interface for the GCC.
- Velocimeter – A Doppler radar system directly above or next to the gun barrel that measures each fired projectile's initial velocity (IV). The GMP uses the IV data for ballistic solution corrections.

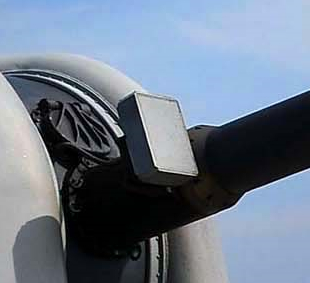
Velocimeter of 5"/54 caliber Mk 45 gun aboard USS The Sullivans (DDG-68)

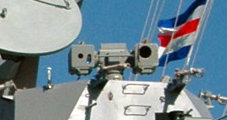
ADSU of Mk 46 OSS aboard USS Chafee (DDG-90)

=== Mark 46 Optical Sight System (OSS) ===
Developed by Kollmorgen in the 1990s, the Mark 46 Mod 0–1 OSS is a stabilized imaging sensor. It improves ships' situational awareness, aids in navigation, enables the crew to visually identify and track targets, and supplements the main combat sensors. The OSS is particularly useful in congested waters with multiple contacts and during nighttime operations. The OSS supports the Mark 34 GWS by providing a very accurate range using its laser. During an engagement, it can be used to visually determine if the threat has been eliminated. A shock isolation unit is designed to keep the OSS operational in the event the ship is hit.

The Mark 46 Optical Sight System consists of:

- Above Deck Sensor Unit (ADSU) – Stabilized two-axis director with a daylight imaging sensor, a thermal imaging sensor, and a laser rangefinder.
- Control and Display Unit (CDU) – Located in the CIC, it provides the display feed from the OSS sensors and is used to operate the OSS.
- Stabilization Electronics Unit (SEU) – Moves the ADSU and routes signals to/from it.

=== Mark 20 Electro-Optical Sight System (EOSS) ===
L3Harris developed the Mk 20 EOSS, which improves upon the Mk 46 OSS. It features more modern technologies that offer a higher image resolution. The Mk 20 EOSS is lighter and more modular. These have led to it being installed on the U.S. Navy's littoral combat ships and the U.S. Coast Guard's Legend-class cutters. Some Arleigh Burke-class destroyers are now also being fitted with the Mk 20 Mod 1 EOSS instead of the Mk 46 Mod 1 OSS.

== Operation ==
The Mark 34 GWS has four modes of operation:

- Surface Direct Fire Mode
- Naval Gunfire Support Mode
- Anti-aircraft Mode
- Support Mode

=== Surface Direct Fire (SDF) Mode ===
SDF mode is used for the engagement of a surface target. The ship's main radar (e.g., AN/SPY-1D on Flight I–IIA Arleigh Burke-class destroyers, AN/SPY-6 on Flight III Arleigh Burke-class destroyers) is the primary source of target data. The secondary surface search radar (e.g., AN/SPS-67 on earlier Arleigh Burke-class destroyers, AN/SPQ-9B on later Arleigh Burke-class destroyers) serves as a secondary source of targeting information. The Mk 46 OSS or Mk 20 EOSS supplements the radars. These sensors work together to provide high-quality target data to the GMP.

In the event of sensor or GCS failure, the Mk 45 gun can still be manually directed (e.g., inputting coordinates, range, etc.).

=== Naval Gunfire Support (NGFS) Mode ===
NGFS mode is used for engaging indirect land targets which cannot be tracked by the ship's sensors. NGFS is instead accomplished using operator-entered data, such as the target's coordinates. There are four submodes of NGFS mode:

- Grid Navigational Reference
- Relative Navigational Reference
- Grid Dead Reckoning
- Relative Dead Reckoning

=== Anti-aircraft Mode ===
Operation under anti-aircraft mode is similar to operation under SDF mode, though there are limitations to what sensors are able to track the air target, depending on its nature. For example, the AN/SPQ-9B can detect sea-skimming anti-ship missiles but would not contribute to the engagement of a high-flying aircraft. Often, the SPY-1 or SPY-6 would be the only source of target data. The SDC/GMP additionally sends fuze orders for variable time fuze shells.

=== Support Mode ===
Support mode is used to calibrate the Mk 34 GWS. The Mk 45 gun shoots several rounds, which are tracked by the SPY-1 or SPY-6 radar. Their trajectory is compared to the expected trajectory, and data used by the Mk 34 GWS is updated to correct the shots.
