= Light Airborne Multi-Purpose System =

United States Navy program

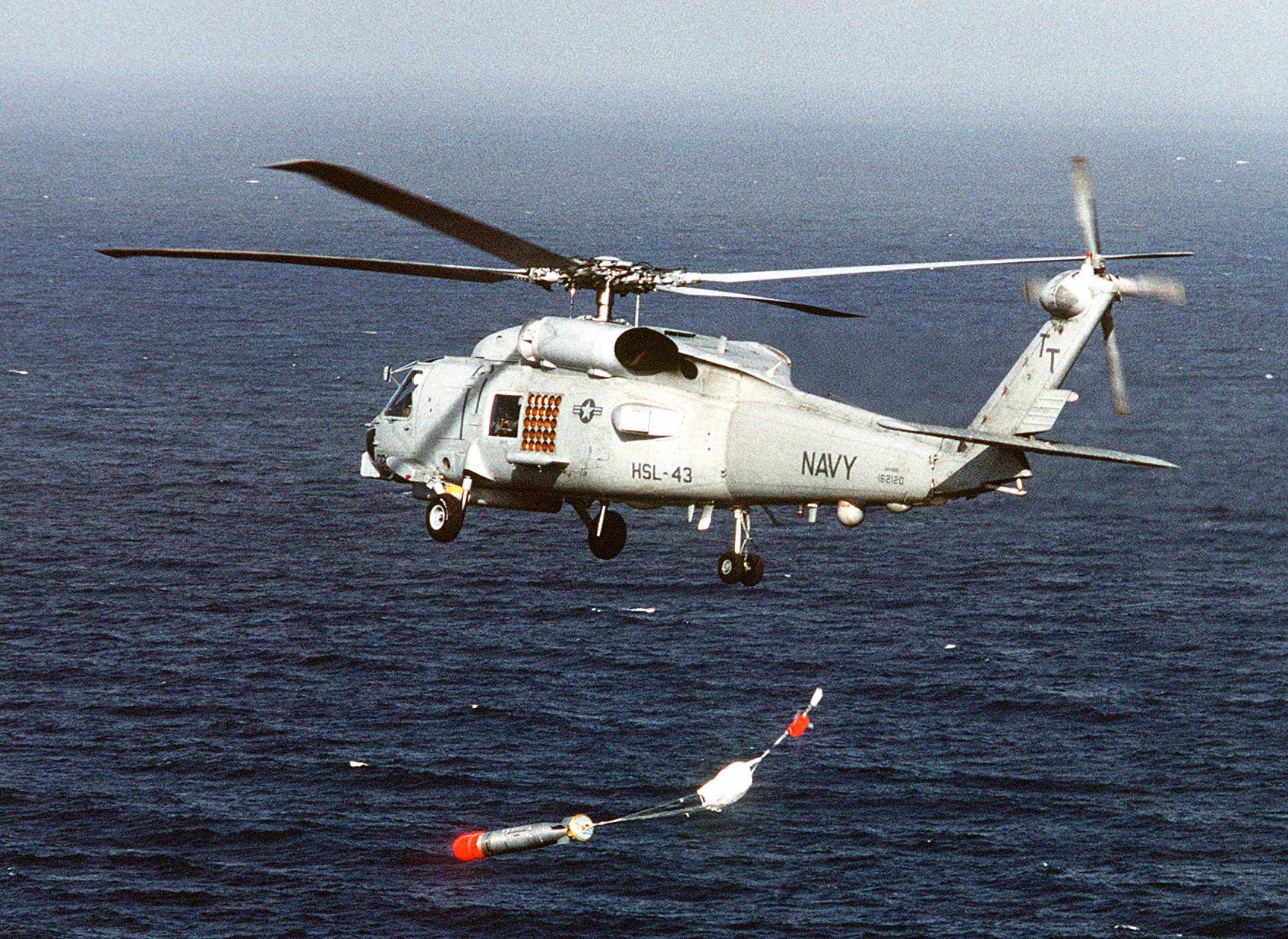
An SH-60B Seahawk helicopter releasing a Mark 46 torpedo

The Light Airborne Multi-Purpose System (LAMPS) is the United States Navy's program that develops crewed helicopters to assist the surface fleet in anti-submarine warfare.

The purpose of LAMPS is to scout outside the limits of a fleet's radar and sonar range to detect and track enemy submarines or missile-equipped escort ships and feed the real-time data back to their LAMPS mothership. They also have the capability to directly engage enemy targets with depth charges or torpedoes, or indirectly engage the enemy by coordinating fleet assets on site.

A Mk II version was planned, but was canceled in favor of the more advanced Mk III. LAMPS III added the capabilities to use anti-ship missile systems (like the AGM-119 Penguin anti-ship missile) and night vision capability.

== History ==
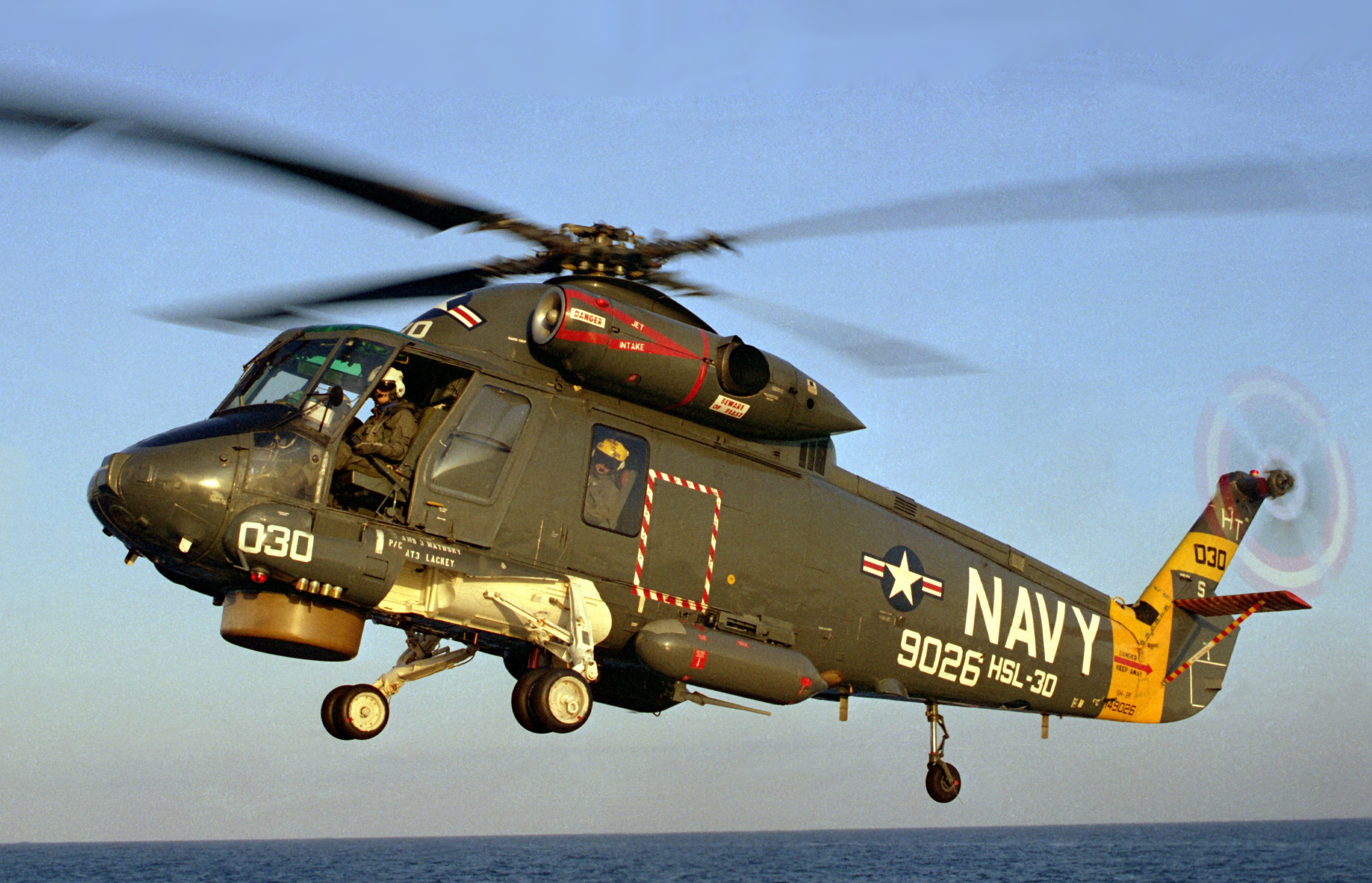
An SH-2F Seasprite of the US Navy

In October 1970, the UH-2 was selected to be the platform to function as the interim Light Airborne Multi-Purpose System (LAMPS) helicopter. During the course of the 1960s, LAMPS had evolved out of an urgent requirement to develop a crewed helicopter that would be capable of supporting a non-aviation vessel and serve as its tactical Anti-Submarine Warfare arm. Widely referred to as LAMPS Mark I, the advanced sensors, processors, and display capabilities aboard the helicopter enabled such equipped ships to extend their situational awareness beyond the line-of-sight limitations that unavoidably hampered the performance of shipboard radars, as well as the short distances involved in the acoustic detection and prosecution of underwater threats associated with hull-mounted sonars. Those H-2s that were reconfigured to perform the LAMPS mission were accordingly re-designated as SH-2Ds.

During the 1970s, the U.S. Navy began looking for a new helicopter to replace the SH-2F. Advances in sensor and avionic technology lead to the LAMPS Mk II suite being developed by the Naval Air Development Center. The Navy then conducted a competition in 1974 to develop the Lamps MK III concept which would integrate both the aircraft and shipboard systems. The Navy selected IBM Federal Systems to be the Prime systems integrator for the Lamps MK III concept.

Since the SH-2 was not large enough to carry the Navy's required equipment, a new airframe was required. In the mid-1970s, the Army evaluated the Sikorsky YUH-60 and Boeing Vertol YUH-61 for its Utility Tactical Transport Aircraft System (UTTAS) competition. Navy based its requirements on the Army's UTTAS specification to decrease costs from commonality to be the new airframe to carry the Lamps MK III avionics. Sikorsky and Boeing-Vertol submitted proposals for Navy versions of their Army UTTAS helicopters in April 1977 for review. The Navy also looked at helicopters being produced by Bell, Kaman, Westland and MBB, but these were too small for the mission. In early 1978 the Navy selected Sikorsky's S-70B design, which was designated "SH-60B Seahawk".

== Types ==
- Kaman SH-2F Seasprite (LAMPS Mk I, retired)
- Sikorsky SH-60B Seahawk (LAMPS Mk III)
- Sikorsky MH-60R Seahawk (LAMPS Mk III Block II Upgrade)

== See also ==
- PAVE

== Bibliography ==
- Frawley, Gerard. The International Directory of Military Aircraft. Aerospace Publications, 2002. ISBN 1-875671-55-2.
- Leoni, Ray D. Black Hawk, The Story of a World Class Helicopter. American Institute of Aeronautics and Astronautics, 2007. ISBN 978-1-56347-918-2
