= Laser weapon =

Directed-energy weapon using lasers

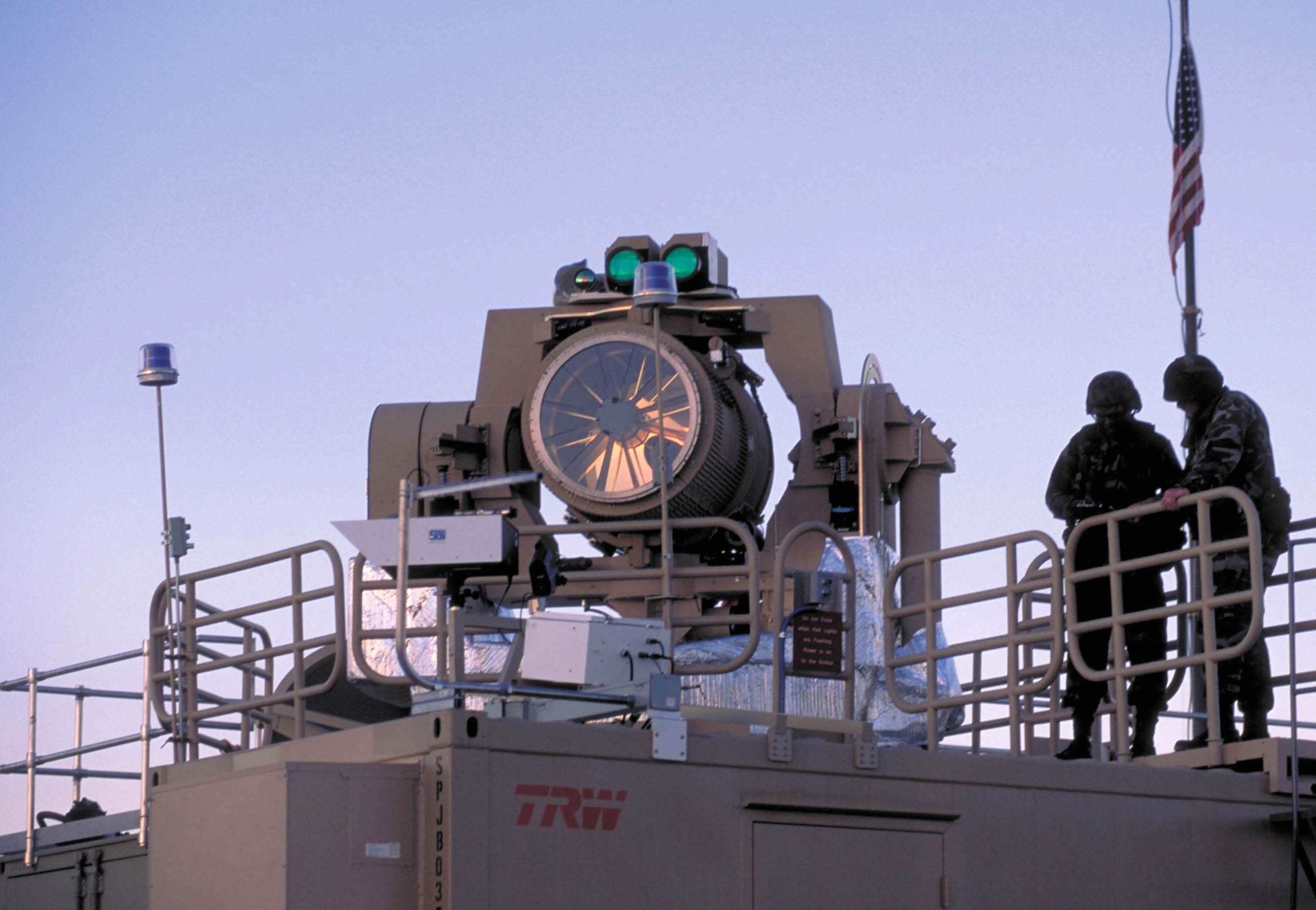
The US-Israeli Tactical High Energy Laser (THEL) was used to shoot down rockets and artillery shells before being canceled in 2005 as a result of "its bulkiness, high costs and poor anticipated results on the battlefield".

A laser weapon is a type of directed-energy weapon (DEW) that uses lasers to inflict damage. Laser weapons are of two types: low-power laser dazzlers that blind optical systems or human eyes, and high-power lasers that can physically damage or destroy targets, such as enemy aircraft, drones, and missiles.

One of the major issues with laser weapons is atmospheric thermal blooming, which is still largely unsolved. This issue is exacerbated when there is fog, smoke, dust, rain, snow, smog, foam, or purposely dispersed obscurant chemicals present. In essence, a laser generates a beam of light that requires clear air or a vacuum to operate.

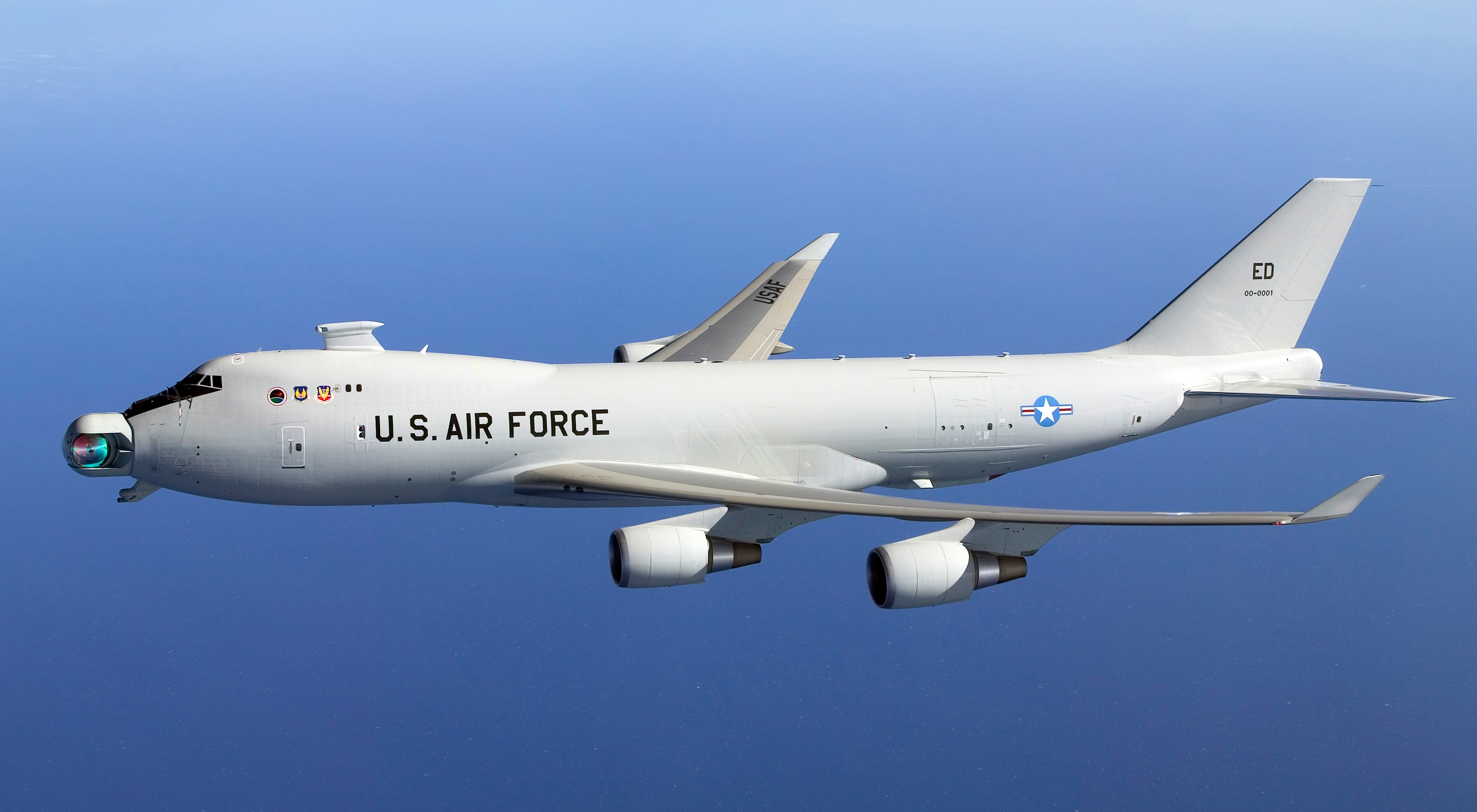
The YAL-1, a modified Boeing 747, owned by USAF. It was canceled in December 2011 and scrapped in September 2014.

YAL-1 live test

Low-power lasers have the potential to serve as non-lethal weapons. They can cause temporary or permanent vision loss. The extent, nature, and duration of visual impairment depend on factors including the laser's power, wavelength(s), beam collimation and orientation, and duration of exposure. Lasers with a power output of less than one watt can cause permanent vision loss. The Protocol on Blinding Laser Weapons bans weapons designed to cause permanent blindness. Weapons designed to cause temporary blindness, known as dazzlers, are in a separate category. Multiple incidents of pilots exposed to lasers while flying have been recorded.

High-power laser weapons capable of damaging or destroying a target are experimental as of 2026. The use of laser-beam weaponry to destroy aerial targets has been under development for years. The United States Navy tested short-range (1 mile), 30-kW Laser Weapon System or LaWS for use against targets such as small UAVs, rocket-propelled grenades, and visible motorboat or helicopter engines. A 60 kW system, HELIOS, was under development for destroyer-class ships as of 2020. India's DRDO successfully tested a 30 kW DEW, designated Mk-II (A) DEW, in April 2025 which could disable drones at a range of 5 km.

== Air defense systems ==
DEW for the destruction of incoming missiles are under development. One example is Boeing Airborne Laser, deployed inside a Boeing 747 and designated as YAL-1. This system was designed to eliminate short- and intermediate-range ballistic missiles during their boost phase. It was canceled in 2012.

Another system was studied under the Strategic Defense Initiative (SDI) and successor programs. This project aimed to employ ground-based or space-based laser systems to destroy incoming intercontinental ballistic missiles (ICBMs). However, various practical challenges, such as aiming a laser over a large distance through the atmosphere, complicated implementation. Optical scattering and refraction bent and distorted the beam, complicating aiming and reducing its efficiency.

A related concept was the nuclear-pumped X-ray laser, an orbiting atomic bomb surrounded by laser media in the form of glass rods. When a bomb detonated, the rods would be exposed to highly-energetic gamma-ray photons, causing spontaneous and stimulated emission of X-ray photons within the rod atoms. This process would result in optical amplification of the X-ray photons, generating an X-ray beam that was little affected by atmospheric distortion and capable of destroying ICBMs in flight. However, the X-ray laser became a single-use device, as it would destroy itself upon activation. Some initial tests were conducted with underground nuclear testing, but the results were not promising.

=== Iron Beam ===
Iron Beam is a laser-based air defense system which was unveiled at the Singapore Airshow on 11 February 2014 by Israeli defense contractor Rafael Advanced Defense Systems. The system is designed to destroy short-range rockets, artillery, and mortar bombs; it has a range of up to 7 km (4.3 mi), too close for the Iron Dome system to intercept projectiles effectively. In addition, the system could also intercept unmanned aerial vehicles (UAVs). Iron Beam will constitute the sixth element of Israel's integrated air defense system, in addition to Arrow 2, Arrow 3, David's Sling, Barak 8, and Iron Dome.

Iron Beam uses a fiber laser to destroy an airborne target. Whether acting as a stand-alone system or with external cueing as part of an air-defense system, a threat is detected by a surveillance system and tracked by vehicle platforms in order to engage.

Iron Beam was expected to be operational by the end of 2025 by implementing a prototype intended for combat during the Gaza war. While the system was delivered in December 2025, it was still not fully operational as of August 2026.

Both an anti-drone and an airborne version of the Iron Beam are in development by Rafael and Elbit Systems respectively.

=== Anti-drone systems ===
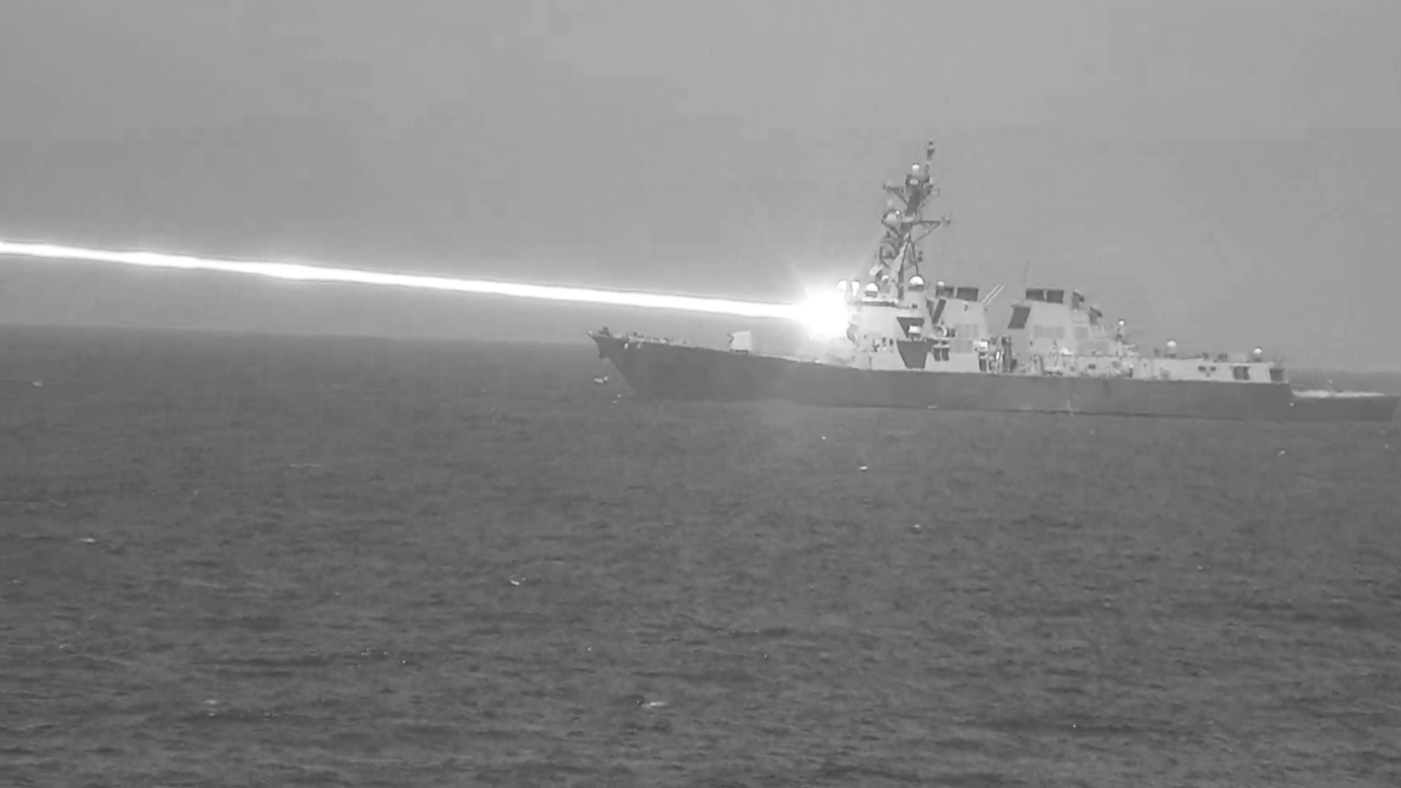
USS Preble (DDG-88) firing her HELIOS laser system, 3 February 2025

In the 21st century, several countries have developed anti-drone laser systems to counter the increasing threat of small unmanned aerial vehicles (UAVs). These systems are designed to detect, track, and destroy drones using high-powered lasers, offering a cost-effective and flexible solution for airspace protection.

In the United States, Lockheed Martin demonstrated the capabilities of its ATHENA laser system in 2017, which uses a 30-kilowatt ALADIN laser to target and destroy UAVs. Another American company, Raytheon, developed the High-Energy Laser Weapon System (HELWS) in 2019, which is capable of detecting and destroying drones at a distance of up to three kilometers.

Turkey has also invested in the development of laser weapons, with companies like Roketsan producing the ALKA system, which combines laser and electromagnetic weapons to incapacitate and destroy single or group targets. Other Turkish companies, such as Aselsan and TUBITAK BILGEM, have also demonstrated laser systems capable of targeting small UAVs and explosive devices.

Germany is another leader in the development of combat laser systems, with defense company Rheinmetall working on stationary and mobile versions of its High Energy Laser (HEL) system since the 2000s. Rheinmetall's lasers are designed to protect against a variety of threats, including small and medium-sized UAVs, helicopters, missiles, mines, and artillery shells.

Israel has also been actively developing laser weapons, with companies like Rafael Advanced Defense Systems demonstrating the compact Drone Dome system in 2020, which is designed to destroy UAVs and their swarms. Another Israeli system, called Light Blade, was developed by OptiDefense to counter terrorist threats such as mini UAVs and explosive devices attached to balloons or kites.

First announced in December 2024, on April 13 2025, the Ukrainian Unmanned Systems Forces released the first footage of a laser weapon system, called “Tryzub”, in use destroying a fibre optic FPV drone. It is fitted into the back of a van and can be used against ground targets.

On 16 May 2025, Ukraine revealed a small laser turret called SlimBeam, fitted to a remote controlled weapon station, capable of blinding optical sensors at 2 km and destroying drones at 800 meters. It can be remotely operated by a web-based system to reduce the risk to the operators of enemy fire. It could also be used for sabotage by targeting various locks or other objects.

== Electrolaser ==
An electrolaser first ionizes its target path, and then sends an electric current down the conducting track of ionized plasma, somewhat like lightning. It functions as a giant, high-energy, long-distance version of the Taser or stun gun.

== Pulsed energy projectile ==
Pulsed Energy Projectile or PEP systems emit an infrared laser pulse which creates rapidly expanding plasma at the target. The resulting sound, shock and electromagnetic waves stun the target and cause pain and temporary paralysis. The weapon is under development and is intended as a non-lethal weapon in crowd control, though it can also be used as a lethal weapon.

== Dazzler ==
A dazzler is a directed-energy weapon intended to temporarily blind or disorient its target with intense directed radiation. Targets can include sensors or human vision. Dazzlers emit infrared or invisible light against various electronic sensors, and visible light against humans, when they are intended to cause no long-term damage to eyes. The emitters are usually lasers, making what is termed a laser dazzler. Most of the contemporary systems are man-portable, and operate in either the red (a laser diode) or green (a diode-pumped solid-state laser, DPSS) areas of the electromagnetic spectrum.

Initially developed for military use, non-military products are becoming available for use in law enforcement and security.

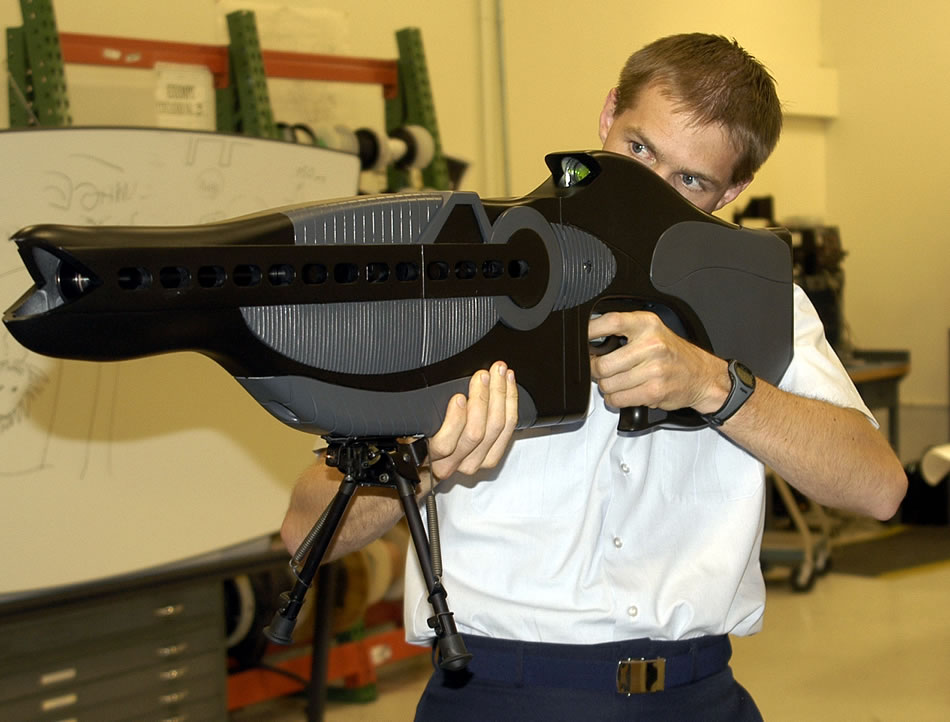
PHASR Rifle

The personnel halting and stimulation response rifle (PHASR) is a prototype non-lethal laser dazzler developed by the Air Force Research Laboratory's Directed Energy Directorate, U.S. Department of Defense. Its purpose is to temporarily disorient and blind a target. Blinding laser weapons have been tested in the past, but were banned under the 1995 United Nations Protocol on Blinding Laser Weapons, which the United States acceded to on 21 January 2009. The PHASR rifle, a low-intensity laser, is not prohibited under this regulation, as the blinding effect is intended to be temporary. It also uses a two-wavelength laser. The PHASR was tested at Kirtland Air Force Base, part of the Air Force Research Laboratory Directed Energy Directorate in New Mexico.

- ZM-87 is a Chinese blinding laser weapon.
- PY132A is a Chinese anti-drone dazzler.
- Soviet laser pistol was a prototype weapon designed for cosmonauts.
- Optical Dazzling Interdictor, Navy (AN/SEQ-4 ODIN) is a U.S. laser to be field tested in 2019 on an Arleigh Burke-class destroyer.

=== Operational use ===
On 19 November 2025, British Defence Secretary John Healey, stated that the Russian intelligence-gathering vessel Yantar had entered the United Kingdom’s wider waters north of Scotland during the previous weeks, and was allegedly engaging in espionage and the mapping of UK's undersea cables. In response, the UK deployed a Royal Navy frigate and RAF P-8 Poseidon maritime patrol aircraft to monitor and track the ship, during which Yantar reportedly directed dazzler system lasers at British pilots. Healey described the Russian actions as "deeply dangerous", noting that this was the second visit of Yantar to UK waters in the same year, and warning that Britain was prepared to respond if the vessel attempted to travel further south.

== Examples ==
Leading Western companies in the development of laser weapons have been Boeing, Northrop Grumman, Lockheed Martin, Netherlands Organisation for Applied Scientific Research, Rheinmetall and MBDA.

List of Directed Energy Weapons
Name	Description	Proposed power level	Year	Status	Citation
Project Excalibur	United States government nuclear weapons research program to develop a nuclear pumped x-ray laser as a directed energy weapon for ballistic missile defense.	Megawatts	1980s	Canceled	
Soviet laser pistol	First handheld laser weapon intended for use by cosmonauts in outer space. Used pyrotechnic flashbulb technology.	Handheld	1984	No longer used	
1K17 Szhatie	Experimental Soviet self-propelled laser weapon, with a 15-lenses high-powered solid-state laser emitter.		1990	Never went beyond the experimental stage	
17F19DM Polyus/Skif-DM	Soviet laser-armed orbital weapon that failed during deployment. Laser derived from the Beriev A-60.	1000kW	1987	Failed	
Terra-3	Soviet laser facility thought to be a powerful anti-satellite weapon prototype; later found to be a testing site with limited satellite tracking capabilities.	5kW; originally estimated to be up to 1MW	1979	Abandoned, partially disassembled	
US Army Missile Command laser	Ruggedized tunable laser emitting narrow-linewidth in the yellow-orange-red part of the spectrum.		1991	Never went beyond the experimental stage	
Boeing YAL-1	Airborne gas or chemical laser mounted in a modified Boeing 747, intended to shoot down incoming ballistic missiles over enemy territory.	1000kW	2000s	Canceled, scrapped	
Precision Airborne Standoff Directed Energy Weapon	Directed energy weapon project	100KW or more	2008	Canceled	
Laser Close-In Weapon System	Anti-aircraft laser unveiled at the Farnborough Airshow.		2010	Experimental	
ZEUS-HLONS (HMMWV Laser Ordnance Neutralization System)	First laser and energy weapon used on a battlefield for neutralizing mines and unexploded ordnance.	1kW	2002	Niche application	
Mid-Infrared Advanced Chemical Laser (MIRACL)	Experimental U.S. Navy deuterium fluoride laser tested against an Air Force satellite	1000kW	1997	Canceled	
Maritime Laser Demonstrator (MLD)	Laser for use aboard U.S. Navy warships, mounted on the former USS Paul F. Foster (in its role as the Self Defense Test Ship) and successfully tested in 2011 by sinking a small inflatable motorboat at a range of one mile in rough seas. Original tests used a 15kW laser, proposed to be scaled up to 100kW.	15-100kW	2011–2014	Active deployment	
Personnel Halting and Stimulation Response (PHaSR)	Non-lethal hand-held weapon developed by the United States Air Force's Directed Energy Directorate to "dazzle" or stun a target	Handheld	2005	Status unknown	
Tactical High Energy Laser (THEL)	Weaponized deuterium fluoride laser developed in a joint research project by Israel and the U.S. for shooting down aircraft and missiles		2000-2005	Discontinued	
Beriev A-60	Soviet/Russian CO_{2} gas laser mounted on an Ilyushin Il-76MD transport. Two units built, with one of them sporting the 1LK222 Sokol Eshelon laser system.	1000kW	1981-2016	Experimental	
High Energy Laser-Mobile Demonstrator (HEL-MD)	A laser system mounted on a Heavy Expanded Mobility Tactical Truck (HEMTT) designed by Boeing. Its current power level is 10 kW, which will be boosted to 50 kW, and expected to eventually be upgraded to 100 kW. Targets that can be engaged are mortar rounds, artillery shells and rockets, unmanned aerial vehicles, and cruise missiles.	10-100kW		Status unknown	
Fiber Laser developed by Lockheed Martin	A 60 kW fiber laser developed by Lockheed Martin to be mounted on the HEMTT that maintains beam quality at high power outputs while using less electricity than solid-state lasers.	60kW	2014	Status unknown	
Free-electron laser	FEL technology is being evaluated by the US Navy as a candidate for an antiaircraft and anti-missile directed-energy weapon. The Thomas Jefferson National Accelerator Facility's FEL has demonstrated over 14 kW power output. Compact multi-megawatt class FEL weapons are undergoing research.	14kW or more		Ongoing	
Portable Efficient Laser Testbed (PELT)	Directed energy weapon project, intended as an anti-riot less-lethal weapon			Status unknown	
Laser AirCraft CounterMeasures (ACCM)	Directed energy weapon project			Status unknown	
Mobile Expeditionary High-Energy Laser (MEHEL) 2.0	Experimental directed energy weapon integrated on Stryker 8x8 armored vehicle.			Experimental	
Advanced Test High Energy Asset (ATHENA)	Directed energy weapon project.			Status unknown	
Self-Protect High-Energy Laser Demonstrator (SHiELD)	Directed energy weapon project to protect aircraft from missiles.	50kW	2016	Cancelled	
Silent Hunter (laser weapon)	Chinese fiber-optic laser air-defense system. Described as being able to penetrate five 2 millimeter steel plates at a range of 800 meters and 5 millimeters of steel at 1,000 meters.	30kW or more	2017	Operational	
OW-A10	Chinese 10kw Mobile air-defense laser on Dongfeng Mengshi platform.	10KW	2021	In production	
OW-A50	Chinese 50kw Mobile air-defense laser on 8×8 heavy wheeled truck platform.	50KW	2021	In production	
LY-1	A Chinese high-energy laser weapon system developed for shipborne and ground-based deployment, designed to counter a wide range of aerial threats including unmanned aerial vehicles (UAVs), cruise missiles, helicopters, and fixed-wing aircraft	classified	2019	operational	
Russian Sokol Eshelon	Experimental airborne laser weapon developed by Russia, mounted on the Beriev A-60.			Experimental	
Russian Peresvet	Mobile air-defense laser undergoing service testing as close-range mobile ICBM escorts.			Undergoing service testing	
Raytheon laser	High-energy laser developed by Raytheon Company that can be mounted on a MRZR and used to disable an unmanned aerial system from approximately 1 mile away.			Status unknown	
ZKZM-500	Short-range antipersonnel less-lethal weapon that reportedly uses a laser to cause temporary blindness, skin burns, and pain. Existence disputed.			Status unknown	
Northrop Grumman electric laser	Electric laser capable of producing a 100-kilowatt ray of light, with potential to be mounted in aircraft, ship, or vehicle.	100kW	2009	Experimental	
Skyguard (area defense system)	Proposed area defense system.			Proposed	
Area Defense Anti-Munitions (ADAM)	Experimental fiber laser developed by Lockheed Martin. Tested at 10 kilowatts against rockets.	10kW		Ongoing development	
Almaz HEL	Russian truck-mounted directed energy weapon.			Status unknown	
Boeing Laser Avenger	Small anti-drone weapon mounted on an AN/TWQ-1 Avenger combat vehicle.	Tens of kW	2007	Experimental	
High Energy Liquid Laser Area Defense System (HELLADS)	Counter-RAM aircraft or truck-mounted laser under development by General Atomics under a DARPA contract. 150 kilowatt goal.	150kW	2004	Status unknown	
ARMOL	Turkish laser weapon that passed acceptance tests in 2019.		2019	Experimental	
AN/SEQ-3 Laser Weapon System (LaWS)	30 kW directed-energy weapon developed by the United States. Field tested on USS Ponce in 2014 and later moved to USS Portland (LPD-27) after Ponce was decommissioned. The AN/SEQ-3 development has been superseded by the HELIOS which also has better tracking of small drones.	30kW	2014	Fielded Prototype	
HELMA-P	2 kW anti-drone weapon for the French military designed by CILAS and Ariane Group with a range of up to one kilometre. Developed between 2017-2019, land trials were undertaken in 2020 and 2021 while 12–14 June 2023 it was trialled at sea aboard the French destroyer Forbin mounted inside a shipping container. The developer aims to increase its output to 5 kW.	2-5kW	2017	Prototype	
India's laser weapon	1 kW truck-mounted laser weapon tested by DRDO in August 2017 in Chitradurga ATR. Can create a hole in a metal sheet kept at a distance of 250 meters in 36 seconds.	1kW	2013	Technology demonstrator	
Integrated Drone Detection and Interdiction System	2 kW truck-mounted laser weapon developed by DRDO and operated by the Indian Army along Line of Control. Seven units in service, 9 more to be ordered. Range: 1 km	2kW	2015	Operational	
Integrated Drone Detection and Interdiction System Mk-II	Based on 10 kW Chemical Oxygen Iodine Laser (COIL) technology demonstrator. Range: 2 km. Indian Army and Air Force expected to order 16 systems.	10kW		Production	
DRDO Mk-II (A) DEW	30 kW truck-mounted laser weapon and utilises integral electro-optical fire-control system. Based on 10 kW Chemical Oxygen Iodine Laser (COIL) technology demonstrator. Range: 5 km against fixed-wing drones, helicopters, missiles.	30kW		Testing and Production	
DRDO Surya	300 kW laser weapon system Range: 20 km.	300kW		In development	
DragonFire	50 kW scalable laser directed-energy weapon in development by the United Kingdom intended for use against small boats, drones and artillery shells/missiles. Completed the first two of four planned service acceptance trials in 2022. Sea trials aboard a Type 23 frigate are due to begin in 2023 and run for two years. Land based vehicle mounted applications as a point defence system are also being considered.	50kW	2017	In development	
High Energy Laser with Integrated Optical-dazzler and Surveillance (HELIOS)	A 60 kW laser weapon system to be tested on an Arleigh Burke-class destroyer and intended for use against small boats and drones, future versions may also be powerful enough to target missiles or aircraft. Unlike the preceding LaWS which attempted to synchronise six separate fiber lasers into a single coherent beam the HELIOS has Spectral Beam Combination where several individual wavelengths of laser are overlapped on top of each other through a single fiber optic emitter. No longer relying on a burst of accumulated capacitor energy also grants a new capability for sustained low emission to dazzle a drone.	60kW	2021	Prototype	
Pulsed energy projectile (PEP)	A truck-mounted, riot control, less-lethal laser weapon designed for crowd control			Status unknown	
Technology Maturation Laser Weapon System Demonstrator (LWSD)	A laser weapon system installed on the USS Portland (LPD-27) that successfully destroyed a small unmanned aerial vehicle in May 2020		2020	Experimental	
Iron Beam	An Israeli laser weapon system for anti-rocket, anti-drone close range defense.	100kW	2025	In development	
Light Blade	An Israeli laser system deployed as part of the Iron Dome defense system to shoot down balloons		2020	In use	
Minotaur	Developed by Hellenic company Soukos Robotics, the SR-42 is a large anti-drone system consisting of radio jammer, microwave jammer, optical dazzler, 12.7mm gun and laser weapon mounted on a unmanned BTR 8×8 vehicle and was unveiled at the Defence Exhibition Athens (DEFEA) in July 2021. It is designed to hit drones every 2–3 seconds with 62 individual blue-violet lasers forming a combined output of 300 kW, its engagement range is 1 to 25 km, up to an altitude of 10 km. However to reduce thermal signature it is powered entirely by batteries with no onboard power generation giving a maximum engagement duration of 2 hours. The SR-32 is version of the same laser and microwave jammer mounted on a towed trailer, it has 26 lasers producing a combined output of 100 kW with a range of 1 to 10 Km and a ceiling of 1.7 Km	5kW each laser	2021	Experimental	
Cheongwang Block I Laser	South Korean Hanwha Aerospace 20-kW anti-drone system. Demonstrated in 2023, officially integrated into active service on October 4, 2024.	20kW	2024	In deployment	
10 kW-Class High-Power Laser EW Vehicle	Japanese 10-kW anti-drone system. Entered into service in November 2024.	10kW	2024	In deployment	
ODIN - Optical Dazzling Interdictor, Navy	Installed on 8 US Navy warships as of 2024 the ODIN uses a dazzling laser on incoming drone and missile sensors and cameras to confuse them so that they cannot guide correctly or find their target. While primarily designed for uncrewed flying objects, the system could also be used on crewed vehicles to cause glare in a pilot’s vision.	Tens of kW	2020	in deployment	
Locust Laser Weapon System (LWS)	Developed by AeroVironment for the United States Army, and United States Marine Corps's Joint Light Tactical Vehicle (JLTV), and M1301 infantry squad vehicle (ISV) to act as point-defense against incoming drone and aerial threats.	20-35 kW	2026	Experimental	

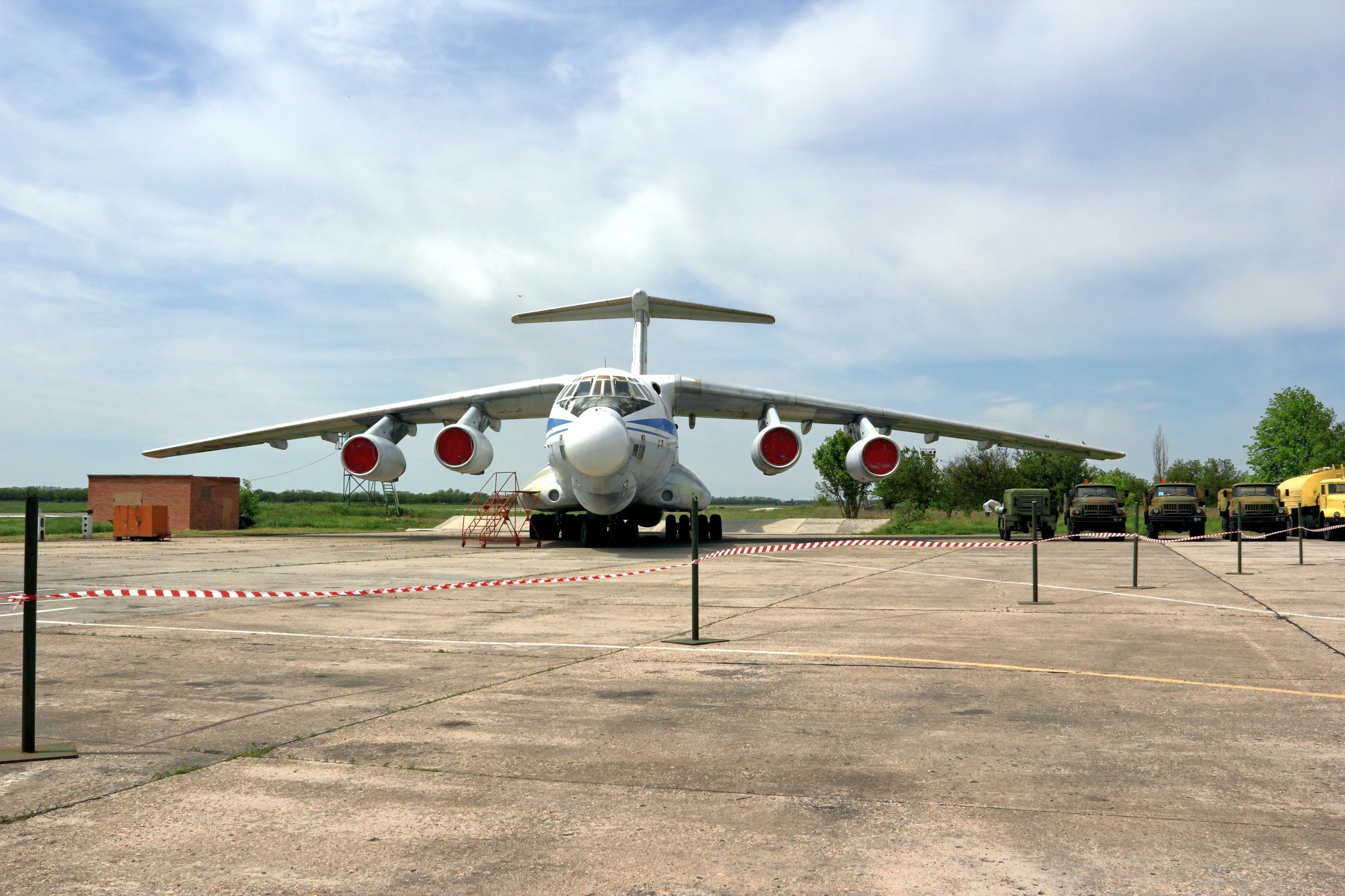
The Beriev A-60 is still experimenting with the Sokol Eshelon laser as an intended anti-satellite weapon.

Most of these projects have been canceled, discontinued, never went beyond the prototype or experimental stage, or are only used in niche applications like dazzling, blinding, mine clearance or close defense against small, unprotected targets. Effective, high performance laser weapons seem to be difficult to achieve using current or near-future technology.

== Problems ==
Laser beams begin to cause plasma breakdown in the atmosphere at energy densities of around one megajoule per cubic centimeter. This effect, called "blooming," causes the laser to defocus and disperse energy into the surrounding air. Blooming can be more severe if there is fog, smoke, dust, rain, snow, smog, or foam in the air.

Techniques that may reduce these effects include:

- Spreading the beam across a large, curved mirror that focuses the power on the target, to keep energy density en route too low for blooming to happen. This requires a large, very precise, fragile mirror, mounted somewhat like a searchlight, requiring bulky machinery to slew the mirror to aim the laser.
- Using a phased array. For typical laser wavelengths, this method would require billions of micrometer-size antennae. There is currently no known way to implement these, though carbon nanotubes have been proposed. Phased arrays could theoretically also perform phase-conjugate amplification (see below). Phased arrays do not require mirrors or lenses, and can be made flat and thus do not require a turret-like system (as in "spread beam") to be aimed, though range will suffer if the target is at extreme angles to the surface of the phased array.
- Using a phase-conjugate laser system. This method employs a "finder" or "guide" laser illuminating the target. Any mirror-like ("specular") points on the target reflect light that is sensed by the weapon's primary amplifier. The weapon then amplifies inverted waves, in a positive feedback loop, destroying the target, with shockwaves as the specular regions evaporate. This avoids blooming because the waves from the target pass through the blooming, and therefore show the most conductive optical path; this automatically corrects for the distortions caused by blooming. Experimental systems using this method usually use special chemicals to form a "phase-conjugate mirror". In most systems, however, the mirror overheats dramatically at weapon-useful power levels.
- Using a very short pulse that finishes before blooming interferes, but this requires a very high power laser to concentrate large amounts of energy in that pulse which does not exist in a weaponized or easily weaponizable form. (Note: as of January 2020)
- Focusing multiple lasers of relatively low power on a single target. This is increasingly bulky as the total power of the system increases.

== Countermeasures ==
Essentially, a laser generates a beam of light which will be delayed or stopped by any opaque medium and perturbed by any translucent or less than perfectly transparent medium just like any other type of light. A simple, dense smoke screen can and will often block a laser beam. Infrared or multi-spectrum smoke grenades or generators will also disturb or block infrared laser beams. Any opaque case, cowling, bodywork, fuselage, hull, wall, shield or armor will absorb at least the "first impact" of a laser weapon, so the beam must be sustained to achieve penetration.

The Chinese People's Liberation Army has invested in the development of specialized coatings that can deflect beams fired by U.S. military lasers. Laser light can be deflected, reflected, or absorbed by manipulating physical and chemical properties of materials. Artificial coatings can counter certain specific types of lasers, but a different type of laser may match the coating's absorption spectrum enough to transfer damaging amounts of energy. The coatings are made of several different substances, including low-cost metals, rare earths, carbon fiber, silver, and diamonds that have been processed to fine sheens and tailored against specific laser weapons. China is developing anti-laser defenses because protection against them is considered far cheaper than creating competing laser weapons.

Dielectric mirrors, inexpensive ablative coatings, thermal transport delay, and obscurants are also being studied as countermeasures. In not a few operational situations, even simple, passive countermeasures like rapid rotation (which spreads the heat and does not allow a fixed targeting point except in strictly frontal engagements), higher acceleration (which increases the distance and changes the angle quickly), or agile maneuvering during the terminal attack phase (which hampers the ability to target a vulnerable point, forces a constant re-aiming or tracking with close to zero lag, and allows for some cooling) can defeat or help to defeat non-highly pulsed, high-energy laser weapons.

== In popular culture ==
Arthur C. Clarke envisaged particle beam weapons in his 1955 novel Earthlight, in which energy would be delivered by high-velocity beams of matter. After the invention of the laser in 1960, it briefly became the death ray of choice for science fiction writers. By the late 1960s and 1970s, as the laser's limits as a weapon became evident, the ray gun began to be replaced by similar weapons with names that better reflected the destructive capabilities of the device, such as the blaster in Star Wars or phasers in Star Trek, which were originally lasers.

== See also ==
- Directed-energy weapon
- Laser sight
- Space weapon
- Weapons in science fiction
- 2026 Texas and New Mexico airspace closures – sudden closures of US airspace reportedly prompted by anti-drone laser weapon use
