= Zeus-HLONS =

Solid-state laser weapon

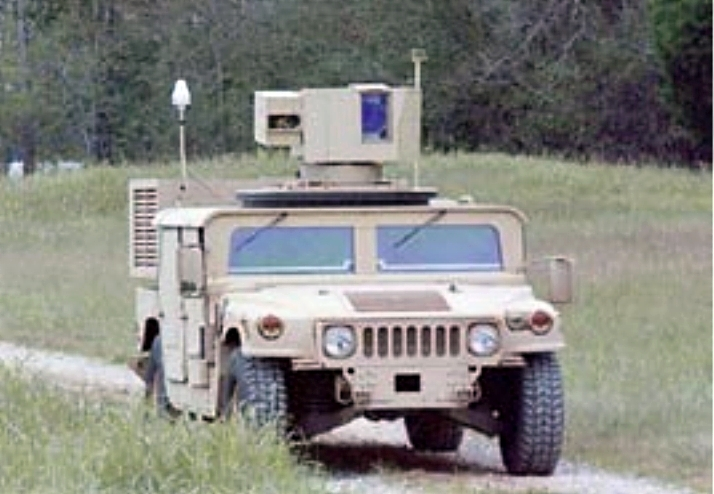
Zeus-HLONS

The Zeus-HLONS (Zeus-High Mobility Multi-purpose Wheeled Vehicle), also known as HMMWV, Laser Ordnance Neutralization System, is a solid-state laser weapon which is used by the U.S. military in order to neutralize surface land mines and unexploded ordnance. The Zeus-HLONS system was a co-operative effort between SPARTA, Inc. and Naval EOD Technology Division to demonstrate that a moderate-power commercial solid state laser (SSL) and beam control system could be integrated onto a Humvee and used to clear surface mines, improvised explosive devices (IEDs), or unexploded ordnance from supply routes and minefields.

== Features ==
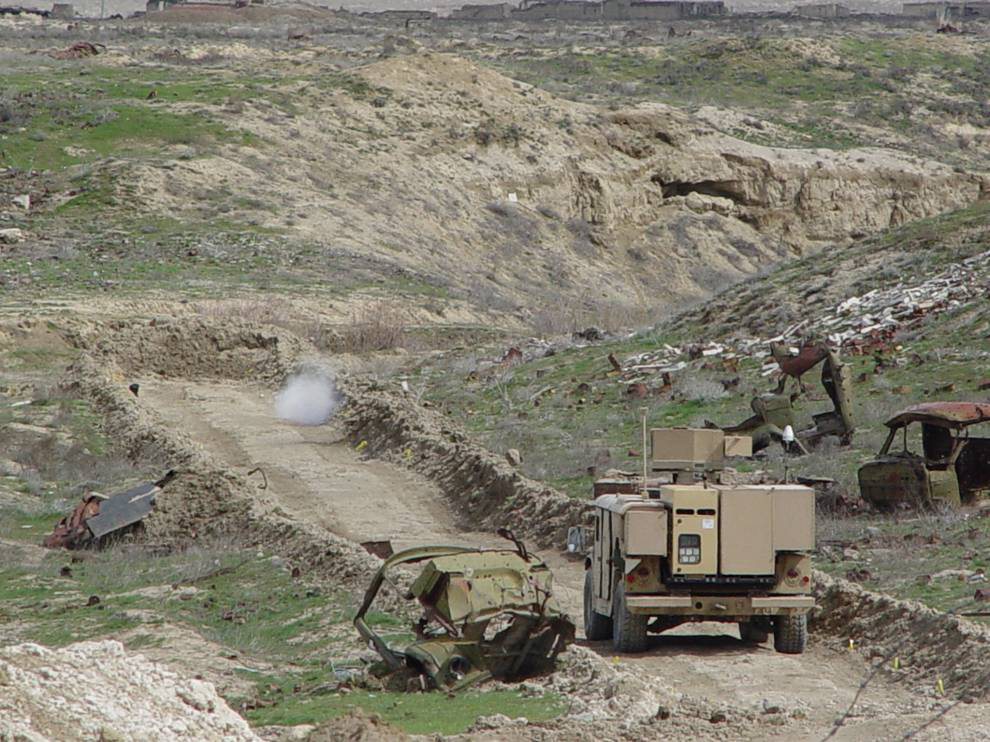
Zeus-HLONS engaging unexploded ordnance

Zeus uses a 10 kW solid-state heat capacity (SSHC) laser beam to heat target ordnance to the point of causing the explosive filler to ignite and start to burn. Therefore, it does not depend on the type of fuze the specific ordnance uses. The resulting neutralization produces a low-level explosion that minimizes collateral damage.

It has demonstrated the capability to engage targets at distances from 25 to 300 meters, provided they are within line of sight. The Zeus system can be fired up to 2,000 times per day.

The Zeus-HLONS system offers a roll-on roll-off capability that is C-17 and C-130 transportable. It is also helicopter sling certified.

== History ==
=== Development ===
The two main people behind the project are Gerald Wilson (Directed Energy division of the U.S. Army Space and Missile Defense Command (SMDC)) and Owen Hofer (U.S. engineering firm SPARTA), which designed and built the system.

Prior to the Zeus-HLONS system, Explosive Ordnance Disposal (EOD) personnel had to approach such munitions—either manually or using a robotic platform—place an explosive charge nearby, and then detonate it to destroy the munition, a method that is still used until laser neutralization systems become widespread. Using Zeus is both cheaper (costing only a few cents per laser shot) and safer than the traditional approach.

Lasers were theoretically evaluated for use in causing detonations of explosives in 1986 and laboratory demonstrations were done in 1987 with a 30 kW CO_{2} laser.

By 1991 demonstrations were done on landmines using a 0.3 kW Nd:YAG laser and 0.8 kW CO_{2} laser.

The concept of laser neutralization of ordnance was demonstrated in 1994 with the design, development and live field testing of the Mobile Ordnance Disrupter System (MODS). MODS used an M113A2 armored personnel carrier that supported an 1100 watt arc lamp-pumped laser system. The program was funded by the U.S. Air Force at Eglin Air Force Base (Florida). This was then moved to fitting the system into a Humvee.

Zeus is therefore the 2nd generation of this concept. Its development started in 1996 and was still undergoing upgrades and military demonstrations at the High Energy Laser Systems Test Facility (HELSTF) at White Sands Missile Range, New Mexico, in 2002 when it was requested to be deployed to Afghanistan (in December 2002 by General John M. Keane, Vice Chief of Staff of the Army 1999-2003).

In early 2004 the system was upgraded to a 1-kilowatt laser and then by late 2004 to a 2-kilowatt Yb:glass fibre-laser that is diode-pumped and operates in quasi-CW mode. This significantly reduced the overall system weight (removing about 2,000 pounds) and provided increased output beam power, which equates to extended range.

In January 2005, at the IQPC's Directed Energy Weapons conference in London, Gerald Wilson said the system takes between 5 seconds and 4 minutes (typically 30 seconds) to destroy a mine, resulting in a clearance rate of up to 25 explosives per hour when equipped with a 0.5 kW laser.

=== Deployment ===
Over its test and deployment history, Zeus has eliminated more than 1,600 ordnance items of 40 different types with more than a 98% success rate.

In March 2003, Zeus was deployed to Afghanistan for 6 months to demonstrate its counter-mine capabilities in a combat environment (Operation Enduring Freedom). It was used at Bagram Air Base and neutralized more than 200 munitions (including 51 in one 100 minute period) of 10 different types. At the time, the Zeus-HLONS system was a 1/2 kilowatt laser.

On March 16, 2005, Zeus was deployed to Iraq to assist in explosive ordnance disposal activities there as part of a three-vehicle convoy protection concept. The Zeus laser was tested and used in Iraq along MSR Tampa by a team of EOD soldiers from the 319th Ord Co (EOD), Tacoma, Washington in February and March 2005. The HLONS(Zeus) was added into the Hunter/Killer Project in an attempt to integrate EOD and Engineer resources. The project illustrated the shortcomings of the system with Counter IED (C-IED) operations. Chief among the limitations of the system was the inability to penetrate concealment materials to heat the explosives inside the ordnance, and the tendency of non EOD personnel to utilize the HLONS on all ordnance even if doing so created a more dangerous situation.

It has been used in Iraq by the U.S. military, in the first battlefield use of any laser weapon.

== See also ==
- Directed-energy weapon
- Tactical High Energy Laser
- Airborne Laser
- ALKA
- Strategic Defense Initiative
- Boeing Laser Avenger
- List of laser articles
