= Locust Laser Weapon System =

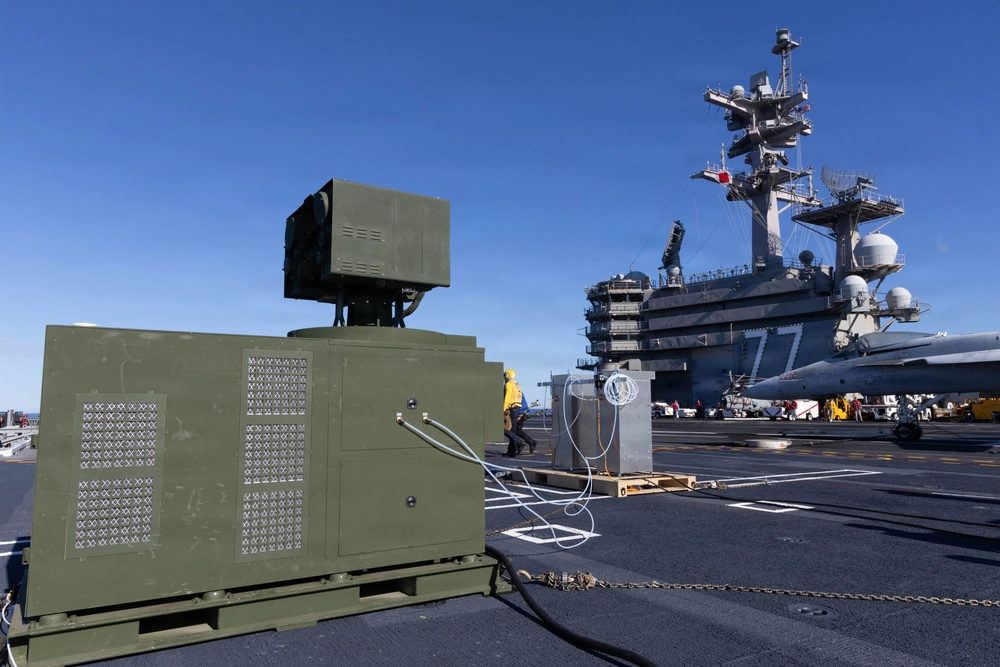
- The Locust Laser Weapon System tested on George H.W. Bush
- Type: Laser weapon
- Place of origin: United States

Service history
- In service: 2025–present
- Used by: United States Army; United States Marine Corps

Production history
- Designer: AeroVironment
- Designed: 2023–2025
- Manufacturer: AeroVironment

The LOCUST Laser Weapon System (LWS) or Modular Laser Directed Energy Weapon System, is a directed-energy weapon developed by AeroVironment to serve as a counter-unmanned aerial system (C-UAS) which utilizes artificial intelligence to intercept unmanned aerial vehicle (UAVs). On December 18, 2025, AeroVironment had delivered the first two Joint Light Tactical Vehicle (JLTV)-mounted LOCUST LWSs to the U.S. Army for the Army Multi-Purpose High Energy Laser (AMP-HEL) prototyping effort to create directed energy lasers that can counter UAVs.

== Purpose ==
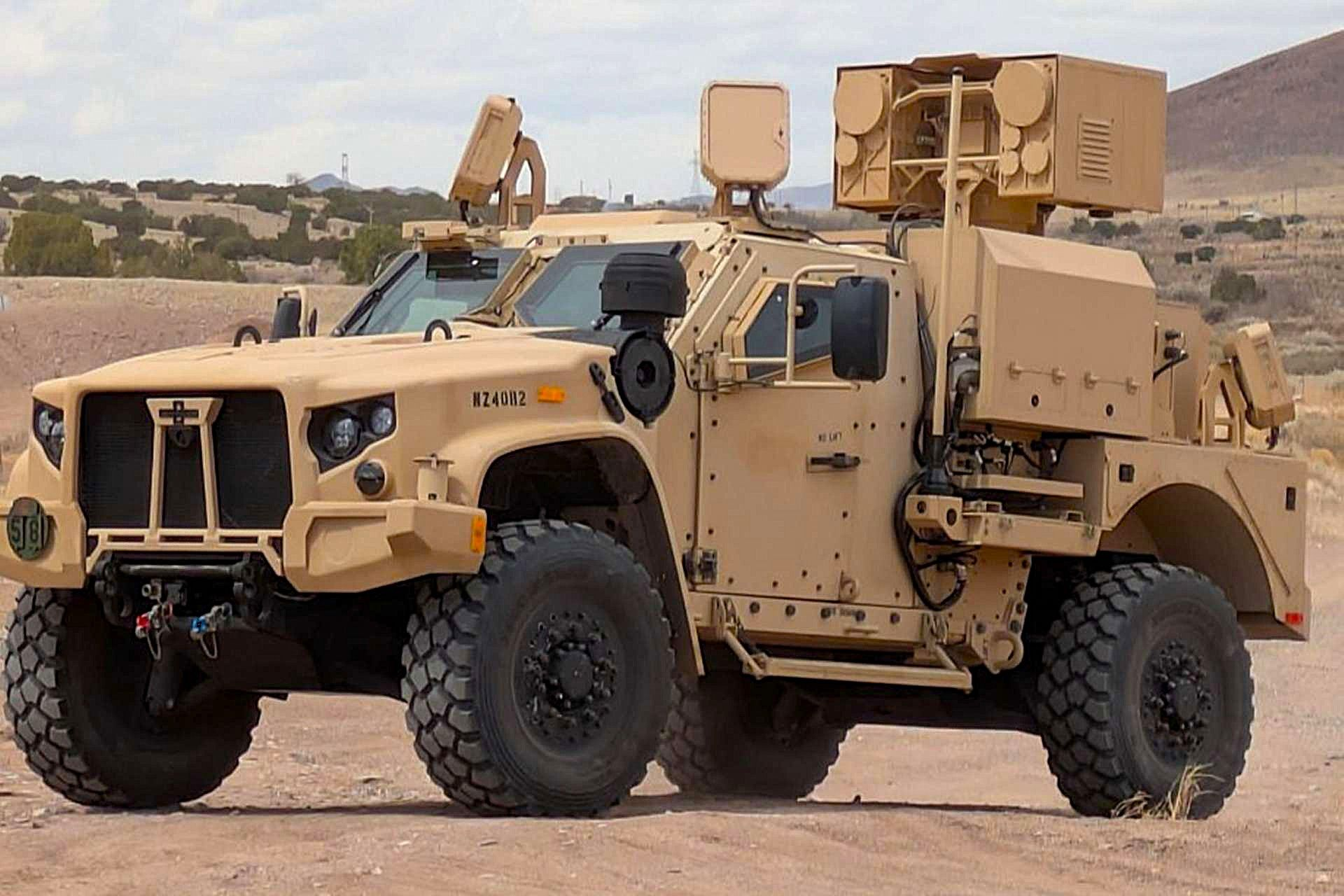
JLTV-mounted LOCUST high-energy laser systems

The LWS uses a MOSA-based modular configuration to be able to be modified to suite specific mission needs. It uses 20-35+ kW of power, with the ability to scale.

Designed for the U.S. Army's JLTV, and M1301 infantry squad vehicle (ISV) and other defensive needs, LWS offers a hard-kill option for incoming UAV threats.

== History ==
AeroVironment was given a contract by the U.S. Navy's Naval Surface Warfare Center during 2023 to create a prototype for a directed energy weapon for the U.S. Marine Corps' JLTV; this turned into the LWS.

The LWS had been tested on board the USS George H. W. Bush as part of a live-fire test. During the live-fire, the LWS successfully detected, engaged, and destroyed multiple unmanned aerial vehicles.

In August 2026, the system was used to disable UAVs along the US-Mexico border.

== See also ==
- AN/SEQ-3 Laser Weapon System
- High Energy Laser with Integrated Optical-dazzler and Surveillance
