= Integrated Drone Detection & Interdiction System =

Laser-based weapon system developed in India

Integrated Drone Detection & Interdiction System (IDD&IS)
- Type: Laser weapon
- Place of origin: India

Service history
- In service: 2024–present
- Used by: Corps of Army Air Defence

Production history
- Designer: Defence Research and Development Organisation
- Designed: 2012–present
- Manufacturer: Bharat Electronics; Adani Defence & Aerospace; Larsen & Toubro (Mk-II)

The Integrated Drone Detection & Interdiction System (IDD&IS) is a series of laser weapons being developed by the Defence Research and Development Organisation for the Indian Armed Forces.

== Development ==
A 2012 research paper had paved the way for the development of an indigenous laser weapon in India. The requirement of a similar system was mentioned in the defence ministry's 2013 Technology Perspective & Capability Roadmap and the government had confirmed that the research on the matter had commenced at the Centre for High Energy Systems and Sciences (CHESS), and Laser Science and Technology Centre (LASTEC).

By 2015, LASTEC completed the development of a unit of 1 kW 'single mode fibre laser' and was engaged in the further development of 5 kW and 9 kW fibre laser sources.

Towards the end of August 2017, India conducted its first successful test of a directed-energy weapon. The weapon was a 1 kW class laser weapon in a truck-mounted configuration from the Chitradurga Aeronautical Test Range in Karnataka. In the test witnessed by the then defence minister, Arun Jaitley, the laser beam hit its target at a distance of 250 m (820 ft) and it took 36 seconds to "make a hole into the metal sheet". The weapon was a technology demonstrator and was to be followed by a 2 kW laser weapon with an expected range of 1 km (0.62 mi). Meanwhile, the core of the weapon system, the laser source, was being imported from Germany. By then, LASTEC had also developed a 10 kW chemical oxygen iodine laser and was developing a 30–100 kW "gas dynamic high power laser-based DEW" under Project Aditya.

As of May 2024, DRDO was developing laser-DEW systems of a 30–50 kW range under its short, medium and long-term goals.

On 13 April 2025, DRDO successfully conducted the trials of the truck-mounted Mk-II(A) laser-DEW system, India's first high-power laser weapon. During the trials, the system engaged a fixed-wing drone at long range as well as deterred a seven-drone swarm attack and destroyed enemy surveillance sensors and antennae. The system demonstrated a high speed of engagement, accuracy and destroyed the target in seconds. The cost to engage for a few seconds was equivalent to the cost of few litres of petrol. The system can engage its target once detected by a radar or its integral EO system. The CHESS-developed system was tested at the National Open Air Range, Kurnool, Andhra Pradesh for a range of 3.5 km in hot, extreme weather conditions. User trials would reportedly take 1–1.5 years. It is codenamed Sahastra Shakti and is powered by 6 individual 5 kW laser sources in a 2×3 configuration. During April 2025, DRDO was also developing laser-DEW systems of a 50–100 kW range along with microwave-based DEW under its revised short, medium and long-term goals.

A 5 kW laser DEW was tested as part of the Integrated Air Defence Weapon System on 23 August 2025.

On 22 December 2025, Apollo Microsystems received technology transfer for CHESS 10 kW Laser DEW system and IRDE EO tracking system.

The Indian Army released a request for information for the acquisition of an IDD&IS Mark IIA in February 2026. The weapon's requirement was laid out by the Directorate General of Army Air Defence, and it is supposed be integrated with the existing air defence weapons.

As of 20 September, the first-of-production model (FOPM) of the 30 kW-class directed-energy weapon is expected to be developed within one year. Thereafter, further trials would be conducted to determine the range and other desired parameters from the user. DRDO is also expected to issue an expression of interest for the Indian industry to find a production partner for the system. Production partner agreements for earlier variants were signed with Bharat Electronics, Adani Defence & Aerospace and Larsen & Toubro (Mk-IIA). L&T has already developed the FOPM of the Mk-II which will now undergo trials.

== Variants ==
- IDD&IS Mk-I: 2 kW laser source with a hard kill range of 0.8–1 km (0.50–0.62 mi) and soft kill range of 2–5 km (1.2–3.1 mi) by jamming. Detection range: 5–8 km (3.1–5.0 mi). Deployed by the Indian Army.
- IDD&IS Mk-II: 10 kW laser source with a range of 2 km (1.2 mi). Cleared for induction by the defence ministry.
- IDD&IS Mk-IIA: Also called, Mk-II (A) Laser-DEW or Sahastra Shakti, it is a 30 kW class laser weapon powered by 6 individual 5 kW laser sources in a 2×3 configuration. It has a range of 5 km (3.1 mi) integrated with 360° EO/IR sensors and electronic warfare capability. Effective against fixed-wing aircraft, swarm drones as well as missiles. In production.
- DRDO Surya: 300 kW laser source with a range of 20 km (12 mi).

== Service history ==
The Ministry of Defense released a request for proposal in November 2022 to purchase nine IDD&IS units. In March 2024, the Indian Army's Corps of Army Air Defence had inducted the first lot of seven IDD&IS into service. India has reportedly placed an order for 23 such systems for ₹400 crore (equivalent to ₹426 crore or US$46 million in 2026).

On 13 April 2025, it was reported that the Indian Army's IDD&IS Mk 1 had intercepted a Chinese origin, Pakistan Army-operated drone in the area of responsibility of the XVI Corps, southwards of the Pir Panjal Range. The Army also planned to procure nine additional units under emergency procurement. Bharat Electronics, and the Corps of Army Air Defence signed an agreement for the IDD&IS on 16 May 2025, as part of a larger ₹572 crore (equivalent to ₹591 crore or US$63 million in 2026) contract.

On 29 December 2025, the Defence Acquisition Council, functioning under the Ministry of Defence and the chairmanship of the defence minister, Rajnath Singh, cleared the procurement of 10 to 12 units of IDD&IS Mk-II for the Indian Army. Earlier, reports in November 2025, indicated Indian Army and Indian Air Force's bid to initially induct 16 IDD&IS Mk-II systems.

== Related development ==
In early September 2024, it was reported that the Indian Navy conducted trials of a 2 kW DEW from a naval warship. Similar trials of a 10 kW DEW was planned. During April 2025, DRDO was also developing a microwave-based DEW under its revised short, medium and long-term goals.

In 2026, DRDO was working on the development of a helicopter-borne laser weapon pod for counter unmanned air system operations to be used on HAL Dhruv and HAL Rudra. The laser-based directed-energy weapon is being developed by CHESS, while the stabilised gimballed pod for the sensors is being developed by the IRDE. The 180 kg (400 lb) pod will feature a thermal imager, a day camera and an eye-safe laser rangefinder. The range to detect and track micro drone-class targets would be 5 km (3.1 mi), while that of the laser beam would be 2 km (1.2 mi). The development commenced with industrial partners with the challenge of keeping the beam locked on small targets from a manoeuvering helicopter. The CHESS laser would be integrated with a helicopter within two years, followed by flight-safety trials and airworthiness certification by the CEMILAC with project completion expected by 2029-end.

== Operators ==
- India
  - Indian Army: 7 Mk-I in service, 9 Mk-I to be ordered.

== See also ==
=== Related development ===
- Bhargavastra (counter drone system)
- DRDO High-Power Microwave system
- DRDO BEDHAK system

=== Other laser weapns ===
- HELIOS – (United States)
- DragonFire – (United Kingdom)
- Iron Beam – (Israel)
- LY-1 – (China)
