= OW5 =

Chinese laser weapon

- Type: Directed-energy weapon
- Place of origin: China

The OW5 is a Chinese ground-based high-energy laser weapon designed to intercept low-attitude, slow-moving targets.

== History ==
The system was officially unveiled at the 2025 China Victory Day Parade as part of the People's Liberation Army's anti-drone air defense system, but the vehicle was spotted earlier in transit on highways in June 2025.

== Variants ==
The export versions of the system, including variants such as OW5-A10, OW5-A30, and OW5-A50, were promoted by the China North Industries Group Corporation (Norinco) in 2021.

The variant designation denotes the laser's rated power—the OW5-A50 is rated at 50-kilowatt

The particular version unveiled in September 2025 was the OW5-A10 variant, which fires a 10-kilowatt laser and is mounted on a Dongfeng Mengshi platform, and the OW5-A50, which is mounted on 8×8 heavy wheeled truck chassis.

== See also ==
- LY-1
- High Energy Laser with Integrated Optical-dazzler and Surveillance
- DragonFire (weapon)
- AN/SEQ-3 Laser Weapon System
- Iron Beam
