= LY-1 =

Chinese laser weapon

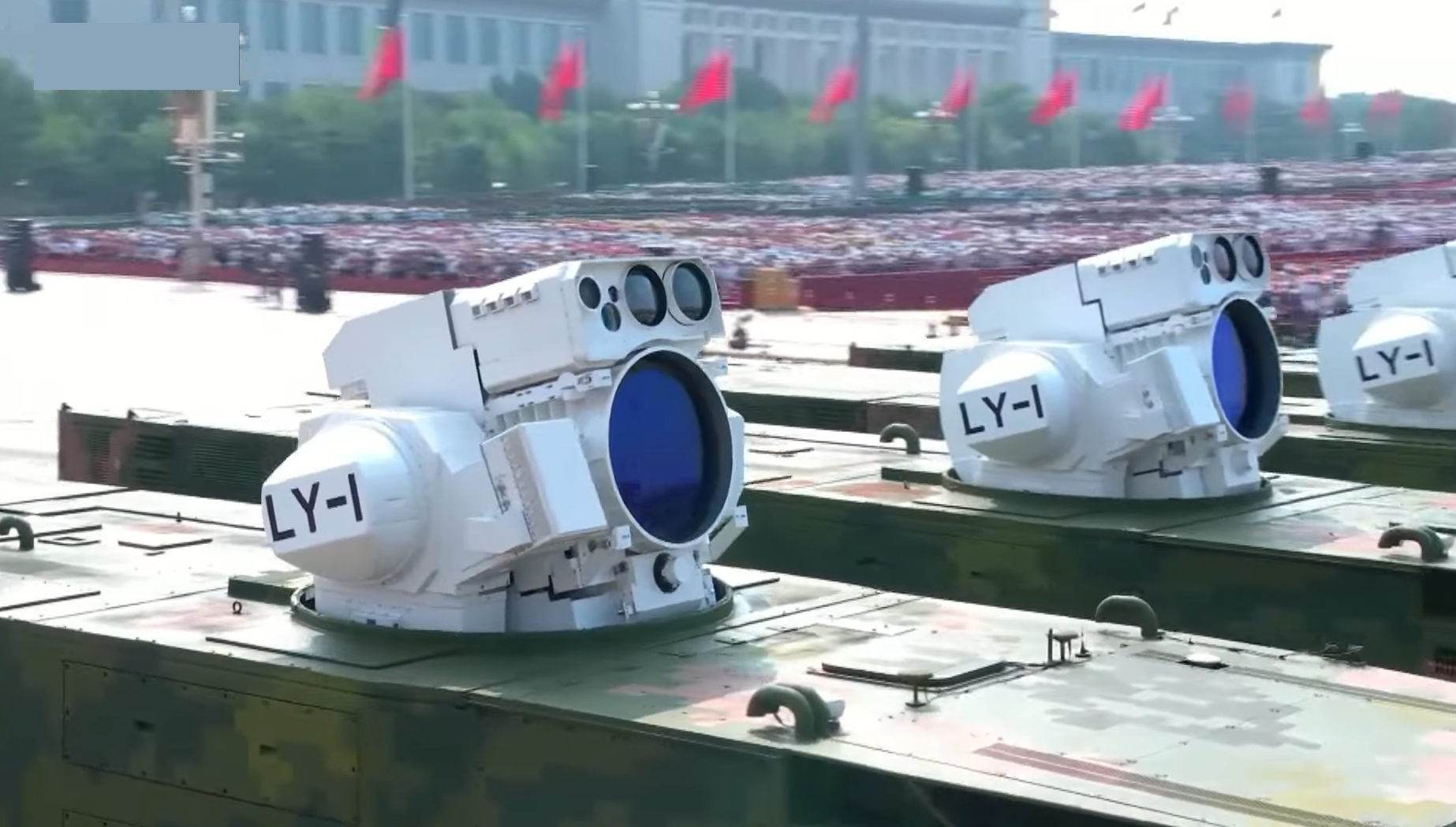
- LY-1 at the 2025 China Victory Day Parade
- Type: Directed-energy weapon
- Place of origin: China

The LY-1 (Chinese: 燎原-1; pinyin: liaoyuan-1; lit. 'prairie fire 1') is a Chinese shipborne or ground-based high-energy laser weapon designed to intercept drones, cruise missiles, helicopters, and fixed-wing aircraft. The laser weapon system was unveiled at the 2025 China Victory Day Parade. A very similar system was tested on a Type 071 amphibious transport dock of the People's Liberation Army Navy (PLAN) in 2024, with the earliest report of such a system under development in 2019. As a shipborne weapon, the LY-1 could form a layered air defense system with missiles such as HQ-10 and HQ-16. Since September 2025, Pakistan Navy have shown interest in the system for a potential acquisition.

== See also ==
- OW5
- High Energy Laser with Integrated Optical-dazzler and Surveillance
- DragonFire (weapon)
- AN/SEQ-3 Laser Weapon System
- Iron Beam
- Silent Hunter (laser weapon)
- Integrated Drone Detection & Interdiction System
