= Optical Dazzling Interdictor, Navy =

Dazzler directed-energy laser system

Optical Dazzling Interdictor, Navy (ODIN)
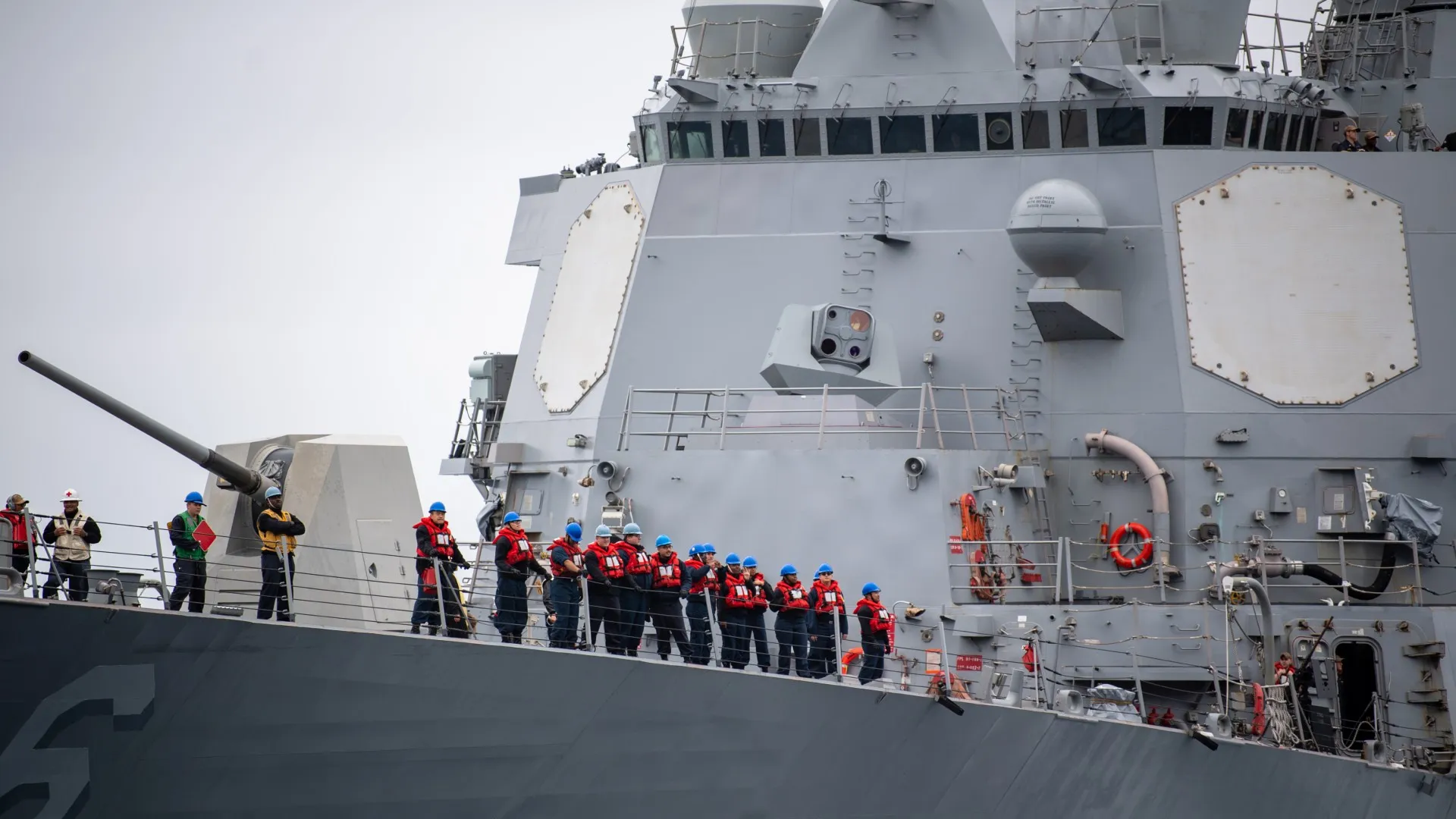
- USS Stockdale (DDG-106) equipped with the ODIN system
- Type: Laser weapon
- Place of origin: United States

Service history
- In service: 2019–present
- Used by: United States Navy

Production history
- Designer: Northrop Grumman
- Designed: 2018–2019
- Manufacturer: Northrop Grumman

The Optical Dazzling Interdictor, Navy (ODIN), is a directed-energy weapon developed by Northrop Grumman designed to intercept fast-attack craft, aircraft and UAVs, and anti-ship missiles. It was first installed onto the USS Dewey.

== Purpose ==
The ODIN is a dazzler directed-energy weapon which uses a dazzling laser on missiles and drone sensors and cameras in order to confuse them making it unable to find their target or guide correctly.

== Characteristics ==
The ODIN is a "bolt-on" capable weapon that only has the option of dazzling and deterring optical sensors rather than hard-kill an incoming threat, something the High Energy Laser with Integrated Optical-dazzler and Surveillance (HELIOS) can do.

== History ==
The ODIN first saw operational service on Dewey. With the ODIN being field tested during late 2019. Several more destroyers had received the ODIN totaling to 8 Arleigh Burke-class destroyer deployed with the weapon system. (Note: As of 2023, Optical Dazzling Interdictor, Navy (ODIN) is deployed on DDG-100, DDG-104, DDG-105, DDG-106, DDG-111, and DDG-113.)

The ODIN completed its first operational training cycle at the Directed Energy Systems Integration Laboratory (DESIL) at Naval Base Ventura County. The operational training cycle allowed for a new training and operator certification framework for directed-energy weapons that are deployed on naval ships.

=== Deployment ===
==== 2024 ====
The first combat deployment seen by the ODIN weapon system was during the Red Sea crisis, where the USS Spruance had been attacked by roughly two dozen missiles and drones launched by Iranian-backed Houthi rebels in Yemen while transiting the Red Sea along with the Freedom-class littoral combat ship USS Indianapolis. The missiles and drones had been intercepted or missed their target. Despite deployment, there are no confirmed reports of it being used during combat operations.

==== 2026 ====
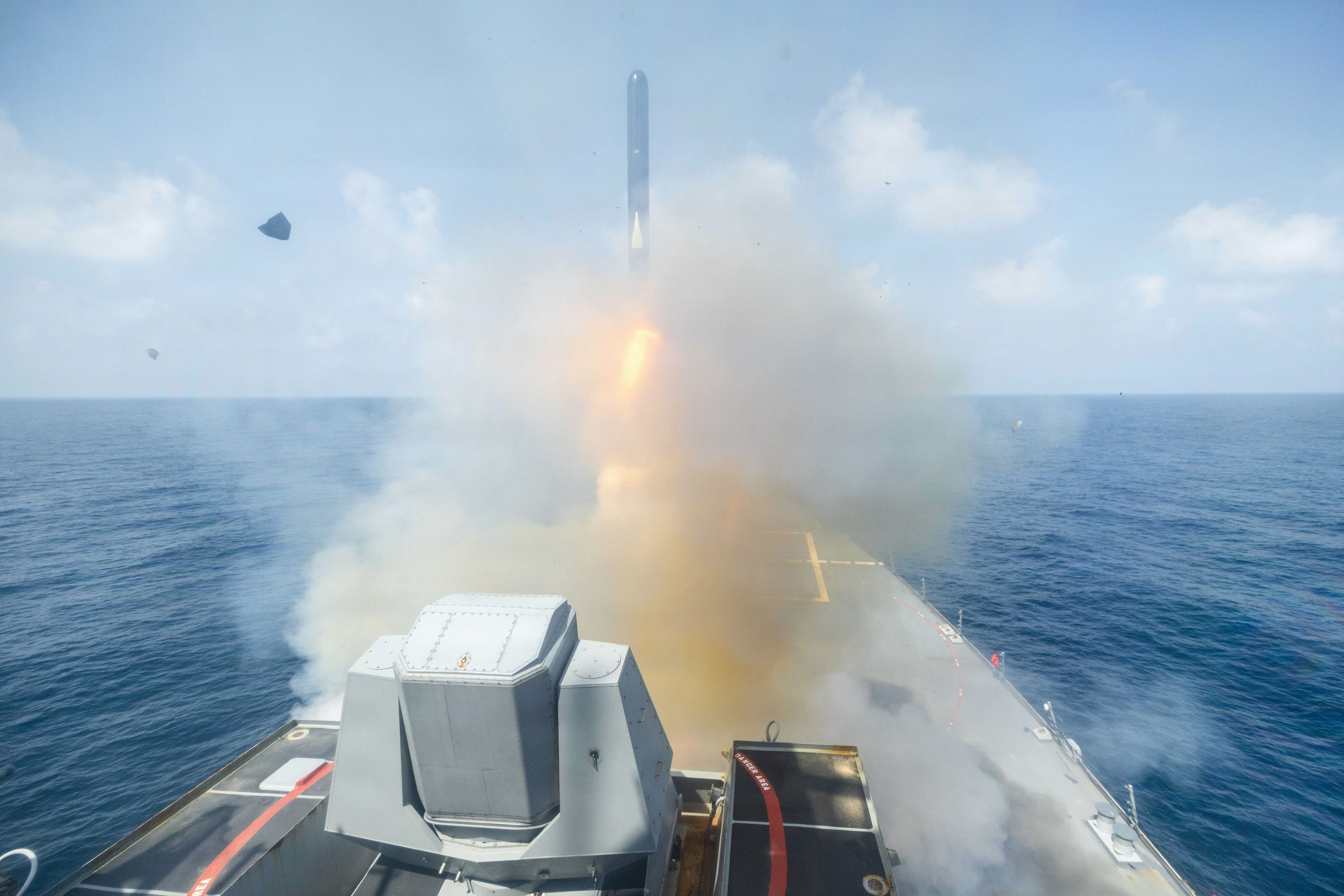
Spruance with the ODIN weapon system during Operation Epic Fury.

During Operation Epic Fury, multiple destroyers equipped with the ODIN had been deployed in the Arabian Sea making the second combat zone seen by the ODIN.

== See also ==
- AN/SEQ-3 Laser Weapon System
- High Energy Laser with Integrated Optical-dazzler and Surveillance
