= Silent Hunter =

Silent Hunter may refer to:

- Silent Hunter (video game)
- Silent Hunter (laser weapon)
