= Bhargavastra =

Counter unmanned air systems

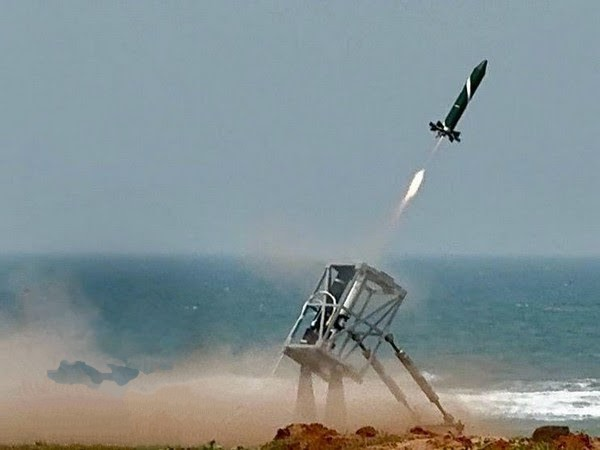
- Bhargavastra during user trials
- Type: Anti-UAV Defence System; Counter unmanned air systems
- Place of origin: India

Production history
- Designer: Solar Defence and Aerospace Limited
- Designed: 2025
- Manufacturer: System: Solar Defence and Aerospace Limited; Rocket/Munition: Economic Explosives Limited

Specifications
- Mass: 2.5 kg (5.5 lb)
- Detonation mechanism: Hit-to-kill
- Engine: Solid-propellant rocket
- Propellant: Solid fuel
- Operational range: Detection: 6-10 km (>5 km for 0.01m² object); Interception: 2.5 km
- Guidance system: IIR/CCD
- Launch platform: Road mobile (7.5-ton class all-terrain vehicle), Naval Platforms

Bhargavastra is a multi-layer micro-missile Anti-Drone/Counter-Unmanned Aerial System (C-UAS) designed and developed by the Indian private sector company Solar Defence and Aerospace Limited. Bhargavastra counter-drone system is based on small lightweight guided and unguided micro-missiles and micro-rockets which are specially developed to tackle threats from loitering munitions and weaponized autonomous swarm drones which cannot be jammed or spoofed. This is the first guided micro-missile counter-drone system of its sort in the world. The technology is intended to stop drone strikes at a lower cost than surface-to-air missiles.

With an engagement range of up to 2.5 kilometers, the first layer uses unguided micro-rockets that can destroy drone swarms within a 20-meter radius. The guided micro-missiles with high precision makes up the second layer for evasive or high-value aerial targets.

== History ==
The Bhargavastra counter-drone system was developed by the Solar Defence and Aerospace Limited, a subsidiary of the Solar Group in response to the increasing dangers that the Indian Army faces from weaponized drones and loitering munitions. The project began after analyzing the Russian invasion of Ukraine, which involved the use of loitering munition and swarm drones, and the Nagorno-Karabakh conflict between Azerbaijan and Armenia. The Bhargavastra counter-drone system was developed without the Indian Armed Forces issuing a formal request for proposals. Solar Group developed the counter-drone technology on its own initiative, and after research and testing are over, it will be made available to the military. The company intends to export the system overseas.

According to Solar Defence and Aerospace, every part—from strike mechanisms to detecting sensors—is developed in India. Multiple sensor systems, such as radar, electro-optical, and radio frequency receivers, can be integrated thanks to the open architecture, allowing for layered air defense cover that is customized to meet the needs of individual missions. A coordinated, multi-layered approach to combating airborne threats is provided by the Bhargavastra counter-drone system.

== Development ==
The Bhargavastra system employs a multi-layer counter-drone defense with inexpensive micro-rockets and micro-missiles for hard kill. The system has the ability to integrate with the current military network, such as the Akashteer and the Integrated Air Command and Control System, for network-centric warfare. The counter-drone system was designed to help the Indian Army fend off widespread swarm drone attacks. When Bhargavastra detects a small incoming hostile drone more than 6 kilometers away, the full authority fire control system deploy micro-rockets or micro-missiles that can be directed in the direction of the threat. Low radar cross section targets can also be detected due to the embedded Electro-Optical/Infrared sensor. Economic Explosives Limited is responsible for the development of the micro-rocket/micro-missile munition. Bhargavastra can be quickly deployed by mounting it on a mobile platform. The system is made to function in all types of terrain, even those at high elevations of up to 5,000 meters. The system radar at the command center which is equipped with C4I (Command, Control, Communications, Computers, and Intelligence) can identify medium-sized to large UAVs at a distance of 10 km and extremely small drones at a distance of 6 km. A single launcher is capable of carrying 64 units of small lightweight guided and unguided micro-missiles and micro-rockets in 8 x 8 cassettes, allowing for multiple launches in 10 seconds with 360-degree coverage.

Bhargavastra can fire 64 micro-rockets/micro-missiles in salvo mode. Because of its modular design, the Bhargavastra can be enhanced with a soft-kill layer that incorporates spoofing and jamming to create a complete and integrated system. Radar, EO/IR/RF sensors, and the launcher are all modular components that can be set up to the user's specifications, and function as a single unit to provide layered and tiered air defense protection, allowing targets to be engaged at greater distance. An all-terrain vehicle in the 7.5-ton class can incorporate the multi-layered system in addition to a sensor mast and the soft-kill option. The primary radar is to identify airborne targets at a great distance. Target acquisition by visual tracking is facilitated by the electro-optical tracking system. The EO/IR sensor identifies targets in a variety of illumination settings by combining optical and infrared capabilities. Decision-making and situational awareness are improved by artificial intelligence. Due to situational awareness, Bhargavastra can determine whether to destroy a single hostile drone or a drone swarm simultaneously with rapid fire engagement. It takes less than 16 seconds from target recognition to interception. With homing capability, the micro-missiles can lock-on-after-launch.

== Trials ==
12 January 2025: The system successfully completed its maiden firing trial against a stationary target in the air at a distance of 2.5 km and at an altitude of 400 meters under controlled conditions in Seaward Firing Ranges in Gopalpur, Odisha.

13 January 2025: A perfect hit was achieved in a second controlled fire exercise against a moving electronic target at Gopalpur Seaward Firing Range.

13 May 2025: In front of senior officers from Corps of Army Air Defense, the system underwent three firing test at the Seaward Firing Ranges in Gopalpur. Each of the two trials involved firing a single rocket. Two rockets were fired in salvo mode in two seconds as part of third trial. To counter large-scale drone strikes, all four rockets met the necessary launch parameters and operated as planned. The first line of defense is unguided micro-rockets that can destroy a swarm of drones within a 20-meter radius. The second line of defense is guided micro-missiles, with improve accuracy to guarantee accurate and effective target neutralization. To improve the system's capacity to manage a wider array of threats, an extra electronic soft kill option is being added.

== See also ==
- Iron Dome
- Drone Dome
- Integrated Drone Detection & Interdiction System
