= 1K17 Szhatie =

Soviet experimental laser vehicle

1K17 Szhatie 1К17 Сжатие
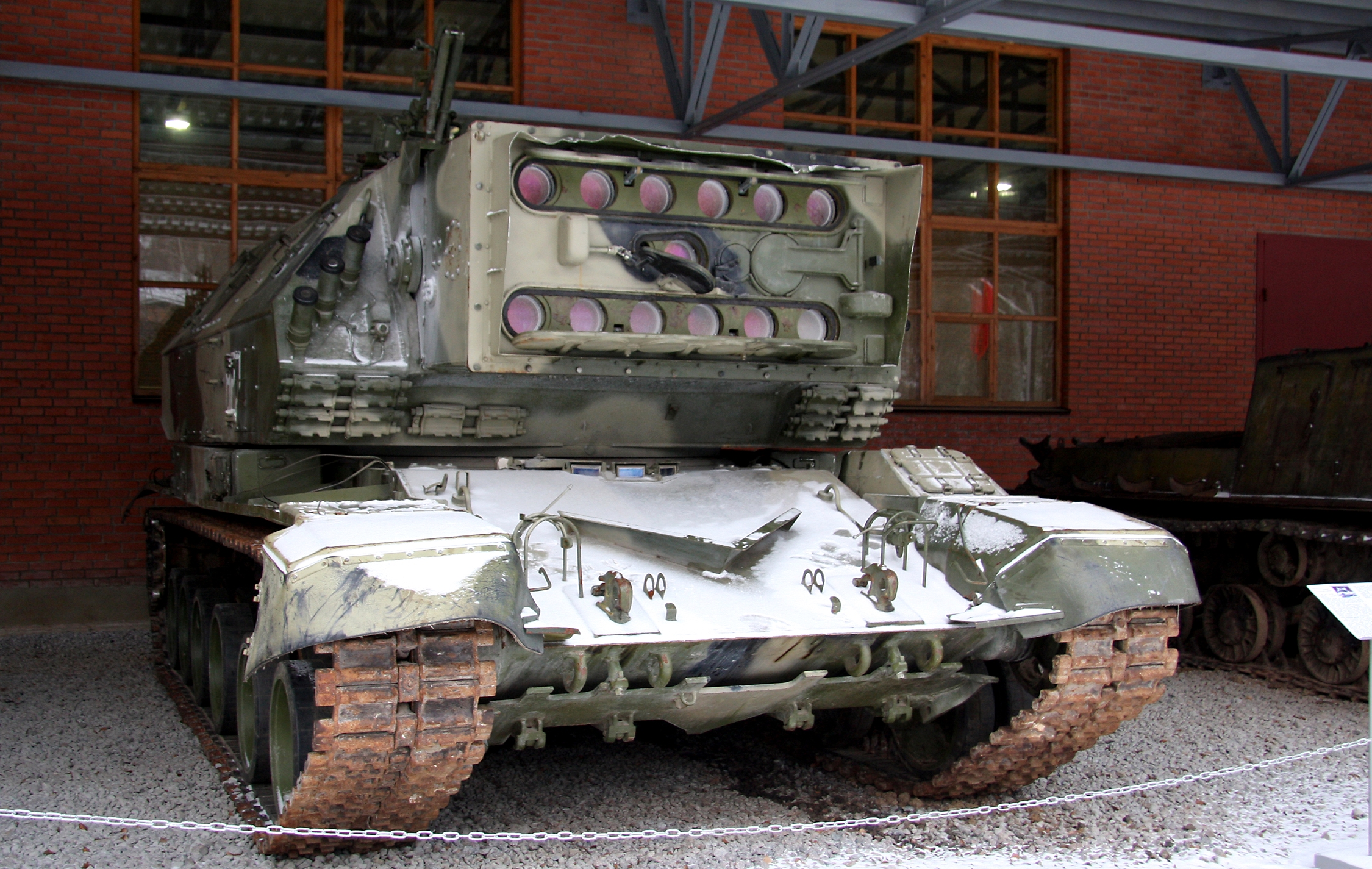
- A preserved 1K17 Szhatie
- Type: Self-propelled laser weapon carrier
- Place of origin: Soviet Union

Production history
- Designer: N. D. Ustinov
- Manufacturer: Uralmash
- Produced: 1990
- No. built: 1 prototype

Specifications
- Mass: 41 t (40 long tons; 45 short tons)
- Length: 6.04 m (19 ft 10 in) (hull)
- Width: 3.584 m (11 ft 9.1 in)
- Height: 3.3 m (10 ft 10 in)
- Crew: 2
- Armor: Homogeneous steel
- Main armament: 1 x 15-lenses high-powered solid-state laser emitter
- Secondary armament: 1 x 12.7 mm NSV machine gun
- Engine: B-84A; 840 hp
- Maximum speed: 60 km/h (37 mph) on road

The 1K17 Szhatie (Russian: 1К17 Сжатие — "Compression") is a self-propelled laser vehicle of Soviet origin. The platform uses a modified 2S19 "Msta" chassis with a battery of solid state laser projectors mounted in the turret. It was developed by the Soviet Union in order to disable the optical-electronic equipment of enemy missiles, ground and aerial vehicles.

== History ==
The 1K17 Szhatie was developed in the 1970s and 1980s. Although the Soviet Union attempted to keep the plans secret, the Pentagon managed to obtain drawings from defectors. Western intelligence services code named it the Stiletto. With the collapse of the Soviet Union, the development of the Szhatie was abandoned, as the development and manufacturing of the laser projection system had become too expensive and unnecessary. Two of these "tanks" were tested, with one being scrapped and the other being displayed in the Army Technology Museum near Moscow, but without its laser projector.

== Design ==
The "tank" used an intense laser beam to disable the optical-electronic equipment of the enemy vehicles. This was created by focusing light through 30 kg of artificial rubies, which made the whole system very expensive to produce. The optics that produced the laser were placed at the end of a silver coated spiral which helped amplify the beam and increase convergence. The energy to power the laser was provided by a generator and an auxiliary battery system. The lenses themselves were able to operate in different environments by moving metal caps closer to protect the lens. It was also equipped with a 12.7mm NSV machine gun to defend itself against attacks by infantry and air.

A similar laser system was also developed around the same time named "Sangvin", which was based on the ZSU-23-4 self-propelled anti-aircraft gun.
