= Self-Protect High-Energy Laser Demonstrator =

The Self-Protect High-Energy Laser Demonstrator (SHiELD) was a directed-energy weapons development program. The objective was to demonstrate the ability of a laser system mounted on aircraft by developing and integrating a moderate power laser in a fighter-compatible pod. In 2016 it was reported that United States Air Force was considering getting a defensive laser weapon for fifth and sixth generation fighter jets by 2021. The SHiELD program was concluded in May 2024.

== Technical description ==
The Self-Protect High-Energy Laser Demonstrator (SHiELD) was designed as a pod-mounted defensive laser system for integration on U.S. Air Force fighter aircraft. The program aimed to provide protection against infrared-guided missiles by disabling their seekers or fuel systems at standoff ranges.

=== Laser source ===
SHiELD employed a fiber laser architecture using spectral beam combining to merge multiple fiber outputs into a single high-power beam. Lockheed Martin received the prime contract in 2017 to develop the laser subsystem, with a target output in the tens of kilowatts range.

=== Power and cooling ===
The system was intended to draw electrical power from the host aircraft’s generators and batteries. AFRL documentation noted the need for advanced thermal management, including closed-loop liquid cooling, to sustain firing during supersonic flight.

=== Beam control ===
Adaptive optics, including deformable and fast-steering mirrors, were incorporated to stabilize the beam against turbulence, vibration, and aircraft motion. Targeting was to be integrated with infrared search-and-track (IRST) and missile warning sensors.

=== Integration ===
The demonstrator was housed in an external pod approximately 1.5 to 2 m in length and weighing close to one metric ton, compatible with fighter hardpoints such as those on the F-15 and F-16.

=== Engagement profile ===
The system was designed to engage infrared-guided missiles at ranges of several kilometers, with dwell times of a few seconds required to damage seeker heads or fuel tanks.

== Program conclusion ==
In May 2024, the U.S. Air Force formally ended the SHiELD program. Reports indicated that the effort closed without achieving a flight test of a laser-equipped fighter, citing technical challenges and shifting priorities.
