= 2026 Texas and New Mexico airspace closures =

Sudden closures of US airspace

In February 2026, three sudden temporary flight restrictions (TFRs) were imposed by the US Federal Aviation Administration (FAA) closing airspace in southeastern New Mexico and the Trans-Pecos region of Texas. The closures were enacted without any advance notice and banned low-altitude civilian flights for "special security reasons". The initial February 10 shutdown effectively closed El Paso International Airport, a major regional transportation hub, and was the first sudden closure of US airspace for security reasons since the September 11 attacks in 2001.

The February 10 El Paso closure was lifted within hours and was reportedly prompted by US Customs and Border Protection using an experimental military laser weapon, intended to shoot down drones, without coordination with the FAA, the agency responsible for civil aviation safety in the US. No reason was determined for a simultaneously enacted closure that affected southeastern New Mexico from February 10–13. A third closure affecting Fort Hancock, Texas, was enacted after the US military reportedly used a laser to down a drone that CBP was operating near US troops without their knowledge; the airspaces were reopened on June 24.

== Background ==
Military conflicts in the 2020s, prominently the 2022 Russian invasion of Ukraine, have demonstrated that small, cheaply constructed military drones can evade or overwhelm conventional air defense systems. This has prompted the reemergence of anti-aircraft laser weapons, which were previously deemed infeasible against conventional aircraft, but are potentially very potent against small drones while being much less expensive to deploy than surface-to-air missiles such as the MIM-104 Patriot.

Around this time, Mexican drug cartels began using drones with increasing frequency to conduct attacks on rival cartels and to smuggle contraband. According to a United States Department of Homeland Security (DHS) official, over 27,000 drones were detected within 500 metres (1,600 ft) of the US-Mexico border in the last six months of 2024. Efforts to stop cartel drones using radio jamming were declining in effectiveness because cartels were adopting military-grade electronic counter-countermeasures. At the time of the airspace closures, there was no record of a cartel drone attack taking place within the US, and the US and Mexican governments were reportedly working together to stop cartel drone incursions in the border region.

== February 10–11 El Paso closure ==
On the night of February 10, 2026, the Federal Aviation Administration (FAA) announced that most of El Paso's airspace would be closed for 10 days. The temporary flight restriction (TFR), beginning at 11:30 p.m. Mountain Standard Time (MST, UTC−07:00), prohibited all civilian flights including airlines, air medical services, and general aviation, and effectively closed El Paso International Airport, the primary commercial airport in the region. It covered a cylinder centered on the El Paso VORTAC at 31°48′26″N 106°22′35″W with a radius of 10 nautical miles (19 km; 12 mi) and ceiling of 17,999 feet MSL. This covered neighboring areas including Santa Teresa, New Mexico, Fort Bliss, and US airspace adjoining the border with Mexico, but it excluded Mexican airspace. The restriction was issued without any advance warning and said that "deadly force" may be used against aircraft that pose an "imminent security threat". The FAA said the restriction was enacted for "special security reasons" and did not state any additional details. At 7 a.m., less than eight hours after it was imposed, the FAA lifted the flight restriction and said it was prompted by a "Drug cartel drone incursion" and that "The threat has been neutralized".

The Associated Press and The New York Times reported that the FAA imposed the restriction because Customs and Border Protection (CBP, a branch of DHS) used an experimental laser weapon loaned from the US military to shoot down what it claimed were drug cartel drones. According to anonymous government sources, the FAA was unconvinced that the weapon would not harm civil aircraft, and issued the restriction after the weapon was used at Fort Bliss without coordinating with the FAA. In that case, the target turned out to be a party balloon. After the restriction was lifted, it was unclear whether laser weaponry use would continue. The Trump administration would not confirm the laser weapon explanation, but a statement by Gabe Vasquez, the US representative for New Mexico's 2nd congressional district, subsequently confirmed it.

A February 11 statement by the Trump administration said that the FAA administrator, Bryan Bedford, closed the airspace without consulting with DHS, the Department of Defense (DOD, alternately called the Department of War), or the administration. Despite this, internal FAA emails reviewed by the Times indicated that a senior FAA lawyer repeatedly warned senior DOD and CBP officials during the previous several days that the airspace would be closed unless the uncoordinated laser tests ceased, but after the party balloon was shot down on February 9, the DOD told the FAA that the tests would continue.

=== Reactions ===
Claims of drone presence by the administration were not independently corroborated, and numerous officials questioned the justification for the sudden airspace closure. Ted Cruz and John Cornyn, both US senators representing Texas, requested classified briefings. Veronica Escobar, US representative for most of El Paso, said that "There have been drone incursions from Mexico going back to as long as drones existed" and that the drone narrative was "not the information that we in Congress have been told." Mexican president Claudia Sheinbaum said she had no information about drone use at the Mexico–US border. Mayor Renard Johnson of El Paso complained that "You cannot restrict airspace over a major city without coordinating with the city, the airport, the hospitals, the community leaders. That failure to communicate is unacceptable."

The episode required the rerouting of multiple medical evacuation flights, and the cancellation of seven arriving and seven departing passenger flights.

== February 10–13 New Mexico closure ==
At the same time as the El Paso closure, the FAA imposed a similar 10-day airspace shutdown on civilian flights below 17,999 feet within a remote 2,000 sq mi (5,200 km^{2}) area of southern New Mexico west of Santa Teresa, encompassing part of the Organ Mountains–Desert Peaks National Monument to the north and ending at the Mexican border to the south. The closure was abruptly lifted around 8:30 p.m. MST on February 13 according to anonymous FAA officials. The FAA would not comment on the reason for this closure or the timing of its termination.

== February 26 Fort Hancock closure ==
A third sudden closure was enacted by the FAA on February 26 over the remote Texas border community of Fort Hancock, roughly 50 mi (80 km) southeast of El Paso, when soldiers reportedly felt threatened by a CBP drone that was being operated without notification and used an experimental laser weapon to shoot it down. The closure was scheduled to last until June 24. Unlike the two earlier closures, this closure allows civilian search and rescue and medical evacuation flights to operate with permission from air traffic control.

On the day of the closure, in a US Senate confirmation hearing for his nomination to become the assistant secretary of defense for homeland defense and Americas security affairs, DOD official Mark Roosevelt Ditlevson said "this [laser weapon] system is incredibly safe" and that a law requiring DOD coordination with the FAA "does not require approval from the FAA" before using laser weapons. Illinois senator Tammy Duckworth, a member of the confirmation panel, accused the Trump administration of "incompetence [that] continues to cause chaos in our skies".
