= AN/SEQ-3 Laser Weapon System =

Laser Weapon System
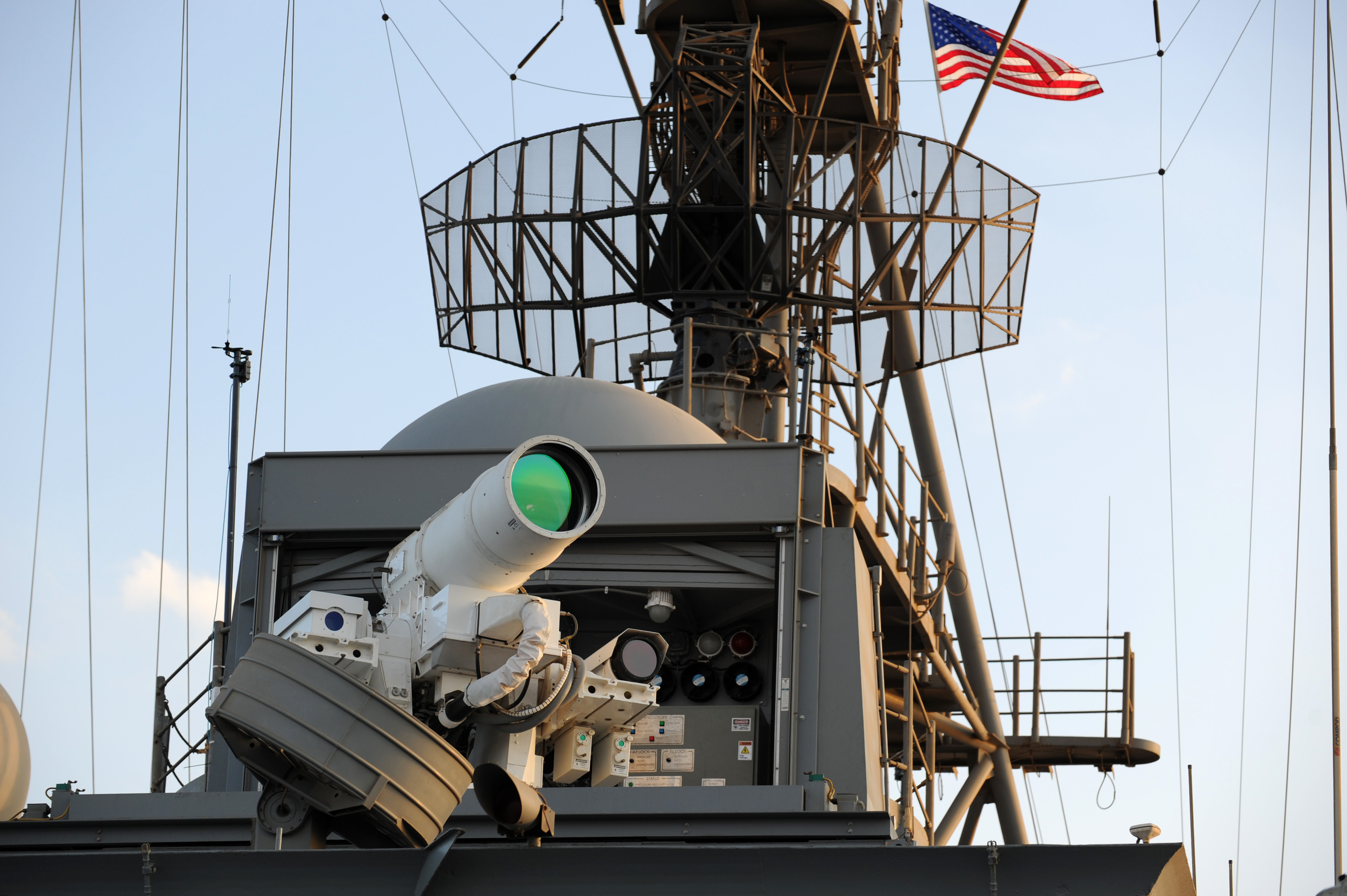
- The Laser Weapon System (LaWS) aboard USS Ponce.
- Type: Directed-energy weapon
- Place of origin: United States

Service history
- In service: 2014–present
- Used by: US Navy

Production history
- Designed: 2007–14
- Manufacturer: Naval Surface Warfare Center Dahlgren
- No. built: 1

Laser Weapon System (LaWS) demonstration aboard USS Ponce

The AN/SEQ-3 Laser Weapon System or XN-1 LaWS is a laser weapon developed by the United States Navy. The weapon was installed on USS Ponce for field testing in 2014. In December 2014, the United States Navy reported that the LaWS system worked perfectly against low-end asymmetric threats, and that the commander of Ponce was authorized to use the system as a defensive weapon. Due to various operational problems, LaWS was never put into mass production; it was replaced by the High Energy Laser with Integrated Optical-dazzler and Surveillance.

== Purpose ==
The LaWS is a ship-defense system that has so far publicly engaged an unmanned aerial vehicle (UAV or drone) and a simulated small-boat attacker. LaWS uses an infrared beam from a solid-state laser array which can be tuned to high output to destroy a target or low output to warn or cripple the sensors of a target. One of its advantages over projectile weapons is the low cost per shot: Each firing of the weapon requires only the minimal cost of generating the energetic pulse; by contrast, ordnance and for projectile weapons must be designed, manufactured, handled, transported, and maintained, and takes up storage space.

The LaWS is designed to be used against low-end asymmetric threats. Scalable power levels allow it to be used on low power to dazzle a person's eye non-lethally to turn away a threat, and to be used at high power, up to 30 kilowatts, to fry sensors, burn out motors, and detonate explosive materials. (Blinding laser weapons are prohibited by the Protocol on Blinding Laser Weapons, to which the United States is a party.) By lasing a vital point, LaWS can shoot down a small UAV in as little as two seconds. When facing small boats, the laser can target a craft's motor to disable it, then repeat this against other boats in rapid succession, requiring only a few seconds of firing per boat. Targeting the platform is more effective than targeting individual crewmembers, although the LaWS is accurate enough to target explosive rockets if on board, whose detonations could kill the operators. Against a larger aircraft like a helicopter, LaWS can burn through some vital components to cause it to crash.

== History ==
Design and development of LaWS began in March 2007 and was headed by Naval Surface Warfare Center (NSWC) Dahlgren with several universities and industrial firms. In 2010, Kratos Defense & Security Solutions was awarded an $11 million contract to support the NSWC in the development of LaWS for the U.S. Navy's Directed Energy and Electric Weapon Systems (DE&EWS) program. The May 24, 2010 NSWC test used a close-in weapon control system to enable the beam director to track an unmanned aerial vehicle target. The LaWS was to be installed on USS Ponce in summer 2014 for a 12-month trial deployment. The Navy spent about $40 million over the past six years on research, development, and testing of the laser weapon. It is directed to targets by the Phalanx CIWS radar. With tests going well, the Navy expected to deploy a laser weapon operationally between 2017 and 2021 with an effective range of 1 mi (1.6 km; 0.87 nmi). The exact level of power the LaWS will use is unknown but estimated between 15–50 Kilowatt (kW) for engaging small aircraft and high-speed boats. Directed-energy weapons are being pursued for economic reasons, as they can be fired for as little as one dollar per shot, while conventional gun rounds and missiles can cost thousands of dollars each. The Navy has a history of testing energy weapons, including megawatt chemical lasers in the 1980s. Their chemicals were found to be too hazardous for shipboard use, so they turned to less powerful fiber solid-state lasers. Other types can include slab solid state and free electron lasers. The LaWS benefitted from commercial laser developments, with the system basically being six welding lasers "strapped together" that, although they don't become a single beam, all converge on the target at the same time. It generates 33 kW in testing, with follow-on deployable weapons generating 60–100 kW mounted on a Littoral Combat Ship or Arleigh Burke-class destroyer to destroy fast-attack boats, drones, manned aircraft, and anti-ship cruise missiles out to a few miles. In the short term, the LaWS will act as a short-range, self-defense system against drones and boats, while more powerful lasers in the future should have enough power to destroy anti-ship missiles; Navy slab lasers have been tested at 105 kW with increases to 300 kW planned. Laser weapons like the LaWS are meant to complement other missile and gun-based defense systems rather than replace them. While lasers are significantly cheaper and have virtually unlimited magazines, their beams can be disrupted by atmospheric and weather conditions (especially when operating at the ocean's surface) and are restricted to line-of-sight firing to continuously keep the beam on target. More conventional systems will remain in place for larger and longer-range targets that require the use of kinetic defense.

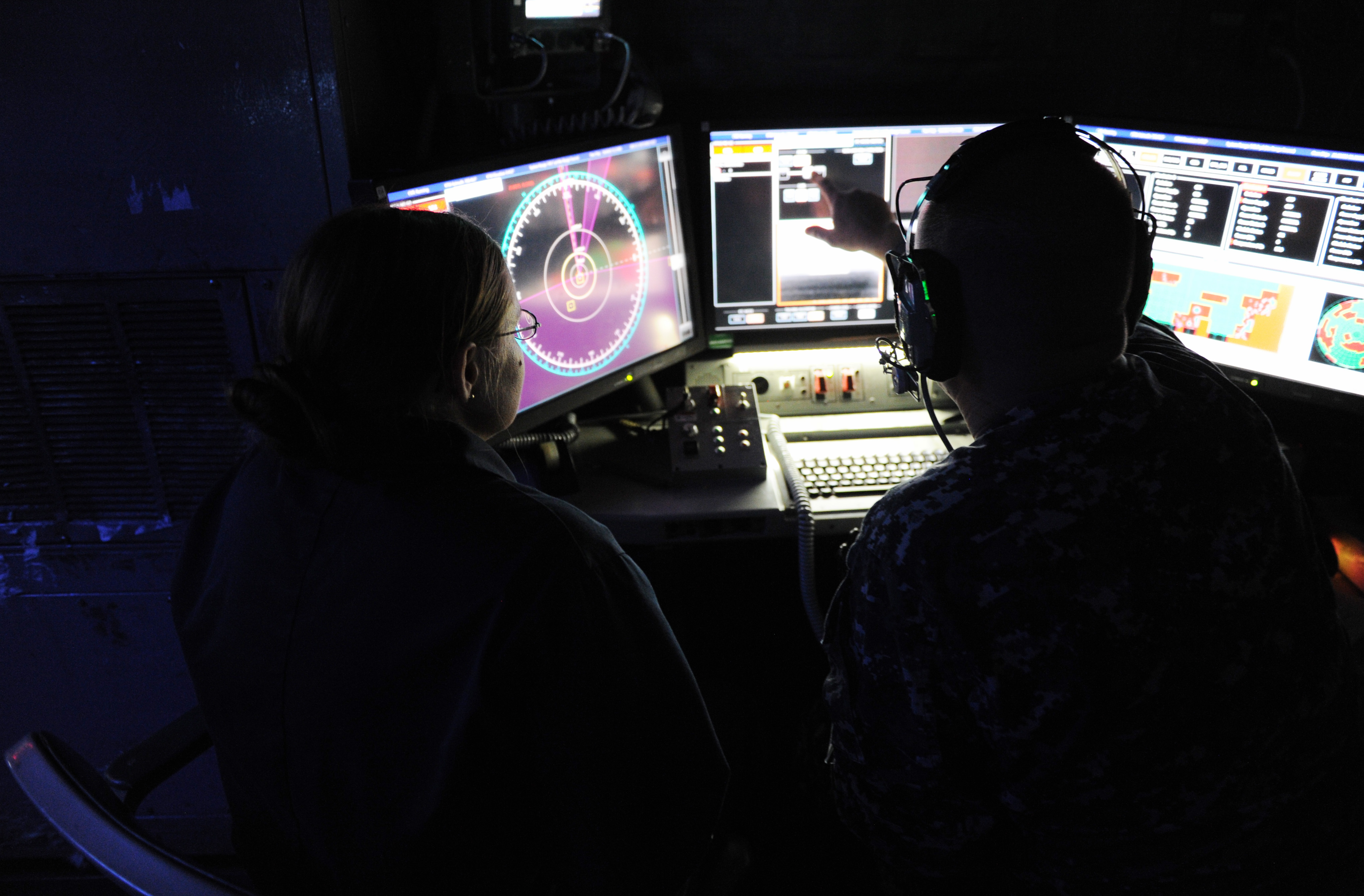
The LaWS control station aboard USS Ponce.

=== Deployment ===
The LaWS was deployed on Ponce in late August 2014 to the Persian Gulf with the U.S. 5th Fleet to test the feasibility of a laser weapon in a maritime environment against heat, humidity, dust, and salt water and to see how much power is used. The system has scalable power levels to be able to fire a non-lethal beam to dazzle a suspect vessel, and fire stronger beams to physically destroy a target; range is classified. Although neighboring Iran has threatened to block the Strait of Hormuz using small boat swarms that the LaWS is able to counter, it was not designed or deployed specifically to be used against any one particular country.

In September 2014, the LaWS was declared an operational asset, so ship commanders were authorized to use it for self-defense. Humans are not a target of the weapon under stipulations of the Convention on Certain Conventional Weapons, but targets do include UAVs, helicopters, and fast patrol craft. Rules of engagement have been developed for its use, but details have not been released, although the Convention on Certain Conventional Weapons Rules of Engagement (ROE) prohibit using laser weapons against humans. The Navy has released video of the LaWS on deployment disabling a ScanEagle UAV, detonating a rocket-propelled grenade, and burning out the engine of a rigid hull inflatable boat (RHIB). Officials said it is working beyond expectations. Compared to hundreds of thousands or millions of dollars for a missile, one laser shot costs only 59 cents. Composed of commercial laser components and proprietary Navy software, it is powered and cooled by a "skid" through a diesel generator, separate from the ship's electrical systems, giving greater efficiency relative to power provided of 35 percent. Mounted on Ponce's superstructure above the bridge, its optics are also useful as a surveillance tool that can detect objects at unspecified but "tactically significant ranges"; sailors have equated its surveillance abilities to having the Hubble Space Telescope at sea. Sailors used it for targeting and training daily, whether to disable or destroy test targets or for potential target identification. The system is operated through a flat screen monitor and a gaming system-like controller integrated into the ship's combat system, so anyone with experience playing common video games can operate the weapon. It functioned well against adverse weather, and is able to work in high humidity and after a dust storm. However, the system is not expected to work during harsh sandstorms and has not been tested in such conditions because "it didn't make much sense to", but threats would also not be expected to be operational under the same conditions. Deployments on other ships are being examined and although the LaWS was planned to remain deployed for one year, it performed so well that fleet leadership decided to keep it on Ponce as long as it was at sea.

Following a review of several ship classes to determine which had available space, power, and cooling, it was decided that after Ponce's planned decommissioning in 2018, the LaWS will be moved to the new amphibious transport dock ship USS Portland (LPD-27) for indefinite testing. It will utilise the space and power connections reserved for its vertical launching system to house the LaWS power and control modules while the laser itself will be bolted to the deck. Because the installation will be only a trial, LaWS will not be integrated into the ship's warfare system.

Various issues prevented the LaWS from entering serial production. As a developmental prototype, it had bulky trickle charge capacitors and a long charge time, difficulty tracking small targets, and problems producing a single synchronised and coherent beam from the six smaller emitters. In January 2018, the Navy announced a US$150 million contract with Lockheed Martin for the production of two HELIOS (High Energy Laser with Integrated Optical-dazzler and Surveillance) units, due for delivery in 2020; one was to be fitted to USS Arleigh Burke (DDG-51) while the other was intended for land-based testing. Further contract options could bring its value to $942.8 million. In August 2022, a HELIOS systems was delivered to the US Navy.

== See also ==
- DragonFire (weapon)
- Iron Beam
- Laser weapon
- Peresvet (laser weapon)
- Silent Hunter (laser weapon)
- Tactical High Energy Laser
