= HELIOS =

Laser-based weapon system

High Energy Laser with Integrated Optical-dazzler and Surveillance (HELIOS)
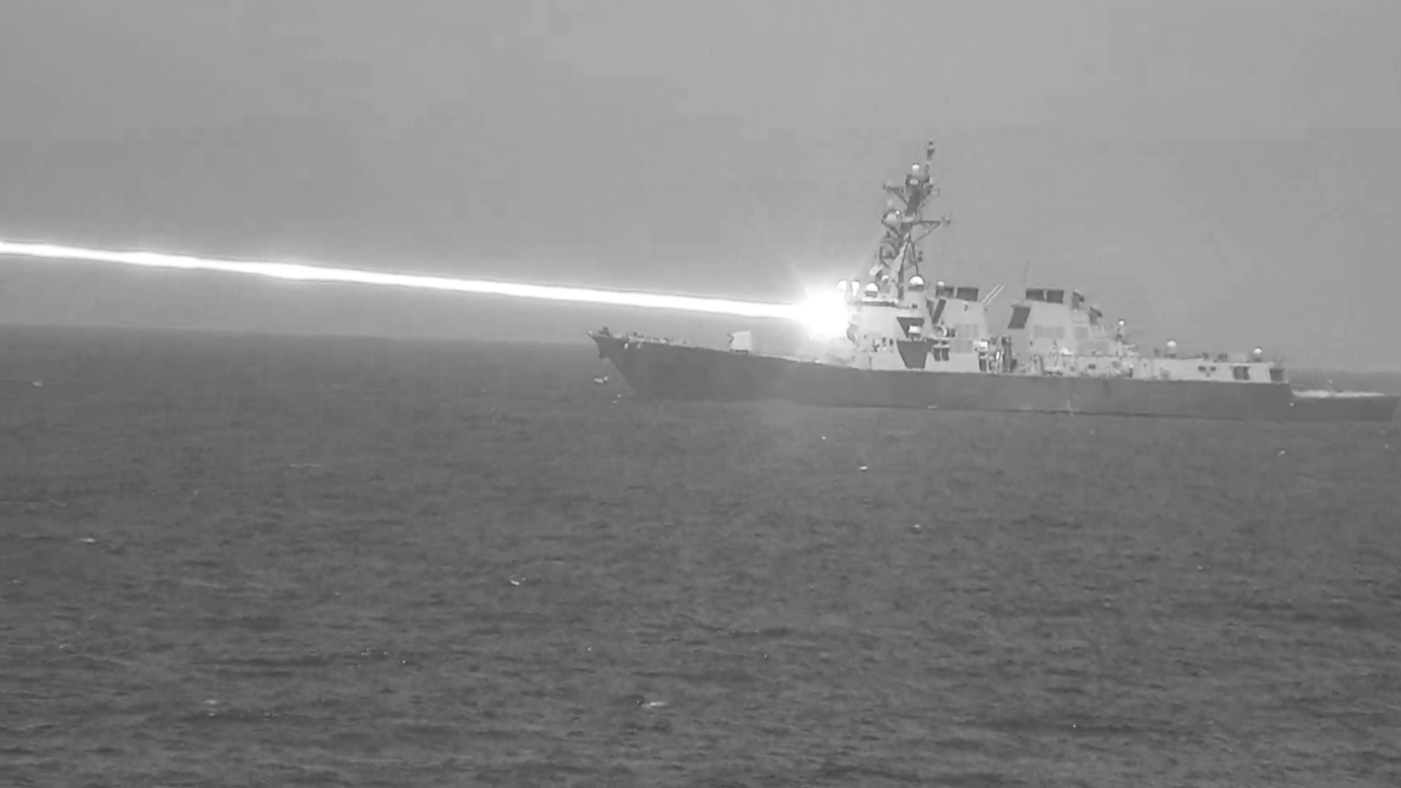
- USS Preble (DDG-88) firing its HELIOS system
- Type: Laser weapon
- Place of origin: United States

Service history
- In service: 2019–present
- Used by: United States Navy

Production history
- Designer: Lockheed Martin
- Designed: 2018–2019
- Manufacturer: Lockheed Martin

The High Energy Laser with Integrated Optical-dazzler and Surveillance (HELIOS) or Mk 5 Mod 0 HELIOS is a Lockheed Martin-developed 60 kilowatt high-energy laser weapon designed to intercept combat drones, fast-attack craft, and missiles. After winning the contract in 2018, the first announced installation was on USS Preble (DDG-88) in 2019. By 2021, it was reportedly deployed onto the Arleigh Burke-class ship as part of its anti-air Aegis Combat System.

== Purpose ==
The HELIOS system uses a modular power and fiber-optic configuration that can be expanded to fire at between 60 and 120 kW. Besides drone and missile defense, it also performs long range surveillance (ISR) and sensor dazzling. Its purported advantages are high precision, efficient "cost to kill", and power capacity for multiple shots ranging as far as 6 miles. As of 2024, higher-power laser weapons in the 150 to 300 kW range are being tested against anti-ship cruise missiles.

Designed to be integrated into the Aegis Combat System, HELIOS augments naval and air defense by providing a directed-energy option. It offers soft-kill measures such as blinding optical sensors on incoming targets, and hard-kill measures by heating and damaging structural components of a target, causing it to combust into flames. The system relies on ship power, enabling long term weapon operation limited only by maintaining constant power and cooling. This reliance allows repeated engagements without the need to reload or resupply its ammunition. However, Flight III Arleigh Burke-class destroyers require more electrical power generation for their AN/SPY-6 radar, leaving little extra power for additional systems. Rear Admiral Ronald Boxall, while serving as the director of Navy surface warfare, said, "The Navy will have to either remove something or look at 'very aggressive power management.'".

HELIOS is also adaptable to other ship types and combat systems, such as aircraft carriers and amphibious assault ships fitted with the Ship Self-Defense System.

== Characteristics ==
HELIOS uses multiple kilowatt fiber lasers which are spectrally combined to create a beam capable of consistent output at 60 kW with the potential to operate at 150 kW.

As opposed to a "bolt-on" capable weapon such as the Optical Dazzling Interdictor, Navy (ODIN), a device that has already been fielded to numerous Arleigh Burke-class destroyers, HELIOS is directly integrated with the ship's combat system, allowing it to operate with the onboard fire control systems and radars. ODIN also only maintains the capability to dazzle and deter optical sensors rather than hard-kill, while HELIOS can do both. HELIOS is also capable of using its laser as a sensor for precise targeting data, more accurate than its ship's combat system and onboard sensors.

The U.S. Navy plans to use HELIOS as an early test into integrated shipborne directed-energy weapons in its surface fleet, hoping to develop their doctrine into the ability to utilize lasers against larger targets such as anti-ship missiles or cruise missiles.

== History ==
Development of HELIOS began following operational issues with the AN/SEQ-3 Laser Weapon System, with a $150 million dollar contract being awarded to Lockheed Martin by the U.S. Navy in 2018 with the purpose of designing a high energy laser capable of precision accuracy used for countering drones, fast-attack vehicles, and anti-ship missiles to be built and delivered, one for land-based testing and one for installation aboard a Flight IIA Arleigh Burke-class destroyer.

The system was intended to work with Aegis Combat System fitted vessels, along with rapid integration to vessels operating with similar systems.

== See also ==
- AN/SEQ-3 Laser Weapon System
- Protocol on Blinding Laser Weapons
- DragonFire (weapon)
- Iron Beam
- LY-1
- Integrated Drone Detection & Interdiction System
