= Soviet laser pistol =

Prototype handheld energy weapon

- Type: Laser
- Place of origin: Soviet Union

Production history
- Designer: V. S. Sulakvelidze (project manager), B. N. Duvanov, A. V. Simonov, L. I. Avakyants, V. V. Gorev
- Designed: 1984
- Variants: Revolver

Specifications
- Length: 180mm
- Cartridge: Pyrotechnic flashbulb
- Effective firing range: 20 meters
- Feed system: 8-round box magazine

The Soviet laser pistol was a prototype handgun-shaped energy weapon designed for use by cosmonauts in a low or zero-gravity environment that renders conventional firearms ineffective. The weapon was magazine fed and used pyrotechnic flashbulb technology to project its beam. One variation of the gun was a six-shot laser revolver.

== History and design ==
With the development of the Space Shuttle, the Soviets began to worry that the US would be able to snatch satellites from orbit and carry them back to Earth. This fear prompted the development of the laser gun.

The weapons were designed to either disable optical sensors on enemy spacecraft or to flash-blind enemy astronauts when engaged in an orbital combat aboard or out of spacecraft. The last scenario was considered implausible, however, and the gun had no deadly force. Its energy output was sufficient to inflict damage on optical devices and cause eye injuries.

Because of the environment of its intended use, the gun had to be differently engineered than other hand held weapons:

To meet all the requirements, Soviet engineers designed a lamp filled with oxygen and containing metallic foil or powder. Instead of magnesium, which was traditionally used in strobe lights, the laser would be "fueled" by zirconium, which produced three times more light energy. Some metallic salt additives were used to match the wavelength of the flash with the range of the laser system. An yttrium aluminum garnet crystal initially served as a "medium" where the infrared laser beam would be generated after each flash.

As Perestroika began and spurred the "new political thinking" disarmament doctrine, the project was terminated.

== See also ==
- TP-82 Cosmonaut survival pistol

== External images ==
- media.moddb.com image
- media.moddb.com image
- jollyroger666.narod.ru image
