= Precision Airborne Standoff Directed Energy Weapon =

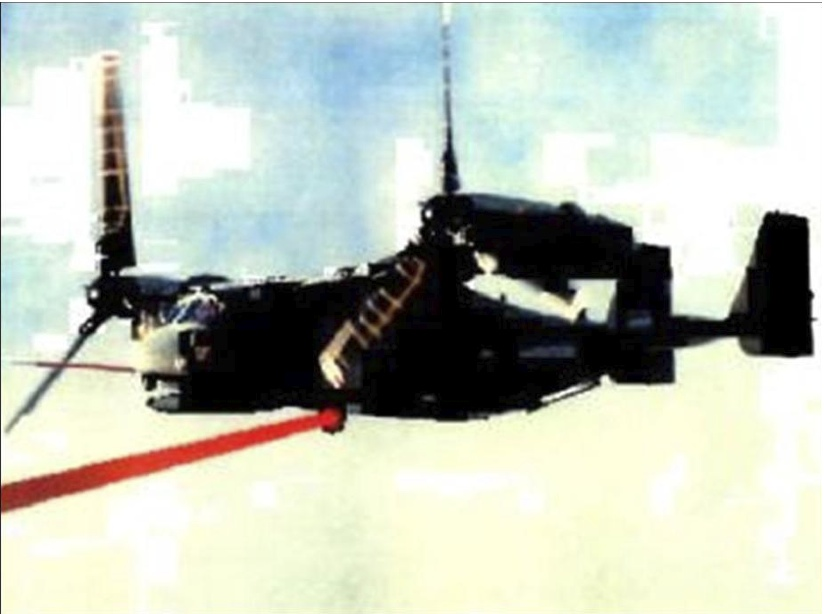
Fired from a distance, the Precision Airborne Standoff Directed Energy Weapon would be able set suspected enemies on fire, from a great distance.

The Precision Airborne Standoff Directed Energy Weapon was a weapons system described in unclassified documents leaked to Wired magazine in 2007.

In 2008 Boeing tested a prototype of the weapon, mounted in a C-130.

Some commentators compared the military`s requests with fantastical science fiction. They have repeated passages from the military briefing documents where the weapon was described as like a long distance blow torch. It was described as being able to erode the morale of enemies by showing the USA had the ability to set suspects on fire from a distance. It was also described as being able to incapacitate vehicles by bursting their tires, at lower intensity levels.

In 2012 Wired reported that the Naval Criminal Investigation Service was trying to track the individual who leaked the documents, even though they were not classified.
