= DragonFire (weapon) =

UK laser weapon technology demonstrator

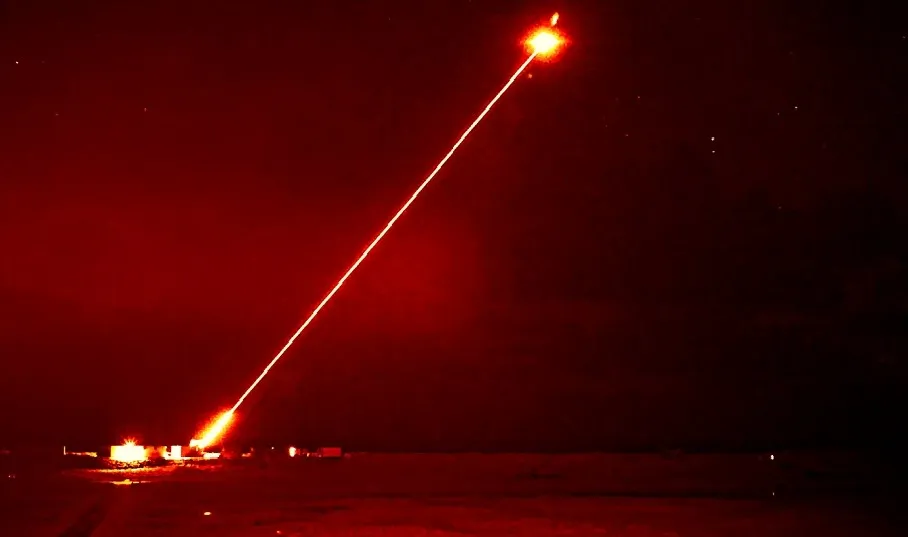
- A DragonFire laser test-fired in the Hebrides Range in Scotland, January 2024
- Type: Directed-energy weapon, Laser weapon
- Place of origin: United Kingdom

Service history
- In service: 2027 (planned)
- Used by: Royal Navy

Production history
- Manufacturer: UK DragonFire

DragonFire is a British laser directed-energy weapon (LDEW) in development for the Royal Navy. It was first unveiled to the public as a technology demonstrator in 2017 at the Defence and Security Equipment International (DSEI) conference in London and is being developed by UK DragonFire, a collaboration consisting of MBDA UK, Leonardo UK, QinetiQ and the Defence Science and Technology Laboratory (dstl). A production version is expected to enter service onboard Royal Navy ships in 2027.

== Development ==
The weapon was first shown publicly at the 2017 DSEI conference in London. Development of the technology demonstrator was to be carried out by a partnership between the British Ministry of Defence (MoD) and private industry. UK DragonFire is the result of contracts worth £100 million – of which £30 million was awarded by the MoD's Chief Scientific Advisor's Research Programme – from various companies, led by MBDA UK with QinetiQ, Leonardo, GKN, Arke, BAE Systems and Marshall Land Systems participating, to develop a technology demonstrator.

Trials were to begin in 2018, followed by a major demonstration in 2019; however, the COVID-19 pandemic and technical problems caused delays. It was ultimately deployed on trials in 2022 on the ranges in the Outer Hebrides in Scotland. According to MBDA, these initial low-power trials proved DragonFire's ability to track air and sea targets with exceptionally high accuracy. This was followed by high-power trials in November 2022, where the weapon engaged targets using its high-power laser in operationally representative scenarios. DragonFire engaged an airborne target in exercises in Scotland in January 2024. The MoD stated: "The range of DragonFire is classified, but it is a line-of-sight weapon and can engage with any visible target. The precision required is equivalent to hitting a £1 coin (23 mm) from a kilometre away." However, according to an article on Freethink, "On November 8, 2022, it revealed that the $115 million laser weapon had been fired at high power at targets, including a drone and metals like the ones used in ship hulls, at ranges up to 2.1 miles." It has been tested against mortar rounds and drones. The UK MoD claims the firing of the weapon, for 10 seconds, only costs £10 per shot.

In April 2024, the MoD announced that new procurement rules had increased the rate of development of the weapon and, as a result, it is expected to be in service onboard Royal Navy ships from 2027 instead of the originally planned 2032. UK Defence Secretary Grant Shapps stated that an early version of the weapon could be used by Ukraine in its defence against the Russian Invasion of Ukraine.

QinetiQ, one of the companies involved in the development of DragonFire, is also contributing to an Australian effort to develop a similar weapon; technology and expertise from DragonFire has fed into its development.

On 26 March 2025, additional funding was secured to accelerate DragonFire's entry into service; four ships, rather than one, will be equipped with the system by 2027.

== Characteristics ==
DragonFire is powered through the use of tens of glass fibres; however, the full technical approach remains undisclosed. The laser and its associated targeting systems, including an electro-optical camera and second lower-power laser for imaging and tracking, are mounted to a turret. The laser is reportedly in the 50 kW class and is designed to defend land and maritime targets from threats such as missiles and mortar rounds. Its energy demands may be met by a Flywheel Energy Storage System (FESS), a joint UK–US innovation currently in development. The range of the weapon is undisclosed information. Cost per firing is very low; it has been stated as £10.

The UK envisages high-energy laser weapons, such as DragonFire, onboard future Royal Navy warships, British Army armoured vehicles and fighter aircraft of the Royal Air Force, including the BAE Systems Tempest; it aims to demonstrate these concepts on board a Type 23 frigate and a Wolfhound armoured vehicle.

== Operators ==
=== Future operators ===
United Kingdom

- Royal Navy (from 2027)
- Royal Air Force (Tempest)
- British Army (Wolfhound armoured vehicle)

Ukraine (potential operator)

== Similar weapons ==
- RapidDestroyer - a parallel development of a radio frequency directed-energy weapon
- HELIOS (United States)
- Iron Beam (Israel)
- ALKA (weapon) (Turkey)
- Integrated Drone Detection & Interdiction System (India)

== See also ==
- Laser weapon
