= Boeing Laser Avenger =

Laser weaponry

Boeing Laser Avenger is an infrared laser system (with power levels somewhere in the tens of kilowatts range) mounted on an AN/TWQ-1 Avenger combat vehicle developed by Boeing Combat Systems in Huntsville, Alabama.

Laser Avenger integrates a directed energy weapon together with the kinetic weapons of the Avenger air defense system.

== History ==
Jan 2009 - "If funded by the Pentagon, the Laser Avenger could be available within a year," said Boeing spokesman Marc Selinger. Boeing has so far funded the project itself.

Dec 2008 - Testing at White Sands Missile Range, N.M., Laser Avenger succeeded in its principal test objectives by targeting and tracking 3 small UAVs (flying against the complex backdrop of mountains and desert). It also shot down one of the UAVs from an operationally relevant range. This marks the first time a combat vehicle has used a laser to shoot down a UAV. As part of the overall counter-UAV demonstration, Boeing also successfully test-fired a lightweight 25mm machine gun from the Laser Avenger platform to potentially further the hybrid directed energy/kinetic energy capability against UAV threats.

Representatives of the U.S. Army's Cruise Missile Defense Systems project office observed the tests.

Gary Fitzmire, vice president and program director of Boeing Directed Energy Systems has stated "Small UAVs armed with explosives or equipped with surveillance sensors are a growing threat on the battlefield. Laser Avenger, unlike a conventional weapon, can fire its laser beam without creating missile exhaust or gun flashes that would reveal its position. As a result, Laser Avenger can neutralize these UAV threats while keeping our troops safe."

September 2007 - Boeing successfully tested a 1 kW solid state laser weapon mounted on a converted Avenger anti aircraft vehicle in Redstone Arsenal, Alabama. The laser successfully destroyed several unexploded mortar shells from a safe distance and was also able to destroy two unmanned aerial vehicles (which were on the ground).
