= Silent Hunter (laser weapon) =

Anti-drone technology

The Silent Hunter is an anti-drone laser weapon developed in China. It is an improved version of the 30-kilowatt Low-Altitude Laser Defending System (LASS) and is available in both fixed and mobile versions.

== Specifications ==
The Silent Hunter uses an electrically powered fiber optic laser and according to one Poly Technologies official, the "Silent Hunter’s laser was more powerful than 30 kilowatts but less than 100 [kilowatts]." At the 2017 IDEX (International Defence Exhibition) show in Abu Dhabi, Poly Technologies showed a video claiming the "laser could “ablate” or penetrate five 2 millimeter steel plates at a range of 800 meters," and also an official stated it "could penetrate 5 millimeters of steel at 1,000 meters." At this same conference, officials from Poly Technologies also stated that "they are working on more powerful versions, but that its size prevented an airborne version of Silent Hunter."

== Operational history ==
The Silent Hunter has been used by Saudi Arabia to guard against Houthi drones and missiles. So far, eight systems have been spotted and are used in conjunction with truck mounted 3D TWA radar optimized for detecting low flying drones.

In November 2022, a variant of Silent Hunter in service with the Air Force was unveiled at the Zhuhai Airshow. It can operate alone or be used as a part of a network.

During the World Defense Show in Riyadh on February 5, 2024, Poly Technologies announced the first hard-kill engagement of a one-way attack drone.

In 2025, Silent Hunter was filmed in use by Russian forces in their invasion of Ukraine.

== International exhibition ==
The Silent Hunter was first unveiled at the 2017 IDEX show in Abu Dhabi. It was again showcased at the International Exhibition of Weapons Systems and Military Equipment (KADEX) in Kazakhstan in 2018. A variant of Silent Hunter in service with the Air Force debuted at Zhuhai Airshow 2022.

== Operators ==
China

- People's Liberation Army Air Force – Unknown number in inventory.

Saudi Arabia

- Royal Saudi Air Defense – At least 8 units.

Iran

- Unknown number in service

Russia

- Unknown number in service

== See also ==
- ZKZM-500, a handheld laser weapon designed by the PRC.
- OW5
- LY-1
