= Swarm drone =

Drones designed to operate together

Swarm drones are drones especially designed to operate together as robotic swarms. Swarming is designed to maximise target saturation and overwhelm enemy defenses during attack missions.

== Military operators ==
=== India ===
In November 2021, Defence Research and Development Organisation showcased an armed swarm technology with minimal human efforts. The drones were operable at high-altitudes, rough-weather conditions and can fly at a speed of 100 km/h (62 mph) and strike multiple targets. For promoting the development of swarm drones, the Indian Air Force organised a three-year long competition in 2018. In January 2025, NewSpace, which won the competition, was awarded a US$15 million contract for the manufacture of swarm drones for the Indian Army. Hindustan Aeronautics Limited supported NewSpace for research and development of the technology.

=== Israel ===
Swarm drones were allegedly used by the Israel Defense Forces for attacking rocket launch sites in Gaza strip, and against the Iranian Armed Forces.
