= Protocol on Blinding Laser Weapons =

1995 international treaty

A laser gun

The Protocol on Blinding Laser Weapons, Protocol IV of the 1980 Convention on Certain Conventional Weapons, was issued by the United Nations on 13 October 1995. It came into force on 30 July 1998. As of the end of April 2018, the protocol had been agreed to by 109 nations.

== History ==
The Convention on Certain Conventional Weapons and three annexed protocols were adopted on 10 October 1980 and opened for signature on 10 April 1981. In 1986, Sweden and Switzerland pushed for the Blinding Laser Protocol. During 1989–91, the International Committee of the Red Cross (ICRC) held four international meetings of experts on the topic and in 1993 published Blinding Weapons.

== Protocol text ==
=== Article 1 ===
It is prohibited to employ laser weapons specifically designed, as their sole combat function or as one of their combat functions, to cause permanent blindness to unenhanced vision, that is to the naked eye or to the eye with corrective eyesight devices. The High Contracting Parties shall not transfer such weapons to any State or non-State entity.

=== Article 2 ===
In the employment of laser systems, the High Contracting Parties shall take all feasible precautions to avoid the incidence of permanent blindness to unenhanced vision. Such precautions shall include training of their armed forces and other practical measures.

=== Article 3 ===
Blinding as an incidental or collateral effect of the legitimate military employment of laser systems, including laser systems used against optical equipment, is not covered by the prohibition of this Protocol.

=== Article 4 ===
For the purpose of this protocol "permanent blindness" means irreversible and uncorrectable loss of vision which is seriously disabling with no prospect of recovery. Serious disability is equivalent to visual acuity of less than 20/200 Snellen measured using both eyes.

== Historical significance ==
ICRC welcomed the ban on blinding lasers as "a significant breakthrough in international humanitarian law," adding:

The prohibition, in advance, of the use of an abhorrent new weapon the production and proliferation of which appeared imminent is an historic step for humanity. It represents the first time since 1868, when the use of exploding bullets was banned, that a weapon of military interest has been banned before its use on the battlefield and before a stream of victims gave visible proof of its tragic effects.

This was also the first international agreement regulating use of lasers during war. (Use of lasers during peace had been previously mentioned in Article IV of the US-Soviet Union Prevention of Dangerous Military Activities Agreement of 1989.)

== Limitations ==
The Protocol does not prohibit attacks against binoculars, periscopes, telescopes, and other optical equipment because it was unknown whether laser attacks on such devices could cause permanent blindness. Article 3 allows for attacks on electronic optical equipment, because damaging it would not cause human injury.

Ophthalmologist John Marshall argues that despite the Protocol's ban, countries continue to develop and use "rangefinders, target illuminators, and anti-sensor systems" that "are still effectively antipersonnel laser weapons" because these technologies have the potential to be employed against people in addition to their intended uses. For example, "a laser system that will dazzle at 1 mile [1.5 km] away may permanently blind at closer range." The only way to prevent all possible eye injuries by combat lasers would be to ban such lasers, but the countries negotiating the Protocol saw this as neither feasible militarily nor even desirable from a humanitarian standpoint because target-marking and rangefinding lasers are important for keeping munitions on target and away from civilians.
