= ALKA (weapon) =

ALKA (DEWS)
- Type: Directed-energy weapon, Counter unmanned air system
- Place of origin: Turkey

Service history
- In service: 2019-present
- Used by: Turkey
- Wars: Libyan Civil War (2014-2020)

Production history
- Designer: ROKETSAN

Specifications
- Effective firing range: Laser destruction range: 500 m Electromagnetic destruction range: 1000 m
- Guidance system: Automatic target detection by Radar or electro-optical methods
- Accuracy: 8 mm precision at 1000 m

The ALKA directed-energy weapon (DEW) system is a Turkish dual electromagnetic/laser weapon developed by the Turkish weapons manufacturer Roketsan. It was first unveiled at the 2019 IDEF exhibition on 8 May 2019. This combat laser was used by Libyan government forces to destroy a Chinese-made Wing Loong II UAV operated by the Libyan National Army, a rebel force. This represents the first known time a vehicle-mounted combat laser was used to destroy another combat vehicle during genuine wartime conditions.

== History ==
It was reported in 2010s that various Turkish organizations like TÜBİTAK SAGE and Aselsan had been working on tactical lasers and some had achieved success in both 2015 and 2018 prior to the unveiling of ALKA directed-energy weapon. According to Roketsan official Prof.Uğur Kayasal, the weapon was developed in response to the increase of drone attacks on Turkish forces. Roketsan spent five years making the directed energy weapon system and spent the last two years of the developmental period to make the system road-mobile. On 4 August 2019 an ALKA DEW mounted on an off-road armored car shot down a Chinese-made Wing Loong II UAV in Misrata, Libya.

== Characteristics ==
The ALKA DEW is claimed to have a power of 20 kW. It operates both laser and electromagnetic systems. It purportedly uses automatic target recognition utilizing both electro-optical and radar detection to track multiple targets simultaneously. It is claimed by its designers to have the capability to disable a swarm of drones at a range of 4000 m, destroy a target with laser at 500 m distance and destroy a target at 1000 m distance with electromagnetic weapons. According to the designers, it can track targets at speeds as high as 150 km/h and track targets with precision of 8 mm at 1000 m distance. It can purportedly operate in both night and day time and on multiple platforms, both stationary and mobile. It has allegedly been used both against IEDs and UAVs in multiple environments.
