= Terra-3 =

Soviet weapons testing center

Coordinates: 45°50′52.8″N 73°31′04.8″E

Terra-3 (Russian: терра–3) was a Soviet laser testing centre, located on the Sary Shagan anti-ballistic missile (ABM) testing range in the Karaganda Region of Kazakhstan. It was originally built to test missile defence concepts, but these attempts were dropped after the Anti-Ballistic Missile Treaty was signed. The site later hosted two modest devices used primarily for experiments in space tracking. Several other laser test sites were also active during this period. During the 1980s, officials within the United States Department of Defense (DoD) suggested it was the site of a prototypical anti-satellite weapon system. The site was abandoned and is now partially disassembled.

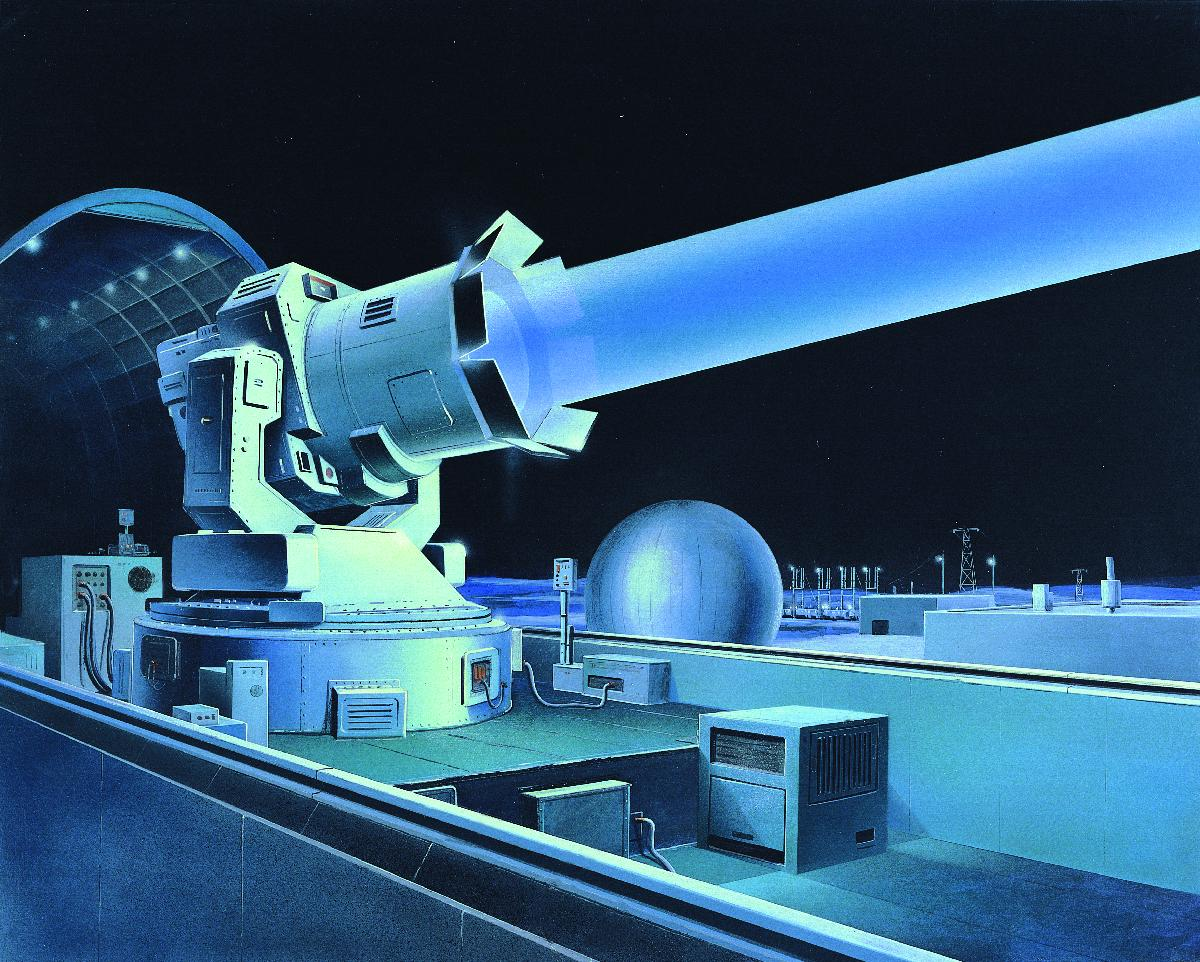
DIA drawing of Terra laser

== History ==
Terra-3

Development of laser weapons in the Soviet Union began in 1964–1965. Among many proposals for laser weapons was an explosively pumped gas dynamic laser. Construction, consisting of a large concrete bunker lined with steel plates, was begun at Sary Shagan, but the facility was far from complete when the Anti-Ballistic Missile Treaty was signed in 1972, and these efforts ended.

The buildings were then re-purposed for more modest laser systems. Vympel NPO led the construction and developed the tracking and aiming systems. The lasers were developed at Astrofizika, a company newly formed from the laser departments of several defence contractors. They installed two lasers at the site, a visible-light ruby laser that was installed in 1979, and an infrared carbon dioxide laser that was installed in 1982. Tracking systems were tested by fitting aircraft with laser detectors and then looking for signals when the lasers fired. There were also tests against satellites that passed over the site, in an effort to demonstrate the ability to blind optical sensors.

== Anti-satellite weapon claims ==
With the development of the Strategic Defense Initiative (SDI) in the early 1980s, the DoD began claiming that the Soviets were developing an anti-satellite laser weapons system at the Sary Shagan site. These statements were part of an argument suggesting that a sort of "laser gap" existed between the USSR and the US, harkening back to the mythical bomber gap and missile gap of previous decades. As it would turn out, this comparison was quite accurate, as the laser gap turned out to be equally mythical. Throughout, the Central Intelligence Agency (CIA) was returning reports on the site that were quite accurate, and at odds with the DoD's public statements. The DoD presented only the worst-case assessments found in the public portions of the CIA's reports.

With the ending of the Cold War, a delegation of US officials and experts were able to visit the site in July 1989. These observers noted a wide variety of evidence that the system, while intended to research the possibility of an anti-satellite laser capability, had never reached anywhere near the operational stage. The laser viewed by the US officials was extremely low-power, including the small size of the focusing optics and the uncooled director which would be incapable of handling a large laser. The lasers that they found were 1,000 times less powerful that the US's own MIRACL. The team dismissed the site as non-operational.

When discussing the issue, Soviet officials were somewhat amused. They noted that the US public often had better information than their own military, and that excessive secrecy had led the Soviet citizenry to distrust the military's claims as to their own capabilities.

== Space Shuttle attack rumour ==
Terra-3 is the topic of a claim that the IR laser was used to target the Space Shuttle Challenger during its 6th orbital mission on 10 October 1984 (STS-41-G). According to reports by Steven Zaloga, the Shuttle was briefly illuminated and caused "malfunctions on the space shuttle and distress to the crew," causing the United States to file a diplomatic protest about the incident. This claim appears to have started with former Soviet officials, notably Boris Kononenko. The crew members and "knowledgeable members of the US intelligence community" have denied that the shuttle was illuminated by the Terra-3.

== See also ==
- Omega (laser)
- 1K17 Szhatie
- Sokol Eshelon
- Peresvet
