= Chemical oxygen iodine laser =

US near-infrared chemical laser

A chemical oxygen iodine laser (COIL) is a near–infrared chemical laser. As the beam is infrared, it cannot be seen with the naked eye. It is capable of output power scaling up to megawatts in continuous mode. Its output wavelength is 1315 nm, a transition wavelength of atomic iodine.

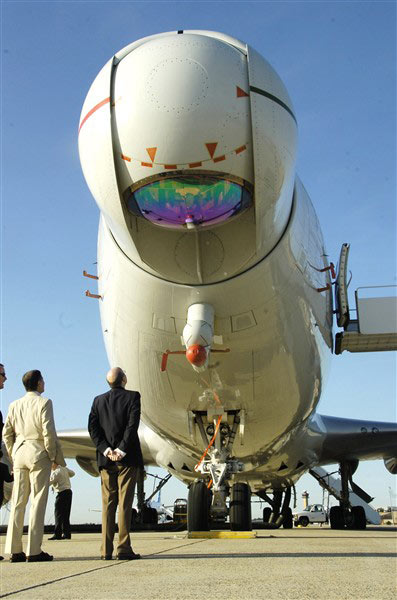
A COIL system mounted on a Boeing 747 variant known as the YAL-1 Airborne Laser.

== Principles of operation ==
The laser is fed with gaseous chlorine, molecular iodine, and an aqueous mixture of hydrogen peroxide and potassium hydroxide. The aqueous peroxide solution undergoes chemical reaction with chlorine, producing heat, potassium chloride, and oxygen in excited state, singlet delta oxygen. Spontaneous transition of excited oxygen to the triplet sigma ground state is forbidden giving the excited oxygen a spontaneous lifetime of about 45 minutes. This allows the singlet oxygen to transfer its energy to the iodine atoms present in the gas stream;the atomic transition 2P_{3/2} to 2P_{1/2} in atomic iodine is nearly resonant with the singlet oxygen, so the energy transfer during the collision of the particles is rapid. The excited iodine atoms 2P_{1/2} then undergoes stimulated emission and lases at 1.315 μm in the optical resonator region of the laser. ( the upper and lower iodine atomic states are reversed with the 2P_{1/2} being the upper state)

The laser operates at relatively low gas pressures, but the gas flow has to be nearing the speed of sound at the reaction time; even supersonic flow designs are described. The low pressure and fast flow make removal of heat from the lasing medium easy, in comparison with high-power solid-state lasers. The reaction products are potassium chloride, water, and oxygen. Traces of chlorine and iodine are removed from the exhaust gases by a halogen scrubber.

== History and applications ==
=== History ===
COIL was developed by the US Air Force at the Air Force Weapons Laboratory (now a part of the Air Force Research Laboratory), beginning in 1975, and first demonstrated in 1977.

Two industrial organizations participating in the early COIL developments were the McDonnell Douglas Research Laboratory and the Rocketdyne Division of Rockwell International. Both of these are now part of The Boeing Company and their laser and electro-optics capabilities have been incorporated into Boeing's Laser and Electro-Optic Systems organization. MDRL was the first industrial organization (and second only to the Air Force weapons Laboratory) to report a successful COIL. Rocketdyne was the first industrial organization to win a competitive award for COIL development.

Although it was invented as a weapon, its properties make it useful for industrial processing as well; the beam is focusable and can be transferred by an optical fiber, as its wavelength is not absorbed much by fused silica but is well absorbed by metals, making it suitable for laser cutting and drilling. Rapid cutting of stainless steel and hastelloy with a fiber-coupled COIL has been demonstrated.

In 1996, TRW Incorporated managed to get a continuous beam of hundreds of kilowatts of power that lasted for several seconds. The third Conference on Gas and Chemical Lasers and Intense Beam Applications history of the development of COIL was presented at the 2002

In 2002, SPIE held the third Conference on Gas and Chemical Lasers and Intense Beam Applications, celebrating the 25th anniversary of COIL. Various papers were presented covering the history of COIL as well as technological advancements. The conference included a banquet honoring the four inventors of COIL, Nick Pchelkin, Ron Bousek, Dave Benard, and Bill McDermott.

=== Applications ===
RADICL, Research Assessment, Device Improvement Chemical Laser, is a 20 kW COIL laser tested by the United States Air Force in around 1998.

COIL is a component of the United States' military airborne laser and advanced tactical laser programs. On February 11, 2010, this weapon was successfully deployed to shoot down a missile off the central California coast in a test conducted with a laser aboard a Boeing 747 that took off from Edwards Air Force Base (for more details, see Boeing YAL-1).

== Other iodine based lasers ==
All gas-phase iodine laser (AGIL) is a similar construction using all-gas reagents, more suitable for aerospace applications.

The ElectricOIL, or EOIL, offers the same iodine lasing species in an alternate gas-electric hybrid variant.

== See also ==
- Peresvet (laser weapon)
- List of laser articles
