= Skyguard =

Skyguard may refer to:

- Skyguard (air defense system)
- Skyguard radar, a system used with the Oerlikon GDF
