= Peresvet (disambiguation) =

Peresvet (Russian: Пересвет) is a town in Sergiyevo-Posadsky District, Moscow Oblast, Russia. It may also refer to:

- Alexander Peresvet (d. 1380), Russian Orthodox saint
- Peresvet bank, Russia
- FC Peresvet Domodedovo, Russia
- FC Spartak-Peresvet Bryansk, Russia
- Peresvet (laser weapon), Russian weapon for air defence and anti-satellite warfare
- Russian frigate Peresvet (ru) - 51-gun steam frigate launched in 1860 and stricken in 1874.
- Russian battleship Peresvet - Lead ship of the Peresvet-class predreadnoughts
- Peresvet (1939 icebreaker)
- Peresvet (icebreaker) - Dobrynya Nikitich-class icebreaker launched in 1969 and scrapped after 2011.
- Russian landing ship Peresvet - Ropucha-class landing ship launched in 1991 as BDK-11 and renamed Peresvet in 2006.
