= Tactical High Energy Laser =

Laser system designed by the United States and Israel for use in military operations

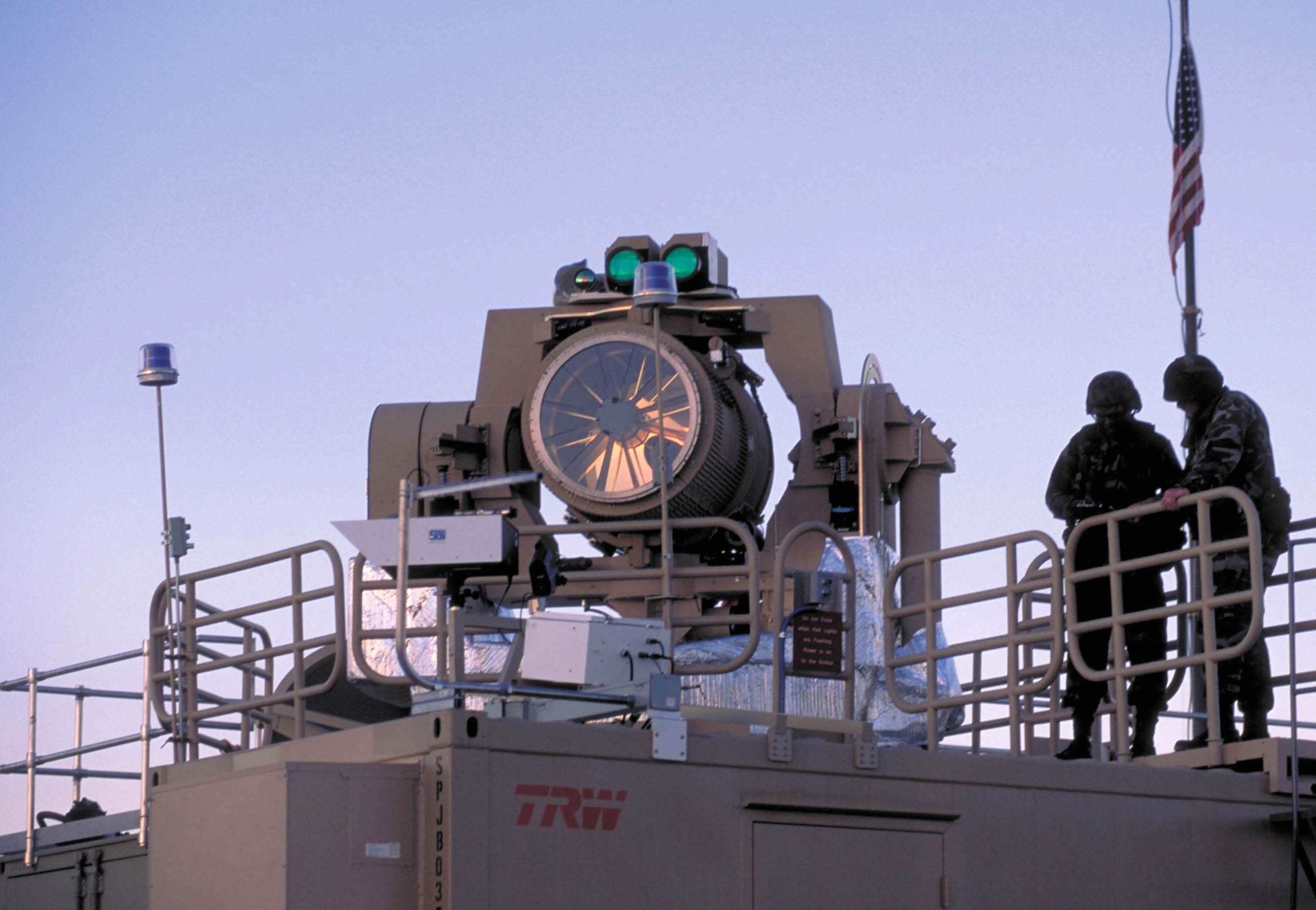
THEL/ACTD

The Tactical High-Energy Laser, or THEL, was a laser developed for military use, also known as the Nautilus laser system. The mobile version is the Mobile Tactical High-Energy Laser, or MTHEL. In 1996, the United States and Israel entered into an agreement to produce a cooperative THEL called the Demonstrator, which would utilize deuterium fluoride chemical laser technologies. In 2000 and 2001, THEL shot down 28 Katyusha artillery rockets and five artillery shells. On November 4, 2002, THEL shot down an incoming artillery shell. The prototype weapon was roughly the size of six city buses, made up of modules that held a command center, radar and a telescope for tracking targets, the chemical laser itself, fuel and reagent tanks, and a rotating mirror to reflect its beam toward speeding targets. It was discontinued in 2005.

== History ==
On July 18, 1996, the United States and Israel entered into an agreement to produce a cooperative Tactical High Energy Laser (THEL), called the Advanced Concept Technology Demonstrator, which would utilize deuterium fluoride chemical laser technologies. Primary among the four contractors awarded the project on September 30, 1996 was Northrop Grumman (formerly TRW). THEL conducted test firing in FY1998, and Initial Operating Capability (IOC) was planned in FY1999. However, this was significantly delayed due to reorienting the project as a mobile, not fixed, design, called Mobile Tactical High Energy Laser (MTHEL). The original fixed location design eliminates most weight, size and power restrictions, but is not compatible with the fluid, mobile nature of modern combat. The initial MTHEL goal was a mobile version the size of three large semi trailers. Ideally it would be further downsized to a single semi trailer size. However, doing this while maintaining the original performance characteristics is difficult. Furthermore, the Israeli government, which had been providing significant funding, decreased their financial support in 2004, postponing the IOC date to at least 2010.

In 2000 and 2001 THEL shot down 28 Katyusha artillery rockets and five artillery shells.

On November 4, 2002, THEL shot down an incoming artillery shell. A mobile version completed successful testing. During a test conducted on August 24, 2004 the system successfully shot down multiple mortar rounds. The test represented actual mortar threat scenarios. Targets were intercepted by the THEL testbed and destroyed. Both single mortar rounds and salvo were tested. Many military experts, such as the former head of the Administration for the Development of Weapons and the Technological Industry, Aluf Yitzhak Ben Yisrael, considered THEL to be a success and called for its implementation. However, in 2005, the US and Israel decided to discontinue developing the THEL after the project budget had surpassed $300 million. The decision came as a result of "its bulkiness, high costs and poor anticipated results on the battlefield." During the 2006 Lebanon War, Ben Yisrael, currently the chairman of the Israeli Space Agency, renewed his calls to implement the THEL against high-trajectory fire.

In 2007, Ehud Barak requested to reconsider project Skyguard (the next phase of THEL) in order to fight Qassam attacks.

== See also ==
=== Lasers ===
- Chemical laser
- Laser science
  - Active laser medium
  - Laser applications
  - Laser construction
- List of lasers
  - Deuterium fluoride laser
- List of laser articles

=== Laser weapons ===
- Advanced tactical laser
- Airborne laser Boeing YAL-1
- High Energy Liquid Laser Area Defense System (HELLADS)
- Skyguard
- Peresvet
- Iron Beam ("Or Eitan")
