= AL-1 =

AL-1 may refer to:

- Alabama's 1st congressional district
- Boeing YAL-1, a prototype airborne laser aircraft
