= Sokol Eshelon =

Sokol-Eshelon
- Type: Laser weapon
- Place of origin: Soviet Union/Russia

Production history
- Designer: Almaz-Antey/Beriev/Khimpromavtomatika

Specifications
- Effective firing range: 1,500 kilometres (930 mi)+

Sokol-Eshelon (Russian: Сокол-Эшелон, lit. 'Falcon-Echelon') is a Soviet/Russian laser weapon–based anti-satellite system. It is an airborne laser based on a Beriev A-60 aircraft. In 2012 it was reported that the project is back under development and is intended for the Russian Aerospace Defence Forces and later the Russian Aerospace Forces once completed.

== A-60 ==
The Beriev A-60 aircraft is a laser research plane produced by Beriev based on their Il-76 transport. Development seems to have started in 1981 with the laser installed in 1983. A second plane was built in 1991. The plane contains a special nose cone with a laser targeting system.

== Sokol-Eshelon ==
The Sokol Eshelon project started in 2003 and was first made public in the annual report of contractor Khimpromavtomatika in 2005. Other mentions include Almaz-Antey's annual report in 2006 and in a report by Radiofizika in 2009 where they mentioned their development of radar for the plane. Details also emerged due to a court case between Almaz-Antey and Beriev over payments to a subcontractor. The contract between the two parties was connected to a contract no. 5933 Almaz-Antey holds with military unit 21055. This contract is supervised by the Ministry of Defence's 27th Military Representative Office. The project seems to be known under the codename Duelyant (Russian: Дуэлянт, lit. 'Duelist').

In 2009 the plane was involved in a test to illuminate Japanese satellite AJISAI which was at an orbital height of 1,500 km. The test involved seeing if a reflection of the laser off the satellite could be picked up, and was not intended to damage the satellite.

The laser has been given the codename 1LK222. The purpose of the laser is to blind the sensors of enemy satellites rather than destroy them.

== See also ==
Related development:

- Beriev A-60
- Ilyushin Il-76

Comparable systems:

- Boeing NC-135
- Boeing YAL-1
