= High Energy Liquid Laser Area Defense System =

United States laser weapon program

The High Energy Liquid Laser Area Defense System (HELLADS), is a counter-RAM system under development that will use a powerful (150 kW) laser to shoot down rockets, missiles, artillery and mortar shells. The initial system will be demonstrated from a static ground-based installation, but in order to eventually be integrated on an aircraft, the final design would require a maximum weight of 750 kg (1,650 lb) and a maximum envelope of 2 cubic meters (70.6 feet^{3}).

Development is being funded by the Pentagon's Defense Advanced Research Projects Agency (DARPA).

== History ==
Liquid lasers that have large cooling systems can fire continuous beams, while solid state laser beams are more intense but generally must be fired in pulses to stop them from overheating. (As long as the heat transfer requirements are met solid state lasers can run continuously.) In the past, both types of lasers were very bulky because of their need for these huge cooling systems. The only aircraft in which they could fit were the size of jumbo jets.

Need for such a system was reinforced during the 2006 Lebanon War. Israel had participated in similar work in the past by funding the Mobile Tactical High Energy Laser (MTHEL). This system was tested on August 24, 2004, and was found to be effective at neutralizing mortar threats under an actual scenario. However, this test was administered with short, 20 km range missiles.

== Development ==
For the first few years of the program the Photonics Division of General Atomics was the prime contractor. The design combined the high energy density of a solid-state laser with the thermal management of a liquid laser. Dubbed the "HEL weapon", the initial prototype demonstrated firing a mild one kilowatt (kW) beam. Phase 3 of the program in 2007 demonstrated 15 kW power in a laboratory setting, and at the end of 2008 under the General Atomics bid, Lockheed Martin was selected as the weapon system integrator.

In September 2007, DARPA contracted Textron Systems to supply an alternate laser module using its proprietary "ThinZag" ceramic solid-state technology. Unlike the GA/Lockheed partnership, Textron will also perform the system integration function for their device. DARPA planned a "shoot-off" between the two contenders in 2009 to determine which would be funded to continue the program to further phases.

The more powerful version will produce a 150-kW beam capable of knocking down missiles with the weight and size requirements for fitting onto fighter aircraft or a Humvee. In mid 2008, Jane's International Defence Review quoted the US military that the program is on schedule to meet this ground test. Phase 4 of the program, involving outdoor testing of a weapon-power laser against tactical targets, was planned for 2010.

A prototype was expected to be available by the end of 2012. DARPA planned to use the completed prototypes against targets at White Sands Missile Range in early 2013. This included ground testing against rockets, mortars, and surface-to-air missiles.

DARPA planned for General Atomics to produce a second HELLADS system in January 2013 for use by the Office of Naval Research to test against targets "relevant to surface ships." The first example is committed to Air Force use and cannot be made available for the Navy. Fabrication of the system was planned to be completed in 2012, with power, thermal management, beam control, and command-and-control subsystem integration planned through 2013. The system has a weight goal of 5 kg (11 lb) per kW of power. Both services plan for demonstrations in 2014.

General Atomics revealed in April 2015 that its Gen 3 High Energy Laser (HEL) completed beam quality and power measurements tests. The Gen 3 laser has a number of upgrades that provide improved beam quality, increased electrical to optical efficiency, and reduced size and weight; the assembly is small at only 1.3 by 0.4 by 0.5 metres (4.3 ft × 1.3 ft × 1.6 ft), and is powered by a compact Lithium-ion battery to demonstrate deployability on tactical platforms. Beam quality remained constant through the 30-second demonstration, proving that the beam quality of electrically-pumped lasers can be maintained above 50 kilowatts. General Atomics plans to have the laser module deployable on their Avenger unmanned aerial vehicle by 2018. Demonstrating sufficient laser power and beam quality ended the program's laboratory development phase and achieved acceptance for field trials. Ground-based field testing will assess its effects against rockets, mortars, vehicles, and surrogate surface-to-air missiles.

HELLADS was to be tested during summer 2015 at White Sands. General Atomics has also proposed its Gen 3 HEL to the Navy after an ONR solicitation for a 150 kW laser weapon suitable for installation on Arleigh Burke-class destroyers, to be tested in 2018. The company has displayed the laser as a Tactical Laser Weapon Module which includes high-power-density lithium-ion batteries, liquid cooling, one or more laser unit cells, and optics to clean up and stabilize the beam before it enters the beam-director telescope; a unit cell produces a 75 kW beam, and modules can be combined to create beams of 150-300 kW in power with no beam combining like low-power fiber lasers. General Atomics also plans to offer the Gen 3 to the U.S. Army for their High Energy Laser Mobile Demonstrator (HEL-MD) when its power levels increase to 120 kW in the early 2020s.

== See also ==
- Airborne Laser
- Advanced Tactical Laser
- Tactical High Energy Laser
