= Beriev A-60 =

Soviet plane

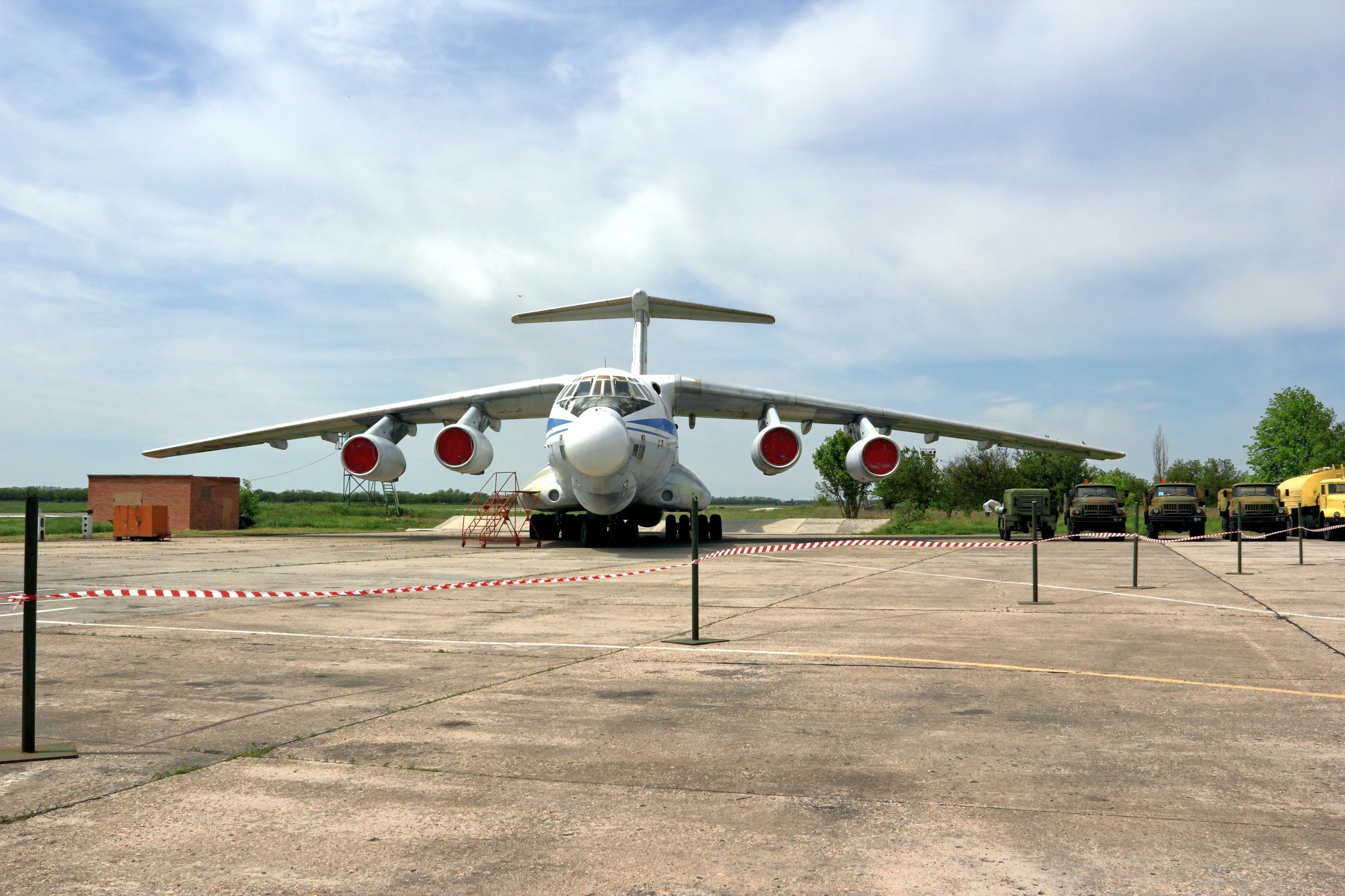
- Beriev A-60 1A2 flying laboratory

General information
- Type: Airborne laser laboratory
- Manufacturer: Beriev
- Status: Destroyed
- Primary users: Russian Aerospace Forces Soviet Air Force
- Number built: 2

History
- First flight: 19 August 1981
- Developed from: Ilyushin Il-76MD

The Beriev A-60 was a Russian airborne laser laboratory aircraft based on the Ilyushin Il-76 transport. It was originally developed in the former Soviet Union for its airborne forces.

In the 1970s, a special aviation complex was established by the Soviets at Taganrog machine-building factory to develop airborne laser technology for the Soviet military.

In 1977, Beriev OKB started the design of a flying laboratory designated 1А. The purpose was to solve the complex scientific and engineering problems regarding the creation of an airborne laser and also to facilitate research on the distribution of beams in the top layers of an atmosphere. Work on this topic occurred with wide cooperation between the enterprises and the scientific organizations of the USSR, but the basic partner OKB was TsKB Almaz, headed by B.V. Bunkin.

== Design and development ==
The Il-76MD was selected as the base aircraft for the flying laboratory. To accommodate the laser, many changes were made to the basic IL-76 design, which drastically changed the appearance of the plane.

- In front, instead of the regular nose cone, it was fitted with a steerable beam-director turret for targeting lidar (twenty years later, Boeing used a similar concept in the YAL-1 test platform, although for the main laser, not targeting).
- A large retractable dorsal turret was installed for main laser firing, as engineers found it impossible to fit the main laser-aiming optics into the nose-cone turret.
- Two large nacelles were installed along the lower edge of the fuselage. One housed the turbo generators used to power the laser, and another replaced the "chin" cabin, housing the targeting lidar's APU.
- The rear cargo doors were removed, although the ramp was retained, as it was a structural element.
- The tail-gunner position was removed.

The problem of accommodating the laser gun was therefore solved, and it did not spoil the aerodynamics of the base aircraft. The laser system was 1 MW, created by one of the branches of the Institute of Atomic Energy, Kurchatov. This carbon-dioxide laser was developed for installation on the IL-76.

The 1A flying laboratory first flew on 19 August 1981 under E.A. Lakhmostov.

In June 1988, the 1A was destroyed by fire at the Chkalovsky test airfield.

On 29 August 1991, the crew led by test pilot V.P. Demyanovskiy flew the second flying laboratory, which received the name 1А2 СССР-86879. A new variant of a laser system was installed as a result of tests on 1А.

Apparently, after being mothballed for more than 15 years, the project was briefly reactivated in May 2009, with eyewitness accounts spotting an A-60 flying in the Rostov on Don and Taganrog regions.

Russia has developed a military airborne laser mounted in a A-60, designated 1LK222 Sokol Eshelon. The second A-60 laboratory can be seen at this reference.

By 2016 the test aircraft RA-86879 had been retired, and was placed on the ramp at Taganrog Airport. However, the Russian Ministry of Defence reported the adoption of unspecified "laser weapons" based on the research that had been conducted. However, in 2020 it was reported that Beriev were exploring options for an upgraded A-60 based on the Il-76MD-90A.

On 25 November 2025, during the Russo-Ukrainian War, the Beriev facilities at Taganrog Airport were reportedly attacked by Ukrainian long-range drones. The last A-60 aircraft was destroyed, and a mothballed Beriev A-100LL was reportedly damaged.

== Former Operators ==
=== Soviet Union ===
- Soviet Air Force

=== Russia ===
- Russian Aerospace Forces

== See also ==
Related development:

- Ilyushin Il-76
- Sokol Eshelon

Comparable aircraft:

- Boeing NC-135
- Boeing YAL-1
