= All gas-phase iodine laser =

All gas-phase iodine laser (AGIL) is a chemical laser using gaseous iodine as a lasing medium. Like the chemical oxygen iodine laser (COIL), it operates at the 1.315 μm wavelength (near-infrared).

== Purpose ==
AGIL was developed in order to eliminate the problems with aqueous chemistry of the COILs. AGIL uses a reaction of chlorine atoms with gaseous hydrazoic acid, resulting in excited molecules of chloronitrene (NCl), which then pass their energy to the iodine atoms much like the singlet oxygen does in COIL. The iodine atoms then emit the laser radiation itself.

== Benefits ==
AGIL has numerous advantages over COIL. The chemicals are all in gaseous phase, therefore easier to work with than liquids, especially in microgravity conditions. The chemicals are also lighter, which is a significant advantage in aerospace applications.

== See also ==
- List of laser articles
