= Omega (laser) =

Soviet anti-aircraft laser development program

Omega (Russian: омега) (1965-) was a Soviet program for developing high-power laser weapons for air defense purposes, similar to the Terra-3 laser. The scientific director of the Omega program was A. M. Prokhorov. Practical work was carried out by Strela Design Bureau, (later - Almaz).

== History ==
Boris Vasilyevich Bunkin (Raspletin's deputy) and his brother Fedor Vasilievich Bunkin (employee of Prokhorov) showed that low-flying targets could be destroyed with a neodymium-emitting glass laser with an active medium volume of approximately 1 square metre (11 sq ft). General Designer of the KB-1 Academician Alexander Andreevich Raspletina and Prokhorov raised the idea before the CPSU Central Committee and the USSR Council of Ministers. The proposal received support in the defense department of CPSU-CC and in the Military-Industrial Commission (MIC) of the USSR Council of Ministers.

On February 23, 1967, a Decree was issued, and on June 26 the MIC signed on. These documents determined the direction of work, the composition of the researchers and the creation of a laser complex, which received the code name "Omega".

The laser energy required to hit an air target was determined the same as the total kinetic energy of a surface-to-air missile warhead, some 10 megajoules.

The laser was based at Sary Shagan testing range.

== Omega Complex ==
In 1972, Omega-2 elements began to be delivered to facility 2506. The laser locator (based on ruby lasers) was put together with a high-power simulator based on neodymium glass lasers. The chief designer was Sukharev Ye. M. at Almaz Central Design Bureau. For the first time, the laser location of the aerodynamic target was carried out, its image was constructed, a target spot was evaluated, the precision of the simulator was estimated, and the effect of the atmosphere on the propagation of laser radiation was investigated. The studies indicated that the project was infeasible.

A new experimental Omega-2M 73T6 complex began, in which a high-power carbon dioxide open type generator with high-power pumping (BGRF) was evaluated. The locator was built on the basis of the television system TOV Karat-2. The chief designer was L.N. Zakharyev, his deputy and Yu. A. Konyaev, the responsible manager of all the works. On September 22, 1982, for the first time in the USSR, a radio-controlled target RUM-2 B was hit by laser radiation. Further tests confirmed the result.

A mobile version of the 74T6 laser complex was developed. However, the device could not surpass the existing ZRK.
