= Boeing YAL-1 =

Airborne laser demonstrator aircraft by Boeing

Coordinates: 32°9′17.4″N 110°50′31″W

YAL-1 Airborne Laser
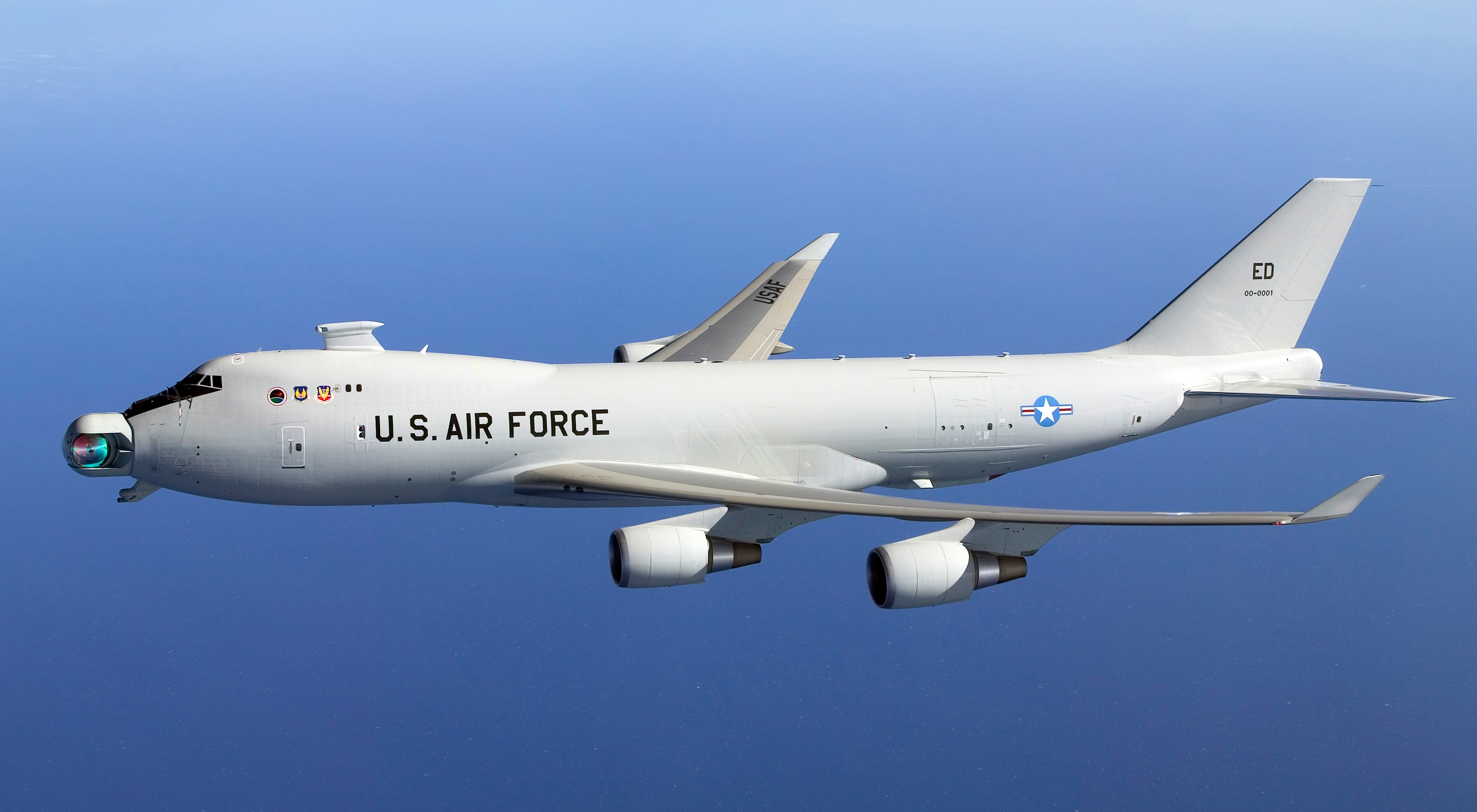
- ABL aircraft during flight

General information
- Type: Airborne Laser (ABL) anti-ballistic missile weapons system
- Manufacturer: Boeing
- Status: Canceled
- Primary user: United States Air Force
- Number built: 1
- Serial: 00-0001

History
- First flight: 18 July 2002
- Retired: 25 September 2014
- Developed from: Boeing 747-400F
- Fate: Scrapped

The Boeing YAL-1 airborne laser testbed was a modified Boeing 747-400F with a megawatt-class chemical oxygen iodine laser (COIL) mounted inside. It was primarily designed to test its feasibility as a missile defense system to destroy tactical ballistic missiles (TBMs) while in boost phase. The aircraft was designated YAL-1A in 2004 by the U.S. Department of Defense.

The YAL-1 with a low-power laser was test-fired in flight at an airborne target in 2007. A high-energy laser was used to intercept a test target in January 2010, and the following month it successfully destroyed two test missiles. Funding for the program was cut in 2010 and the program was canceled in December 2011. It made its final flight on 14 February 2012, to Davis–Monthan Air Force Base near Tucson, Arizona, to be kept in storage at the "boneyard" operated by the 309th Aerospace Maintenance and Regeneration Group. It was ultimately scrapped in September 2014 after all usable parts were removed.

== Development ==
=== Origins ===
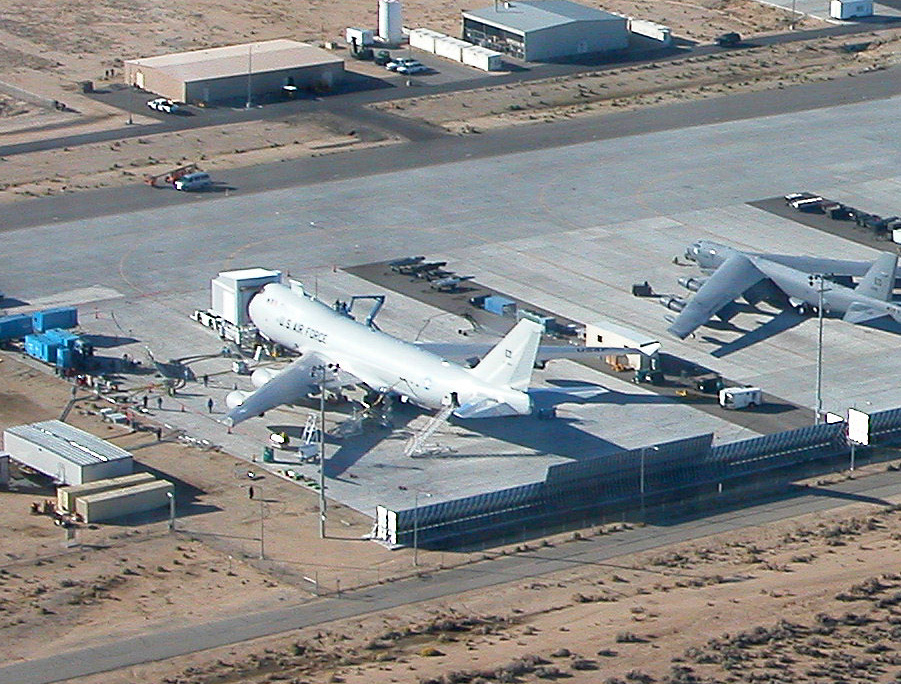
YAL-1 undergoing modification in November 2004, at Edwards AFB

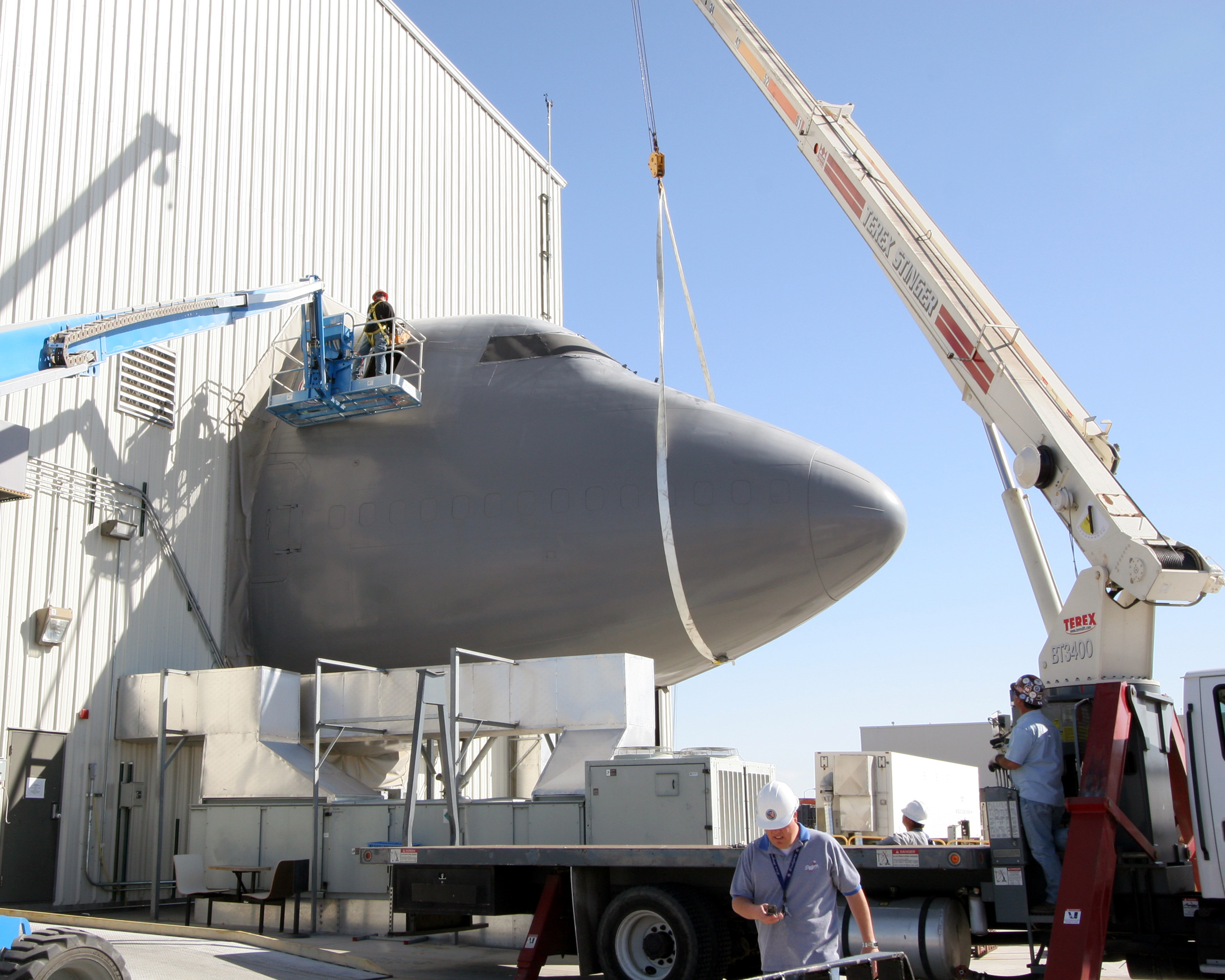
Contractors dismantle the Boeing 747 fuselage portion of the System Integration Laboratory at the Birk Flight Test Center.

The Airborne Laser Laboratory was a less-powerful prototype installed in a Boeing NKC-135A. It shot down several missiles in tests conducted in the 1980s.

The Airborne Laser program was initiated by the US Air Force in 1996 with the awarding of a product definition risk reduction contract to Boeing's ABL team. In 2001, the program was transferred to the U.S. Missile Defense Agency (MDA) and converted to an acquisition program.

The development of the system was being accomplished by a team of contractors. Boeing Defense, Space & Security provides the aircraft, the management team, and the systems integration processes. Northrop Grumman was supplying the COIL, and Lockheed Martin was supplying the nose turret and the fire control system.

In 2001, a retired Air India 747-200 was acquired by the Air Force and trucked without its wings from the Mojave Airport to Edwards Air Force Base where the airframe was incorporated into the System Integration Laboratory (SIL) building at Edwards' Birk Flight Test Center, to be used to fit check and test the various components. The SIL was built primarily to test the COIL at a simulated operational altitude, and during that phase of the program, the laser was operated over 50 times, achieving lasing durations representative of actual operational engagements. These tests fully qualified the system so that it could be integrated into the actual aircraft. Following the completion of the tests, the laboratory was dismantled, and the 747-200 fuselage was removed.

The aircraft was built as a Boeing 747-400F freighter at the Boeing Everett Factory with manufacturer's serial number 30201 and fuselage line number 1238. The aircraft took its first flight on 6 January 2000. It was shortly thereafter delivered to Boeing Defense, Space & Security in Wichita, Kansas for initial conversion for military use. The aircraft took to the skies again on 18 July 2002. Ground testing of the chemical oxygen iodine laser (COIL) resulted in its successful firing in 2004. The YAL-1 was assigned to the 417th Flight Test Squadron Airborne Laser Combined Test Force at Edwards AFB.

=== Testing ===
Besides the COIL, the system also included two kilowatt-class Target Illuminator Lasers for target tracking. On 15 March 2007, the YAL-1 successfully fired this laser in flight, hitting its target. The target was an NC-135E Big Crow test aircraft that has been specially modified with a "signboard" target on its fuselage. The test validated the system's ability to track an airborne target and measure and compensate for atmospheric distortion.

The next phase in the test program involved the "surrogate high-energy laser" (SHEL), a stand-in for the COIL, and demonstrated the transition from target illumination to simulated weapons firing. The COIL system was installed in the aircraft and was undergoing ground testing by July 2008.

In an 6 April 2009 press conference, the Secretary of Defense Robert Gates recommended the cancellation of the planned second ABL aircraft and said that the program should return to a Research and Development effort. "The ABL program has significant affordability and technology problems and the program's proposed operational role is highly questionable," Gates said in making the recommendation.

There was a test launch off the California coast on 6 June 2009. At that time it was anticipated that the new Airborne Laser Aircraft could be ready for operation by 2013 after a successful test. On 13 August 2009, the first in-flight test of the YAL-1 culminated with a successful firing of the SHEL at an instrumented test missile.

On 18 August 2009 the high-energy laser aboard the aircraft successfully fired in flight for the first time. The YAL-1 took off from Edwards Air Force Base and fired its high-energy laser while flying over the California High Desert. The laser was fired into an onboard calorimeter, which captured the beam and measured its power.

In January 2010, the high-energy laser was used in-flight to intercept, although not destroy, a test Missile Alternative Range Target Instrument (MARTI) in the boost phase of flight. On 11 February 2010, in a test at Point Mugu Naval Air Warfare Center-Weapons Division Sea Range off the central California coast, the system successfully destroyed a liquid-fuel boosting ballistic missile. Less than an hour after that first missile had been destroyed, a second missile—a solid-fuel design—had, as announced by the MDA, been "successfully engaged", but not destroyed, and that all test criteria had been met. The MDA announcement also noted that ABL had destroyed an identical solid-fuel missile in flight eight days earlier. This test was the first time that a directed-energy system destroyed a ballistic missile in any phase of flight. It was later reported that the first 11 February engagement required 50% less dwell time than expected to destroy the missile, the second engagement on the solid-fuel missile, less than an hour later, had to be cut short before it could be destroyed because of a "beam misalignment" problem.

=== Cancellation ===
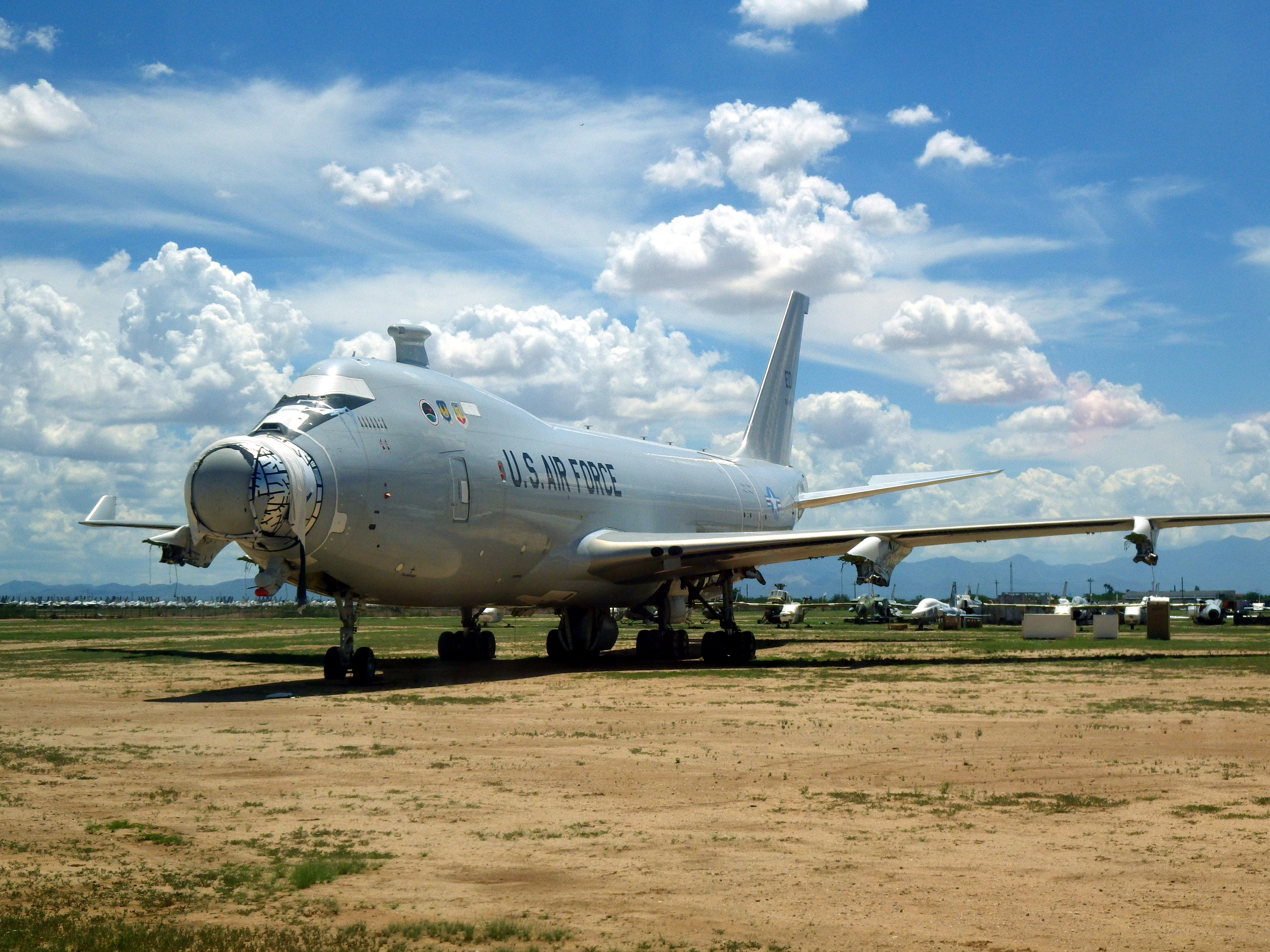
In storage with engines removed. Ultimately broken up on 25 September 2014.

Secretary of Defense Gates summarized fundamental concerns with the practicality of the program concept:

I don't know anybody at the Department of Defense, Mr. Tiahrt, who thinks that this program should, or would, ever be operationally deployed. The reality is that you would need a laser something like 20 to 30 times more powerful than the chemical laser in the plane right now to be able to get any distance from the launch site to fire ... So, right now the ABL would have to orbit inside the borders of Iran in order to be able to try and use its laser to shoot down that missile in the boost phase. And if you were to operationalize this you would be looking at 10 to 20 747s, at a billion and a half dollars apiece, and $100 million a year to operate. And there's nobody in uniform that I know who believes that this is a workable concept.

The Air Force did not request further funds for the Airborne Laser for 2010; Air Force Chief of Staff Schwartz has said that the system "does not reflect something that is operationally viable".

In December 2011, it was reported that the project was to be ended after 16 years of development and a cost of over US$5 billion. While in its current form, a relatively low power laser mounted on an unprotected airliner may not be a practical or defensible weapon, the YAL-1 testbed is considered to have proven that air mounted energy weapons with increased range and power could be another viable way of destroying otherwise very difficult to intercept sub-orbital ballistic missiles and rockets. On 12 February 2012, the YAL-1 flew its final flight and landed at Davis-Monthan AFB, Arizona, where it was placed in storage at the "boneyard" operated by the 309th Aerospace Maintenance and Regeneration Group until it was ultimately scrapped in September 2014 after all usable parts were removed.

As of 2013, studies were underway to apply the lessons of the YAL-1 by mounting laser anti-missile defenses on unmanned combat aerial vehicles that could fly above the altitude limits of the converted jetliner.

By 2015, the Missile Defense Agency had started efforts to deploy a laser on a high-altitude UAV. Rather than a manned jetliner containing chemical fuels flying at 40,000 feet (12 km), firing a megawatt laser from a range of "tens of kilometers" at a boost-phase missile, the new concept envisioned an unmanned aircraft carrying an electric laser flying at 65,000 feet (20 km), firing the same power level at targets potentially up to "hundreds of kilometers" away for survivability against air defenses. While the ABL's laser required 55 kg (121 lb) to generate one kW, the MDA wanted to reduce that to 2–5 kg (4.4–11.0 lb) per kW, totaling 5,000 lb (2,300 kg) for a megawatt. Unlike the ABL, which required its crew to rest and chemical fuel to be reloaded, an electric laser would need only power generating from fuel to fire, so a UAV with in-flight refueling could have near-inexhaustible endurance and armament. A "low-power demonstrator" was planned to fly sometime in or around 2021. Challenges in reaching required power levels on a platform with sufficient performance led to the MDA choosing not to pursue the concept.

== Design ==
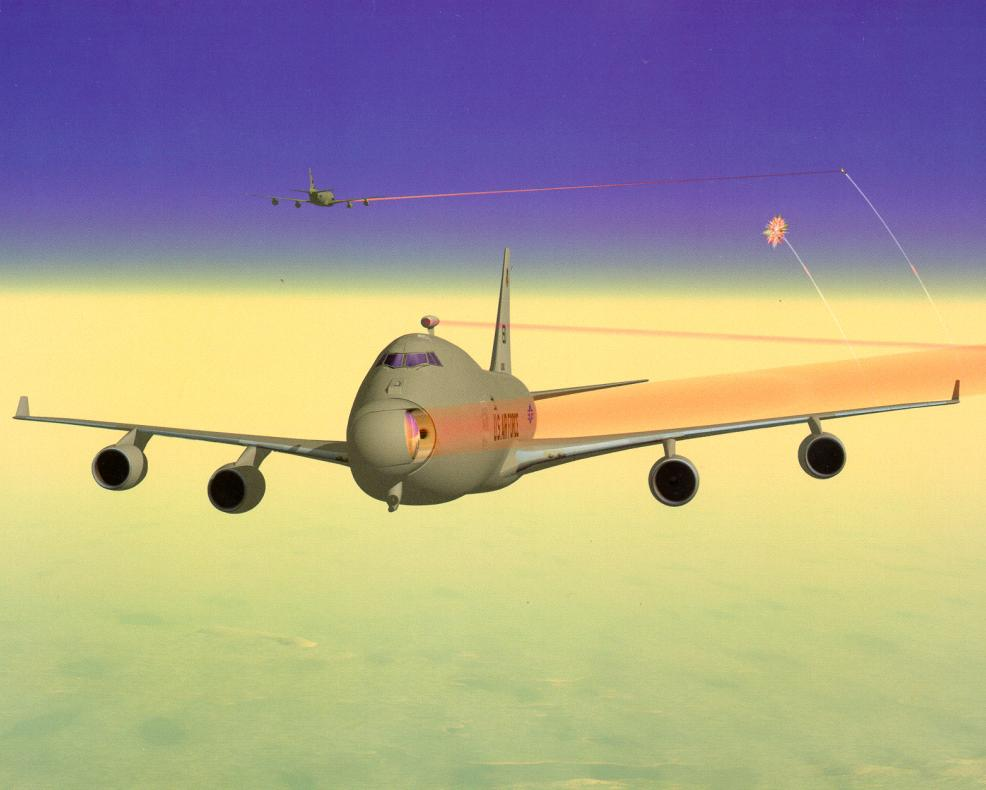
Artist impression of two YAL-1As shooting down ballistic missiles. The laser beams are highlighted red for visibility. (In reality, they would be invisible to the naked eye.)

=== COIL ===
The heart of the system was the COIL, comprising six interconnected modules, each as large as an SUV. Each module weighed about 6,500 pounds (3,000 kg). When fired, the laser used enough energy in a five-second burst to power a typical American household for more than an hour.

=== Use against ICBMs vs TBMs ===
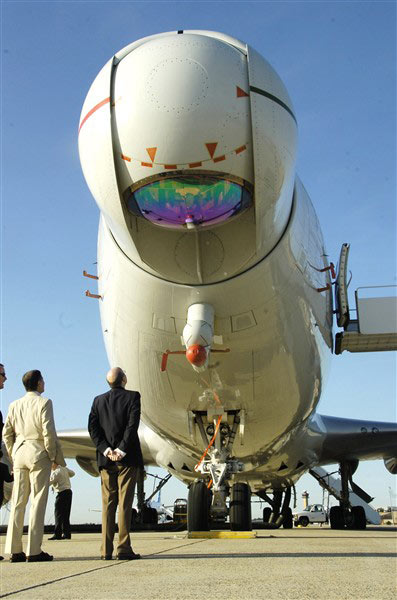
Laser turret, said by the US Air Force to be the world's largest.

The ABL was designed for use against tactical ballistic missiles (TBMs). These have a shorter range and fly more slowly than ICBMs. The MDA had suggested the ABL might be used against ICBMs during their boost phase. This could require much longer flights to get in position, and might not be possible without flying over hostile territory. Liquid-fueled ICBMs, which have thinner skins, and remain in boost phase longer than TBMs, might be easier to destroy.

If the ABL had achieved its design goals, it could have destroyed liquid-fueled ICBMs up to 600 km away. Tougher solid-fueled ICBM destruction range would likely have been limited to 300 km, too short to be useful in many scenarios, according to a 2003 report by the American Physical Society on National Missile Defense.

=== Intercept sequence ===
The ABL system used infrared sensors for initial missile detection. After initial detection, three low-power tracking lasers calculated missile course, speed, aimpoint, and air turbulence. Air turbulence deflects and distorts lasers. The ABL adaptive optics use the turbulence measurement to compensate for atmospheric errors. The main laser, located in a turret on the aircraft nose, could be fired for 3 to 5 seconds, causing the missile to break up in flight near the launch area. The ABL was not designed to intercept TBMs in the terminal or descending flight phase. Thus, the ABL would have had to be within a few hundred kilometers of the missile launch point. All of this would have occurred in approximately 8 to 12 seconds.

=== Operational considerations ===
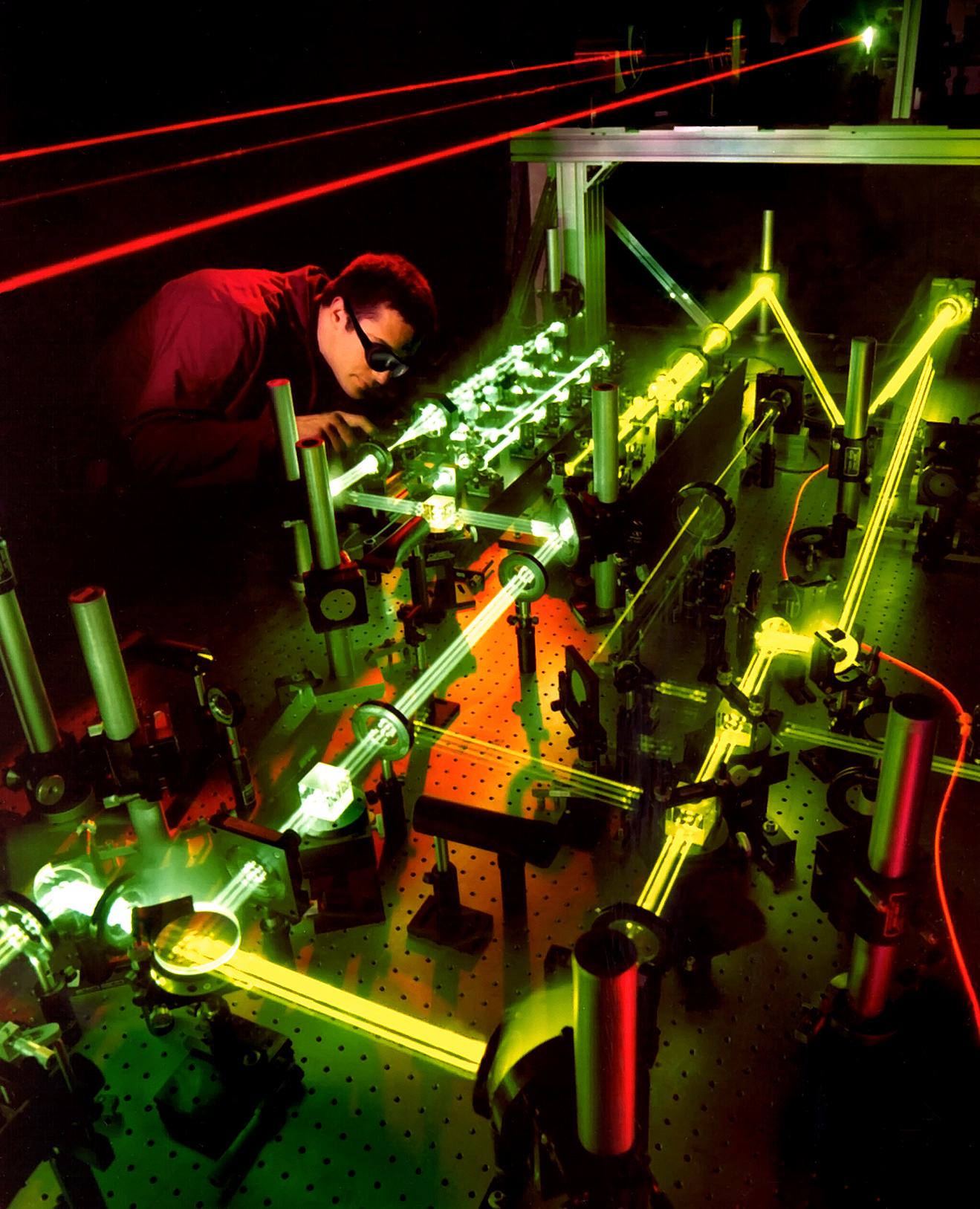
A technician evaluates the interaction of multiple lasers for use aboard the Airborne Laser.

The ABL did not burn through or disintegrate its target. It heated the missile skin, weakening it, causing failure from high-speed flight stress. The laser used chemical fuel similar to rocket propellant to generate the high laser power. Plans called for each 747 to carry enough laser fuel for about 20 shots, or perhaps as many as 40 low-power shots against fragile TBMs. To refuel the laser, YAL-1 would have to land. The aircraft itself could have been refueled in flight, which would have enabled it to stay aloft for long periods. Preliminary operational plans called for the ABL to be escorted by fighters and possibly electronic warfare aircraft. The ABL aircraft would likely have had to orbit near potential launch sites (located in hostile countries) for long periods, flying a figure-eight pattern that allows the aircraft to keep the laser aimed toward the missiles.

=== Use against other targets ===
In theory, an airborne laser could be used against hostile fighter aircraft, cruise missiles, or even low-Earth-orbit satellites (see anti-satellite weapon). However, the YAL-1 infrared target acquisition system was designed to detect the hot exhaust of TBMs in boost phase. Satellites and other aircraft have a much lower heat signature, making them more difficult to detect. Aside from the difficulty of acquiring and tracking a different kind of target, ground targets such as armored vehicles and possibly even aircraft are not fragile enough to be damaged by a megawatt-class laser.

An analysis by the Union of Concerned Scientists discusses potential airborne laser use against low Earth orbit satellites. Another program, the Advanced Tactical Laser, envisions air-to-ground use of a megawatt-class laser mounted on an aircraft better suited for low altitude flight.

== Operator ==
United States

- United States Air Force
  - 417th Flight Test Squadron - Edwards AFB, California

== Specifications ==
Data from

General characteristics

- Crew: 6
- Length: 231 ft 8 in (70.6 m)
- Wingspan: 211 ft 3 in (64.4 m)
- Height: 63 ft 8 in (19.4 m)
- Airfoil: root: BAC 463 to BAC 468; tip: BAC 469 to BAC 474
- Max takeoff weight: 875,000 lb (396,893 kg)
- Powerplant: 4 × General Electric CF6-80C2B5F turbofan engines, 62,000 lbf (276 kN) thrust each

Performance

- Maximum speed: 547.5 kn (630.1 mph, 1,014.0 km/h) at 35,000 ft (11,000 m)
- Cruise speed: 499.5 kn (574.8 mph, 925.1 km/h) at 35,000 ft (11,000 m)

Armament

- 1 × COIL (Chemical oxygen iodine laser)

Avionics

- 1 × ABL infrared detector system
- 2 × Target Illuminator lasers

== See also ==
- Advanced Tactical Laser
- High Energy Liquid Laser Area Defense System
- Tactical High Energy Laser

Related development

- Boeing 747
- Boeing 747-400

Aircraft of comparable role, configuration, and era

- Beriev A-60
- Boeing NKC-135A

Related lists

- List of laser articles
- List of military aircraft of the United States
