= Priozersk, Kazakhstan =

Priozersk Priozersk
- closed city
- Location in Karagandy Province, Kazakhstan
- Coordinates: 46°01′51″N 73°42′07″E
- Country: Kazakhstan
- Region: Karaganda Region
- Founded: 1956

Government
  - Akim: Nurlan Lambekov

Area
  - Total: 54.5 km^{2} (21.0 sq mi)

Population (2009)
  - Total: 13,479
  - Summer (DST): UTC+6 (UTC+6)
- Postal code: 101100
- Area code: +7 71039

Priozersk is a closed city located on the northern shores of Lake Balkhash, Kazakhstan. It serves as the administrative center of Sary Shagan anti-ballistic missile testing site.

Priozersk is located in Karaganda Region (central Kazakhstan), approximately 620 kilometers to the south-east of the Karaganda and 747 kilometers from Astana. The Cambala Airport lies in the suburbs.

Population: 13,479 (2009 census results); 11,033 (1999 census results). By nationality, the city is 46% Russian, 39% Kazakh, 6% Ukrainian, and 9% other. The town is closed to visits by foreign citizens.

== History ==
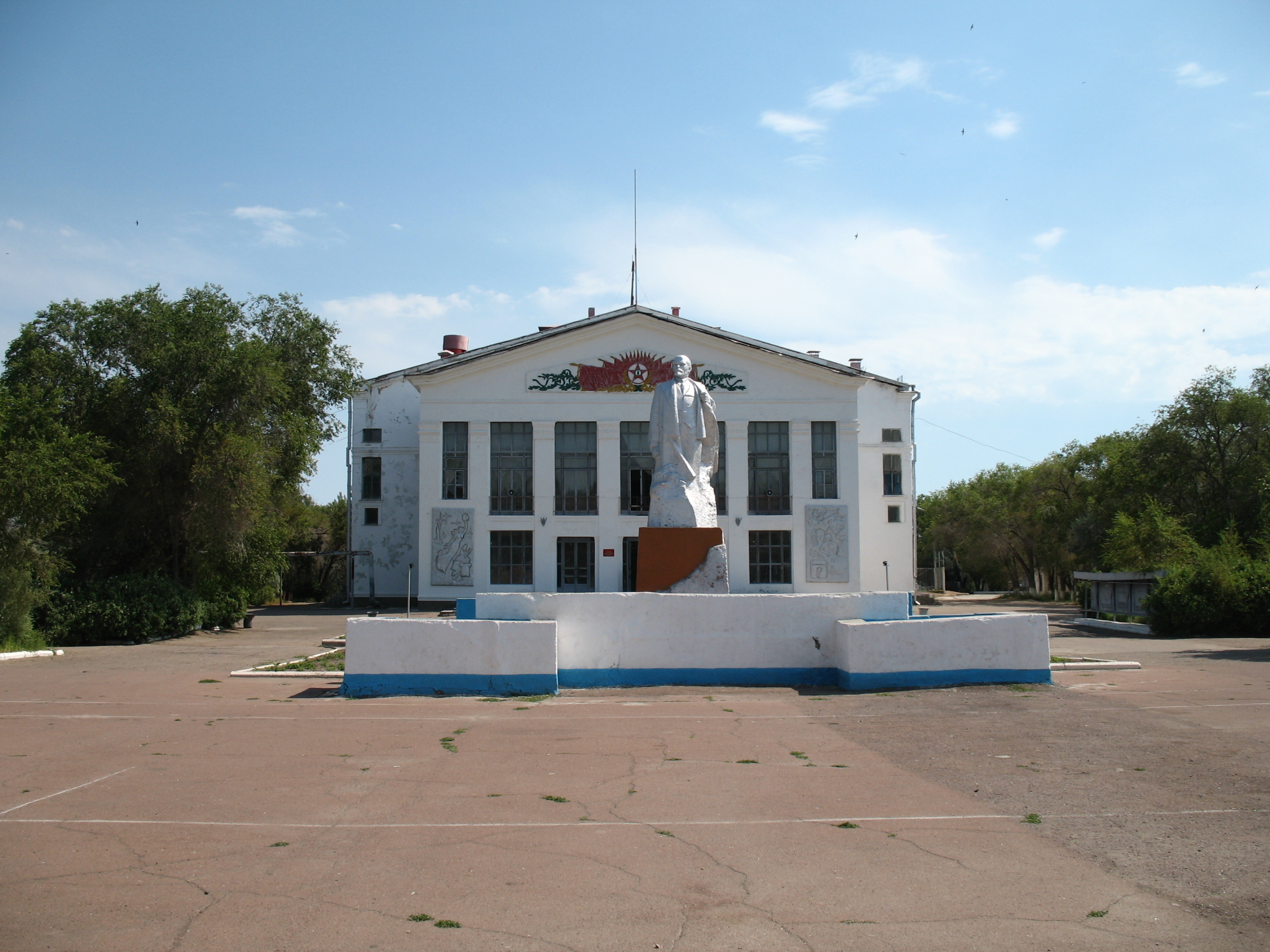
Central Square in Priozersk

Tens of thousands of workers and hundreds of missile experts and army officers arrived after the Soviet government decided to establish a secret military base in the Kazakh Steppe. This testing site for the Soviet missile defense system was one of such centers, which had led to construction of anti-ballistic missiles and to attain parity in the arms race between the USSR and United States.

After the Soviet Union's collapse, the Russian Federation agreed with Kazakhstan to lease some military units for 50 years. The Russian Army continues to use the base at Priozersk as the testing site for improving anti-ballistic and anti-aircraft defense systems.

== Climate ==
According to the Köppen-Geiger climate classification system, the city of Priozersk has a steppe climate/cold semi-arid climate (BSk).

Climate data for Priozersk
Month	Jan	Feb	Mar	Apr	May	Jun	Jul	Aug	Sep	Oct	Nov	Dec	Year
Mean daily maximum °C (°F)	−2 (28)	0 (32)	7 (45)	16 (61)	22 (72)	26 (79)	30 (86)	29 (84)	23 (73)	16 (61)	6 (43)	1 (34)	15 (58)
Daily mean °C (°F)	−7 (19)	−5 (23)	2 (36)	11 (52)	17 (63)	21 (70)	24 (75)	22.5 (72.5)	17 (63)	10 (50)	1 (34)	−4.5 (23.9)	9.1 (48.4)
Mean daily minimum °C (°F)	−12 (10)	−10 (14)	−3 (27)	5 (41)	11 (52)	15 (59)	17 (63)	16 (61)	11 (52)	4 (39)	−4 (25)	−10 (14)	3 (38)
Average precipitation mm (inches)	26 (1.0)	32 (1.3)	64 (2.5)	89 (3.5)	99 (3.9)	59 (2.3)	35 (1.4)	23 (0.9)	25 (1.0)	46 (1.8)	48 (1.9)	32 (1.3)	578 (22.8)
Average precipitation days (≥ 0.1 mm)	9	9	12	11	12	10	9	6	5	7	10	9	109
Average relative humidity (%)	74	74	73	59	55	51	45	44	45	55	70	74	60
Mean daily sunshine hours	3.7	4.2	4.5	6.5	7.8	9.4	10.2	9.5	8.3	6.4	4.3	3.6	6.5
Source: climatemps.com
