= Sary Shagan =

Missile defence test site in Kazakhstan

- Сары-Шаган
- Near Priozersk in Kazakhstan
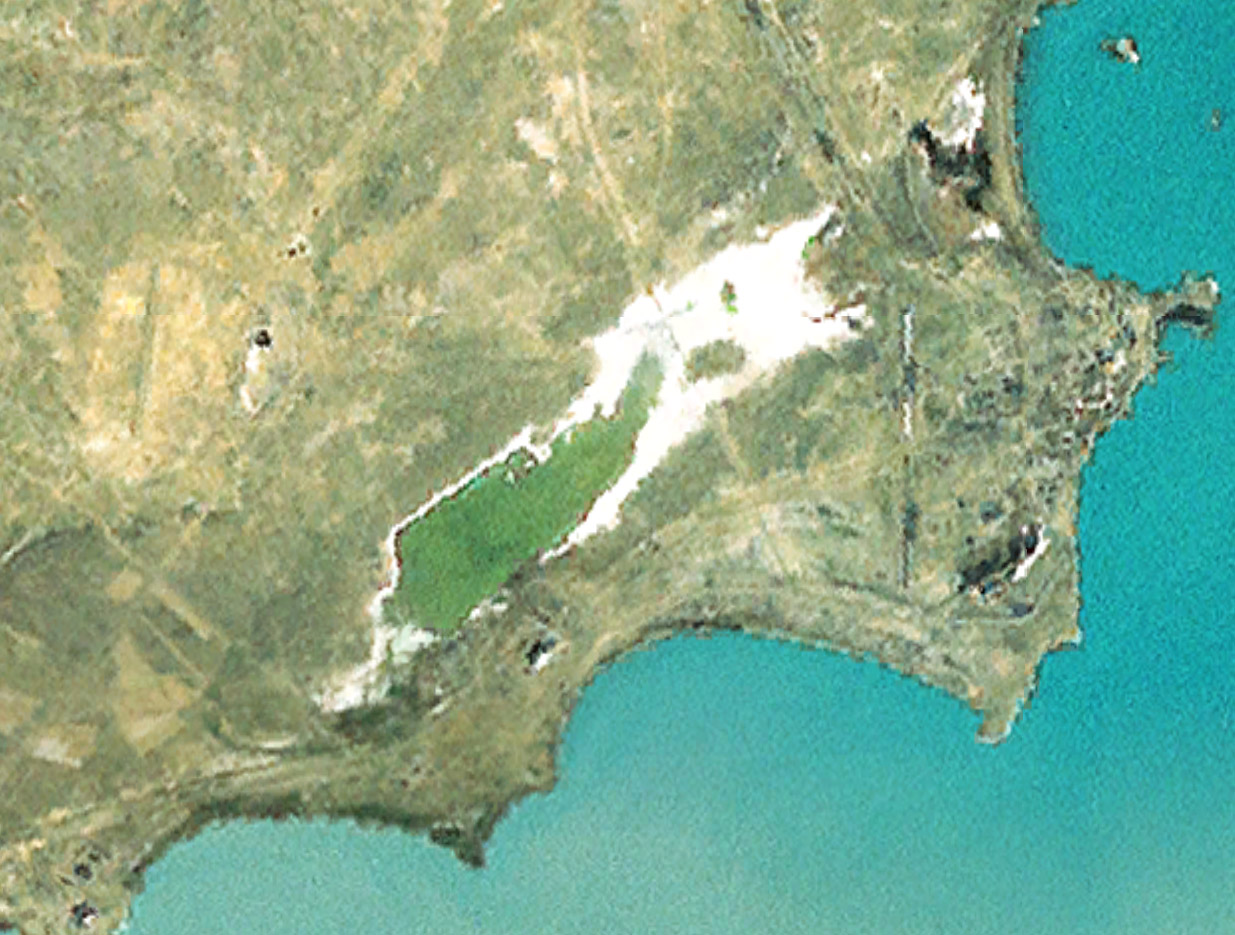
- Balkhash-9 radar station at Sary Shagan

Site information
- Type: Anti-ballistic missile testing range
- Operator: Russian Aerospace Forces
- Status: active

Location
- Sary Shagan (Kazakhstan) Sary Shagan (Asia)
- Coordinates: 46°23′N 72°52′E

Site history
- In use: 1958 - current

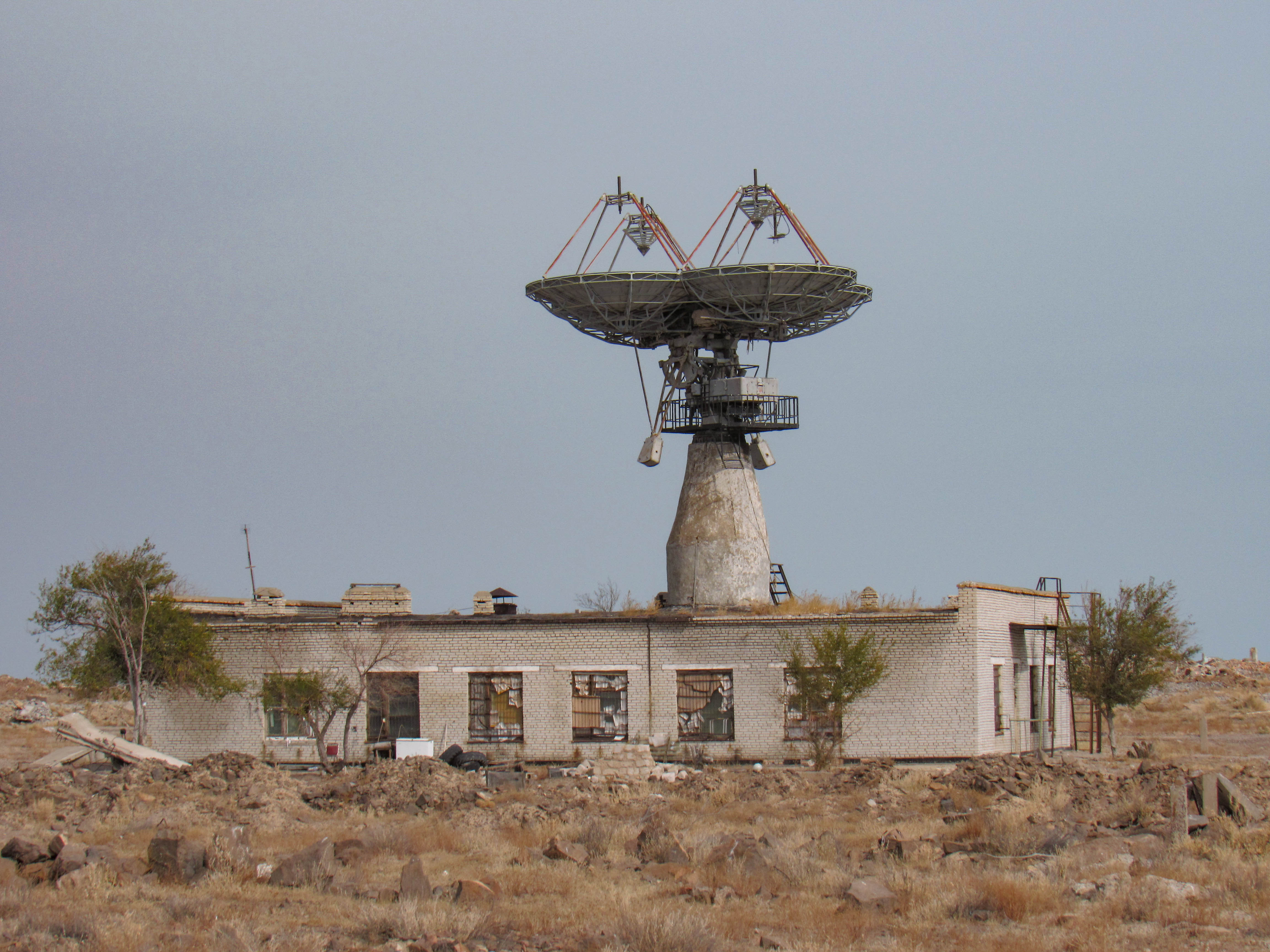
Ground facilities

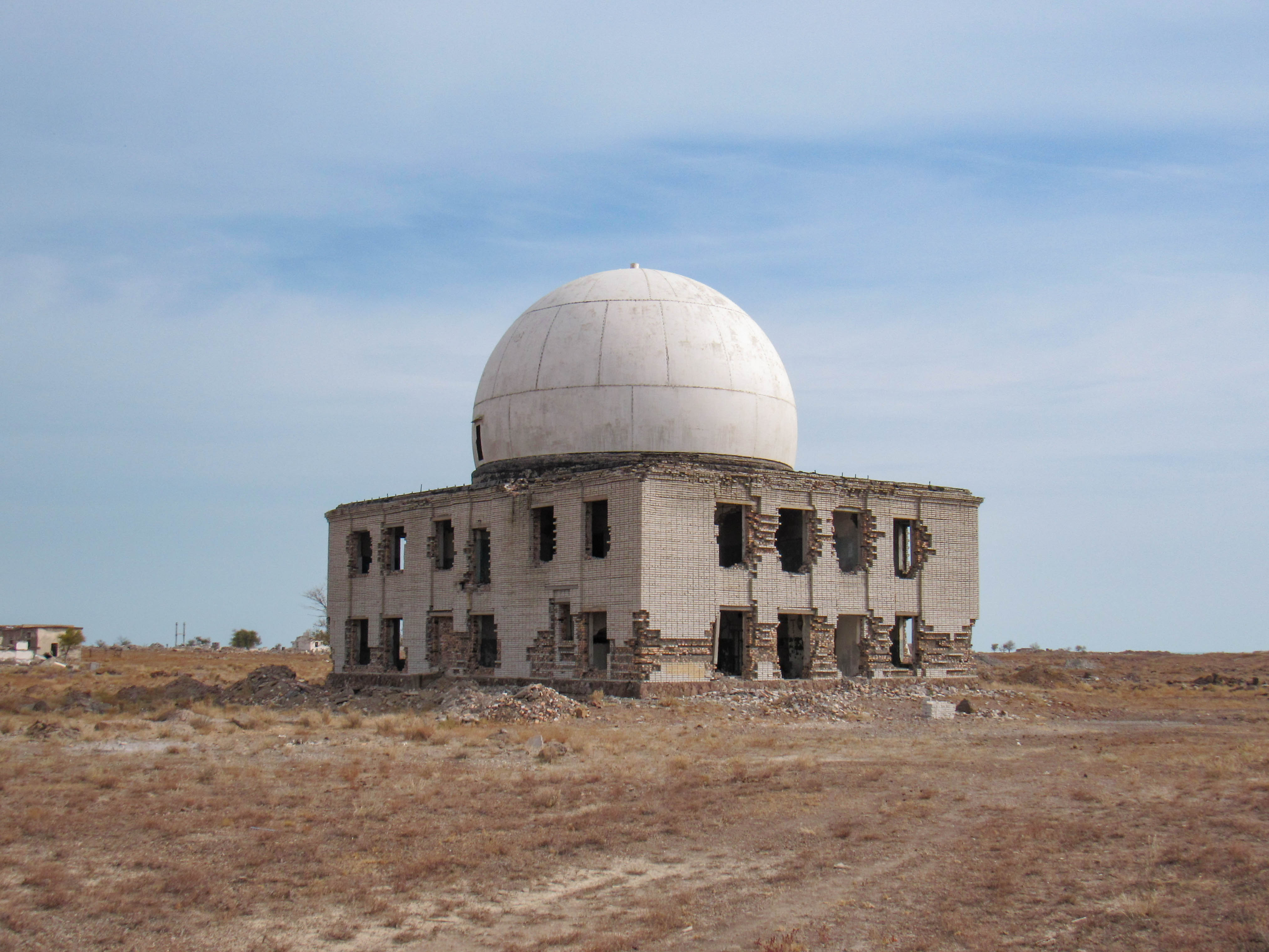
Communication tower

Sary Shagan (Russian: Сары-Шаган; Kazakh: Сарышаған) is an anti-ballistic missile testing range located in Kazakhstan.

On 17 August 1956 the Council of Ministers of the Soviet Union authorized plans for an experimental facility for missile defence located at Sary Shagan, on the west bank of Lake Balkhash. The first missile launched from the facility was a V-1000 on 16 October 1958, but the facilities for full-scale testing were not ready until 1961. Sary Shagan remains in use, with the latest known launch on 2 December 2022. The town of Sary Shagan was a closed city until 2005. The administrative centre, Priozersk remained a closed city.

The length of the site is 480 km.

The Sary Shagan range was the intended landing site for the sample return canister of the Russian Fobos-Grunt mission.

== History ==
The first and only one in Eurasia test site for the development and testing of anti-missile weapons. In USSR, the official name of the test site was State Research and Testing Site No. 10 USSR Ministry of Defense. The test site occupied 81,200 km^{2} (including 49,200 km^{2} in the Karaganda region Kazakh SSR).

The construction of the test site and the city began in 1956 in connection with the development of a missile defense system called System A. The main criteria for selecting a site for the test site, like when creating the Kapustin Yar and NIIP-5 rocket ranges (Baikonur), were the presence of sparsely populated lowland woodland, a large number of cloudless days, and the lack of valuable farmland. Marshal Nedelin recalled:

This is a very harsh desert region, uninhabited, unsuitable for grazing flocks. Stony barren and waterless desert. But the main dwelling of the missile defense ground can be tied to Lake Balkhash. It has fresh, though harsh, water, and the town will be blissful if you can apply this word to the desert.

— Kisunko GV Secret zone: Confession of the general designer. – M.: Sovremennik, 1996.

On June 9, 1960, and at the test site General Designer OKB-301 S. A. Lavochkin died of a heart attack (during the test of the air defense system “Dal”).

On March 4, 1961, for the first time in the world a ballistic missile warhead was hit by an experimental complex missile defense System A (missile defense) at the test site.

In October 1961 and October 1962, five nuclear explosions at altitudes from 80 km to 300 km were carried out over the test site during Soviet Project K nuclear tests.

July 15, 1966 and by the Decree of the Presidium of the Supreme Soviet of the USSR, the test site was awarded the Order of Lenin for successfully completing the tasks of developing and mastering new military equipment.

On April 20, 1981, the test site (10 GNIIP Air Defense Forces) was awarded the Order of the Red Star.

All Soviet and Russian complexes PRO and air defense long-range, many promising radar, experimental complexes based on combat laser high power (including the program “ Terra”, “Omega”).

In total, the following was tested at the test site: 6 antimissile systems; 12 anti-aircraft missile systems; 7 types of anti-missile; 12 types of anti-aircraft guided missiles; 14 types of measuring equipment; 18 radar systems and several systems on new physical principles. Testing of 15 strategic missile systems and their modifications is provided.

In 1998, the Sary-Shagan test site was withdrawn from the troops AD and reassigned to 4th State Central Interspecific Test Site (administered by the Strategic Rocket Forces).

== Current status ==
In the 1990s, most of the test site facilities were decommissioned and abandoned; in subsequent years, they were looted by marauders, and the equipment was dismantled.

As of 2014, due to the controversial legal status of abandoned test sites, these territories have not been cleaned up: they are cluttered with the remnants of buildings and structures, and are polluted by military waste. After the proclamation in 1991 of the independence of Kazakhstan, its sovereignty extends to the test site. In 1996, an agreement was signed between the Government of the Russian Federation and the Government of the Republic of Kazakhstan on the lease of the Sary-Shagan testing ground, under which Russia leased part of the test site area. The areas to which the rent did not apply were transferred to the use of the Republic of Kazakhstan. However, no specific steps have been taken, the property has not yet been taken to the balance of the relevant departments of Kazakhstan.

The territory of the test site is not protected. In practice, the site is open to all who wish to visit it. There are no designations of the boundaries of the test site, no information signs and shields on which it would be explained what the risk of unauthorized visitors to the site and the responsibility they may incur for it. To obtain the same official permission, subject to the availability of all the necessary documents, it takes many months. Without any permits at the site, the local population earns a living by collecting scrap and "mining" building materials.

Media reported several cases of the discovery of remnants of weapons by the population, for example, those found in 2005 in abandoned barrels with napalm (the Soviet military name is “ognesmes”).

In connection with the collapse of the Soviet defence industry and in connection with the reduction of Russian missile defense programs and FFP since the late 1990s, missile tests at the test site have been performed only once or twice a year . In particular, in December 2010 and training exercises were conducted with a Topol rocket. The military units of the Ministry of Defense of Kazakhstan.

From 2005, entry into the city of Priozersk is carried out without a permit. Until 2009, the Kazakhstan Road police at security checkpoint KPP recorded the time of entry, the model of the car, and state number; since 2009, the data of the majority of cars entering are not recorded.

24 October 2012 and a conditional target at the test site destroyed a prototype of a new Russian ballistic missile with a mobile launcher RS-26, launched from Kapustin Yar in Astrakhan areas Russia.

On 4 March 2014, the RS-12M Topol intercontinental ballistic missile launched from Kapustin Yar test site in Astrakhan Region Russia struck a training target at the test site.

In 2016, the Russian-Kazakh agreement was ratified, which established new boundaries of the landfill, excluding some sections.

At the beginning of 2017, the modernization of the experimental test base of the test site began. The ground-based optical-electronic systems "Beret-M", optical-electronic stations of the trajectory-measuring complex "OES TIK", optical-electronic stations "Sazhen-TM", receiving antenna complexes were delivered.

On 2 December 2022 the Russian army announced that they had successfully tested a new missile defence system in Sary Shagan.

== Other notable military complexes on site ==
In the 1970s the Vympel NPO, Geofizika, Phazotron, MNIIRE Altair, others; built the Terra-3 laser testing centre at Sary Shagan.

== Radar site ==
The Sary Shagan site has hosted a number of radar prototypes such as the Don-2NP. Also there is Balkhash-9 radar station a few km away which started in the 1960s and functioned as part of the Russian missile warning network until 2020.

=== References in Fiction ===
- The Sary Shagan site is one of the USSR ABM/SDI sites featured in the Tom Clancy novel The Cardinal of the Kremlin.
- The site is mentioned in the manga 'Battle Angel Alita' in reference to a supposedly historical weapon, a 'scalar field' device called the 'Sarishagan tiger'.
