= ElectricOIL =

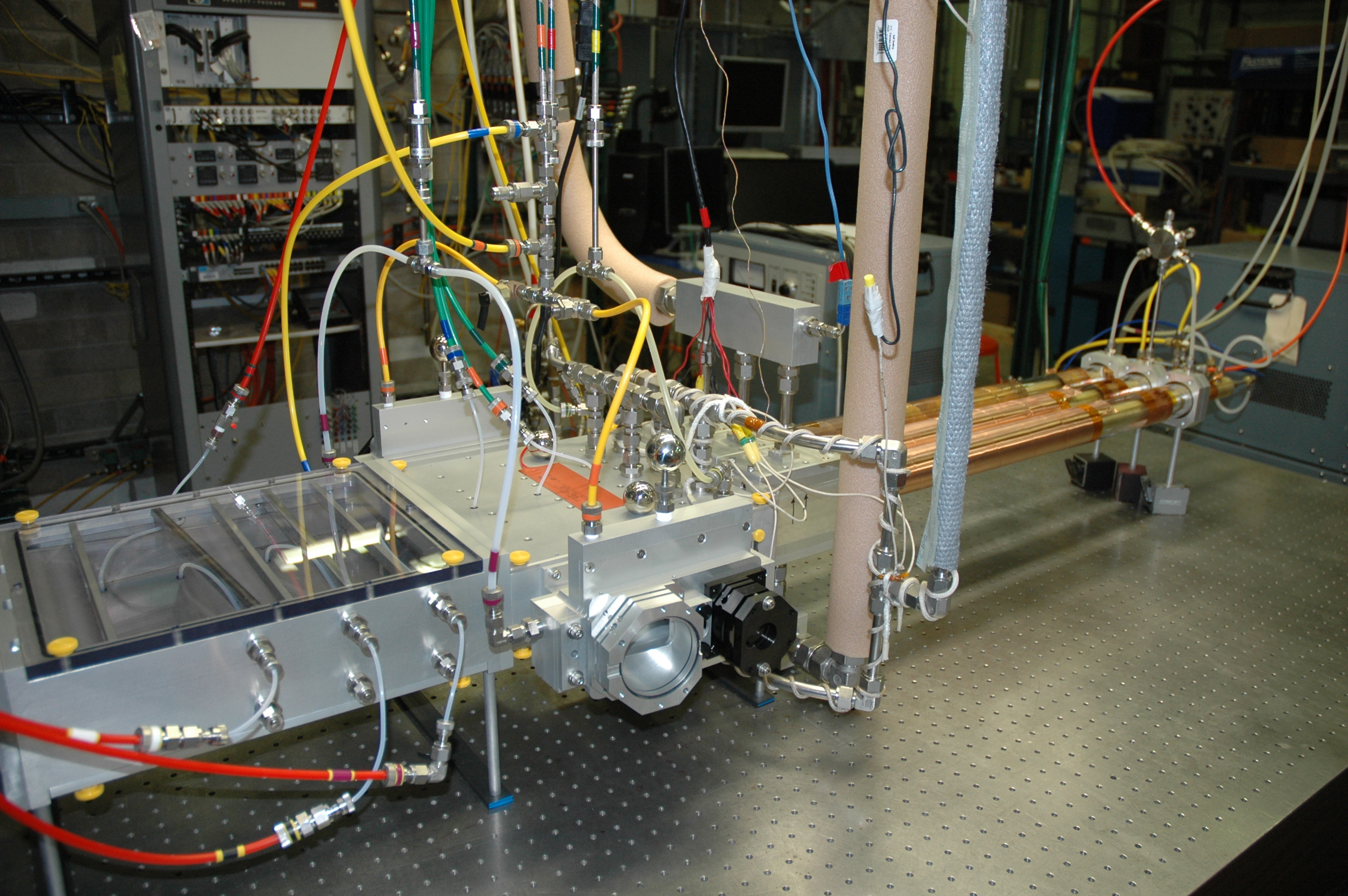
500W EOIL Device

The Electric Oxygen Iodine Laser, or ElectricOIL, or EOIL, is an infrared hybrid electrical / chemical laser. Its output wavelength is 1.315 μm, the wavelength of transition of atomic iodine. The lasing state I* is produced by near-resonant energy transfer with metastable singlet oxygen O_{2}(a^{1}Δ) [denoted hereafter as O_{2}(a)].

== Advantages ==
EOIL technology represents a unique class of hybrid electric gas high-energy laser with the potential to have inherently higher beam quality than solid state systems, while being more logistically friendly than current Chemical Oxygen Iodine Laser (COIL) systems. The principal advantage of such an inherently high beam quality system is the trade of a relatively small fixed mass in electrical generation and heat exchanger hardware for the massive fluid supply and large tankage associated with COIL devices.

== Development ==
Since the first reporting of a viable electric discharge-driven oxygen-iodine laser system (also often referred to as EOIL or DOIL in the literature) by CU Aerospace (CUA) and the University of Illinois at Urbana Champaign (UIUC), there have been some other successful demonstrations of gain and laser power. Computational modeling of the discharge and post-discharge kinetics has been an invaluable tool in EOIL development, allowing analysis of the production of various discharge species [O_{2}(a^{1}Δ), O_{2}(_{b}^{1}Σ), O atoms, and O_{3}] and determination of the influence of NO_{X} species on system kinetics. Ionin et al. and Heaven provide comprehensive topical reviews of discharge production of O_{2}(a) and various EOIL studies. The highest gain in an EOIL device reported to date is 0.30% / cm, and the highest output power reported is 538 W. Over the past five years of research and development of the EOIL device, higher performance and efficiency have been consistently obtained by moving towards higher operating flow rates and pressures.
