= Advanced Tactical Laser =

Experimental U.S. military program

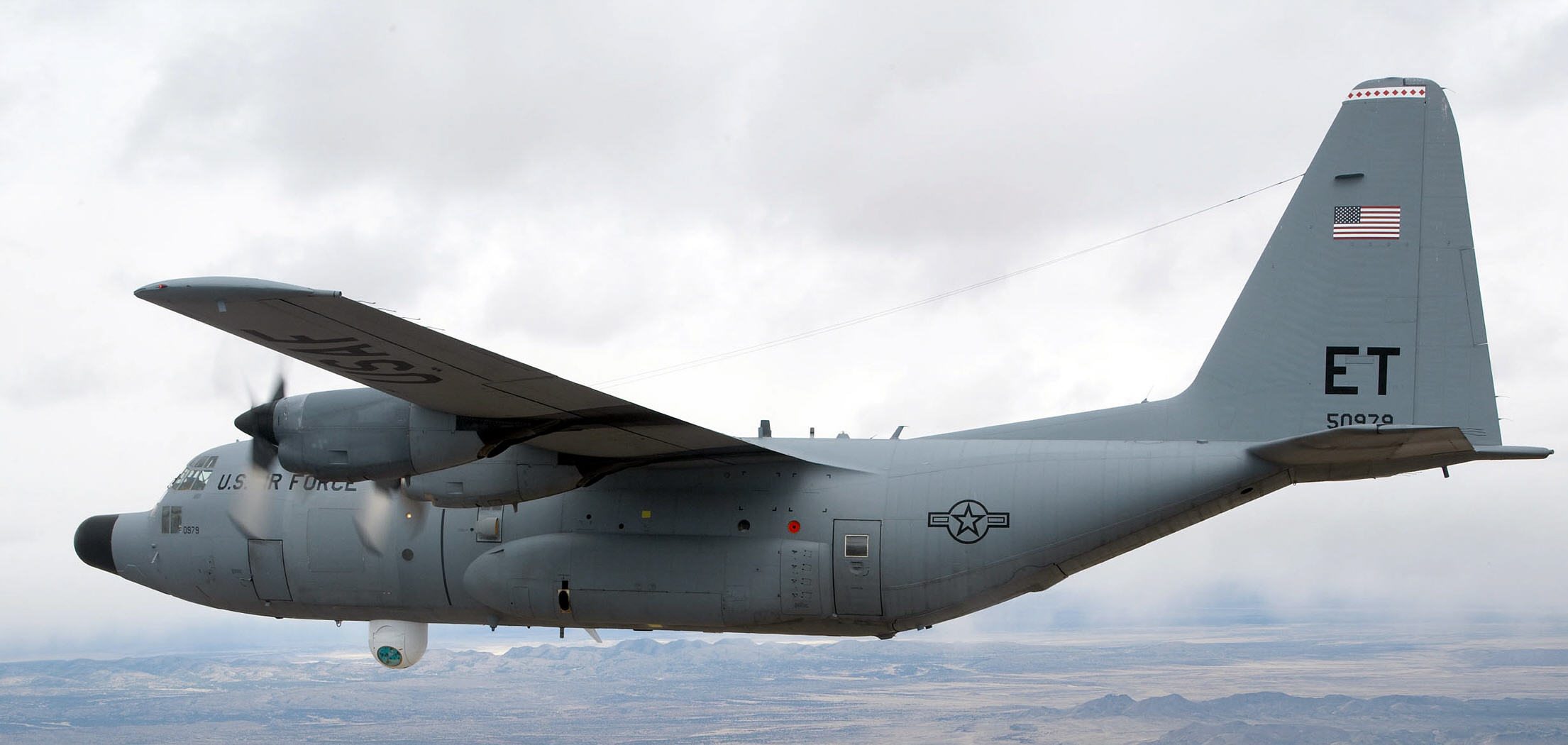
C-130 Hercules with Advanced Tactical Laser on board

The Advanced Tactical Laser (ATL) program was a US military program to mount a high energy laser weapon on an aircraft, initially the AC-130 gunship, for use against ground targets in urban or other areas where minimizing collateral damage is important. The laser was a 100 kilowatt-class chemical oxygen iodine laser (COIL). It was expected to have a tactical range of approximately twenty kilometres and weigh about 5,000–7,000 kg. This program is distinct from the Airborne Laser, which was a much larger system designed to destroy enemy missiles in the boost phase.

== History ==
In 1996, the blue-beam air-to-ground tactical laser was test-fired from an AC-130 (AC-X Son of Spectre) aircraft at the northern annex of the White Sands Proving Grounds near Fort Wingate, New Mexico. Raytheon was later awarded the contract to add the High Energy Microwave Weapon to the same platform where both systems would be operationally available for combat use at the same time.

In 2002, the Special Operations Command entered into a contract with the Boeing Company, specifically the Lasers and Electro-Optics Systems division in West Hills, CA, to produce a prototype laser system on a test aircraft. This effort was heavily supported by Boeing-SVS Inc. in Albuquerque, NM.

On January 18, 2006, the U.S. Air Force's 46th Test Wing supplied Boeing with a C-130H Hercules transport aircraft for use in the ATL program. Both the laser and the aircraft have undergone testing in the summer of 2006 culminating in the systems joint combined tests in 2007 with full-scale development afterward.

Boeing announced that on December 4, 2007 the installation of the laser on the C-130H Hercules was completed in preparation for further testing and a demonstration in 2008.

There has been some fear that an airborne laser system could be used to attack targets which would usually be considered 'off-limits', due to the weapon's 'plausible deniability'. Since no such weapon has ever been observed before, its effects would be hard to identify, meaning that there would rarely be conclusive proof of a laser strike. On August 13, 2008 Boeing announced the first test firing of the "high-energy chemical laser" mounted in a Hercules transport plane. The test firing was controlled via the ATL beam control system, which acquired a ground target and fired as "directed by ATL's battle management system." The ATL weighs 12,000 pounds (5,443 kg). Boeing said that the laser hit a 3 by 3 foot target at Kirtland Air Force Base, New Mexico.

According to a November 5, 2008 article there was a recent Air Force Scientific Advisory Board report stating "the Advanced Tactical Laser testbed has no operational utility." That does not mean it's not necessarily a good idea, but that it may need further development. The Air Force Research Laboratory continues to run tests and develop the platform. There is some discussion of converting to solid state lasers from the existing chemical lasers. Being much smaller and lighter, solid state lasers might be deployable on smaller platforms. The existing chemical laser platform is being used to develop more advanced control software and hardware and to reduce problems such as "jitter".

On June 18, 2009 it was announced that the ATL was successfully fired in flight for the first time. The system was fired from a 46th Test Wing NC-130H aircraft while flying over White Sands Missile Range, successfully hitting a target board on the ground.

On August 30, 2009, Boeing and the U.S. Air Force "defeated" a ground target from the air with the ATL aircraft.

The advanced tactical laser was discontinued after successful testing.

== See also ==
- YAL-1 Airborne Laser – (United States)
- Chemical laser
- High Energy Liquid Laser Area Defense System – (United States)
- Tactical High Energy Laser – (Israel, United States)
- List of laser articles
