= Skyguard (air defense system) =

Counter-drone system

SkyGuard is a powerful counter-drone solution compatible with Skycope's detection products, providing 24/7 autonomous defense operations with minimal false alarms. It offers a robust jamming capability with a jammer-to-signal distance ratio exceeding 20:1, ensuring effective defense even when drones are close to their controllers.

Specifications include a defense range of up to 3 km, a full 360-degree coverage, and operation in temperatures from –20°C to 60°C. Devices are not authorized for sale in Canada except to specific agencies until regulatory compliance is achieved. Skycope emphasizes adherence to applicable laws for international sales and leases.

== Sky guard family ==
Sky Guard family consists of many, varied solutions including moveable and permanent protection systems, concealed and exposed systems all designed to provide protection from many different threat scenarios based on conditions and budget. It's possible to order a specially adapted design or choose one of the series' off-the-shelf products.

Oerlikon Skyguard 3
This is a modernized version of the original Skyguard, utilizing a 35 mm twin-gun and missile launchers for a wide range of air defense capabilities, including against fighters, bombers, helicopters, drones, cruise missiles, and more.
Skyshield
A modular, lightweight, short-range air defense system (SHORAD) designed for rapid acquisition and destruction of aircraft and missiles, also capable of fulfilling a Counter-Rocket, Artillery, and Mortar (C-RAM) role.
Sky Warden
A system specifically designed to counter UAVs (Counter-UAV or C-UAV), offering modularity, scalability, and flexibility for various deployment scenarios, says MBDA.
MQ-9B SkyGuardian
This is a remotely piloted aircraft from General Atomics Aeronautical Systems, featuring enhanced payload capacity and an open architecture, enabling integration of various sensors and payloads for intelligence gathering, survivability, and even kinetic engagements.
Northrop Grumman Skyguard
This is a chemical laser-based area defense system designed to protect against a range of threats, including short-range ballistic missiles, rockets, artillery shells, mortars, and unmanned aerial vehicles and cruise missiles.

== See also ==
- Tactical High Energy Laser, a joint American-Israeli laser system for missile defense.
- Iron Dome, missile system deployed in Israel
