= Boeing NC-135 =

Experimental aircraft in the US

NC-135 / NKC-135
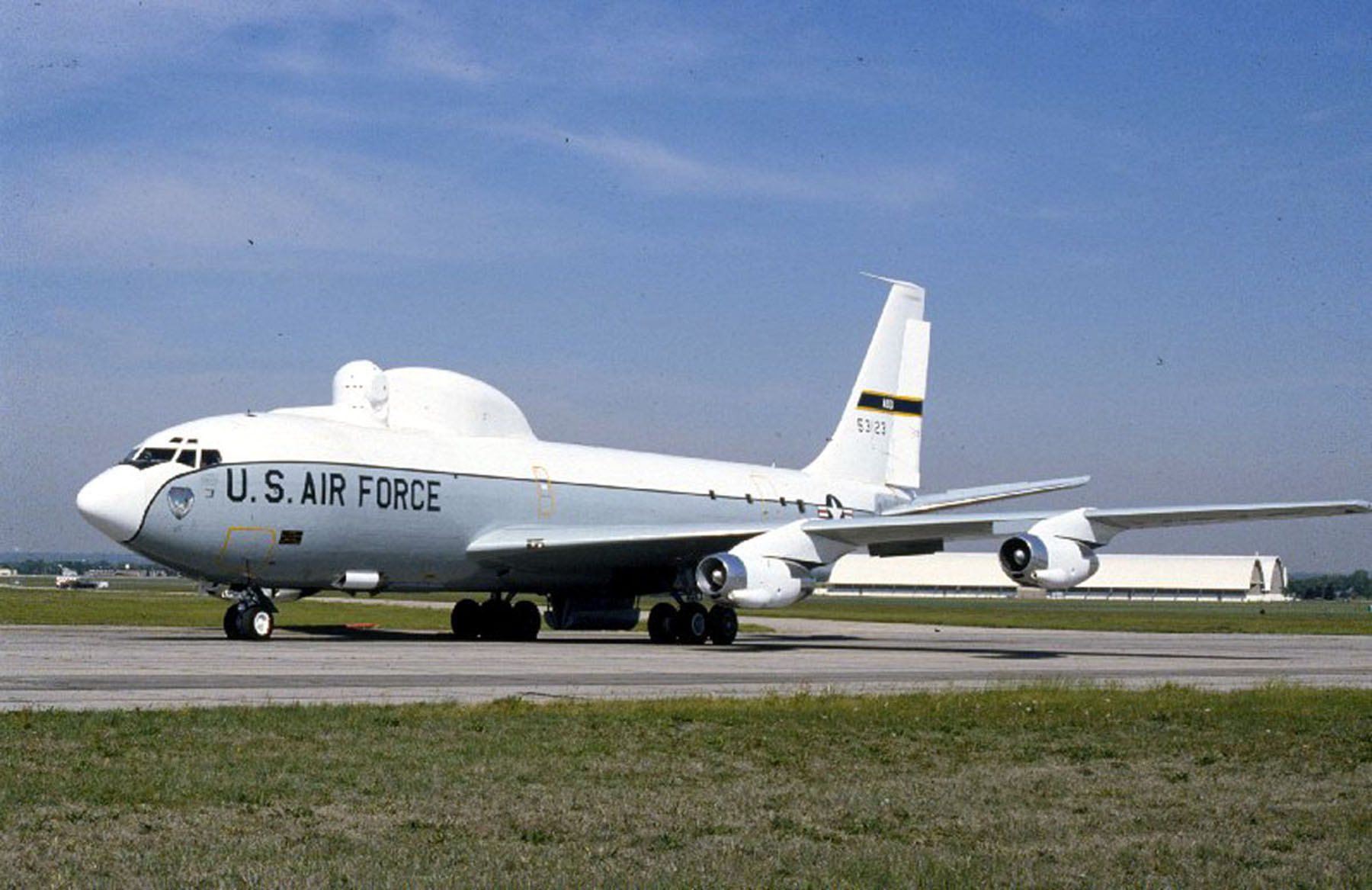
- NKC-135A Airborne Laser Lab

General information
- Type: Special test missions aircraft
- National origin: United States
- Manufacturer: Boeing
- Status: Retired
- Primary users: United States Air Force United States Navy

History
- Developed from: Boeing C-135 Stratolifter; Boeing KC-135 Stratotanker

The Boeing NC-135 and NKC-135 are special versions of the Boeing C-135 Stratolifter and Boeing KC-135 Stratotanker modified to operate on several different programs.

== Operational history ==
=== Readiness Program ===
In support of the U.S. Test Readiness Program that was initiated in response to the Limited Test Ban Treaty (LTBT) of 1963, Sandia National Laboratories configured three NC-135 aircraft as flying laboratories to support atmospheric testing of nuclear weapons, should testing resume. These aircraft were based at Kirtland Air Force Base. Work was initiated in 1963 and the aircraft remained in service until 1976, flying principally for Sandia, the Los Alamos National Laboratory, and the Lawrence Livermore National Laboratory. The Atomic Energy Commission (AEC) maintained controlling oversight of the NC-135 flight test aircraft. After 1976, the aircraft flew for Air Force Weapons Laboratory.

=== Airborne astronomy missions ===
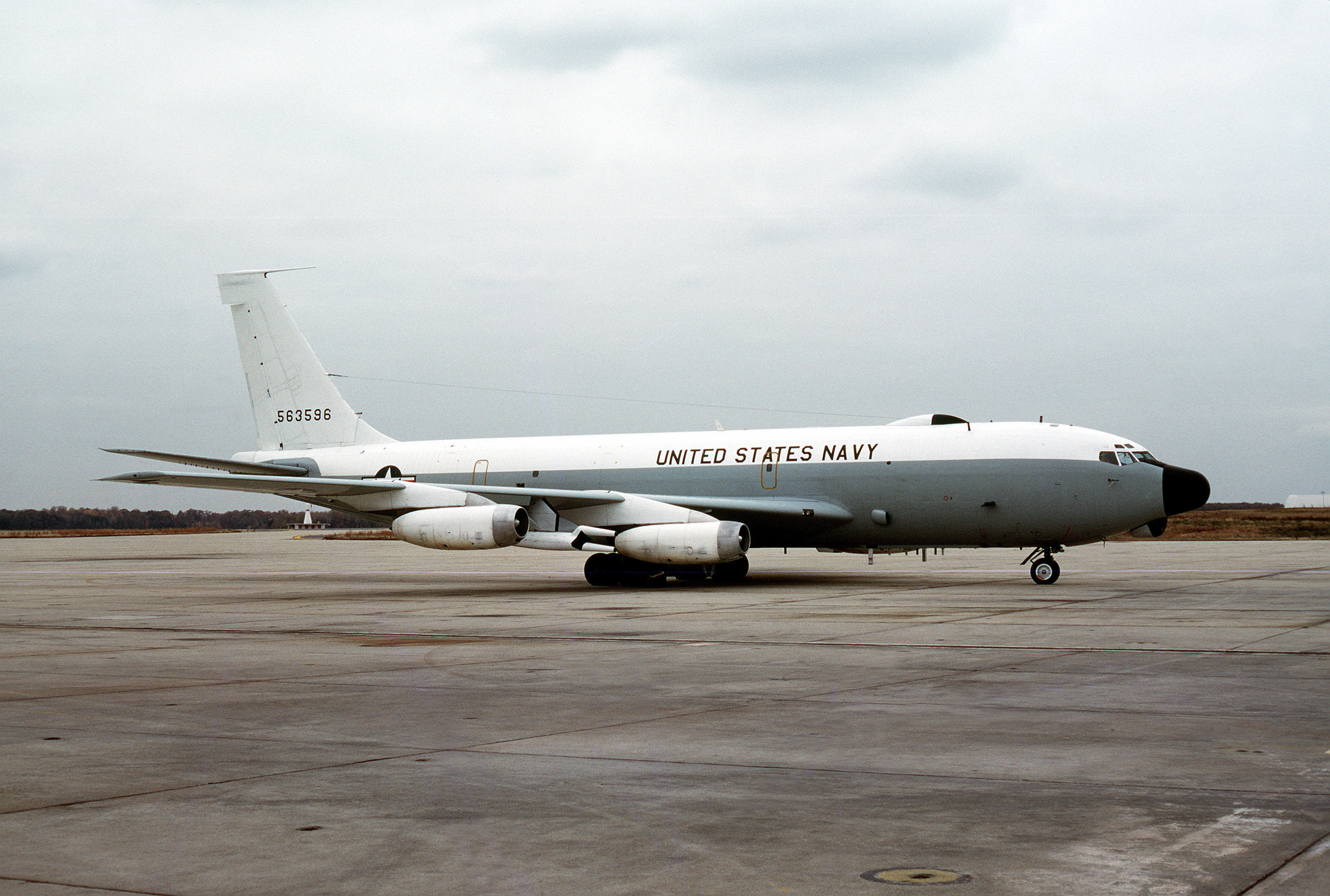
NKC-135A of the US Navy's Fleet Electronic Warfare Systems Group

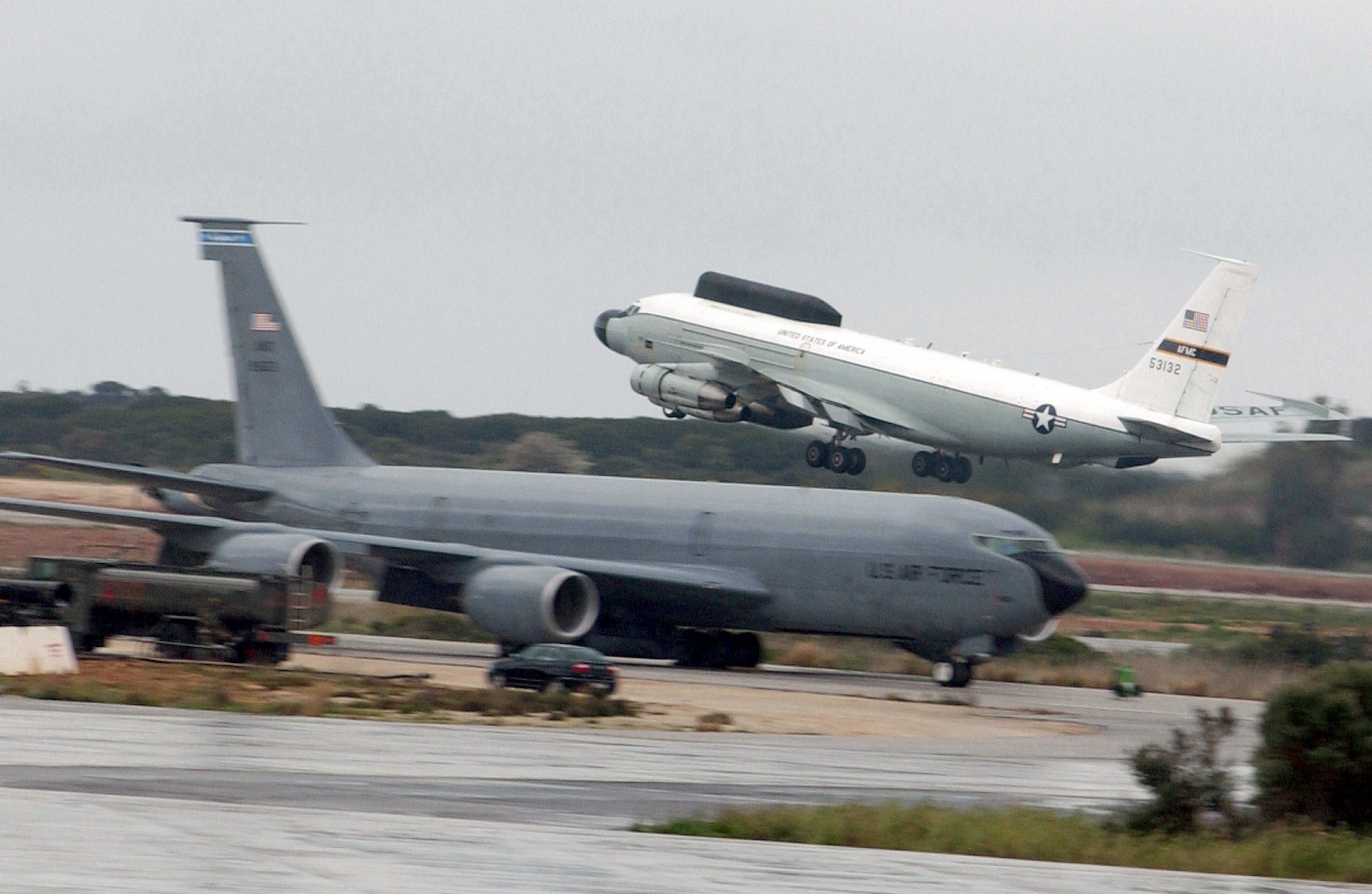
USAF NKC-135 "Big Crow" ECM aircraft takes off from a forward operating base

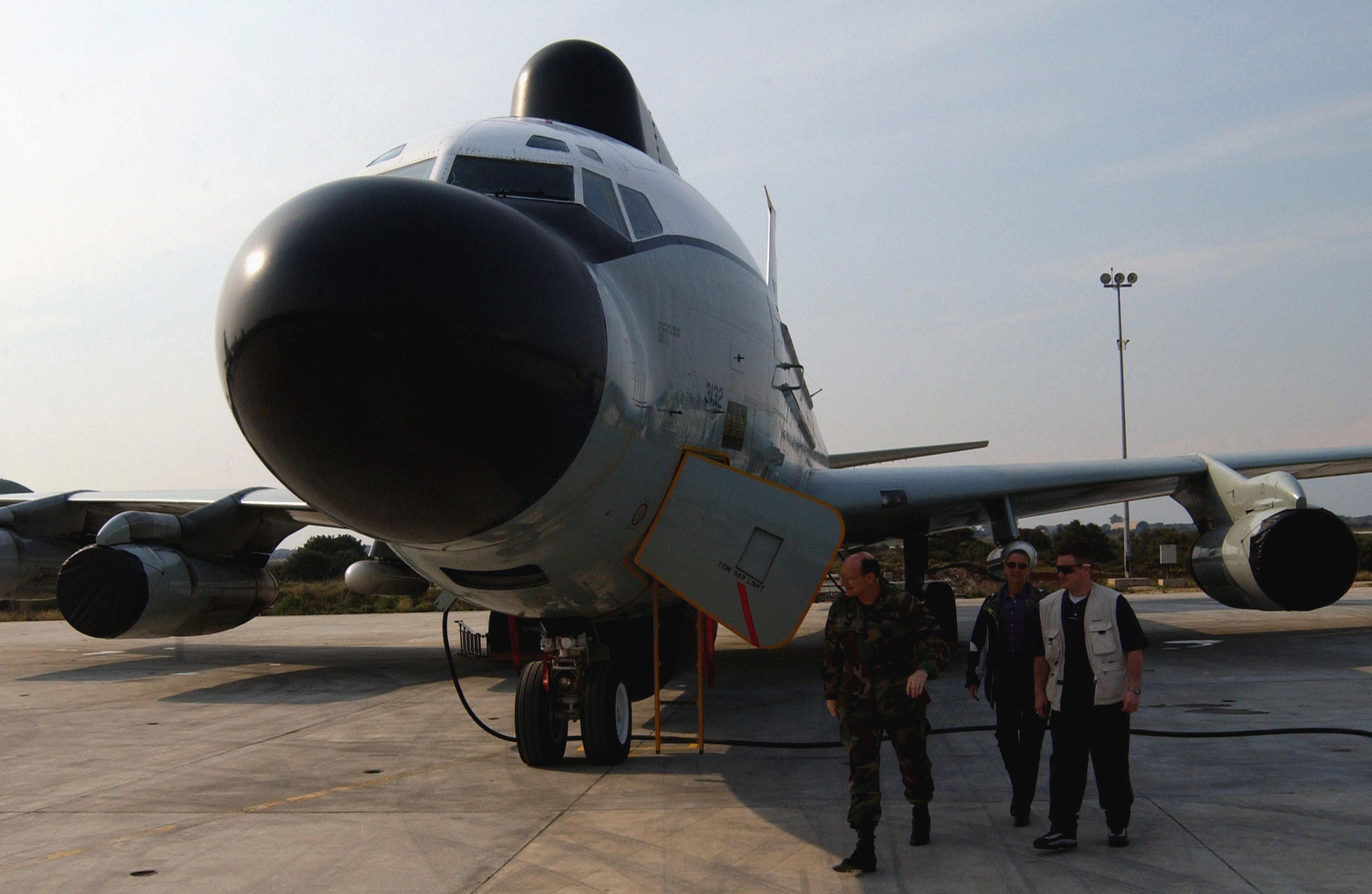
A USAF NKC-135 "Big Crow" with oversized nose at a forward deployed operating base

While flying simulations for the Test Readiness Program, the science teams assigned to the NC-135 aircraft realized that their flying laboratories could be effectively used to study solar eclipses as well as cosmic rays entering the atmosphere and the effects of magnetic fields in the ionosphere. Program scientists petitioned the AEC to allow for a program-within-a-program to use the aircraft for such scientific research. The petition was approved, and research continued through 1975.

The first eclipse mission took place from Pago Pago International Airport in 1965. Flying in conjunction with several other science aircraft, one of the NC-135s managed to fly within eclipse totality for 160 seconds, providing valuable science data. Eclipse missions were also flown in 1970, 1972, 1973, 1979 and 1980.

=== Big Crow ===
Big Crow is the designation of the two NKC-135 test-bed aircraft (55-3132 and 63-8050) heavily modified for electronic warfare testing. These planes were also used as a target simulator for flight testing the Boeing YAL-1 Airborne Laser. On March 15, 2007, the YAL-1 successfully fired this laser in flight, hitting its target. The target was the NKC-135E Big Crow 1 test aircraft that had been specially modified with a "signboard" target on its fuselage. The test validated the system's ability to track an airborne target and measure and compensate for atmospheric distortion.

Big Crow aircraft were also used as downrange telemetry assets in conjunction with Western Launch and Test Range launches from Vandenberg Air Force Base in California.

Since 2008, 55-3132 and 63-8050 have been retired, and relegated to the AMARG (Davis-Monthan AFB, Tucson, AZ).

=== Other versions ===
One aircraft, serial 61–2666, has been modified as an NC-135W to test systems and equipment used on RC-135V and W Rivet Joint reconnaissance aircraft. As of September 2023, 61-2666 has been withdrawn from use and stored at DMA.

From 1975 to 1984, the US used an NKC-135 for its Airborne Laser Lab program. The modified NKC-135A carried a 10.6 micrometer Carbon Dioxide Laser. Tests included successful interceptions of small air-to-air missiles (such as the AIM-9 Sidewinder) and of drone aircraft. Despite the combat potential of the system, it was kept strictly experimental. However, the SCUD threat faced during the Gulf War reignited interest in an airborne laser system, resulting in the Boeing YAL-1.

== Operators ==
United States

- United States Air Force
- United States Navy: Fleet Electronic Warfare Support Group

== Survivors ==
- 55-3123 - Originally built as a KC-135A, since 1984 NKC-135 Airborne Laser Lab has been on display at the National Museum of the United States Air Force in Dayton, Ohio. In August 2011 it was removed from display in the museum's Air Park to make room for the arrival of the museum's C-5A Galaxy. The aircraft is currently in storage.

== Specifications (NKC-135A) ==
Data from Encyclopedia of world military aircraft Volume 1

General characteristics

- Crew: 3: pilot, copilot, boom operator (4th crew member is a navigator for aircraft without the PACER CRAG update)
- Capacity: mission crew members
- Length: 136 ft 3 in (41.53 m)
- Wingspan: 130 ft 10 in (39.88 m)
- Height: 41 ft 8 in (12.70 m)
- Wing area: 2,433 sq ft (226.0 m^{2})
- Aspect ratio: 7.04
- Airfoil: root:BAC 310/311/312; tip: BAC 313
- Empty weight: 123,000 lb (55,792 kg) operating weight empty
- Max takeoff weight: 270,000 lb (122,470 kg)
- Fuel capacity: 189,702 lb (86,047 kg)
- Powerplant: 4 × Pratt & Whitney J57-P-43WB turbojet engines, 13,750 lbf (61.2 kN) thrust each with water-injection for take-off

Performance

- Maximum speed: 610 mph (980 km/h, 530 kn) at high altitude
- Cruise speed: 532 mph (856 km/h, 462 kn) at 35,000 ft (10,668 m)
- Combat range: 4,400 mi (7,100 km, 3,800 nmi)
- Ferry range: 9,200 mi (14,800 km, 8,000 nmi)
- Service ceiling: 41,000 ft (12,000 m)
- Rate of climb: 1,290 ft/min (6.6 m/s)
- Take-off run: 10,700 ft (3,261 m) at MTOW

== See also ==
- Aircrew

Related development

- Boeing 367-80
- Boeing 707
- Boeing C-135 Stratolifter
- Boeing C-137 Stratoliner
- Boeing EC-135
- Boeing KC-135 Stratotanker
- Boeing OC-135B Open Skies
- Boeing RC-135
- Boeing WC-135 Constant Phoenix

Aircraft of comparable role, configuration, and era

- Beriev A-60
- Boeing YAL-1
- Convair UC-880
- Douglas C-24
