= Airborne Laser =

Laser system operated from a flying platform

An airborne laser (ABL) is a laser system operated from a flying platform, as in the:

- Soviet/Russian Beriev A-60 (1981, destroyed on November 25, 2025)
- American Boeing YAL-1 (2002-2012, scrapped)
- An American modified NKC-135A unit (1975-1984, in storage.)

== Development ==
Development of airborne lasers in the United States began with the Airborne Laser Laboratory (ALL) developed at the USAF Weapons Lab (AFWL), now known as Phillips Laboratory, in the late 1970s and early 1980s. The ALL was based on a carbon dioxide gas dynamic laser (GDL), operating at the infrared wavelength of 10.6 microns, and mounted on a modified Boeing KC-135 Stratotanker (NC-135). It was successfully tested, and in 1983 destroyed five AIM-9 Sidewinder missiles and a simulated cruise missile (BQM-34).

Of note is that the ALL demonstrated one of the early uses of deformable mirror technology. To compensate for various atmospheric aberrations arising from turbulence and absorption of energy from the beam itself, it was necessary to modify the wavefront of the beam after it emerged from the laser resonator in order to ensure it would arrive at the target as a tightly focused spot.

Subsequent to the Gulf War, in 1996 the Airborne Laser (ABL) program was begun using a Chemical Oxygen Iodine Laser (COIL), also developed at AFWL in the 1970s and 1980s. The ABL was mounted on a modified Boeing 747. See Boeing YAL-1 for further discussion.

== Functionality ==
The original ALL, being a relatively long wavelength, sub-megawatt laser, killed its targets via two mechanisms. One was by direct illumination and heating of the guidance sensor of an air-to-air missile, which defeated its tracking system. The other was by heating a cruise missile or similar vehicle to the extent that the fuel tank exploded and destroyed the vehicle. Tracking used a conical scanning technique, which employed the beam of the boresighted high-energy laser to acquire and track the target vehicle via its illuminated infrared return.

The newer ABL had enough energy when fired to vaporize the metal of the missile that it was currently targeting. "It deposits enough heat to laze a hole through it. It's like taking a magnifying glass and burning a hole through a piece of paper, but we do it through metal," said Dr. Keith Truesdell, Phillips Lab chief of the applied laser technology branch. To help with firing, newer ABL systems utilize tracking lasers which have been tested recently in 2007 when the US Missile Defense Agency tested the track illuminator laser (TILL). The TILL is a solid state laser and is a key part of the fire control of the ABL system.

== Issues ==
Operational costs of an airborne laser are quite high. The projected cost of the ABL program was listed as 5.1 billion USD in 2009 according to the US Department of Defense.
