= Peresvet (laser weapon) =

Peresvet Пересвет
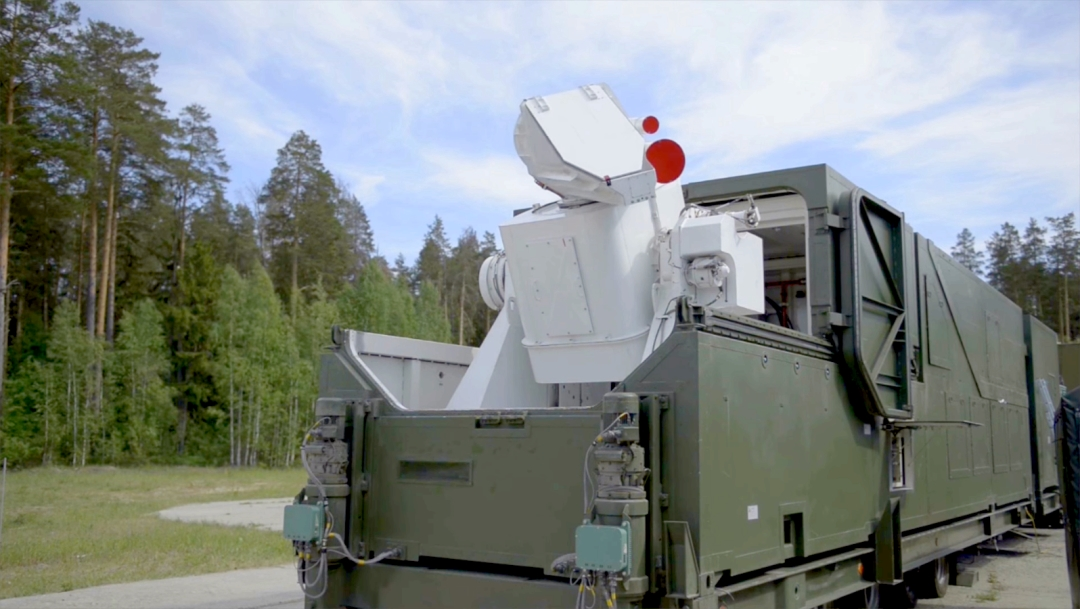
- Type: Directed-energy weapon
- Place of origin: Russian Federation

Service history
- In service: December 2019–present
- Used by: Russian Armed Forces

Production history
- Produced: 2017–present
- No. built: ~5

External videos
- Peresvet combat laser system on YouTube
- Peresvet laser system takes on test combat duty on YouTube

The Peresvet (Russian: Пересвет), named after Alexander Peresvet, is a Russian laser weapon for air defense and anti-satellite warfare.

== History ==
The system was revealed for the first time by Russian president Vladimir Putin during his message to the Federal Assembly on 1 March 2018. The equipment of the Armed Forces of the Russian Federation with the complexes began in 2017. On 1 December 2018, the Peresvet laser complex took over experimental combat duty. According to Russian president Vladimir Putin, the Peresvet laser complexes were to enter service in December 2019. The complexes have been deployed with the road-mobile ICBM launchers with the task of covering their maneuvers. On 1 December 2019, Minister of Defence of Russia Sergei Shoigu announced Peresvet was deployed with five divisions of the Strategic Missile Forces.

These sites are located :

- 58° 8'0.66"N, 60°31'19.03"E - 42nd Missile Division (ZATO Svobodny, near Nizhny Tagil)
- 55°16'13.10"N, 83° 1'4.71"E - 39th Guards Missile Division (Novosibirsk)
- 56°34'25.07"N, 48°2'23.39"E - 14th Missile Division (Yoshkar-Ola)
- 56°53'55.73"N, 40°34'42.64"E - 54th Guards Missile Order of Kutuzov Division (Teikovo, near Ivanovo)
- 53°33'19.58"N, 83°49'29.51"E - 35th Red Banner Missile Division, Orders of Kutuzov and Alexander Nevsky (Barnaul)

The sixth is being built in:

- 52°19'35.08"N, 104°23'12.26"E - 29th Guards Rocket Vitebsk Order of Lenin, Red Banner Division (Irkutsk)

== Design ==
According to the military expert Igor Korotchenko, director of the Center for Analysis of the World Trade in Arms, the Peresvet combat laser can be successfully used against unmanned aerial vehicles. At the same time, its effectiveness directly depends on environmental conditions: in good weather, it works perfectly, but fog, rain, snow and other adverse weather events can interfere with the passage of the laser beam. The expert also added that such installations consume a lot of electricity, so using them as a portable tool is unlikely to succeed; in the future they will be able to protect military bases and other locations from penetrations of UAVs into their territory.

== Operational history ==
=== Ukraine ===
In May 2022 during the 2022 Russian invasion of Ukraine, Russian Deputy Prime Minister Yury Borisov claimed a more advanced version of Peresvet dubbed "Zadira" is now being used by Russian military units in Ukraine. According to Borisov, it is capable of incinerating targets up to three miles away within five seconds. He further added “If Peresvet blinds an object, the new generation of laser weapons physically destroys the target. It is burned up,”. He also claimed the system can blind enemy satellites in orbits of up to 1,500 km and "disabling them during their fly-past by means of laser irradiation". However, according to Pentagon, US has not seen any evidence so far to corroborate Borisov's claim. Ukrainian president Volodymyr Zelenskyy mocked Russian claims as propaganda and compared it to the Wunderwaffen myth during World War II. The first combat use to successfully destroy an air target was filmed in the night between August 12 and August 13, 2025.

== Gallery ==
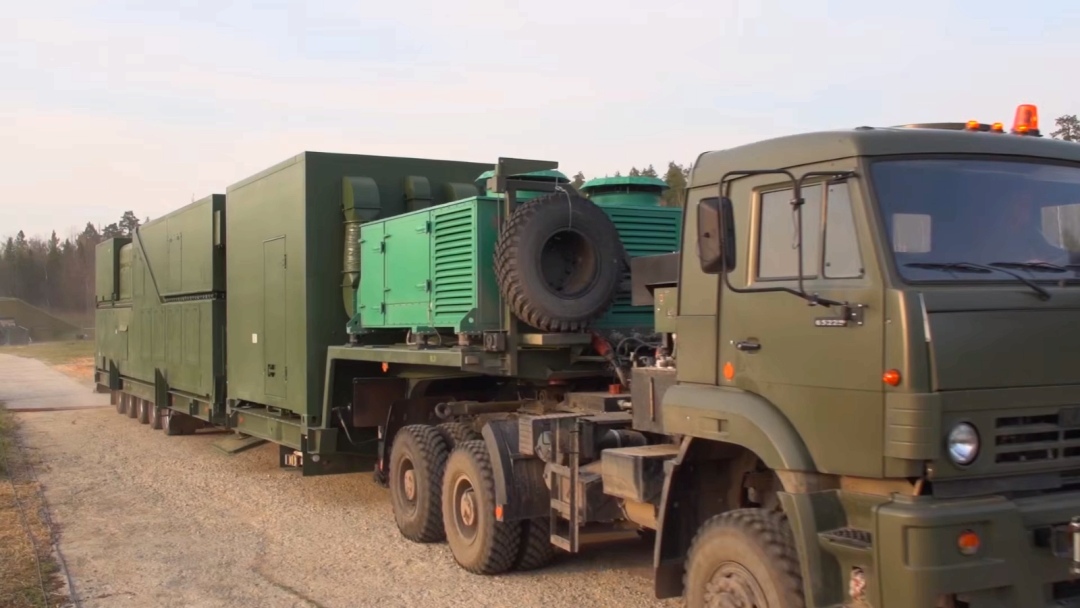
Marching configuration

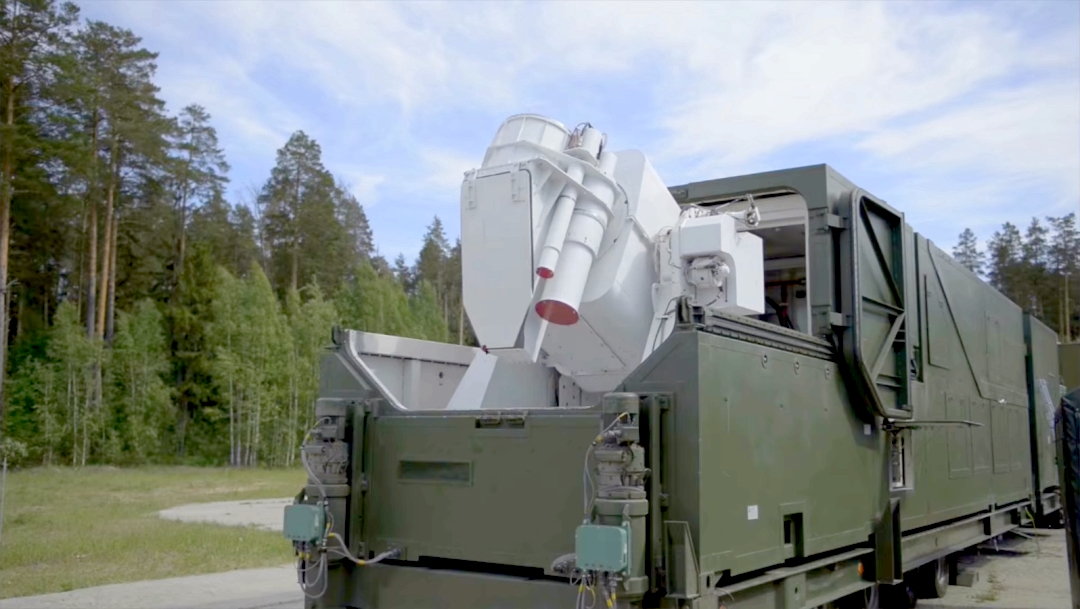
Transition to combat configuration

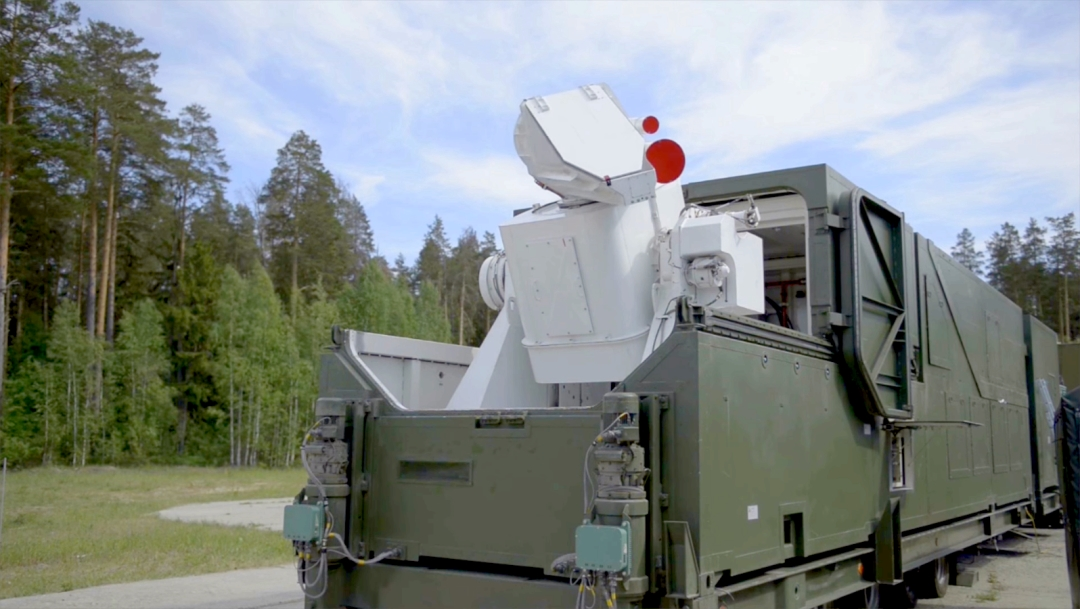
Combat configuration
