= Over-the-horizon Airborne Sensor Information System =

The Over-the-horizon Airborne Sensor Information System (OASIS) is an organic over the horizon sensor targeting and surveillance system originally produced by Texas Instruments and now by Raytheon.

It is coupled with link 16, electro-optics/infrared, radar, GPS, Tactical Data Information Exchange System TADIX-B and Officer in Tactical Command Information Exchange System (OTCIXS) information to provide a coherent tactical picture for the user. OASIS III is a hybrid of OASIS and processes and correlates all data provided via Multi-Mission Advanced Tactical Terminal (MATT) and Mini-Demand Assigned Multiple Access (DAMA). The OASIS III tactical data processor provides an (OTCIXS) message link, coupled with GPS-aided targeting using the AN/APS-137B(V)5 Radar.
