= TADIXS =

Military communications system

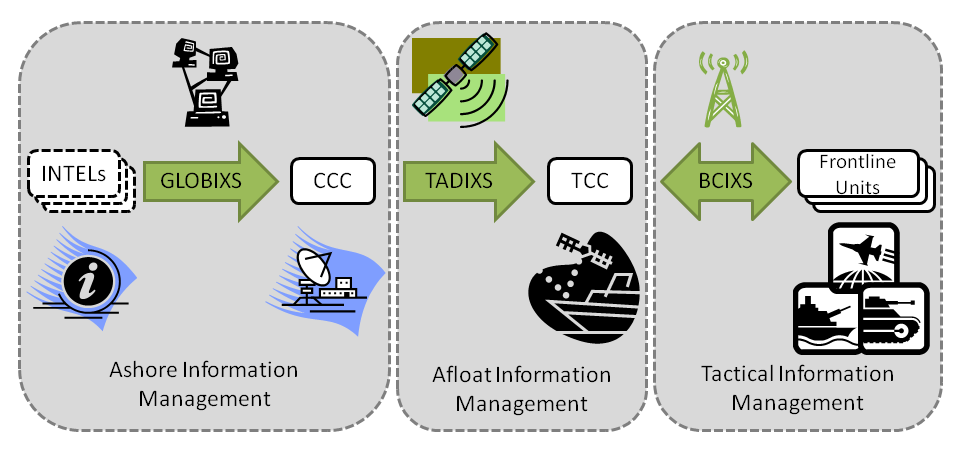
Diagram of the Copernicus C4I architecture

The Tactical Data Information Exchange Subsystem (TADIXS) is a military communications system designed to allow the exchange of tactical information between commanders using the Global Command and Control System-Maritime (GCCS-M). Specifically, TADIXS allows for communication between land-based (shore) computer systems and those on U.S. Navy fleet ships deployed around the world.

TADIXS has entered its fourth phase of development and is likely to replace the Officer in Tactical Command Information Exchange System (OTCIXS). This information exchange improves the overall situational awareness of tactical commanders in the field and strategic commanders at command and control centers.
