= OTCIXS =

Officer in Tactical Command Information Exchange System (OTCIXS) is used by the Global Command and Control System - Maritime (GCCS-M) as a means of transmitting tactical information on targets and non-targets for the purpose of creating situational awareness for tactical commanders in the field. It also provides the tactical information to strategic commanders far removed from the operational area. OTCIXS has moved from the Navy's primary means of tactical data communications to its secondary. OTCIXS is being phased out over time and replaced with other forms of information exchange such as Tactical Data Information Exchange Subsystem (TADIXS)
