= List of ship launches in 2010 =

The list of ship launches in 2010 includes a chronological list of ships launched in 2010.

Date	Ship	Class / type	Builder	Location	Country	Notes
5 January	Queen Elizabeth	Vista-class cruise ship	Fincantieri	Monfalcone	Italy	For Cunard Line
9 January	MSC Alexandra	MSC Danit-type container ship	Daewoo Shipbuilding & Marine Engineering	Geoje	South Korea	For Mediterranean Shipping Company
12 January	Pacific Egret	Nuclear waste carrier	Mitsui Engineering and Shipbuilding Co		Japan	For Pacific Nuclear Transport Limited
15 January	Flevoborg		Ferus Smit	Leer	Germany	For Wagenborg Shipping
2 February	Holland	Holland-class offshore patrol vessel	Damen Shipyard	Galați	Romania	For Royal Netherlands Navy
12 February	Deepak	Deepak-class fleet tanker	Fincantieri	La Spezia	Italy	For Indian Navy
16 February	Frankfurt Express	Prague Express-class container ship	Hyundai Heavy Industries	Ulsan	South Korea	For Hapag Lloyd
27 February	Charles Drew	Lewis and Clark-class dry cargo ship	National Steel and Shipbuilding Company	San Diego, California	United States	For United States Navy
27 February	MSC Melatilde	MSC Danit-type container ship	Daewoo Shipbuilding & Marine Engineering	Geoje	South Korea	For Mediterranean Shipping Company
28 February	Celebrity Eclipse	Solstice-class cruise ship	Meyer Werft	Papenburg	Germany	For Celebrity Cruises
11 March	Iver Huitfeldt	Iver Huitfeldt-class frigate	Odense Staalskibsværft	Odense	Denmark	For Royal Danish Navy
30 March	Edda Fides		Hijos de J. Barreras	Vigo	Spain	
1 April	MSC Fabiola	MSC Fabiola-type container ship	Samsung Heavy Industries	Geoje	South Korea	For Mediterranean Shipping Company
2 April	Chennai	Kolkata-class destroyer	Mazagon Dock Limited	Mumbai	India	For Indian Navy
4 April	Marina	Cruise ship	Fincantieri	Sestri Ponente	Italy	For Oceania Cruises
4 April	CPO Genova	MSC Danit-type container ship	Daewoo Shipbuilding & Marine Engineering	Geoje	South Korea	For Mediterranean Shipping Company
8 April	L'Austral	Cruise ship	Fincantieri	Ancona	Italy	For Compagnie du Ponant
10 April	Flinter America		Ferus Smit	Westerbroek	Netherlands	
10 April	Caballo Siete Leguas		De Hoop	Foxhol	Netherlands	
17 April	Rolldock Sea	S-class Heavy lift ship	Larsen & Toubro	Hazira	India	For Rolldock
19 April	Kamorta	Kamorta-class corvette	Garden Reach Shipbuilders and Engineers	Kolkata	India	For Indian Navy
23 April	Uthlande	Ferry	Sietas Werft	Hamburg-Neuenfelde	Germany	For Wyker Dampfschiffs-Reederei Föhr-Amrum GmbH
25 April	Jean de La Valette	High-speed catamaran	Austal	Henderson	Australia	For Virtu Ferries
29 April	Aquitaine	FREMM multipurpose frigate	DCNS	Lorient	France	For French Navy
30 April	LPGC Ayame	Very Large Gas Carrier	Mitsui O.S.K. Lines	Nagasaki	Japan	For Mitsui O.S.K. Lines
30 April	Sofia Express	Prague Express-class container ship	Hyundai Heavy Industries	Ulsan	South Korea	For Hapag Lloyd
7 May	San Diego	San Antonio-class amphibious transport dock	NGSS Ingalls	Pascagoula, Mississippi	United States	For United States Navy
15 May	Rickmers Masan	type Superflex Heavy MPC container ship	Nanjing Jinling Shipyard	Nanjing	China	For Rickmers Group
18 May	Rayo	Buque de Acción Marítima	Navantia	San Fernando, Cádiz	Spain	For Armada Española
29 May	MSC Paloma	MSC Danit-type container ship	Daewoo Shipbuilding & Marine Engineering	Geoje	South Korea	For Mediterranean Shipping Company
6 June	Spruance	Arleigh Burke-class destroyer	Bath Iron Works	Bath, Maine	United States	For United States Navy
8 June	Spirit of Britain	Ferry	STX Europe		Finland	For P&O Ferries
15 June	Severodvinsk	Yasen-class submarine	Sevmash	Severodvinsk	Russia	For Russian Navy
25 June	Maersk Eindhoven	Container ship	Hyundai Heavy Industries	Ulsan	South Korea	For Maersk Line
30 June	Finlaggan	Ferry	Remontowa S.A.	Gdańsk	Poland	For Caledonian MacBrayne
30 June	CSCL Star	CSCL Star-class container ship	Samsung Heavy Industries	Geoje	South Korea	For China Shipping Container Lines
15 July	Apa	River-class offshore patrol vessel	BAE Systems	Portsmouth	United Kingdom	For Brazilian Navy
16 July	Araguari	River-class offshore patrol vessel	BAE Systems	Portsmouth	United Kingdom	For Brazilian Navy
23 July	Stratton	Legend-class cutter	NGSS Ingalls	Pascagoula, Mississippi	United States	
23 July	CPO La Spezia	MSC Danit-type container ship	Daewoo Shipbuilding & Marine Engineering	Geoje	South Korea	For Mediterranean Shipping Company
24 July	Santa Clara	Santa-class container ship	Daewoo Shipbuilding & Marine Engineering	Okpo	South Korea	For Hamburg Süd
30 July	TMS Eventus		GS Yard	Waterhuizen	Netherlands	
6 August	Costa Favolosa	Concordia-class cruise ship	Fincantieri	Marghera	Italy	For Costa Cruises
16 August	CPO Livorno	MSC Danit-type container ship	Daewoo Shipbuilding & Marine Engineering	Geoje	South Korea	
27 August	Carnival Magic	Dream-class cruise ship	Fincantieri	Monfalcone	Italy	For Carnival Cruise Lines
27 August	MPI Adventure	Turbine Installation Vessel	Cosco Nantong Shipyard		China	For MPI Offshore
10 September	Rickmers Pohang	Type Superflex Heavy MPC container ship	Nanjing Jinling Shipyard	Nanjing	China	For Rickmers Group
11 September	Washington Chambers	Lewis and Clark-class dry cargo ship	National Steel and Shipbuilding Company	San Diego, California	United States	For United States Navy
17 September	Dixmude	Mistral-class amphibious assault ship				For French Navy
19 September	CSCL Venus	CSCL Star-class container ship	Samsung Heavy Industries	Geoje	South Korea	For China Shipping Container Lines
20 September	MSC Rosa M	MSC Danit-type container ship	Daewoo Shipbuilding & Marine Engineering	Geoje	South Korea	For Mediterranean Shipping Company
25 September	Svenja	Sietas type 183	J.J. Sietas	Hamburg-Neuenfelde	Germany	For SAL Heavy Lift
2 October	MSC Filomena	MSC Fabiola-type container ship	Samsung Heavy Industries	Geoje	South Korea	For Mediterranean Shipping Company
6 October	Relámpago	Buque de Acción Marítima	Navantia	San Fernando, Cádiz	Spain	For Armada Española
11 October	Duncan	Type 45 destroyer	BAE Systems Surface Ships	Govan, Scotland	United Kingdom	For Royal Navy
11 October	Shakti	Deepak-class fleet tanker	Fincantieri	Sestri Ponente	Italy	For Indian Navy
16 October	Santa Isabel	Santa-class container ship	Daewoo Shipbuilding & Marine Engineering	Okpo	South Korea	For Hamburg Süd
30 October	Disney Dream	Cruise ship	Meyer Werft	Papenburg	Germany	For Disney Cruise Line
30 October	Arlington	San Antonio-class amphibious transport dock	Ingalls Shipbuilding	Pascagoula, Mississippi	United States	For United States Navy
4 November	Friesland	Holland-class offshore patrol vessel	Damen Shipyard	Galați	Romania	For Royal Netherlands Navy
5 November	Cristobal Colon	Ferry	Astellios Hijos de J. Barreras	Vigo	Spain	For Naviera Armas
12 November	Germany	Lürssen	Bremen-Vegesack	Darulaman	Darussalam-class offshore patrol vessel	For Royal Brunei Navy
13 November	California	Virginia-class submarine	Newport News Shipbuilding		United States	For United States Navy
13 November	CMA CGM Alaska	MSC Fabiola-type container ship	Samsung Heavy Industries	Geoje	South Korea	For CMA CGM
13 November	CPO Napoli	MSC Danit-type container ship	Daewoo Shipbuilding & Marine Engineering	Geoje	South Korea	
20 November	Zeeland	Holland-class offshore patrol vessel	Damen Shipyard	Galați	Romania	For Royal Netherlands Navy
25 November	Johanna Schepers	Damen Container Feeder 800 container ship	Jiangsu Bolunbao Shipbuilding Co.	Yangzhong	China	
27 November	MSC Teresa	MSC Danit-type container ship	Daewoo Shipbuilding & Marine Engineering	Geoje	South Korea	
7 December	Fort Worth	Freedom-class littoral combat ship	Marinette Marine	Marinette, Wisconsin	United States	
18 December	MSC Faustina	MSC Fabiola-type container ship	Samsung Heavy Industries	Geoje	South Korea	For Mediterranean Shipping Company
21 December	Peter Willemoes	Iver Huitfeldt-class frigate	Odense Staalskibsværft	Odense	Denmark	For Royal Danish Navy
21 December	Niels Juel	Iver Huitfeldt-class frigate	Odense Staalskibsværft	Odense	Denmark	For Royal Danish Navy
25 December	Santa Catarina	Santa-class container ship	Daewoo Shipbuilding & Marine Engineering	Okpo	South Korea	For Hamburg Süd
26 December	Lone	Sietas type 183	J.J. Sietas	Hamburg-Neuenfelde	Germany	For SAL Heavy Lift
31 December	Vale Brasil	Valemax	Daewoo Shipbuilding & Marine Engineering	Okpo-dong, South Gyeongsang Province	South Korea	For Vale Shipping
Unknown date	Alicat 1	Crew transfer vessel	Alicat Workboats Ltd.	Great Yarmouth	United Kingdom	For Gardline Environmental Ltd.
Unknown date	Baltic	Tug	Astilleros Amon	Vigo	Spain	For ARGE Küstenschutz
Unknown date	Gardian 2	Crew transfer vessel	Alicat Workboats Ltd.	Great Yarmouth	United Kingdom	For Gardline Environmental Ltd.
Unknown date	Gardian 3	Crew transfer vessel	Alicat Workboats Ltd.	Great Yarmouth	United Kingdom	For Gardline Environmental Ltd.
Unknown date	Jadran	Ferry	Brodosplit	Split	Croatia	For Jadrolinija
Unknown date	Shunwa	Bulk carrier	Shimanami Shipyard	Imabari	Japan	For Wakoh Panama SA
Unknown date	Seabourn Sojourn	Cruise ship	T Mariotti SpA		Italy	For Seabourn Cruise Line
Unknown date	Seagreen	Workboat	David Abels Boatbuilders Ltd.	Bristol	United Kingdom	For Veolia Environmental Services.
Unknown date	Shoalway	Hopper dredger	Intervak Scheepswerf & Constructie BV		Netherlands	For Mersey Docks and Harbour Company
