= Military of the Canary Islands =

Military forces stationed on the Canary Islands autonomous community, Spain

The Canary Islands are an autonomous community of Spain. The headquarters of the Canary Islands military command is located in Santa Cruz de Tenerife, in the Palacio de la Capitanía General de Canarias. The following components of the Spanish Armed Forces are based in the Canary Islands:

== Spanish Army ==
16th Light Infantry Brigade “Canarias” (Santa Cruz de Tenerife) composed of three light infantry regiments, one artillery regiment, an air defense regiment, an integral helicopter battalion and other supporting elements.

Subordinate units include:

- HQ Battalion
- 9th Light Infantry Rgt. “Soria” (Fuerteventura, Las Palmas)
- 49th Light Infantry Rgt. “Tenerife” (Santa Cruz de Tenerife, Tenerife)
- 50th Light Infantry Rgt. “Canarias”
- 93rd Field Artillery Rgt. (155/52mm howitzers, 105/37mm light guns and Mistral short-range SAMs) (San Cristóbal de La Laguna, Tenerife)
- 94th Air Defence Artillery Rgt. (NASAMS medium-range air defence missiles, Mistral short-range SAMs and 35/90 SKYDOR anti-aircraft guns)
- 15th Engineer Battalion (San Cristóbal de La Laguna)
- 82nd Military logistics|Logistics Group
- 6th Helicopter Battalion (AS332 Super Puma (3) and AB212 Twin Hueys (5))(San Cristóbal de La Laguna)
- Signals Company

== Spanish Air and Space Force ==
Mando Aéreo de Canarias Las Palmas de Gran Canaria

Las Palmas - Gando Air Base (GCLP) Rwy 03L/21R, 03R/21L 27° 55' 49.001 N 15° 23' 4.999 W Elev: 77 ft.
Ala/Grupo (Wing/Group)	Escuadrón (Squadron)	Aircraft Type	Codes
Ala 46	462 Esc. 802 Esc.	McDonnell Douglas F/A-18 Hornet (22 aircraft) Eurocopter Cougar (3 aircraft) CN-235 VIGMA (3 aircraft)	46-01 - 802-10

The 46th Wing is to convert from the F-18 Hornet to the Tranche 4 Eurofighter Typhoon starting in 2026.

== Spanish Navy ==
=== Naval Command of the Canary Islands ===
There are seven local commands under the main Naval Command of the Canary Islands.

- Naval Command of Santa Cruz de Tenerife
- Naval Command of Las Palmas de Gran Canaria
- Minor Naval Command of Santa Cruz de la Palma
- Minor Naval Command of Hierro
- Minor Naval Command of San Sebastián de la Gomera
- Minor Naval Command of Puerto del Rosario (Fuerteventura)
- Minor Naval Command of Arrecife de Lanzarote

=== Las Palmas Naval Base ===
The following vessels are assigned to Las Palmas Naval Base;

- Meteoro-class offshore patrol vessels: Meteoro, Rayo, Relámpago, Tornado

=== Marine Infantry ===
Units of the Marine Infantry are based in the Canary Islands. The Canarias Security Unit (USCAN) includes a security company and naval police company.

== Civil Guard ==
Elements of the Civil Guard and the National Police are also deployed in the territory for purposes of both border and internal security. The Civil Guard includes a maritime component and, as of 2020, at least two patrol boats and a national police helicopter were forward-deployed to Senegal to assist in stemming illegal migrant traffic to the Canary Islands.
