= Spanish ship Rayo =

Several ships of the Spanish Navy have borne the name Rayo:

- Spanish ship Rayo (1740), a 6-gun fireship
- Spanish ship Rayo (1749), an 80-gun ship of the line, later rebuilt as a 100-gun three-decker, fought and sunk at the Battle of Trafalgar
- Spanish gunboat Rayo, a gunboat, saw service in Cuba
- Spanish torpedo boat Rayo, a torpedo boat, entered service in 1886
- Spanish destroyer Rayo, an Audaz-class destroyer
- Spanish patrol vessel Rayo (P-42), a Buque de Acción Marítima patrol vessel
