= Royal Dockyard (disambiguation) =

Royal Dockyard was, for several centuries, the official designation of the Royal Navy's shore bases in Britain, Ireland and around the world.

It may also be used, in translation, to refer to similar facilities in other countries; for example:

- Spanish Royal Dockyards with multiple locations:
  - Esteiro Royal Dockyards in Ferrol
  - Cartagena Royal Dockyards in Cartagena
  - Carraca Royal Dockyards in Cádiz
