= WD Mersey =

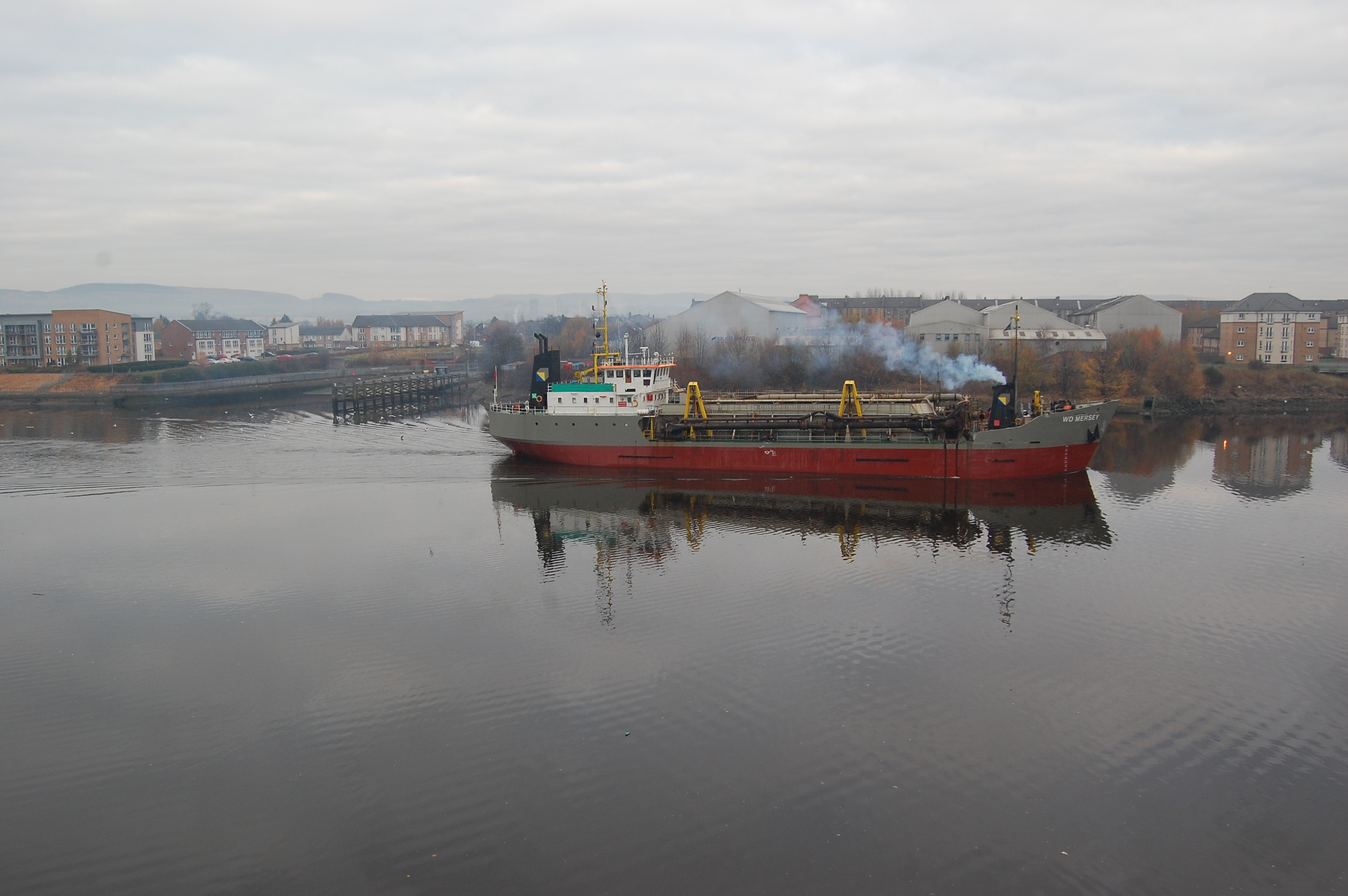
- WD Mersey in the Firth of Clyde in 2013

History

- Name: WD Mersey (2007 – present); Bragadin (1982-2007)
- Namesake: River Mersey
- Owner: Boskalis Westminster
- Operator: Boskalis Westminster
- Port of registry: Liverpool, United Kingdom (2007 – present); Venice, Italy (1982-2007)
- Builder: Achille Lucchese, Venice, Italy
- Laid down: 1982
- Launched: 1983
- In service: 2008 (Rebuilt)
- Out of service: 2015
- Identification: Call sign: 2ALU5; IMO number: 8123195; MMSI number: 235060858

General characteristics
- Type: Dredger
- Tonnage: 1,595 GT
- Length: 61.92 m (203 ft)
- Beam: 13.00 m (43 ft)
- Draught: 5.50 m (18 ft) (summer); 5.95 m (20 ft) (dredging)
- Depth: 6.30 m (21 ft)
- Decks: 4
- Installed power: 4,012 kW (5,380 hp)
- Propulsion: FIAT main engines 930 kW (1,250 hp) x 2 & 150 kW (200 hp) bow thruster
- Speed: 8.6 kn
- Capacity: 1826 m3
- Crew: 9

The TSHD WD Mersey is a British trailing suction hopper dredger, owned and operated by Boskalis Westminster Ltd (known as Westminster Dredging Company until 2014) and built in Italy. The ship maintained ports around the British Isles, including Liverpool, the Manchester Ship Canal, Harwich, Heysham and the Firth of Clyde

In 2017 she was sold and renamed UMD Hercules.
