= Spanish ship Tornado =

At least two ships of the Spanish Navy have borne the name Tornado:

- Spanish corvette Tornado
- Spanish patrol vessel Tornado (P-44)
