= Spanish patrol vessel Audaz =

Spanish Navy patrol vessel commissioned in 2018

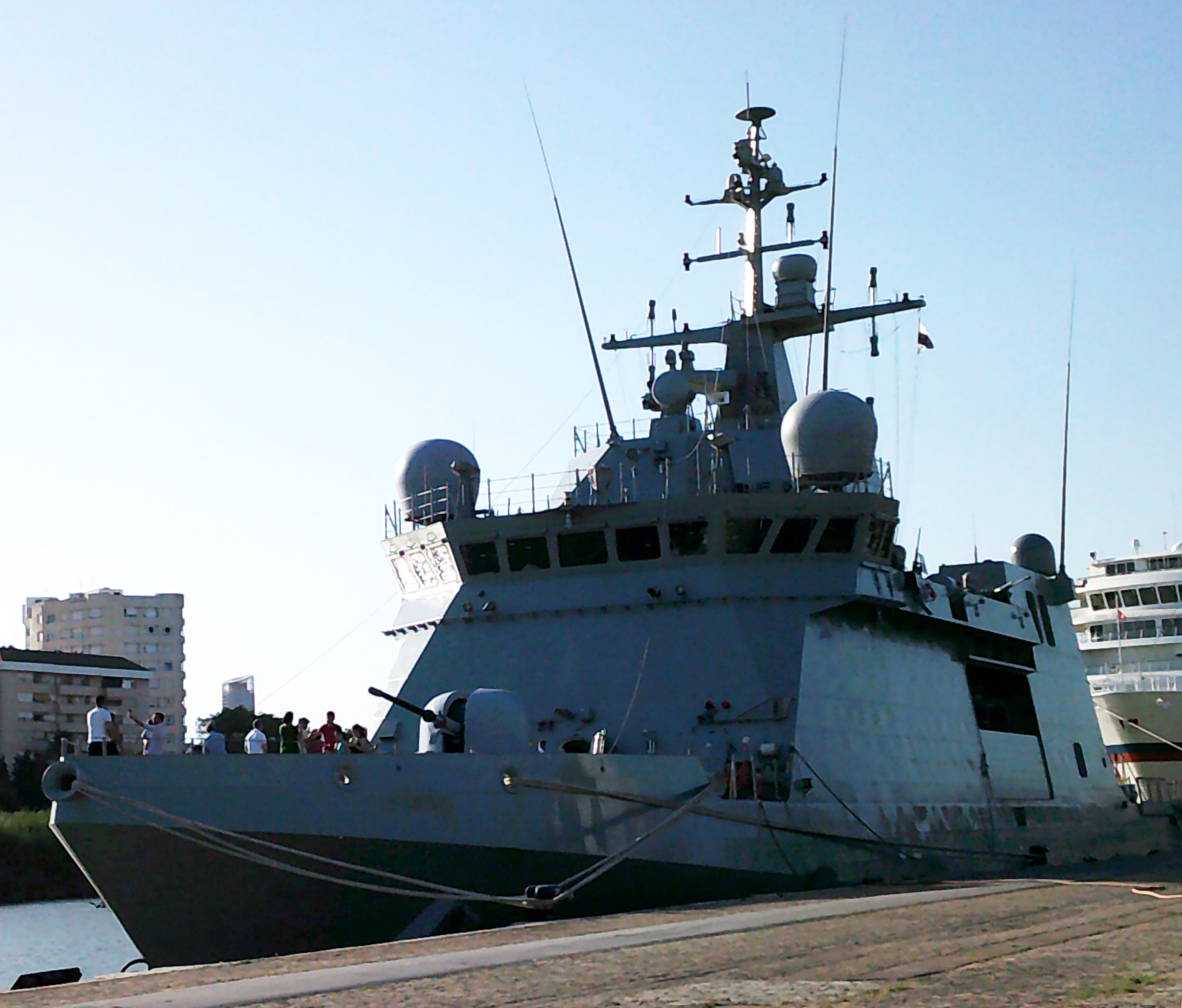
- Audaz P-45 docked in the Port of Seville.

History

Spain
- Name: Audaz
- Ordered: 7 May 2014
- Builder: NAVANTIA
- Cost: €166.74m (US$224m)
- Laid down: 29 April 2016
- Launched: 30 March 2017
- Commissioned: 27 July 2018
- Home port: Cartagena Naval Base
- Identification: Pennant number: P-45; MMSI number: 224062000; Callsign: EBFI
- Status: In active service

General characteristics
- Class & type: Meteoro class BAM
- Displacement: 2860 tons full load
- Length: 93.9 metres (308 ft)
- Beam: 14.2 metres (47 ft)
- Draft: 4.2 metres (14 ft)
- Propulsion: 2 diesel engines; 4 groups diesel generators; 2 electric motors propellers; 1 Emergency generator; Located 2 cross bow thruster
- Speed: 20 knots (37 km/h; 23 mph)
- Range: 3,500 nautical miles (6,500 km; 4,000 mi)
- Complement: 46 crew and 30 forces
- Armament: 1 cannon 76 mm/62 gun; 2 x 25 mm automatic mountings; 2 × 12.7 mm machine guns
- Aircraft carried: 1 × NH-90

Audaz (P-45) is an offshore patrol vessel and the fifth of the Meteoro class created for the Spanish Navy. It is the fourth Navy ship to carry this name. The patrol vessel was built in the Navantia's shipyard in San Fernando.

== Order and construction ==
On May 7, 2014, SEPI announced that it had approved the construction of two new units, one to be built at the Cádiz shipyard in San Fernando / Puerto Real and the other at Ferrol. The first sheet metal cut for these vessels, was carried out simultaneously in the shipyards of the bay of Cádiz and those of the Ferrol estuary on December 5, 2014. Order No. DEF/1564/2015 was published in the Official State Gazette on June 26, 2015, which names of these two ships as Audaz (P-45) and Furor (P-46).

The ship was laid down on April 29, 2016, and launched on March 30, 2017, at the San Fernando shipyard. The operational tests were done between the 15 and 21 of May 2018. The ship was commissioned on July 27, 2018.

== Operational history ==
The Audaz was assigned to the Naval Base of Cartagena where it arrived in September 2018.

It first mission was assigned on 20 August 2019. It consisted of heading to the island of Lampedusa, Italy to escort the Open Arms vessel to the port of Mahon, Spain after Italian interior minister, Matteo Salvini, denied the ship's entry to the country.
