= Las Palmas Naval Base =

Coordinates: 28°08′07″N 15°25′36″W

- Arsenal de Las Palmas
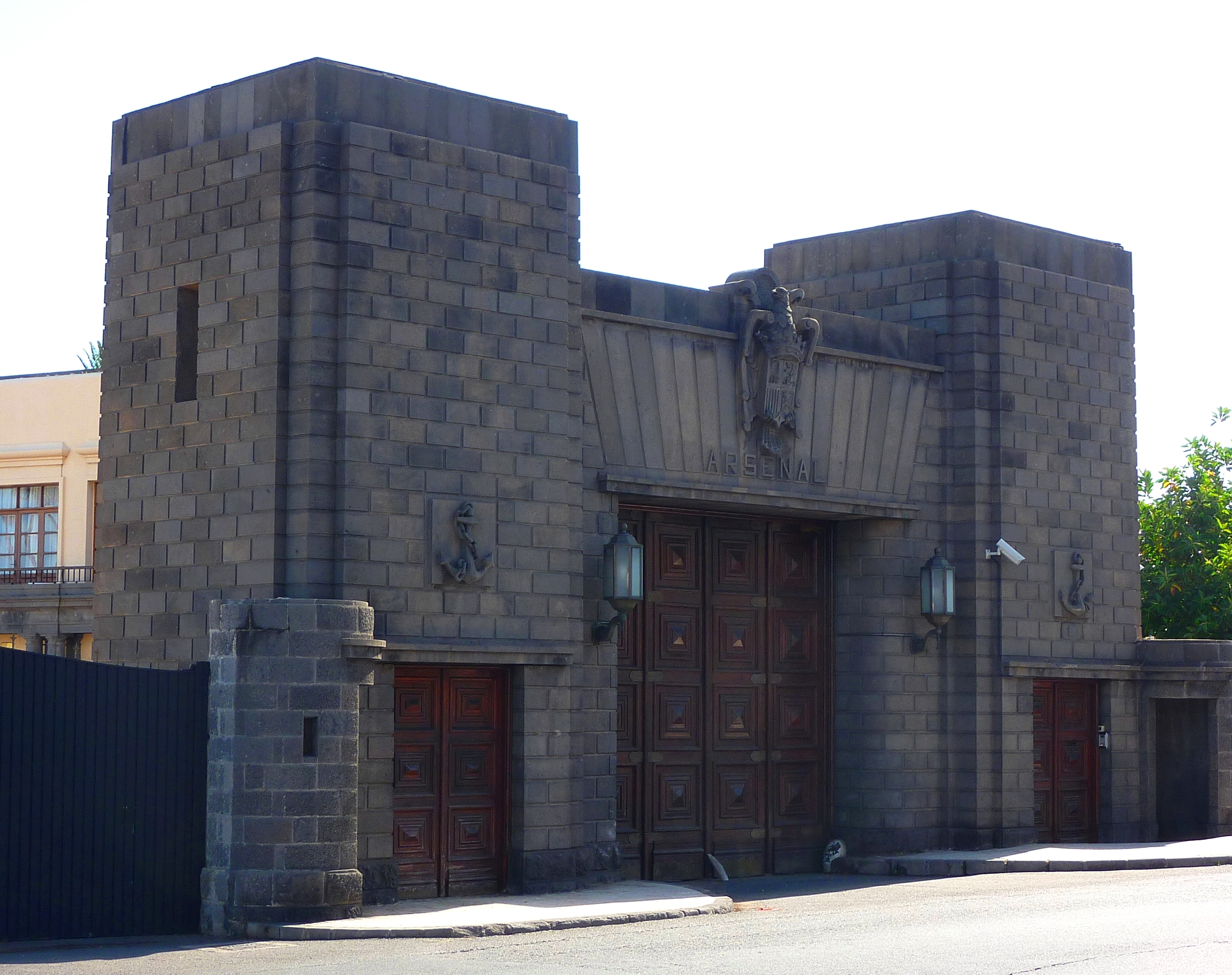

Site information
- Type: Military base
- Owner: Spain
- Controlled by: Spanish Navy

Site history
- Built: 1922
- In use: 1941 –present

Garrison information
- Current commander: CAPT José María Ripoll Cantero
- Occupants: See Ships

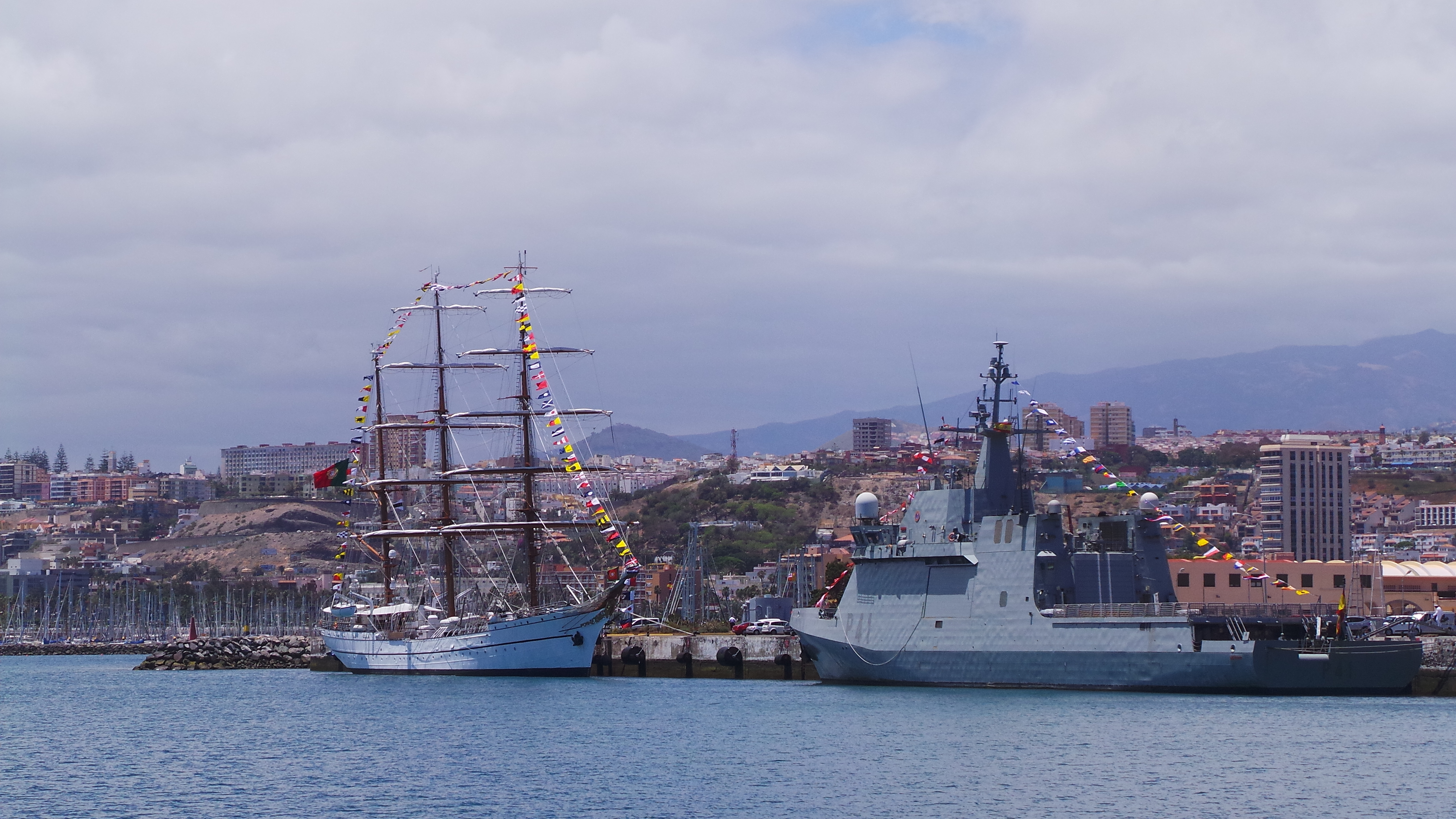
Portuguese Navy ship NRP Sagres and Meteoro in the Naval Base of Las Palmas

Las Palmas Naval Base, also known as Arsenal of Las Palmas, is a military base and arsenal of the Spanish Navy located in the city of Las Palmas, Spain. It is the largest military base of the Spanish Navy on the African continent.

== History ==
In 1922 the Association of Fruit Exporters of Las Palmas began the construction of a dock on the ruins of the Royal Castle of Santa Catalina. During World War II, because of the continuous presence of warships of the belligerent countries, the Spanish State took the decision to establish a permanent naval base in the Canary Islands. In 1941 it was temporarily expropriated by the government.

In 1948, the Arsenal of Las Palmas was formally established at the Nuestra Señora del Pino dock, the Air Force's Seaplane Base. More land was later purchased, allowing the construction of several buildings, named after the first Chief of the Arsenal.

During the 1950s two docks were constructed to accommodate submarines. In 2000, the Spanish Navy Marines Corps of Canaries moved from the Manuel Lois Barracks to the Arsenal, where several buildings were converted to accommodate the necessary offices and storerooms.

== Ships ==
- Buques de Acción Marítima (Offshore patrol vessel)
  - Meteoro
  - Rayo
  - Relámpago
  - Tornado

== See also ==
- Rota Naval Base
- Cartagena Naval Base
