= Italian frigate Virginio Fasan (F 591) =

FREMM class multi-purpose frigates in the Italian Navy

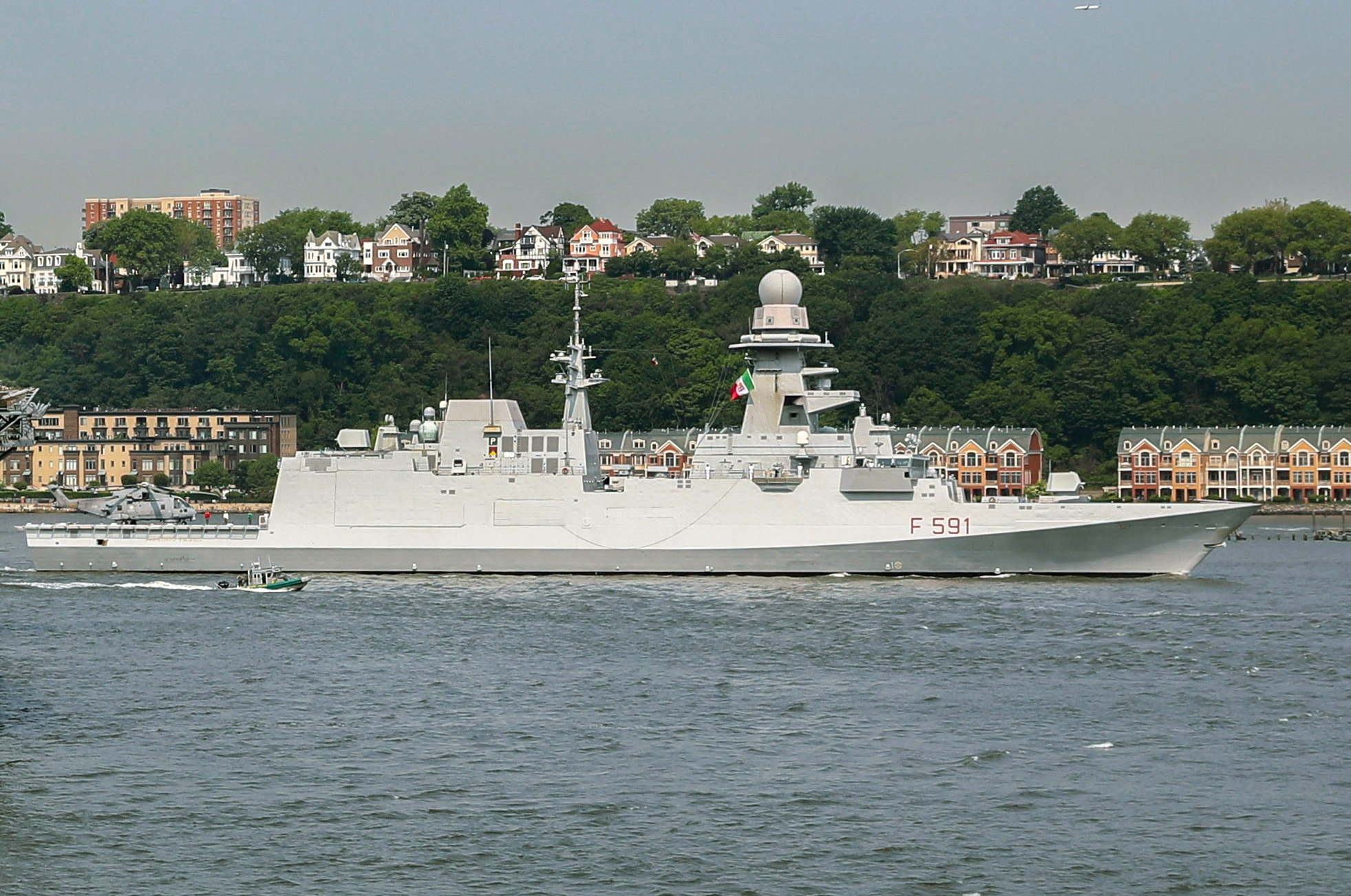
- Virginio Fasan on 24 May 2023

History

Italy
- Name: Virginio Fasan
- Namesake: Virginio Fasan
- Builder: Fincantieri, Riva Trigoso and Muggiano
- Laid down: 12 May 2009
- Launched: 31 March 2012
- Commissioned: 19 December 2013
- Home port: La Spezia
- Identification: MMSI number: 247306900; Callsign: IOGY; Pennant number: F 591
- Motto: In aleis strenua; (In strenuous aleis)
- Status: Active

General characteristics
- Class & type: Carlo Bergamini-class frigate
- Displacement: 6,700 tons
- Length: 144.6 m (474 ft 5 in)
- Beam: 19.7 m (64 ft 8 in)
- Draught: 8.7 m (28 ft 7 in)
- Propulsion: CODLAG; 1 × 32 MW gas turbine General Electric/Avio LM2500+G4; 2 × 2.5 MW electric motors Jeumont Electric; 4 × diesel generators; VL 1716 (T2ME series by 2.15 MW everyone, on first two frigate; HPCR series by 2.8 MW everyone, since the third frigate); 2 × shafts, driving controllable pitch propellers; 1 × 1 MW bow thruster
- Speed: 27 knots (50 km/h; 31 mph) max
- Range: 6,800 nmi (12,600 km; 7,800 mi) at 15 knots (28 km/h; 17 mph)
- Complement: 201
- Sensors & processing systems: Leonardo Kronos Grand Naval (MFRA) active electronically scanned array radar; CAPTAS-4 towed-array sonar; UMS 4110 CL hull-mounted sonar
- Armament: 16-cell MBDA SYLVER A50 VLS for 16 MBDA Aster 15 and 30 missiles; 2 × Leonardo OTO Melara 76 mm/62 Davide/Strales CIWS guns; 2 × Leonardo Oto Melara/Oerlikon KBA 25 mm/80 remote weapon systems; 4 × MBDA Teseo Mk 2/A anti-ship and land attack missiles; 4 × MBDA MILAS anti-submarine missiles; 2 × triple Leonardo (WASS) B-515/3 launcher for MU 90 torpedoes; 2 × SITEP MASS CS-424 acoustic guns
- Aircraft carried: 2 × SH90; 1 × SH90; 1 × AW101 (armed with MU 90 torpedoes or MBDA Marte Mk2/S missiles)
- Aviation facilities: Double hangar

Virginio Fasan (F 591) is a Carlo Bergamini-class frigate of the Italian Navy. The vessel was constructed at Fincantieri's La Spezia shipyard and was launched on 31 March 2012. The frigate has been deployed on EUNAVFOR missions to counter piracy and attacks on commercial shipping in the Red Sea.

== Development and design ==
Planning assumptions for the Italian Navy are ten FREMM-IT, four anti-submarine warfare (ASW) variants and six general purpose (GP) variants, at a cost of €5.9 billion. FREMM-IT will replace the Maestrale and Lupo-class frigates in service with the Italian Navy. In the 2013 Italian budget, the Italian government laid out the necessary financing for two more GP variants (FREMM-IT 7 & 8) and the contract was awarded in September 2013. On 15 April 2015, the Italian Parliament confirmed the deal between OCCAR and Orizzonte Sistemi Navali Spa (Fincantieri and Finmeccanica, since 2017 Leonardo) to begin building units 9 and 10, for 764 million Euros.

As of 16 April 2015, the Italian government approved funding for all ten FREMM-IT to be delivered to the Italian Navy.

FREMM-IT 9 & 10 have undisclosed enhanced capabilities. All ten Italian FREMM-ITs have extended anti-air warfare capabilities, with SAAM-ESD CMS, Aster 30 and Aster 15 missiles for extended area defence. SAAM-ESD CMS use Leonardo MFRA, a 3D active radar (AESA), an evolved version of the Leonardo EMPAR PESA radar (previously embarked on Horizon-class destroyers and the aircraft carrier Cavour). Since the seventh FREMM-IT, there ships have been updated, such as new conformal IFF antenna and much more stealth response. Since the ninth FREMM-IT, SCLAR-H replaced with Leonardo ODLS-20. In 2017 the Italian FREMM refit started with the installation on each of two SITEP MS-424 acoustic guns.

== Construction and career ==
On 31 March 2012, the ship, named after Virginio Fasan, was launched. The frigate was commissioned into the Italian Navy on 19 December 2013 and is based at La Spezia as part of 2° Comando Gruppo Navale.

Virginio Fasan was deployed as part of EUNAVFOR's counter-piracy Operation Atalanta in 2017. On 18 November, the ship responded to a series of attacks on a container ship and a fishing vessel. The attacks on the container ship included the use of rocket-propelled grenades. Virginio Fasan located the assailants and a team of Italian marines were deployed via the frigate's helicopter to detain the pirates. A motor whaler and a skiff were captured and six people were detained by the marines.

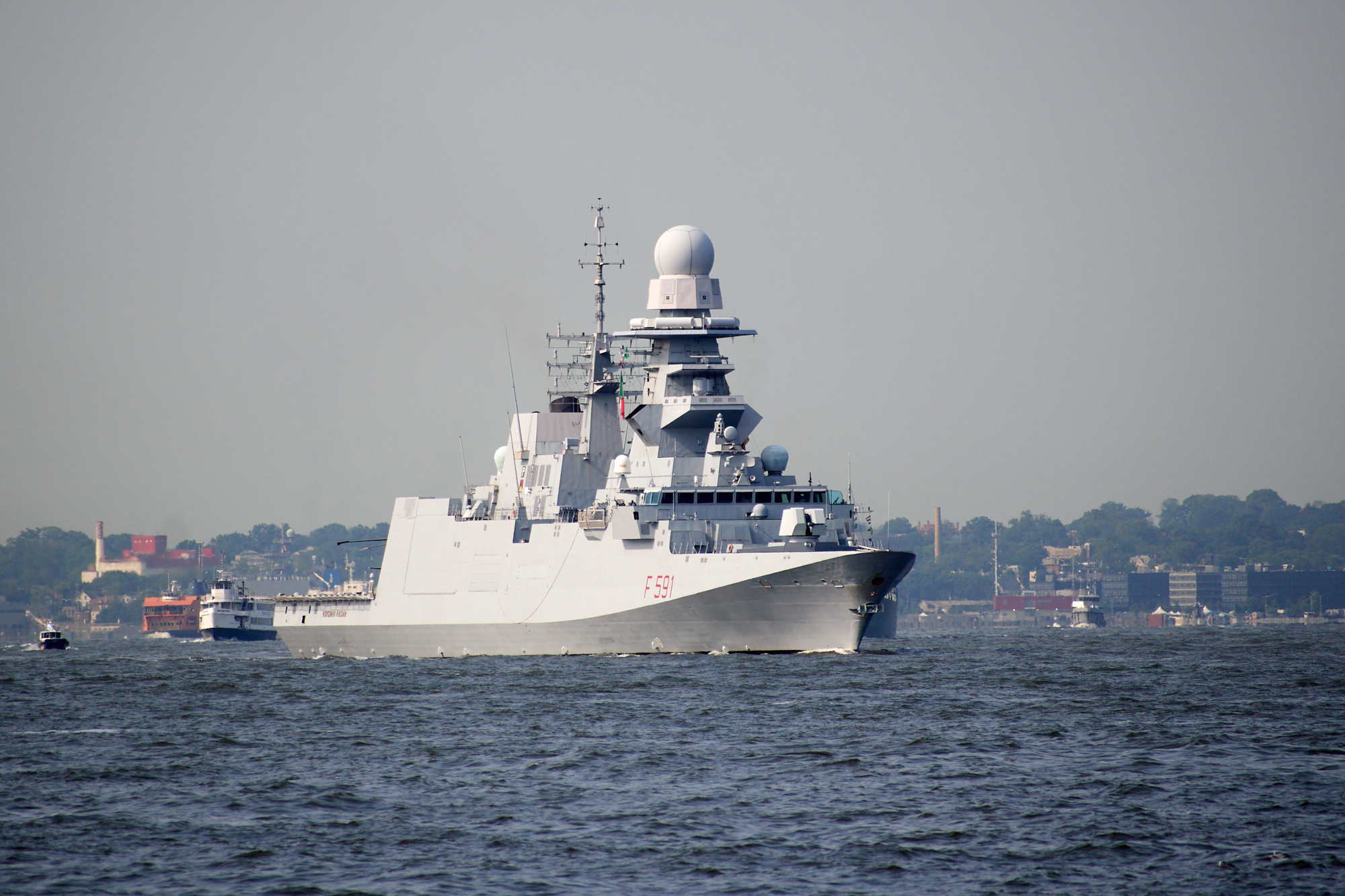
Virginio Fasan in Hudson River, New York City, May 2023

On 29 April 2024, while deployed to the Red Sea as part of the European Union's Operation Aspides, Virginio Fasan shot down a Houthi unmanned aerial vehicle with its 3-inch gun.

On May 6, 2024, while protecting civilian ships Virginio Fasan shot down another enemy drone .

During Italian navy day 2024 the Italian navy chief of staff confirmed that Virginio Fasan shot down another 2 enemy drones in early June 2024 .

On September 24, 2025, the Fasan, which was sailing north of Crete as part of Operation Mediterraneo Sicuro, was authorized to intervene immediately by the Minister of Defense Guido Crosetto to provide assistance to the Italian citizens on the Global Sumud Flotilla after the convoy reported explosions by "unidentified objects". The Italian frigate will be joined by the Spanish vessel Furor (P-46).
