= Spanish patrol vessel Furor =

2017 Meteoro-class offshore patrol vessel

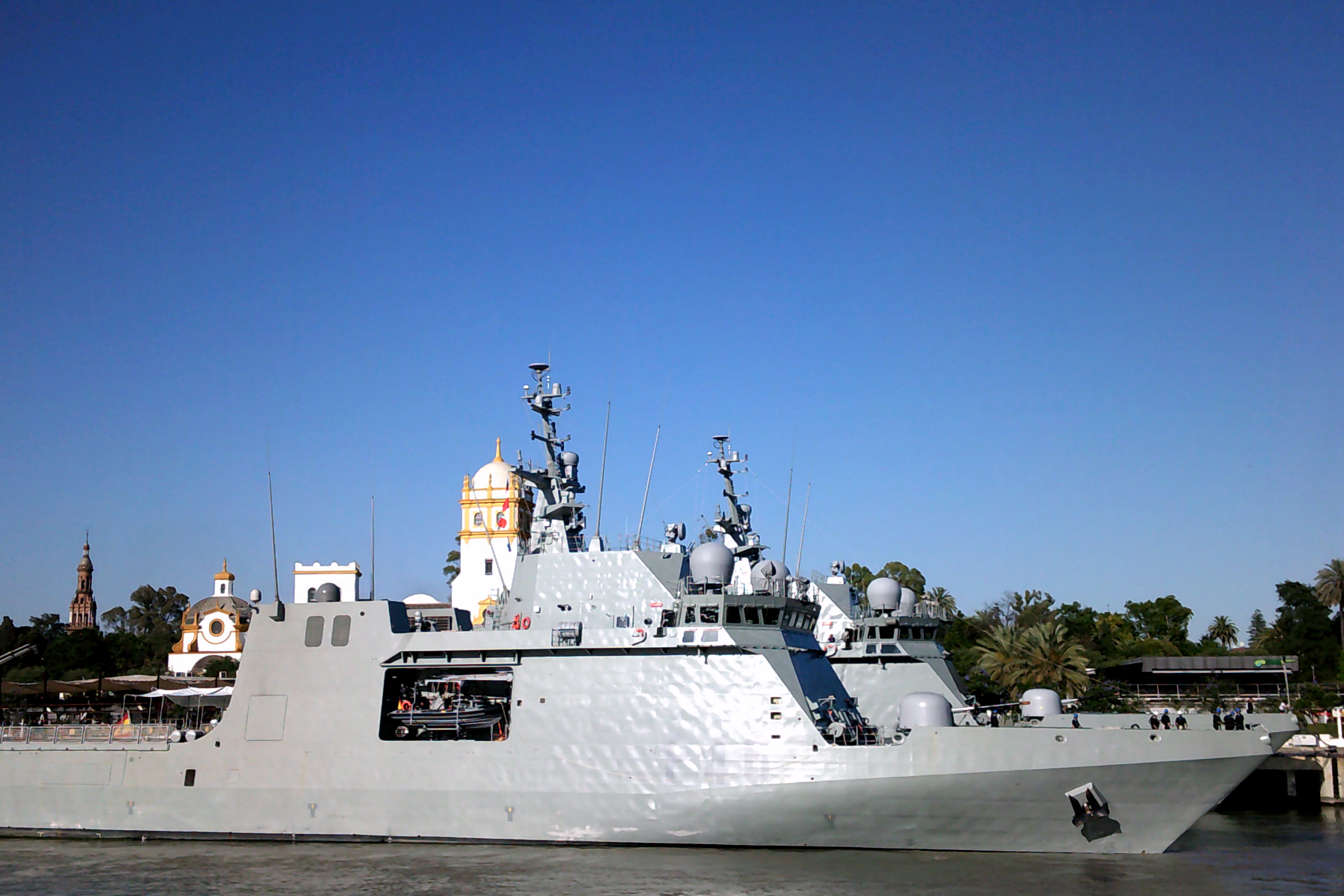
- Furor (P-46) at Delicias Dock in Seville, May 2019

History

Spain
- Name: Furor
- Ordered: 7 May 2014
- Builder: NAVANTIA
- Cost: €166.74m (US$224m)
- Laid down: 29 April 2016
- Launched: 8 September 2017
- Commissioned: 21 January 2019
- Home port: Cartagena Naval Base
- Identification: Pennant number: P-46; MMSI number: 224067000; Callsign: EBFJ
- Status: In active service

General characteristics
- Class & type: Meteoro-class BAM
- Displacement: 2860 tons full load
- Length: 93.9 m (308 ft 1 in)
- Beam: 14.2 m (46 ft 7 in)
- Draft: 4.2 m (13 ft 9 in)
- Propulsion: 2 diesel engines; 4 groups diesel generators; 2 electric motors propellers; 1 emergency generator; Located 2 cross bow thruster
- Speed: 20 knots (37 km/h; 23 mph)
- Range: 3,500 nmi (6,500 km; 4,000 mi)
- Complement: 46 crew and 30 forces
- Armament: 1 × 76 mm/62 gun; 2 x 25 mm automatic mountings; 2 × 12.7 mm machine guns
- Aircraft carried: 1 × NH-90 helicopter

Furor (P-46) is an offshore patrol vessel and the sixth of the Meteoro class created for the Spanish Navy.

== Construction and career ==
On 7 May 2014, SEPI announced that it had approved the construction of two new units, one to be built at the Cádiz shipyard in San Fernando / Puerto Real and the other at Ferrol. The first sheet metal cut for these vessels, was carried out simultaneously in the shipyards of the bay of Cádiz and those of the Ferrol estuary on 5 December 2014. Order No. DEF/1564/2015 was published in the Official State Gazette on 26 June 2015, which names of these two ships as Audaz and Furor.

On 29 April 2016, the first of the ship's blocks was placed on a grade. Its delivery to the Spanish Navy is scheduled for 2018. The launching of the ship has been delayed several times due to labor conflicts with the employees of Navantia. The launch planned for July 2017 and, after three attempts, was postponed in early September and, due to new conflicts, the launch was delayed a few weeks, scheduled for mid or late that month. Finally, the sixth ship of the class, called Furor, was launched on 8 September 2017, in a private act (something atypical, as they are usually launched in a public act) and without being finished the structure, since the superstructure is not yet assembled. The ship was commissioned on 21 January 2019.

On 6 May 2020, HMS Sabre (P285) tried to ward off Furor, which was making an illegal incursion into what Gibraltar consider its territorial waters, playing the Spanish National Anthem on Radio Channel Ch16.

On 24 September 2025, the Spanish government approved its deployment to Gaza in support and assistance of the Global Sumud Flotilla, which reported that it was suffering various drone attacks. The Spanish ship will also join the Italian Navy frigate Virginio Fasan (F 591).
