= Spanish patrol vessel Meteoro =

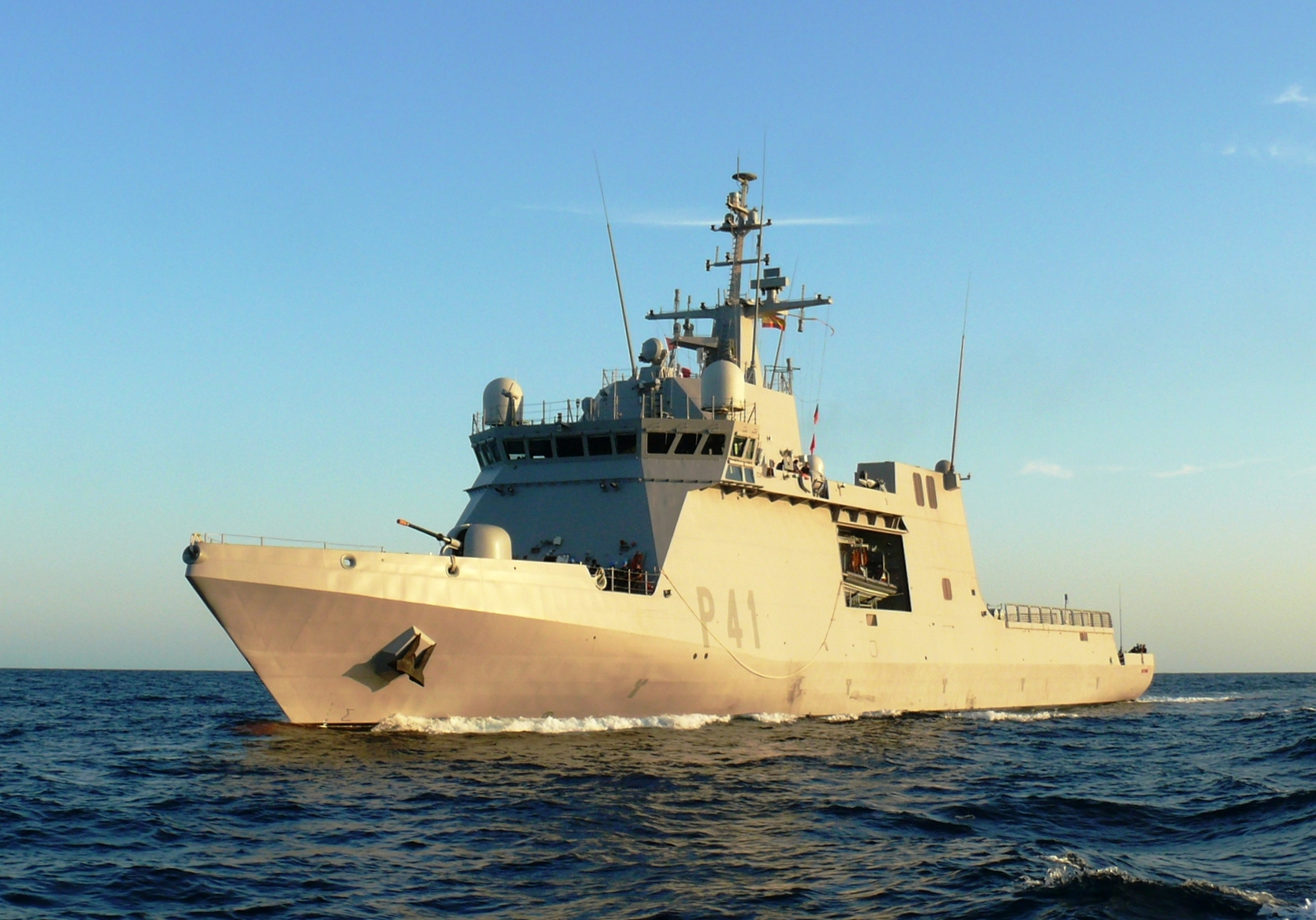
- Meteoro (P-41)

History

Spain
- Name: Meteoro
- Ordered: 31 July 2006
- Builder: NAVANTIA
- Cost: €166.74m (US$224m)
- Laid down: 4 October 2007
- Launched: 16 October 2009
- Commissioned: 28 July 2011
- Home port: Las Palmas Naval Base
- Identification: pennant number: P-41
- Status: In active service

General characteristics
- Class & type: Meteoro class BAM
- Displacement: 2860 tons full load
- Length: 93.9 metres (308 ft)
- Beam: 14.2 metres (47 ft)
- Draft: 4.2 metres (14 ft)
- Propulsion: 2 diesel engines; 4 groups diesel generators; 2 electric motors propellers; 1 Emergency generator; Located 2 cross bow thruster
- Speed: 20 knots (37 km/h; 23 mph)
- Range: 3,500 nautical miles (6,500 km; 4,000 mi)
- Complement: 46 crew and 30 forces
- Armament: 1 cannon 76 mm/62 gun; 2 x 25 mm automatic mountings; 2 × 12.7 mm machine guns
- Aircraft carried: 1 × NH-90

Meteoro (P-41) is the lead ship of the Meteoro class, a new kind of offshore patrol vessel created for the Spanish Navy and called BAMs.

== Operational history ==
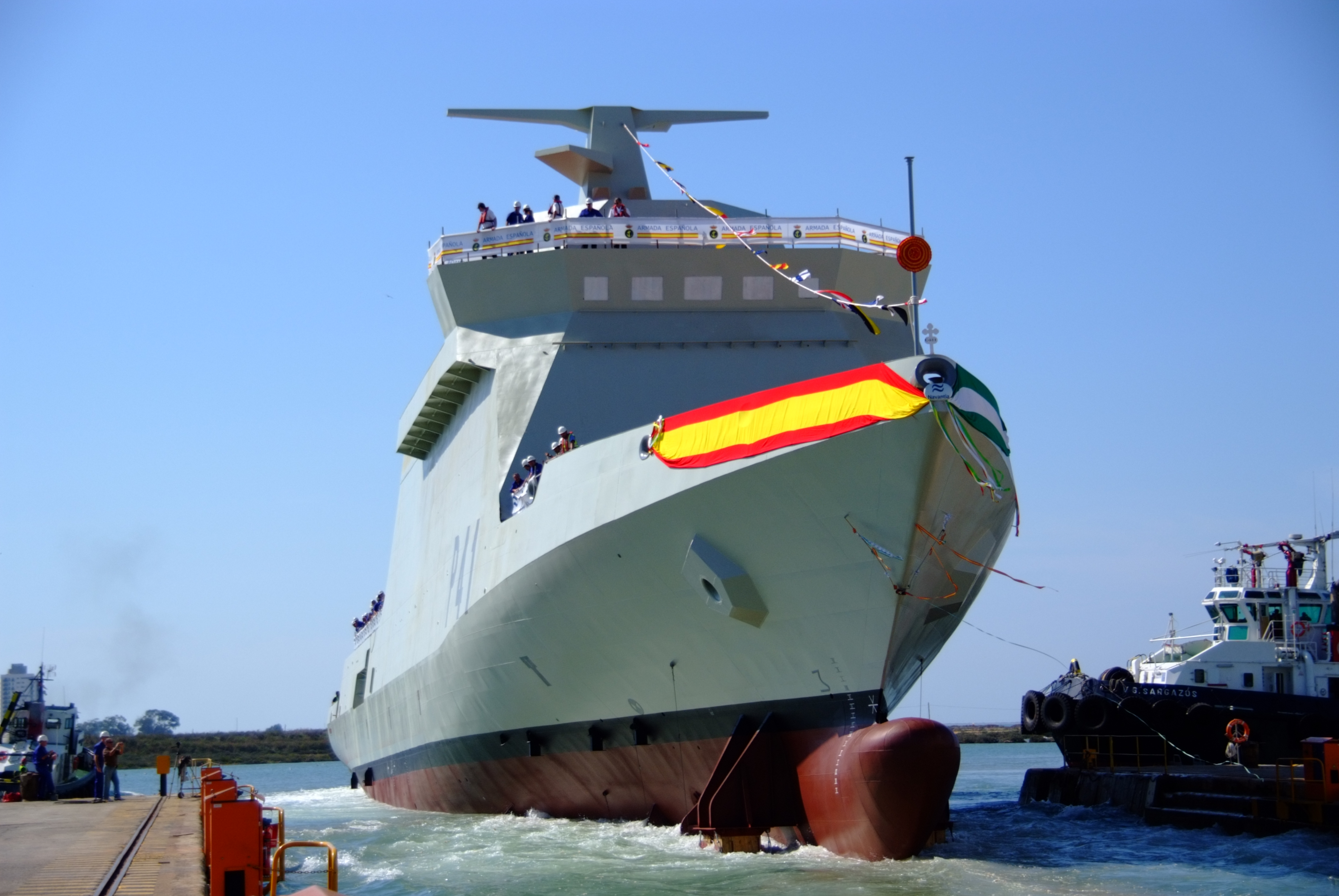
Launching of Meteoro's at San Fernando

Construction began on October 4, 2007, with the cutting of the first sheet and the keel was placed on the stand on March 13, 2009, in the shipyard of San Fernando.

She was launched on Friday, October 16, 2009, sponsored by Minister of Economy Elena Salgado, with the anecdote that the ship slid down the stage 11 minutes before the scheduled time, when the ceremony had just begun.
On Friday, January 28, 2011, she successfully completed her sea trials in the Bay of Cadiz waters, prior to its delivery to the Navy, completing her last tests in July 2011. While carrying out minor repairs at the San Fernando shipyard, a soldier was found dead inside of the ship with a shot in the head. She was handed to the navy at the base of Rota in the presence of Defense Minister Carme Chacón on July 28, 2011.

Under the command of Captain David Fernández-Portal Díaz del Rio, on August 22, she arrived in the military arsenal of Las Palmas de Gran Canaria, where she remained until September 5, when she returned to the peninsula to begin the certification of her Equipment and systems. In October 2011, she traveled to Cartagena for evaluation and training of the crew, then going to Alicante, arriving on November 4, where the Prince of Asturias attended the next day At the exit of the Volvo Ocean Race, indicated by means of a cannon salvo of the Meteoro, after which she went to the city, to participate in the events of 50th edition of the Nautical Week of Barcelona. After finalizing the Nautical Week of Barcelona, went to the Naval Military School of Marín, where she arrived on 23 November to carry out various tests there, and to sail from there the next day.

She finished her cruise of resistance by the Atlantic Ocean and the Mediterranean Sea on 19 December 2011, when she arrived at her base in the Arsenal of Las Palmas, after having touched, in addition to the ports already mentioned, Lisbon, Vigo, Palma de Mallorca, Mahón And Algiers, where she was visited by 40 officers of the Algerian Navy.

On June 7, she returned to her base in Las Palmas de Gran Canaria after completing a period of operational qualifications and training, now being considered as fully operational.

On July 17, 2013, she sailed from her base in Las Palmas de Gran Canaria to join Operation Atalanta to fight piracy in the Indian Ocean, replacing Numancia, in an expected deployment of four months. Between December 1 and 3, she was relieved in Djibouti by Tornado, to begin her return journey to Spain, and arrive at her base in Las Palmas on December 22, 2013,

On March 20, 2014, while participating in a routine exercise of cargo hoisting some 23 miles southwest of Fuerteventura, a Super-Puma helicopter of the Air Rescue Service of the Air Force 802 squadron crashed in the middle of an exercise. Meteoro was able to rescue one of the 5 crew members of the aircraft. On April 21, 2014, she participated in search and rescue tasks, participating in the company Phoenix International and the bodies of two of her crew, as well as the Transfer of the aforementioned mortal remains to the Arsenal of Las Palmas.

In April 2015 she participated in the cleaning of oil spills in the Canary Islands, caused by the sinking of the Russian fishing vessel Oleg Naydenov. During the night of 16 to 17 of May, 2015 she participated in the arrest of a former fishing vessel, which carried 1800 kg of cocaine on board.

In August 2015 she joined the twenty-first rotation of the Atalanta anti-piracy operation in Indian waters. At the end of November, she set out on a return trip to Spain, calling at the ports of Dar es Salaam, Tanzania, Cape Town (South Africa) and Luanda (Angola).

In January 2022, amid the Russo-Ukrainian crisis, the Meteoro was deployed in the Black Sea to reinforce NATO forces along with the frigate Blas de Lezo (F103).
