= MV Flevoborg =

Cargo ship registered in the Netherlands

History
- Name: Flevoborg
- Operator: Wagenborg Shipping
- Port of registry: (Netherlands) Delfzijl
- Builder: Ferus Smit, Leer
- Yard number: 392
- Completed: March 2010
- Identification: IMO number: 9419292
- Status: In active service

General characteristics
- Type: Cargo ship
- Tonnage: 8,911 GT; 14,596 DWT; 4,419 NT
- Length: 154.6 m (507.2 ft)
- Beam: 17.2 m (56.4 ft)
- Propulsion: 1 × propeller, bow thruster; 1 × Wärtsilä 9L32C diesel engine
- Speed: 12 knots (22 km/h; 14 mph)
- Capacity: 606.781 m^{3} (21,428.3 cu ft)

MV Flevoborg is a cargo ship registered in the Netherlands and operated by Wagenborg. Completed in 2010, Flevoborg ran aground in the St. Lawrence River off Sainte-Croix, Quebec in 2017.

== Description ==
Flevoborg has a 8,911 gross tonnage (GT), a 4,419 net tonnage (NT) and 14,596 tons deadweight (DWT). The vessel is 154.6 metres (507.2 ft) long overall with a beam of 17.2 metres (56.4 ft). Flevoborg is powered by a Wärtsilä 9L32C diesel engine driving one propeller rated at 4,500 kilowatts (6,000 hp) at 750 rpm and one bow thruster rated at 640 kW (860 hp). This gives the vessel a maximum speed of 12 knots (22 km/h; 14 mph). The vessel has two holds and has a capacity of 606,781 cu ft (17,182.1 m^{3}) grain/bale.

== Service history ==
Constructed by Ferus Smit in Leer, Germany with the yard number 392, the ship was completed in March 2010. Flevoborg is registered in the Netherlands with its home port at Delfzijl and operated by Wagenborg Shipping. On 21 June 2017, Flevoborg lost power while transiting the Saint Lawrence River. The vessel was taking a cargo of corn from Montreal and was off Sainte-Croix, Quebec when it ran aground. The vessel was re-floated by changing the levels of water in the ballast and the rising tide. The engine did not restart and tugboats arrived to tow Flevoborg to Quebec City, arriving on 22 June to undergo inspection and repairs. While aground, the vessel had been out of the main channel and no oil leaked.
