= Boskalis =

Dutch dredging and heavylift company

Royal Boskalis B.V.

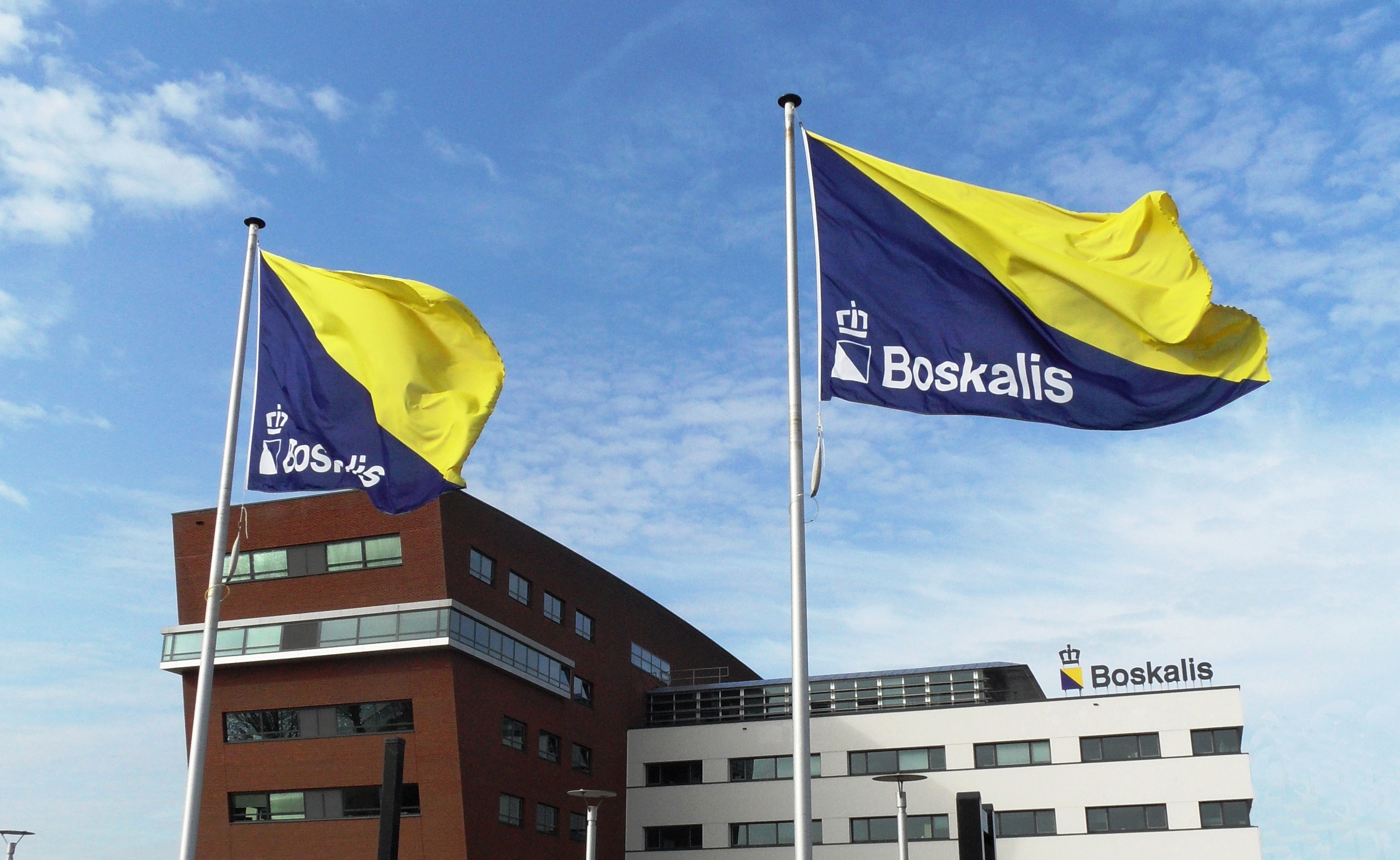
- Type: Besloten vennootschap
- Industry: Construction, services
- Founded: 1910; 116 years ago
- Founder: Johannes Kraaijeveld; Eliza van Noordenne
- Headquarters: Papendrecht, Netherlands
- Key people: Peter Berdowski (CEO), Herman Hazewinkel (Chairman of the supervisory board)
- Products: Dredging, land reclamation, maritime infrastructure, offshore construction
- Revenue: €4.362 billion (2024)
- Operating income: €782 million (2024)
- Net income: €781 million (2024)
- Total assets: €4.890 billion (2024)
- Total equity: €3.790 billion (2024)
- Number of employees: 11,683 (2024)
- Parent: HAL Investments
- Website: www.boskalis.com

Royal Boskalis B.V. (Dutch: Koninklijke Boskalis B.V.) is a Dutch dredging and heavylift company that provides services relating to the construction and maintenance of maritime infrastructure internationally. The company has one of the world's largest dredging fleets and owns Smit International. In 2010, Dockwise, a large heavy-lift shipping company, was merged into Boskalis.

As of 2020, Boskalis employs around 9,900 employees and 650 ships. They operate in over 75 countries in six continents.

== History ==
Boskalis (Bos & Kalis) was founded as Johannes Kraaijeveld en van Noordenne in 1910 by Johannes Kraaijeveld and Eliza van Noordenne. During the 1930s, it was renamed NV Baggermaatschappij Bos & Kalis when Gerrit Jan Bos, Wilhelm Bos, Egbertus Dingeman Kalis and Kobus Kalis took over. Throughout much of the interwar period, Boskalis played a major role in the Zuiderzee project. In 1931, the company signed a contract for the dredging of Bromborough Dock. In 1933, Boskalis partnered with the Westminster Dredging Company (based in Fareham, England), which opened business opportunities with West Africa.

In 1970, Boskalis became a public company. during 1978, Boskalis received the designation "Royal". In the 1980s, economic and political circumstances compelled Boskalis to concentrate on its core dredging business.

Throughout the 1990s, the company embarked on a series of acquisitions, such as its purchase of a 40% interest in rival firm Archirodon Group. During this period, Boskalis was also involved in several major land reclamation projects. In Hong Kong, the company worked on the major land reclamation project for the new Chek Lap Kok airport, while in Singapore it cooperated on a multi-year development program. Addition work during this decade included its involvement in the construction of a gas and container port at Ras Laffan, Qatar.

During 2000, Boskalis and the Dutch maritime construction firm Hollandsche Beton Groep (HBG) explored multiple avenues aimed at bringing together or merging the two businesses, ranging from a hostile takeover to even agreeing terms from a friendly transaction. However, even though the European Commission cleared such a deal to proceed, it did not come to fruition, allegedly due to disagreements over the proposed combined enterprise's direction. It was speculated that such an arrangement would have created the market leader in the Benelux region (in terms of turnover) as well as one of the five largest European construction companies.

=== Since 2000 ===
By 2007, the company was engaged in two major contracts in Australia — a €300 million contract to deepen the shipping channels of Port Phillip in Melbourne, utilising its dredge the Queen of the Netherlands, and a €50 million contract to expand the harbour at Newcastle. The company was also undertaking a €1.1 billion contract to develop a new port in Abu Dhabi.

On 15 September 2008, Boskalis offered €1.11 billion for fellow Dutch maritime company Smit International. Despite the offer being promptly rejected by Smit's board, Boskalis subsequently built a stake of over 25% in the firm and expressed a continuing desire to buy a number of its business units. A revised offer of €1.35 billion was accepted by Smit in January 2010, with Boskalis declaring its offer unconditional that March.

During early 2011, Boskalis acquired the Dutch-based civil engineering firm MNO Vervat. In April 2013, Boskalis acquired the Dutch marine transport company Dockwise. That same year, Boskalis completed the sale of its 40 percent stake in Archirodon Group in exchange for $190 million.

In October 2014, Egypt signed a $1.5 billion contract with Boskalis, alongside five other multinational firms, to carry out dredging in connection with the expansion of the Suez Canal. During late March 2021, a pair of Boskalis tugboats assisted the eleven Egyptian tugs in the dredging and towing operation to free the 400-metre long ship Ever Given, which ran aground in the Suez Canal and got stuck diagonally, therefore blocked the canal between 23 and 29 March 2021, during which time the canal was impassable.

Boskalis has played a key role in the delivery of numerous offshore wind power generation schemes, in particular the use of cable-laying ships to connect such farms to land-based energy grids. By 2024, half of the company's offshore energy revenues were being generated from work related to offshore wind farms.

During 2019, Boskalis announced its intention to divest its worldwide harbor towage interests. Accordingly, the firm sold its stakes in Saam Smit Towage (which operated primarily in Central and South America), Kotug Smith Towage (which operated in Northern Europe), and Keppel Smit Towage, a joint venture with Keppel Offshore in Singapore.

In early 2022, HAL Investments approached Boskalis with an offer to purchase the latter; this deal valued the firm at €4.3 billion. As a result of the completion of this transaction, under which HAL Investments obtained in excess of 95 percent of all shares in the Boskalis, the latter was delisted from Euronext Amsterdam.

During the early 2020s, Boskalis has been one of several companies working on Malmporten, Sweden’s largest dredging projects in recent decades.

The New Manila International Airport has been the largest land reclamation project in Boskalis’ dredging history on the coastal areas 35 km north of the capital Manila. On 15 September 2023, Boskalis’ Group Director, Pim van der Knaap, accepted the International Association of Dredging Companies Safety Award 2023 from IADC’s President Frank Verhoeven for the new and improved waterbox, used for sandfill areas.

== Controversies ==
During the early 2010s, Boskalis was publicly accused of bribing Mauritian officials in order to obtain certain contracts in the nation. In October 2013, the company was fined by a Mauritian court.

== See also ==
- Shoalway
- Dockwise Vanguard
- Gulhifalhu
