= Shoalway =

Trailing suction hopper dredger

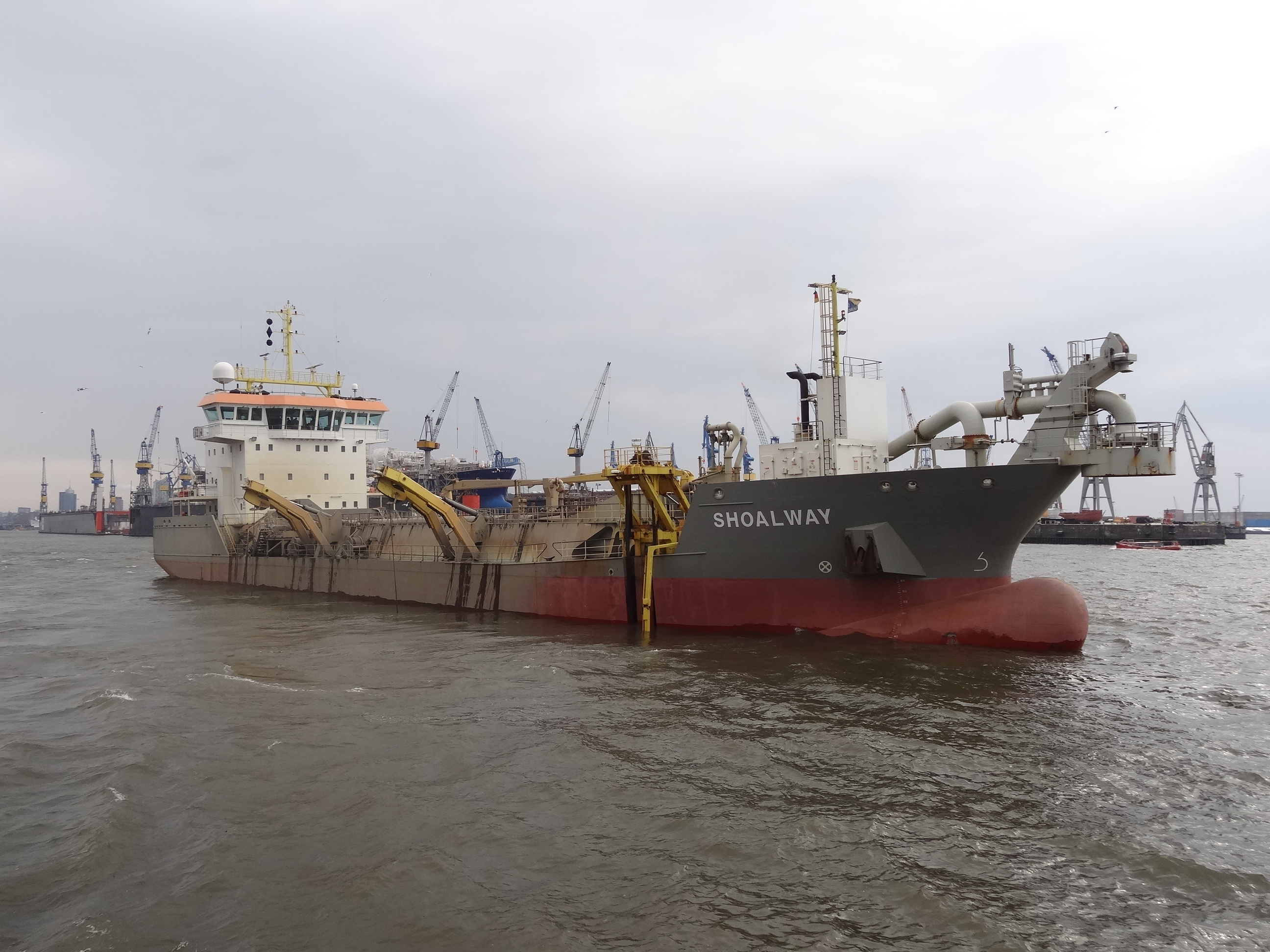
- Shoalway in Hamburg, March 2013

History
- Name: Shoalway
- Owner: Royal Boskalis
- Operator: Royal Boskalis
- Port of registry: Limassol, Cyprus
- Builder: Intervak Scheepswerf & Constructie b.v, Harlingen, Netherlands
- Yard number: 221
- Laid down: 2008
- Launched: 23 November 2009
- Christened: 30 April 2010
- Completed: 2010
- Maiden voyage: Greenock
- In service: 23 April 2010
- Identification: Call sign: 5BYP2; IMO number: 9556337; MMSI number: 212115000
- Status: In service

General characteristics
- Class & type: Shoalway-class
- Type: Dredger
- Tonnage: 4,088 GT
- Length: 90 m (295 ft 3 in) LOA
- Beam: 19 m (62 ft 4 in)
- Draught: Summer: 5.933 m (19 ft 5.6 in); Dredging: 6.820 m (22 ft 4.5 in)
- Depth: 7.25 m (23 ft 9 in) moulded
- Decks: 6
- Installed power: 6,666 kW (8,939 hp) @ 1600 rev/min
- Propulsion: Azimuth thrusters with Caterpillar Inc. 3516B 1,491 kW (1,999 hp) x2 & Caterpillar Inc. 3406C 229 kW (307 hp) & Veth 2-K-1400 500 kW (670 hp) bow thruster
- Speed: 11 kn (20 km/h)
- Capacity: 4500 m3
- Crew: 10

The Shoalway is a trailing suction hopper dredger, owned and operated by Royal Boskalis, originally intended for the British market and built in 2010.

== Design ==
The vessel was the first of four ships designed by Conoship International and D.W. den Herder maritiem, with a shallow draught and high manoeuvrability for difficult port construction, maintenance, land reclamation, coastal defense and offshore energy projects. The typical carpentry needed for a vessel of this kind was completed by Hans Dorgelo. It was the first dredger in the Boskalis fleet to use azimuth thrusters as its main means of propulsion. The ship is equipped with rainbow discharge valves for beach replenishment or land reclamation, two jet water engines for sediment dispersal, non-protruding bottom doors in the hopper (cargo hold) for dumping at sea and engines designed to stringent MARPOL sulphur emissions standards.

== Capabilities ==
Equipped with a suction pipe with a diameter of 900 mm (2 ft 11 in), a dredge pump of 1,680 kW (2,250 hp), two jet pumps of 746 kW (1,000 hp) and a maximum dredging depth of 30 m (98 ft 5 in) the ship is able to pump its load ashore by pipeline, dumping or rainbowing.

== Sister Vessels ==
Its sister vessels of the Shoalway class include the Causeway, the Strandway and the Freeway.
