= MV Pacific Egret =

Ship built in 2010

History

United Kingdom
- Name: Pacific Egret
- Owner: Pacific Nuclear Transport Ltd
- Builder: Mitsui Engineering and Shipbuilding, Tamano
- Launched: 12 January 2010
- Home port: Barrow-in-Furness
- Identification: IMO number: 9464871; MMSI number: 235076846; Callsign: 2CYF9
- Status: In service

General characteristics
- Class & type: INF Class 3 vessel
- Tonnage: 6776 GT
- Length: 103.9 m

Pacific Egret is an INF Class 3 nuclear waste carrier launched in January 2010.

== Construction ==
Pacific Egret was built by Mitsui Engineering and Shipbuilding, Tamano, Japan. She was launched on 12 January 2010. Her homeport is Barrow in Furness, Cumbria.

It was purpose-built to carry plutonium, highly enriched uranium and mixed-oxide nuclear fuel. It is fitted with naval guns, cannons and other means of repelling assaults.
