= Madrid Express =

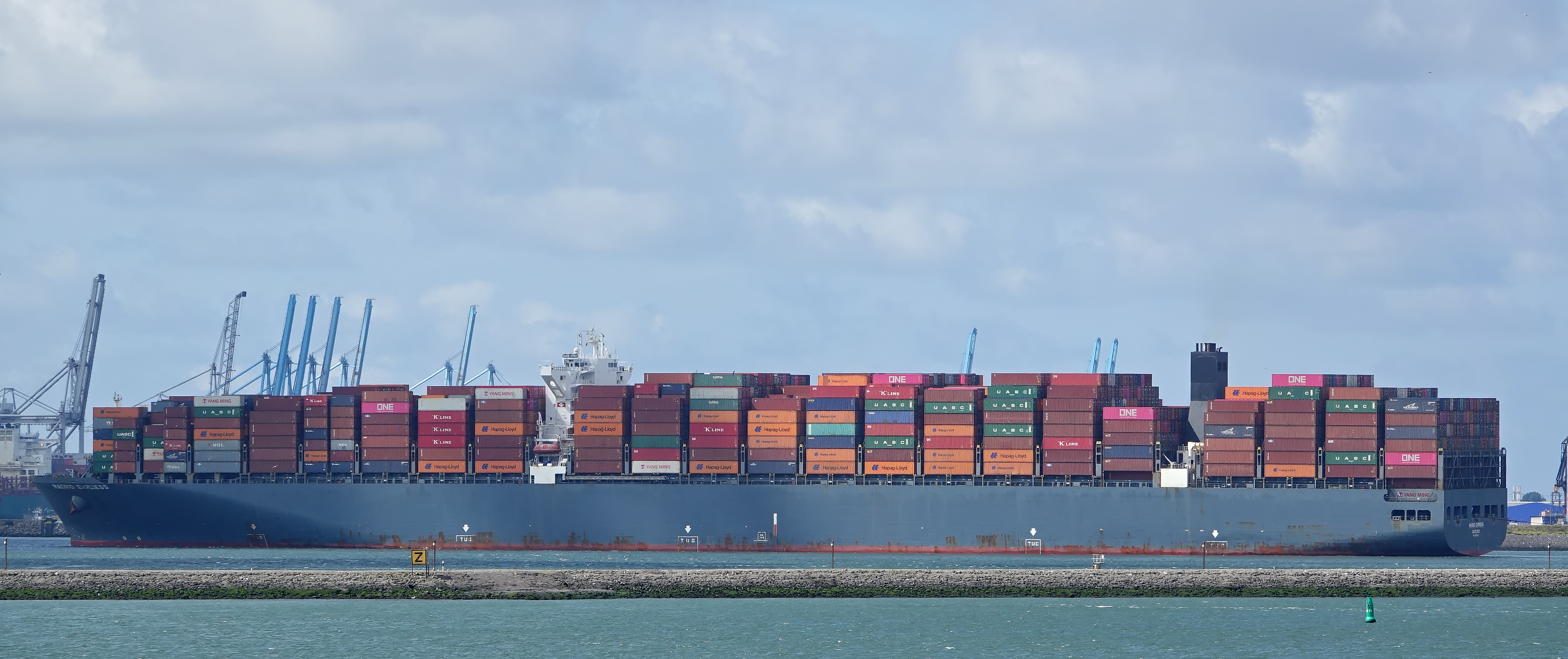
- Madrid Express in the Port of Rotterdam

History
- Name: MSC Fabiola (2010-2019); Madrid Express (2019-present)
- Owner: SPDB Financial Leasing
- Operator: Mediterranean Shipping Company (2010-2019); Hapag-Lloyd (2019-present)
- Port of registry: Hong Kong, Hong Kong
- Builder: Samsung Heavy Industries; Geoje, South Korea
- Yard number: 1793
- Laid down: January 11, 2010
- Launched: April 1, 2010
- Completed: December 29, 2010
- In service: 2010
- Identification: Call sign: CQDV; IMO number: 9447847; MMSI number: 636092019
- Status: In service

General characteristics
- Type: Container ship
- Tonnage: 140,259 GT; 75,664 NT; 146,092 DWT
- Length: 366.08 m (1,201.0 ft) overall; 350.85 m (1,151.1 ft) registered
- Beam: 48.20 m (158.1 ft)
- Draft: 15.500 m (50.85 ft) maximum
- Depth: 29.80 m (97.8 ft)
- Decks: Two continuous decks
- Installed power: 65,160 kW
- Speed: 25.40 knots (47.04 km/h; 29.23 mph) maximum; 19.9 knots (36.9 km/h; 22.9 mph) cruise
- Capacity: 12,562 TEU
- Crew: 34

Madrid Express (originally MSC Fabiola) is a container ship built for the Hamburg based Peter Döhle Schiffahrtsgesellschaft by Samsung Heavy Industries in South Korea. The ship was initially chartered by the Mediterranean Shipping Company (MSC) as the MSC Fabiola. From 2019 onwards the ship was chartered to Hapag-Lloyd as the Madrid Express. In 2012 the MSC Fabiola became the largest container ship to ever dock in North America, and the largest ship to enter the San Francisco Bay.

MSC Fabiola is the first of a series of identical sister ships. The other three are MSC Faustina, MSC Fillippa, and MSC Filomena.

== Operational history ==
In March 2012 the ship shifted from its initial Asia-to-Europe service to begin trans-Pacific service. On March 16, 2012, MSC Fabiola docked at the Port of Long Beach, breaking earlier records for the largest container ship at a U.S. port, and at any North American port.

At the first U.S. stop in Long Beach, California, the ship was too tall to fit under the Gerald Desmond Bridge and dock at MSC's own terminal, so the Hanjin terminal was used instead. Two days later, MSC Fabiola passed under the Golden Gate Bridge to become the largest ship to enter the San Francisco Bay. The ship docked at the Port of Oakland. MSC Fabiola takes about 18 days to cross the Pacific Ocean from California to China.

The presence of the MSC Fabiola at the Port of Oakland is the result of a 12-year harbor-deepening project that was largely completed in September 2009. Prior to the arrival of MSC Fabiola, the Port of Oakland prepared by checking channel depth and dredging as needed. San Francisco Bay pilots trained for the visit on a simulator at the California Maritime Academy for over a year. The ship arrived drawing less than its full draft of 50 feet 10 inches (15.5 m) because it held only three-quarters of a load after its stop in Long Beach.

=== 2016 Suez Canal grounding ===
On April 28, 2016, MSC Fabiola ran aground at Great Bitter Lake in the Suez Canal after experiencing engine problems, forcing canal officials to temporarily suspend all northbound convoys and stop all southbound convoys in the canal. MSC Fabiola was refloated on April 30, resuming her southbound journey through the canal, being escorted by five tugboats.
