= Spanish patrol vessel Relámpago =

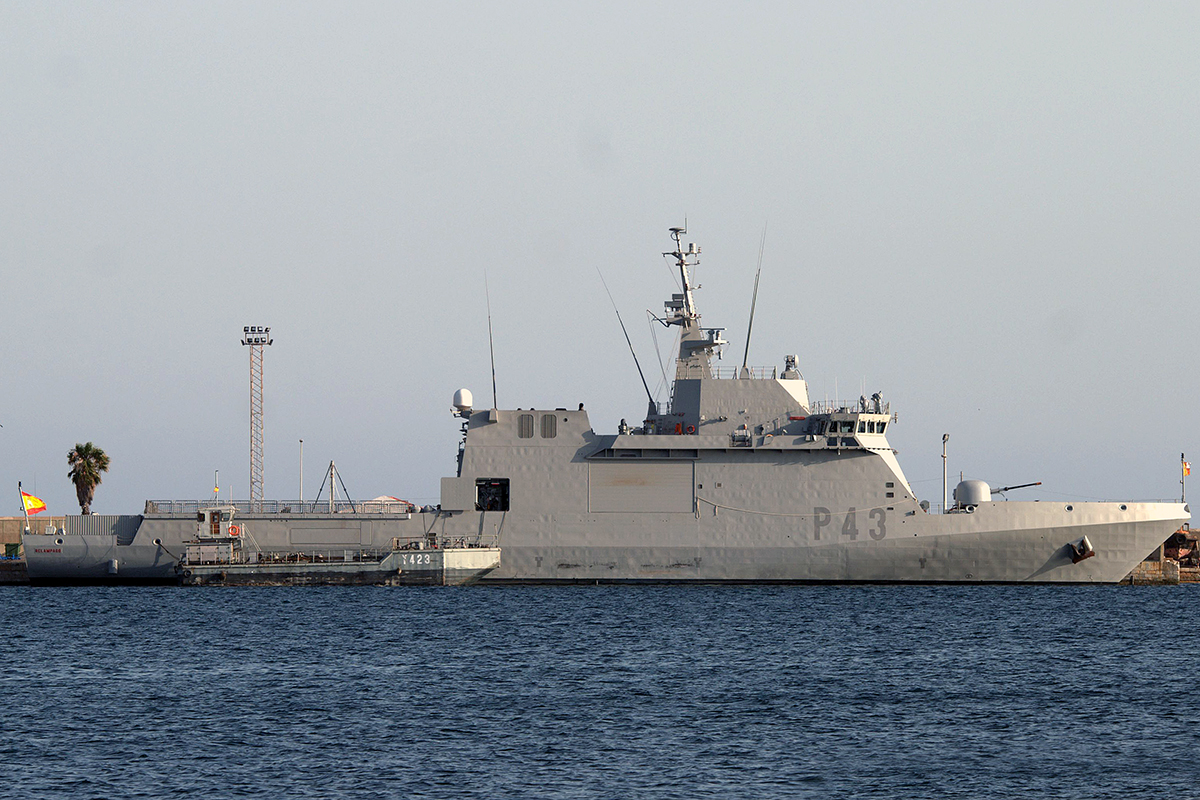
- Relámpago (P-43)

History

Spain
- Name: Relámpago
- Ordered: 31 July 2006
- Builder: NAVANTIA
- Cost: €166.74m (US$224m)
- Laid down: 17 December 2009
- Launched: 6 October 2010
- Commissioned: 6 February 2012
- Decommissioned: In active service
- Home port: Las Palmas Naval Base
- Identification: pennant number: P-43

General characteristics
- Class & type: Meteoro class BAM
- Displacement: 2860 tons full load
- Length: 93.9 metres (308 ft)
- Beam: 14.2 metres (47 ft)
- Draft: 4.2 metres (14 ft)
- Propulsion: 2 diesel engines; 4 groups diesel generators; 2 electric motors propellers; 1 Emergency generator; Located 2 cross bow thruster
- Speed: 20 knots (37 km/h; 23 mph)
- Range: 3,500 nautical miles (6,500 km; 4,000 mi)
- Complement: 46 crew and 30 forces
- Armament: 1 cannon 76 mm/62 gun; 2 x 25 mm automatic mountings; 2 × 12.7 mm machine guns
- Aircraft carried: 1 × NH-90

Relámpago (P-43) is the third ship of the Meteoro class, a new kind of offshore patrol vessel created for the Spanish Navy and called BAMs.
