= Cartagena Naval Base =

Military base and arsenal of the Spanish Navy in the city of Cartagena

Coordinates: 37.6012°N 0.9926°W

- Arsenal de Cartagena
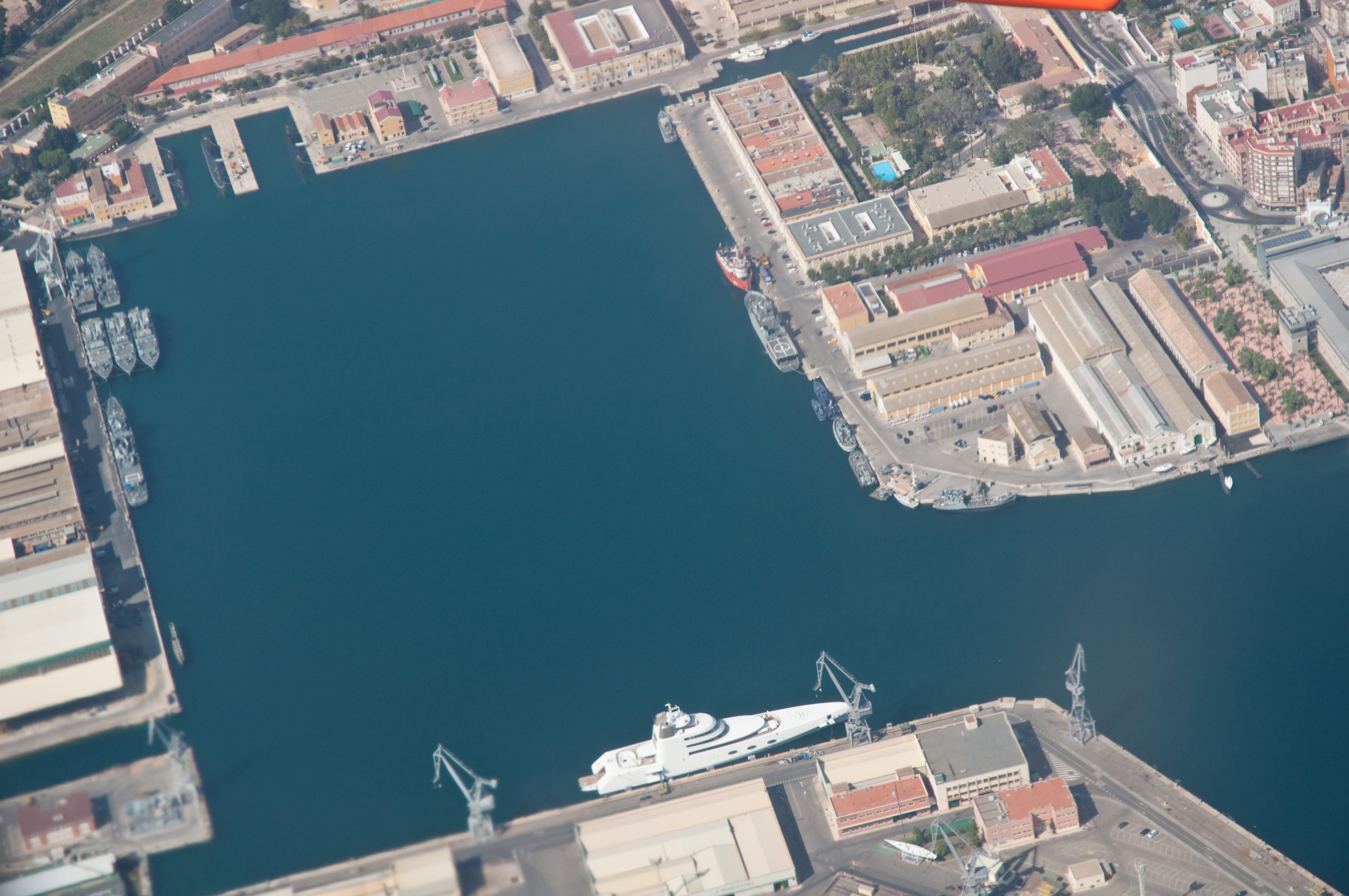

Site information
- Type: Naval base
- Owner: Spanish Ministry of Defence
- Operator: Spanish Navy
- Condition: Operational

Site history
- Built: 1732–82
- Built by: Sebastián Feringán (1732–62); Mateo Vodopich (1762–82)
- In use: 1782 –present

Garrison information
- Current commander: Vice admiral Aniceto Rosique Nieto
- Occupants: See Ships

The Cartagena Naval Base, also known as the Arsenal of Cartagena, is a military base and arsenal of the Spanish Navy located in the city of Cartagena. It is one of the oldest naval bases in Spain, having been created in the 18th century. Located in the southeast of the Iberian Peninsula, it is the main Spanish base in the Mediterranean Sea.

== History ==
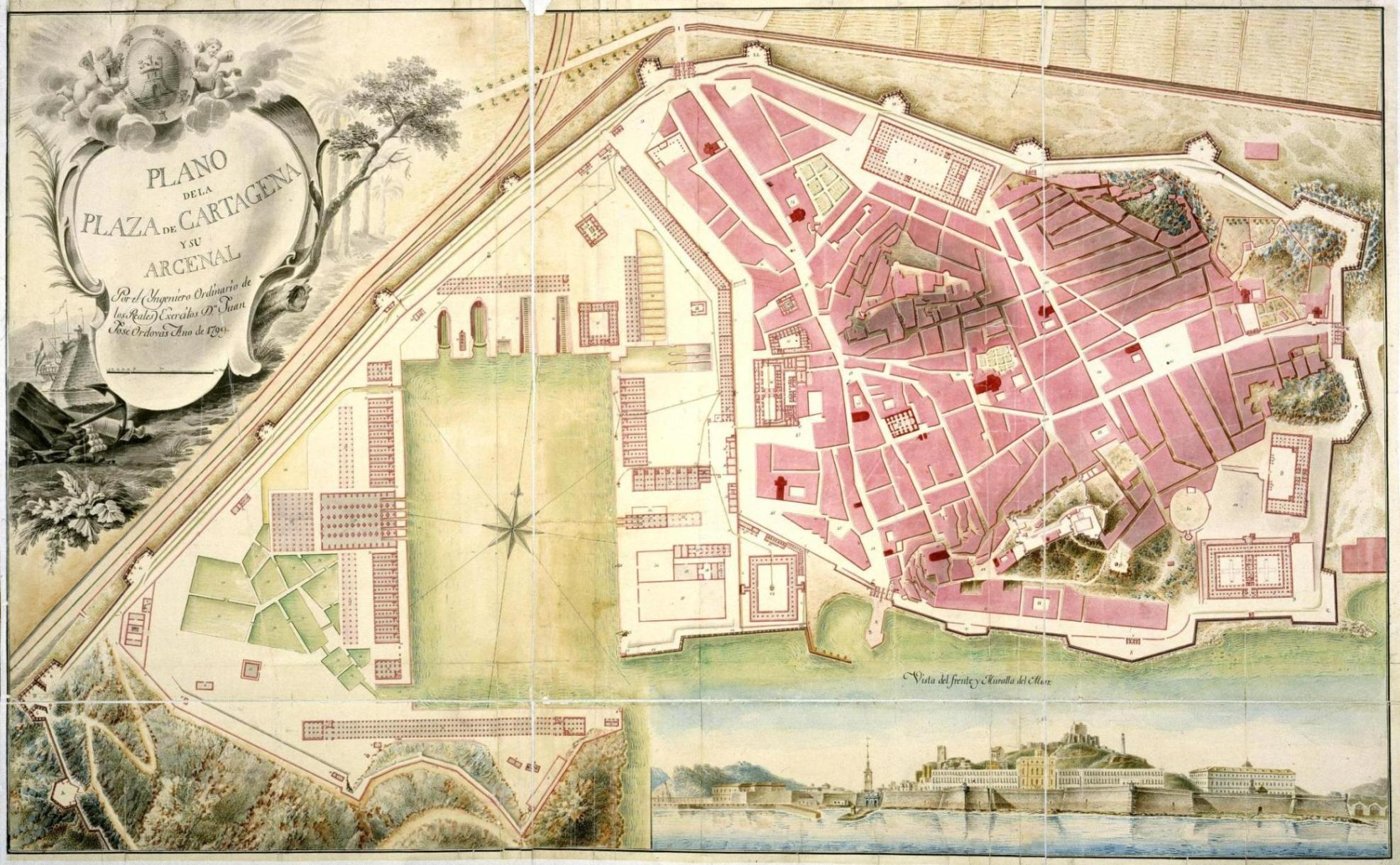
The Naval Base of Cartagena in 1799

The port of Cartagena, first founded by the Carthaginians in the 2nd century BC, occupies a strategic location on the Mediterranean Sea. It remained a commercial port until the reign of Philip V, when it was redeveloped as a major naval base alongside the expansion of the Spanish Navy.

Construction of the arsenal began in late 1731, and was completed in 1782, during the reign of Charles III. The final cost came to 112 million reales. The Cartagena naval base was a major industrial complex by the 18th century, with shipyards and workshops, carrying out carpentry, rigging and blacksmithing, as well as crafts and fine arts workshops to produce ship ornamentation and decoration. In the second half of the 18th century, 21 ships, 17 frigates and more than fifty brigs, xebecs, hulks, galleys, etc. were built there, as well as a large number of smaller vessels. The Arsenal employed several thousand people in the construction and the maintenance of the units of the Spanish Navy; the forced labour of slaves was also used in the Arsenal during the 18th century.

The Naval Base was enlarged during the reign of Isabel II in 1849. In 1866, the Cartagena Iron Drydock was launched and taken into use. It was a dry dock, but it also served to lift ships to three new horizontal slipways. In 1889, electricity was introduced into the arsenal. In 1918, the moats of the dry docks built by Feringán were developed as submarine docks, in which role they still serve.

== Ships ==
- Galerna-class submarines
  - Galerna
  - Mistral
  - Tramontana

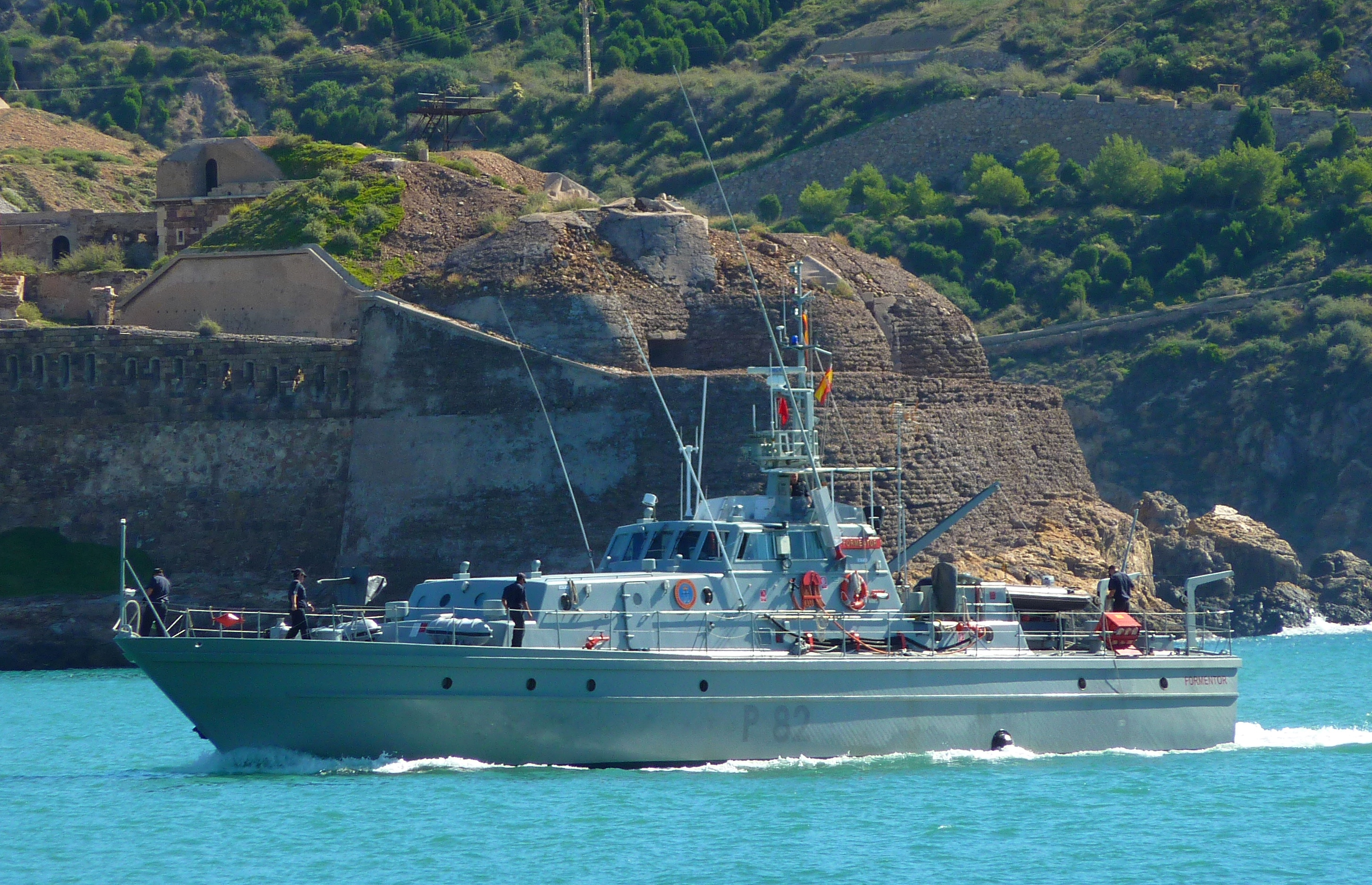
Formentor

- Segura-class minehunters
  - Segura
  - Sella
  - Tambre
  - Turia
  - Duero
  - Tajo

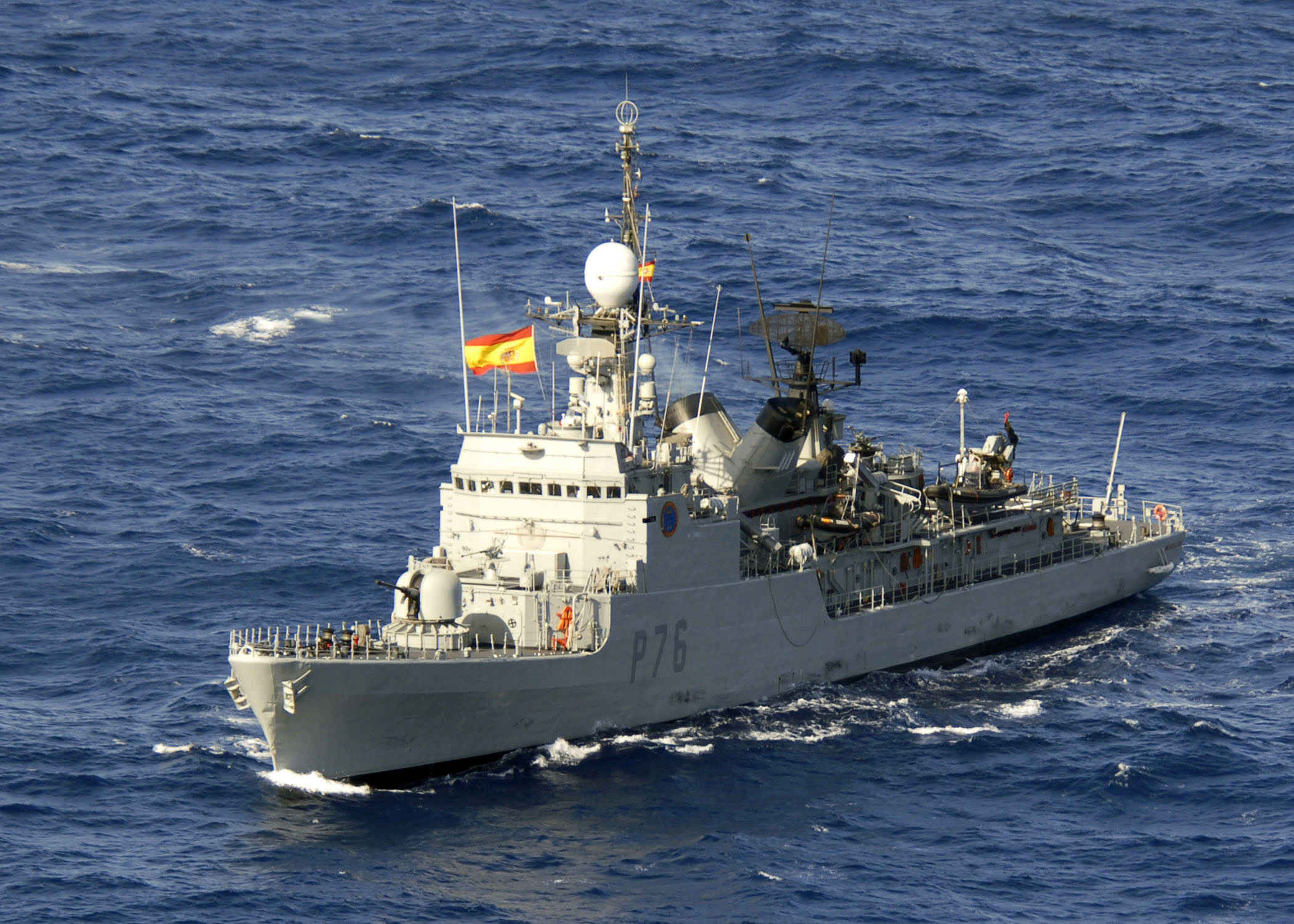
Infanta Elena

- Transport ships
  - Martín Posadillo (owned by the Spanish Army but operated by the Navy)
  - El Camino Español (owned by the Spanish Army but operated by the Navy)
- Polar research ships
  - BIO Hespérides
  - Las Palmas
- EW support ship
  - Alerta
- Chilreu-class patrol vessels
  - Alborán
  - Tarifa
- Descubierta-class corvettes

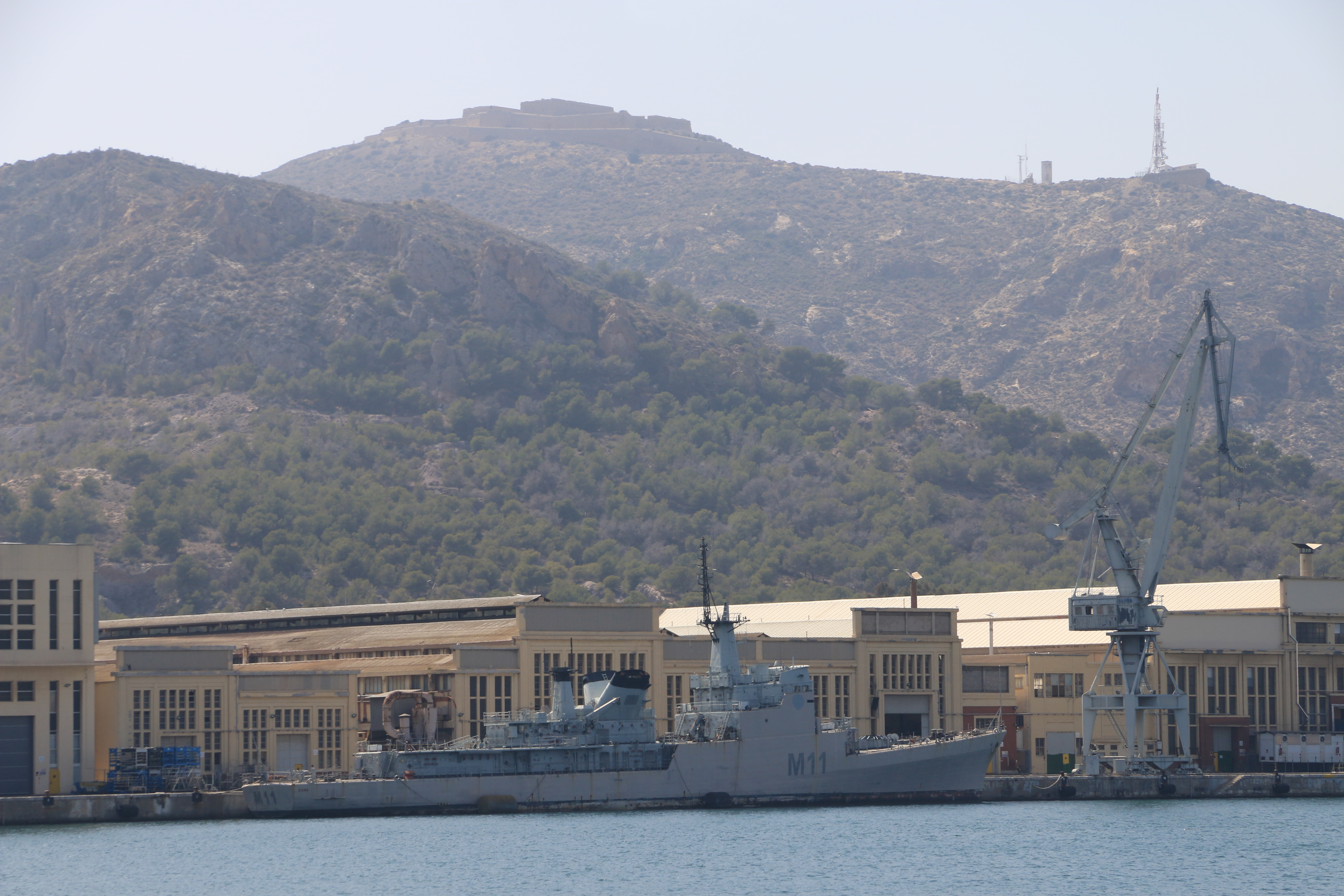
Diana (previously M-11) in Cartagena

  - Infanta Elena
  - Infanta Cristina
- Toralla-class patrol vessels
  - Toralla
  - Formentor
- Submarine rescue ships
  - Neptuno
- Meteoro-class offshore patrol vessel
  - Audaz
  - Furor

== See also ==
- Rota Naval Base
- Escuela Naval Militar
