= Spanish patrol vessel Tornado =

Offshore patrol vessel

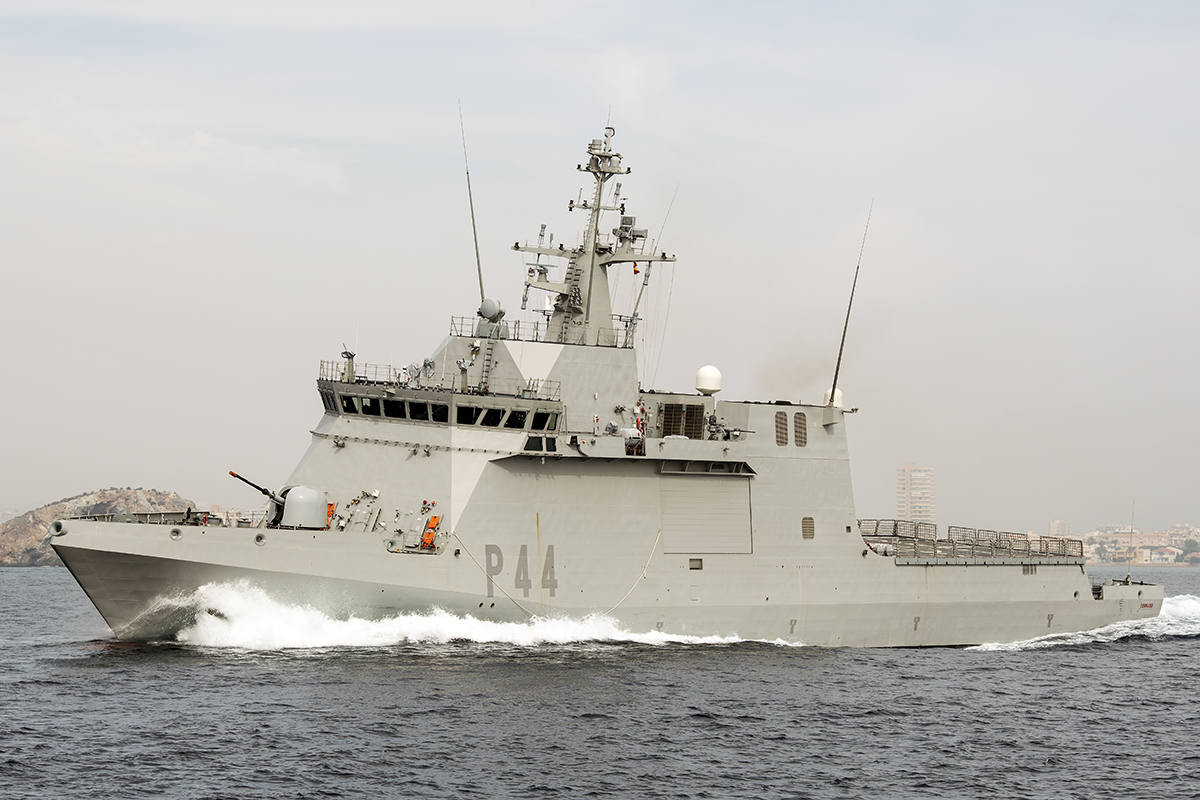
- Tornado (P-44)

History

Spain
- Name: Tornado
- Ordered: 31 July 2006
- Builder: NAVANTIA
- Cost: €166.74m (US$224m)
- Laid down: 5 May 2010
- Launched: 21 March 2011
- Commissioned: 19 July 2012
- Decommissioned: In active service
- Home port: Las Palmas Naval Base
- Identification: pennant number: P-44

General characteristics
- Class & type: Meteoro class BAM
- Displacement: 2860 tons full load
- Length: 93.9 metres (308 ft)
- Beam: 14.2 metres (47 ft)
- Draft: 4.2 metres (14 ft)
- Propulsion: 2 diesel engines; 4 groups diesel generators; 2 electric motors propellers; 1 Emergency generator; Located 2 cross bow thruster
- Speed: 20 knots (37 km/h; 23 mph)
- Range: 3,500 nautical miles (6,500 km; 4,000 mi)
- Complement: 46 crew and 30 forces
- Armament: 1 cannon 76 mm/62 gun; 2 x 25 mm automatic mountings; 2 × 12.7 mm machine guns
- Aircraft carried: 1 × NH-90

Tornado (P-44) is the fourth ship of the Meteoro class, a new kind of offshore patrol vessels created for the Spanish Navy and called BAMs.

Though normally based in the Canary Islands, as of October 2024 the patrol ship was assigned to carry out maritime security operations in Spanish waters off North Africa, near the Island of Alborán.
