= Spanish patrol vessel Rayo =

Spanish navy outpost ship

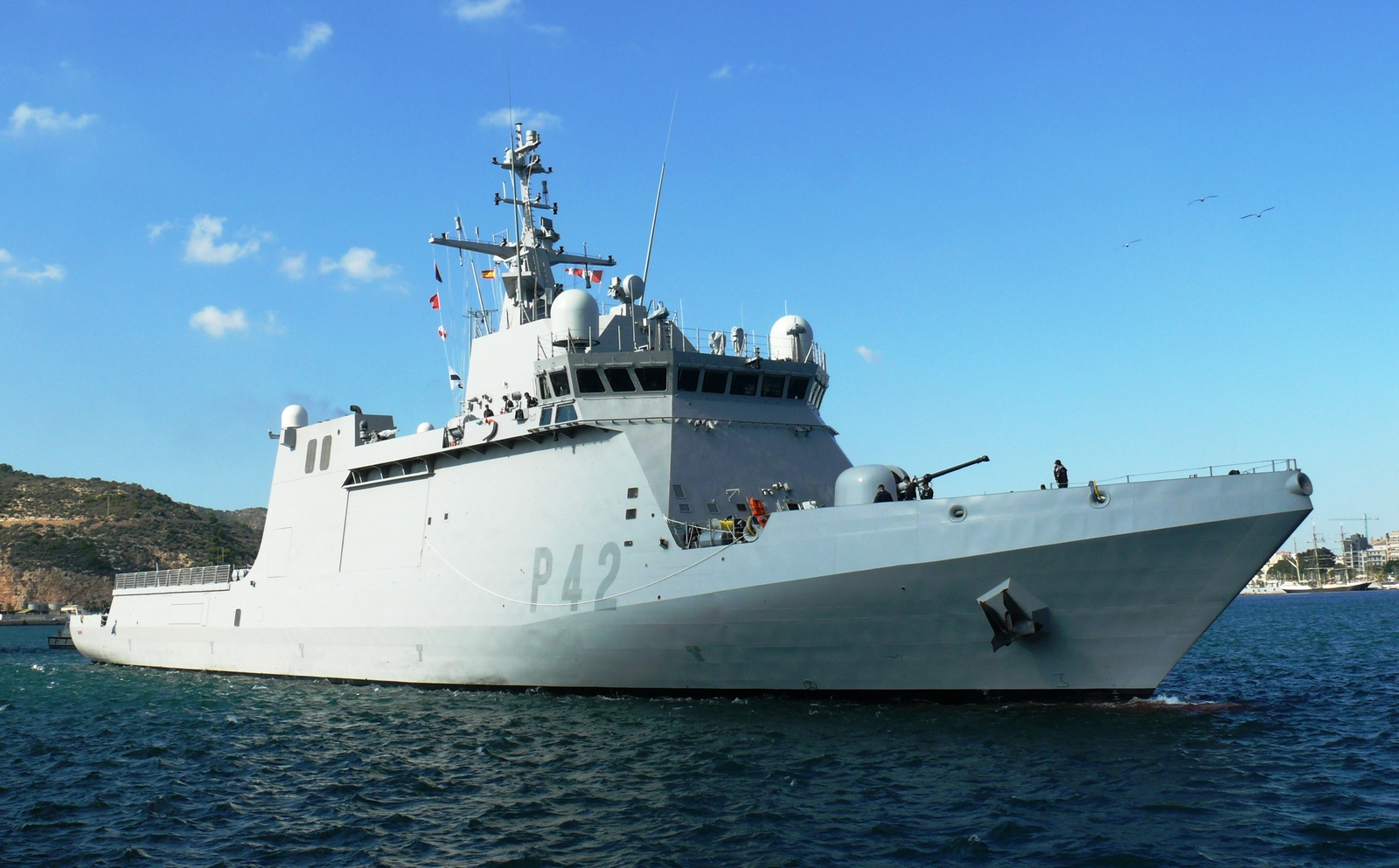
- Rayo (P-42)

History

Spain
- Name: Rayo
- Ordered: 31 July 2006
- Builder: NAVANTIA
- Cost: €166.74m (US$224m)
- Laid down: 3 September 2009
- Launched: 18 May 2010
- Commissioned: 26 October 2011
- Decommissioned: In active service
- Home port: Las Palmas Naval Base
- Identification: pennant number: P-42
- Status: In active service

General characteristics
- Class & type: Meteoro class BAM
- Displacement: 2860 tons full load
- Length: 93.9 metres (308 ft)
- Beam: 14.2 metres (47 ft)
- Draft: 4.2 metres (14 ft)
- Propulsion: 2 diesel engines; 4 groups diesel generators; 2 electric motors propellers; 1 Emergency generator; Located 2 cross bow thruster
- Speed: 20 knots (37 km/h; 23 mph)
- Range: 3,500 nautical miles (6,500 km; 4,000 mi)
- Complement: 46 crew and 30 forces
- Armament: 1 cannon 76 mm/62 gun; 2 x 25 mm automatic mountings; 2 × 12.7 mm machine guns
- Aircraft carried: 1 × NH-90

Rayo (P-42) is the second ship of the Meteoro class, a new kind of offshore patrol vessel created for the Spanish Navy and called BAMs.

== Operational history ==
It was laid down on September 3, 2009, at the Puerto Real-San Fernando shipyard.

It was launched on Tuesday, May 18, 2010, sponsored by Defense Minister Carme Chacón, after which, it continued its construction process afloat. Between May 27 and July 1, 2011, it performed its sea trials as far as the platform is concerned.

It was delivered to the Navy on October 26, 2011, at the naval base in Rota, in a ceremony chaired by Constantino Méndez, Secretary of State for Defense, and Manuel Rebollo, Admiral Chief of Staff of the Navy.

After arriving in Cartagena at the end of November, he arrived at his home port in the Arsenal of Las Palmas on December 20, 2011, where he remained until January 16, 2012, when he sailed to perform his resistance cruiser, in which carried out surveillance exercises, transshipment of weights and communications with the Atalaya (P-74) in the Alborán Sea, to go later to Palermo (Italy), where he made a stopover on January 23, 2012, subsequently sailing with destination to İzmir, Turkey.

In December 2013, it participated in the operation that led to the capture in waters near the Canary Islands of the Triton 2000 sailing vessel, carrying 550 kg of cocaine on board.

In December 2014 he relieved Navarra in the Atalanta operation to combat piracy in a deployment that has an estimated six months, deployment during which, personnel of the navy of Madagascar, to return to his base on May 26, 2015.

At the end of October 2015 participated in the tasks of rescue of a Superpuma Helicopter of the Service of Search and Rescue (SAR) of the Air Force that had crashed in the Atlantic while returning to Canarias and was in charge of the transfer of the bodies of the three members of the helicopter crew to Las Palmas de Gran Canaria.
