= Meteoro-class patrol vessel =

Spanish naval ship class

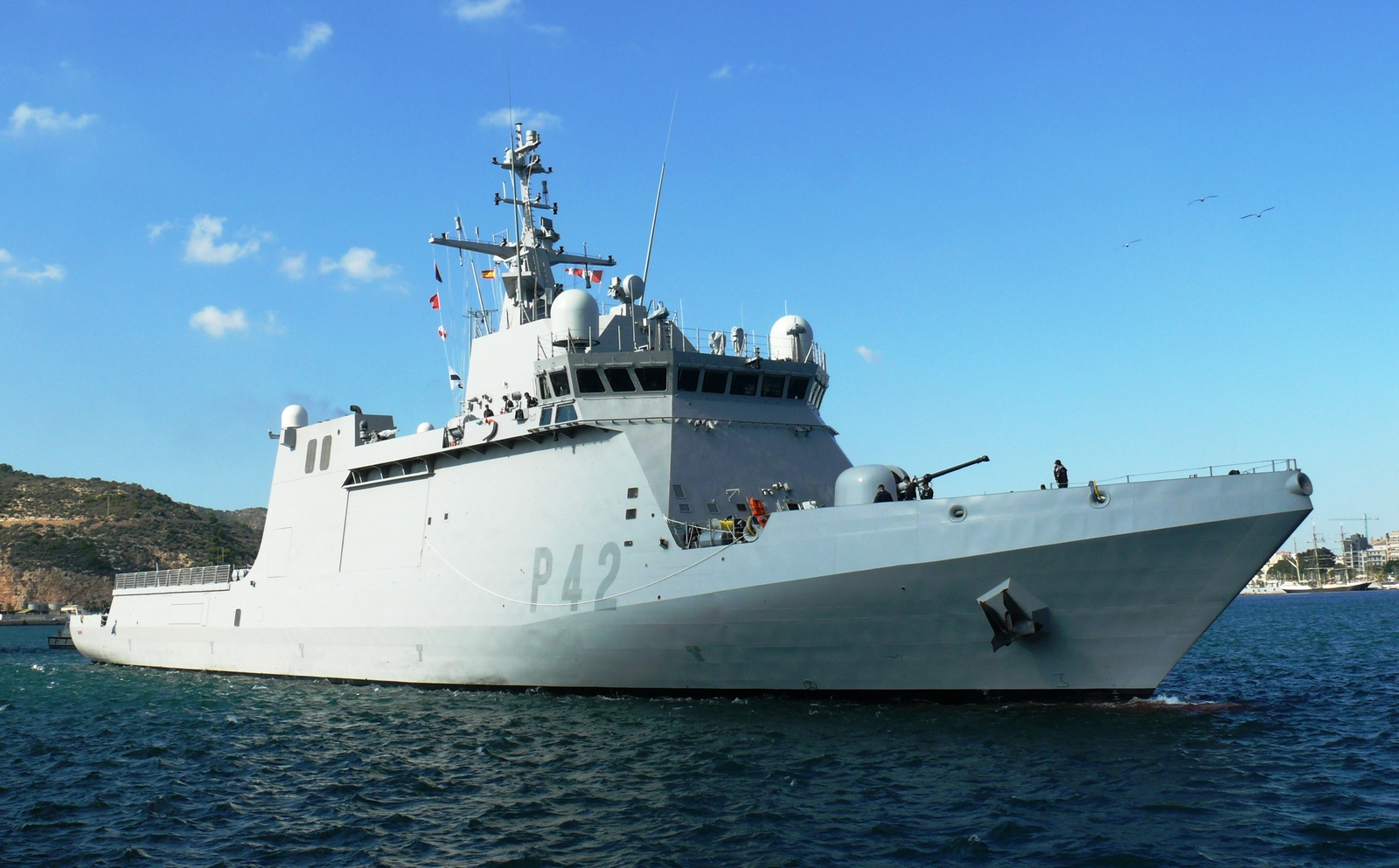
- Rayo

Class overview
- Builders: Navantia
- Operators: Spanish Navy
- Cost: €183 million (2020) (equivalent to €204.49 million in 2022) per unit
- Planned: 12
- Completed: 6
- Active: 6

General characteristics
- Type: Offshore patrol vessel
- Displacement: 2,860 t (full load)
- Length: 93.9 m (308 ft 1 in)
- Beam: 14.2 m (46 ft 7 in)
- Draft: 4.2 m (13 ft 9 in)
- Propulsion: 2 diesel engines; 4 groups diesel generators; 2 electric motors propellers; 1 emergency generator; Located 2 cross bow thruster
- Speed: 20 knots (37 km/h; 23 mph)+
- Range: 3,500 nmi (6,500 km; 4,000 mi) at 15 knots (28 km/h; 17 mph)
- Complement: 46 crew and 30 forces
- Armament: 1 OTO Melara 76 mm; 2 × 25 mm automatic mountings Mk 38 MOD 2A; 2 × 12.7 mm machine guns M2 Browning; 4 × Mark 36 SRBOC
- Aircraft carried: 1 × Agusta-Bell 212 helicopter

The Meteoro-class offshore patrol vessel, also known as Buque de Acción Marítima (BAM; literally "Maritime Action Vessel"), are modular offshore patrol vessels of the Spanish Navy adapted to different purposes from a common base, manufactured by Navantia. The BAMs combine high performance with mission versatility, a high commonality with other ships operated by the Spanish Navy. Acquisition and lifecycle costs are reduced.

== Description ==
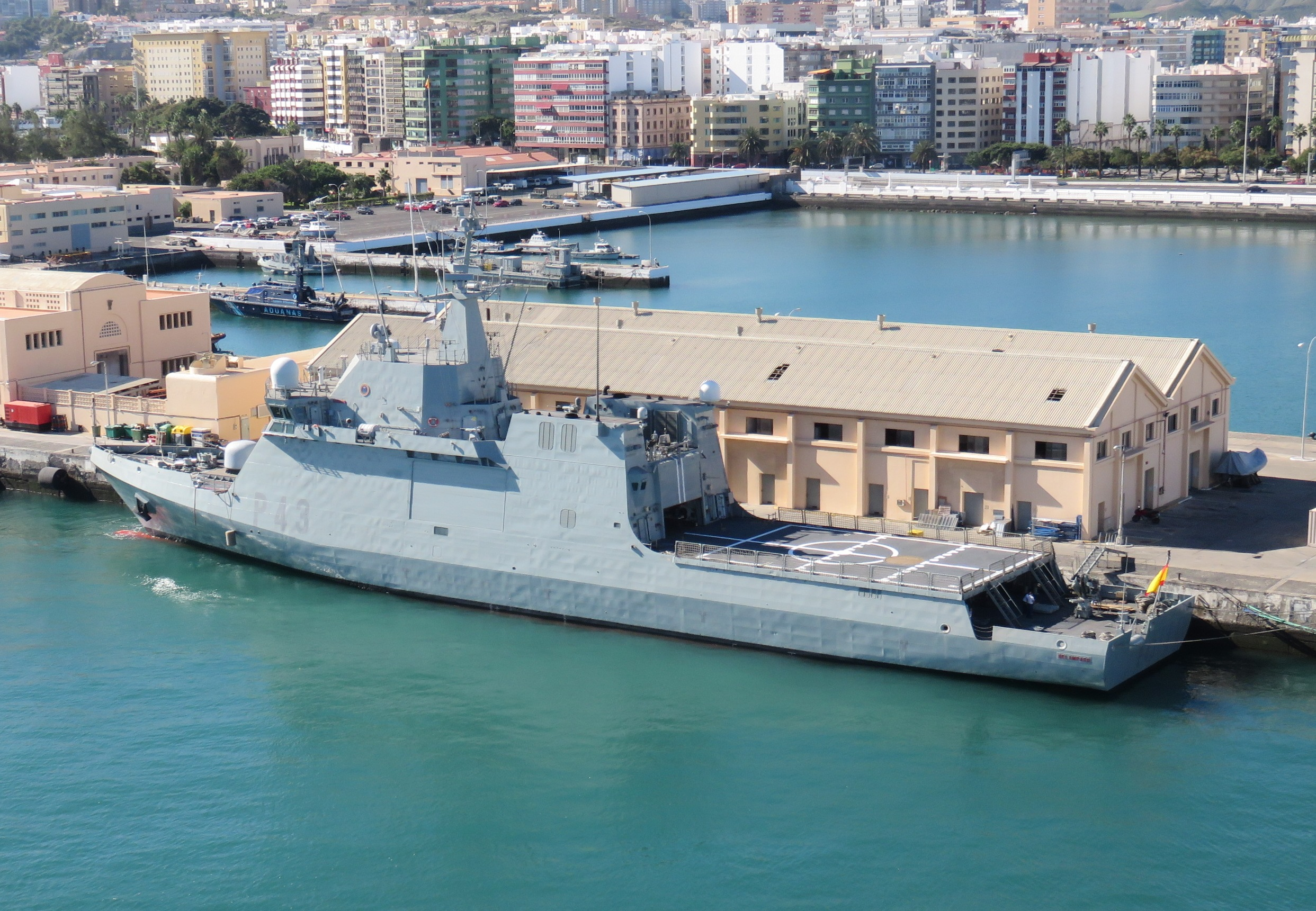
Aerial view of Relámpago

The BAMs are a common platform for a variety of missions, used to develop whole families of types of ships that meet the diverse needs of the Spanish Navy.

Their main missions are:

- Protection and escort of other ships in low intensity/asymmetric warfare situations
- Control of maritime traffic
- Control and neutralization of terrorism and piracy
- Operations against drug trafficking and human trafficking
- Search and rescue
- Support for crisis situations and humanitarian aid
- Control of fishing laws
- Control of environmental legislation and anti-pollution.

Modular design enables the ships to be modified for purposes outside main missions such as hydrographic research, intelligence gathering, diving support and salvage operations.

== Building ==
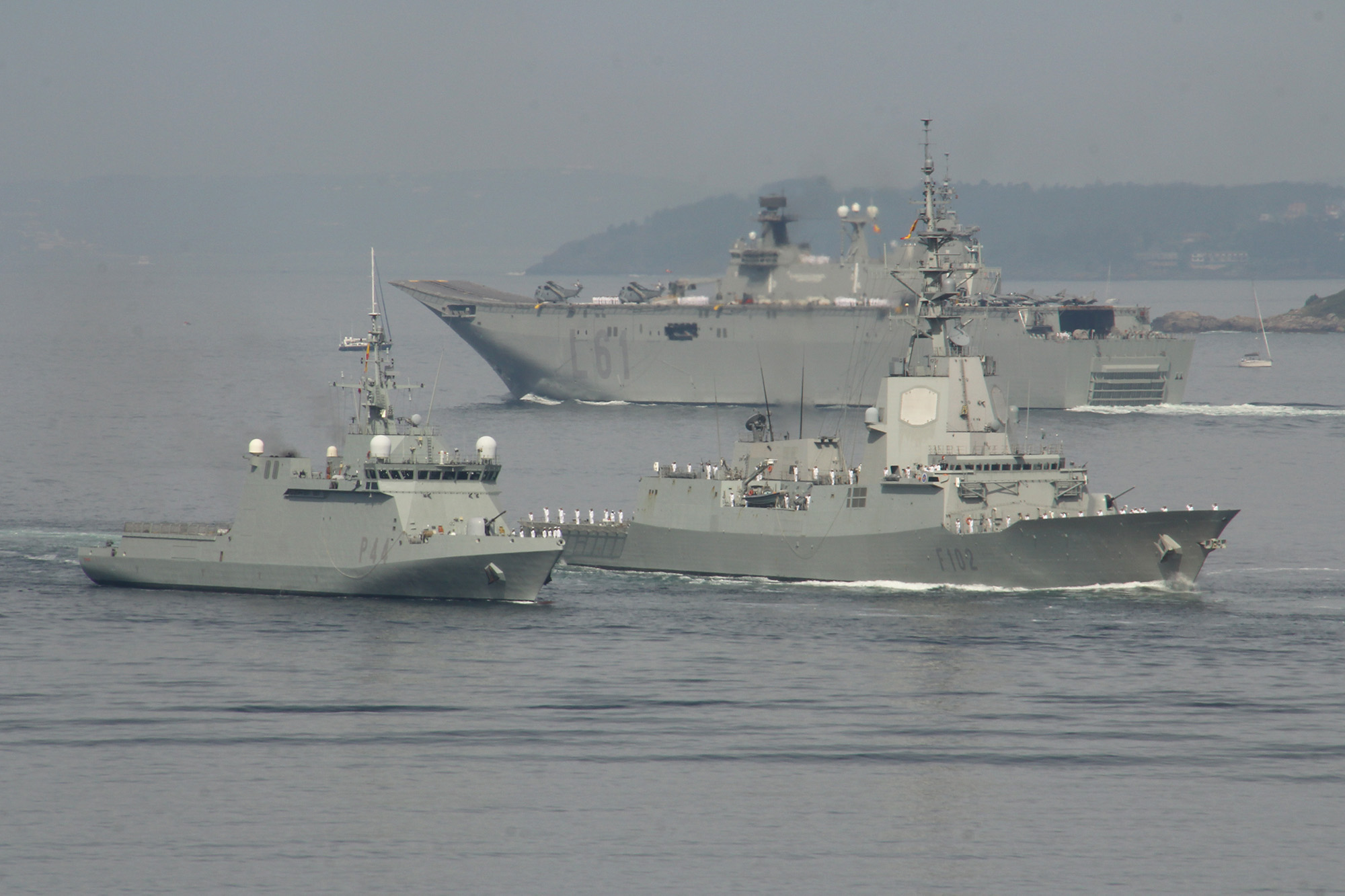
Naval parade of the Spanish Navy held in 2017. In the image, the BAM Tornado (foreground), the frigate Almirante Juan de Borbón (middle) and the flagship amphibious assault ship Juan Carlos I (background)

The BAM project consists of 12 vessels.

=== First phase ===
The first phase included the construction of six patrol boats. This phase was completed in January 2019 after twelve years.

=== Second phase ===
Like the first phase, this second is composed of six units. Four of the hulls are patrol boats and the two remaining are specialized BAMs, one oceanographic and the other underwater rescue.

==== Characteristics of the oceanographic BAM ====
- Flight cover for medium helicopter (Lynx) without hangar.
- Transportation personnel: 20 scientists.
- Scientific premises: Biological, humid with cava, electronic, geological, meteorological, photographic laboratories.
- Drawing room, data center, local electronic equipment, electronics workshop, diving room with hyperbaric chamber, probe local and transducer site.
- Local gravimetry, spare cloths, oceanography warehouse, water clothing store.
- Probe nacelle, transverse propellers in bow and stern.
- Davits and chigres: Popa porch for oceanography and towed sonar, lateral davit for rosettes, lateral davit for plankton extraction.
- Possibility of stowing scientific containers in Toldilla Deck.
- Side scanning variable depth sonar (Medium / High Frequency) and sonar/parametric probe.

==== Characteristics of the underwater rescue BAM ====
The vessel was authorized for construction at a projected cost of 166 million Euros in 2021; construction of the new vessel (named Poseidón) began in July 2023 and she is planned for delivery in 2026.

- Rescue and support to the rescue of submarines. The new rescue vessel is known as the BAM-IS (Buque de Acción Marítima - Intervención Subacuática / Maritime Action Vessel - Underwater Intervention).
- Support for diving operations.
- Intervention and rescue in accidents and shipwrecks.
- Surveillance and monitoring of the heritage (of growing interest in litigation with the company Odyssey over the frigate Nuestra Señora de las Mercedes between 2007 and 2012).
- Search and rescue operations.
- Transport of personnel and material.
- Fight against pollution.

=== Third phase ===
Two additional offshore patrol vessels (BAM III) were approved for acquisition in 2023 at a cost of 550 million Euros. They are planned for service entry in the mid to latter 2020s and will replace capacity that is being lost with the retirement of the last two Descubierta-class offshore patrol vessels, Infanta Elena and Infanta Cristina, in 2023.

== History ==
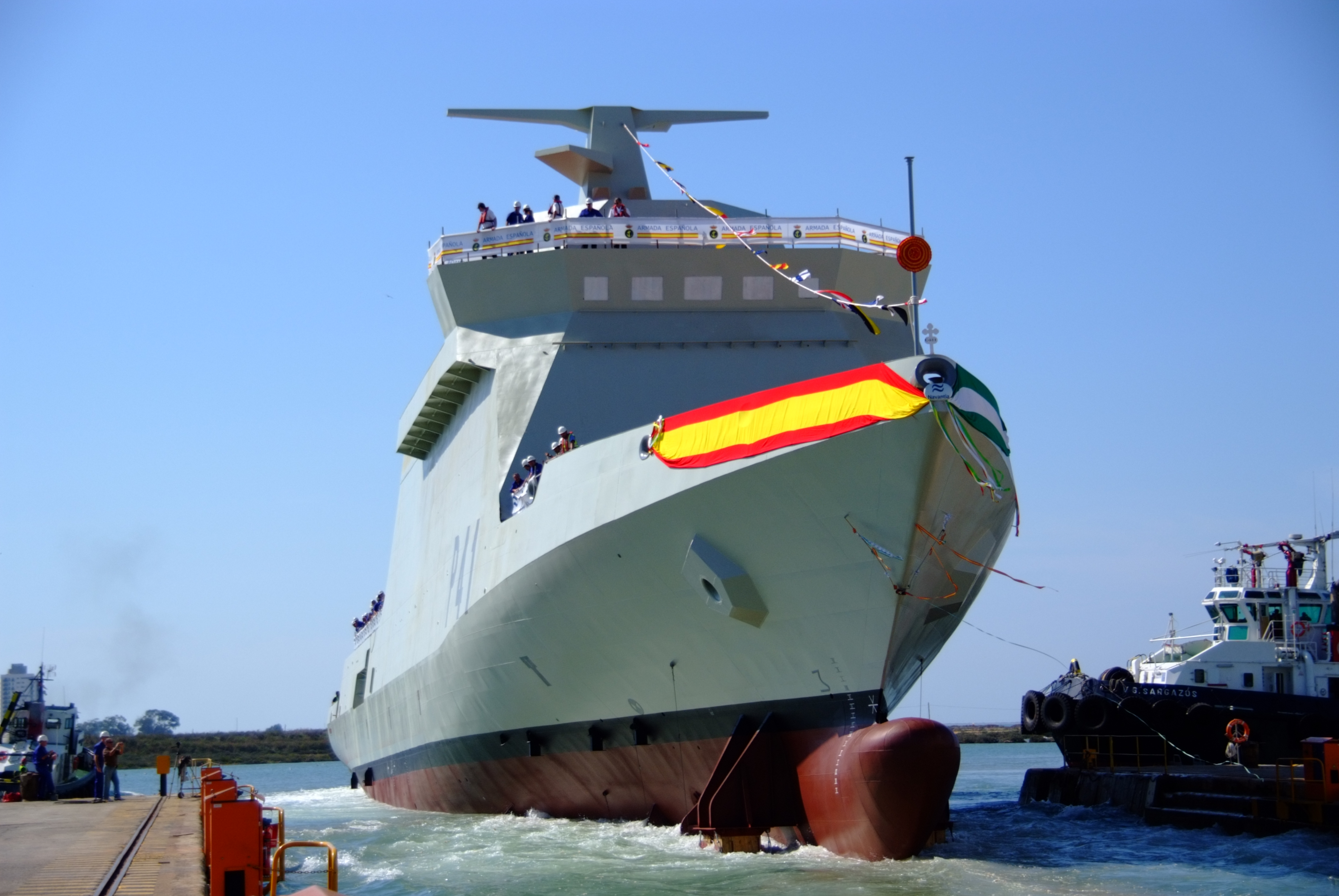
Launching of Meteoro

Construction began on 4 October 2007 with the cutting of the first sheet and was placed on the stands the first on 13 March 2009, in the shipyard San Fernando. The budget was €352m but the final cost was €488.4m for four units (~US$160m each).

In June 2009, the Secretary of State for Defence and Congress confirmed the construction of a second batch to replace older patrol boats of the Anaga (3), Toralla (2), Descubierta (4) and the now-retired Barceló (6) and Conejera (4) classes. In September 2010, the Ministry of Defence said a contract would be signed with Navantia for four additional vessels to be delivered by 2015, but the contract has yet to be signed. Navantia has indicated that the Batch 2 vessels will be more modular, with the potential to switch between oceanography, intelligence gathering and search-and-rescue. One will be a diving support vessel, and one will be a research vessel for hydrography and logistical support in the Antarctic. The acquisition of two vessels, to enter service in 2019, was formally approved by the Spanish cabinet on 18 July 2014 at a cost of €166.74m (US$224m) each. However, the envisaged in service date was subsequently delayed until the mid-2020s.

After the authorization by the Ministry of Finance in 2020 of the investment of 167 million euros,26 at the end of 2021 the Ministry of Defense signed the order to execute the project for the construction of a new BAM, in its underwater intervention version (BAM-IS). In April 2023 it was confirmed that it would receive the name Poseidón and the hull number A-21.

In June 2023, after the approval of the Treasury, the Council of Ministers began the procedures for the construction of two new BAMs for maritime patrol, with extensive anti-submarine warfare capabilities, for 550 million euros.

In September 2025, the Government authorized the design and construction of two more units.

== Ships ==
Pennant Number	Ship name	Builder	Laid down	Launched	Commissioned	Homeport	Status
P-41	Meteoro	Navantia, San Fernando	4 October 2007	16 October 2009	28 July 2012	Las Palmas Naval Base	Active
P-42	Rayo	Navantia, San Fernando	3 September 2009	18 May 2010	26 October 2011	Las Palmas Naval Base	Active
P-43	Relámpago	Navantia, San Fernando	17 December 2009	6 October 2010	6 February 2012	Las Palmas Naval Base	Active
P-44	Tornado	Navantia, San Fernando	5 May 2010	21 March 2011	19 July 2012	Las Palmas Naval Base	Active
P-45	Audaz	Navantia, San Fernando	29 April 2016	30 March 2017	27 July 2018	Cartagena Naval Base	Active
P-46	Furor	Navantia, Ferrol	29 April 2016	8 September 2017	21 January 2019	Cartagena Naval Base	Active
P-47	TBD						Ordered
P-48	TBD						Ordered
A-21	Poseidón		3 July 2023	18 September 2026	2026		Under construction
