= List of active Spanish Navy ships =

Naval ensign of Spanish Navy

This is a list of active Spanish Navy ships, complete and correct as of December 2016, partially updated to January 2024.

There are approximately 139 vessels in the Navy, including minor auxiliary vessels. A breakdown includes; one amphibious assault ship (also used as an aircraft carrier), two amphibious transport docks, 11 frigates, two submarines, six mine countermeasure vessels, 23 patrol vessels and a number of auxiliary ships. The total displacement of the Spanish Navy is approximately 225,000 tonnes.

== Submarine fleet ==
Class	In service	Origin	Image	Type	Builder	Boat	No.	Comm.	Dsp. (metric)	Homeport	Notes
Galerna class (S-70 class / Agosta 90B)	1	France (designer); Spain (built under licence)		Diesel-electric attack submarine	DCNS (designer); Bazán (Cartagena shipyard)	Galerna	S 71	21 Jan 1983	1,490 tonnes (surfaced); 1,750 tonnes (submerged)	Cartagena	Last remaining S-70 in service. Being replaced by the S-80 class.
Isaac Peral class (S-80 Plus class)	1	Spain		Diesel-electric attack submarine	Navantia (Cartagena shipyard)	Isaac Peral	S 81	30 Nov 2023	2,695 tonnes (surfaced); 2,965 tonnes (submerged)	Cartagena	

== Surface warship fleet ==
Class	In service	Origin	Image	Type	Builder	Ship	No.	Comm.	Dsp. (metric)	Homeport	Notes
Aircraft carrier (1)
Juan Carlos I	1	Spain		Aircraft carrier / amphibious assault ship	Navantia (Ferrol shipyard)	Juan Carlos I	L61	30 Sep 2010	26.000 tonnes	Rota (Amphibious Projection Group)	AV-8B Harrier II Plus fighter operated.
Amphibious warfare ships (2)
Galicia class	2	Spain; Netherlands (co-design)		Amphibious transport dock	Navantia (Ferrol shipyard) / Damen (co-designRotterdam Class)	Galicia	L51	30 Apr 1998	13,000 tonnes	Rota (Amphibious Projection Group)	
Galicia class	2	Spain; Netherlands (co-design)		Amphibious transport dock	Navantia (Ferrol shipyard) / Damen (co-designRotterdam Class)	Castilla	L52	26 Jun 2000	13,000 tonnes	Rota (Amphibious Projection Group)	
Major surface combatants (11)
Álvaro de Bazán class (F-100 class)	5	Spain		Air defence frigate	Navantia (Ferrol shipyard)	Álvaro de Bazán	F101	Sep 2002	5,800 tonnes	Ferrol (31st Escort Squadron)	Based on the Aegis air defence combat system. Radar modernisation (since 2024).
Álvaro de Bazán class (F-100 class)	5	Spain		Air defence frigate	Navantia (Ferrol shipyard)	Almirante Juan de Borbón	F102	3 Dec 2003	5,800 tonnes	Ferrol (31st Escort Squadron)	Based on the Aegis air defence combat system. Radar modernisation (since 2024).
Álvaro de Bazán class (F-100 class)	5	Spain		Air defence frigate	Navantia (Ferrol shipyard)	Blas de Lezo	F103	16 Dec 2004	5,800 tonnes	Ferrol (31st Escort Squadron)	Based on the Aegis air defence combat system. Radar modernisation (since 2024).
Álvaro de Bazán class (F-100 class)	5	Spain		Air defence frigate	Navantia (Ferrol shipyard)	Méndez Núñez	F104	21 Mar 2006	5,800 tonnes	Ferrol (31st Escort Squadron)	Based on the Aegis air defence combat system. Radar modernisation (since 2024).
Álvaro de Bazán class (F-100 class)	5	Spain		Air defence frigate	Navantia (Ferrol shipyard)	Cristóbal Colón	F105	23 Oct 2012	6,391 tonnes	Ferrol (31st Escort Squadron)	Based on the Aegis air defence combat system. Radar modernisation (since 2024).
Santa María class (F-80 class)	6	United States (designer); Spain (built under licence)		Guided missile frigates (ASW, ASuW, anti-air)	Bath Iron Works (designer) / Bazán (Ferrol shipyard)	Santa María	F81	12 Oct 1986	3,900 tonnes	Rota (41st Escort Squadron)	Derived from Oliver Hazard Perry class, manufactured locally. Planned to be replaced by the Bonifaz class (F110 class) from 2028 to 2032.
Santa María class (F-80 class)	6	United States (designer); Spain (built under licence)		Guided missile frigates (ASW, ASuW, anti-air)	Bath Iron Works (designer) / Bazán (Ferrol shipyard)	Victoria	F82	11 Nov 1987	3,900 tonnes	Rota (41st Escort Squadron)	Derived from Oliver Hazard Perry class, manufactured locally. Planned to be replaced by the Bonifaz class (F110 class) from 2028 to 2032.
Santa María class (F-80 class)	6	United States (designer); Spain (built under licence)		Guided missile frigates (ASW, ASuW, anti-air)	Bath Iron Works (designer) / Bazán (Ferrol shipyard)	Numancia	F83	8 Nov 1988	3,900 tonnes	Rota (41st Escort Squadron)	Derived from Oliver Hazard Perry class, manufactured locally. Planned to be replaced by the Bonifaz class (F110 class) from 2028 to 2032.
Santa María class (F-80 class)	6	United States (designer); Spain (built under licence)		Guided missile frigates (ASW, ASuW, anti-air)	Bath Iron Works (designer) / Bazán (Ferrol shipyard)	Reina Sofía	F84	18 Oct 1990	3,900 tonnes	Rota (41st Escort Squadron)	Derived from Oliver Hazard Perry class, manufactured locally. Planned to be replaced by the Bonifaz class (F110 class) from 2028 to 2032.
Santa María class (F-80 class)	6	United States (designer); Spain (built under licence)		Guided missile frigates (ASW, ASuW, anti-air)	Bath Iron Works (designer) / Bazán (Ferrol shipyard)	Navarra	F85	30 May 1994	3,900 tonnes	Rota (41st Escort Squadron)	Derived from Oliver Hazard Perry class, manufactured locally. Planned to be replaced by the Bonifaz class (F110 class) from 2028 to 2032.
Santa María class (F-80 class)	6	United States (designer); Spain (built under licence)		Guided missile frigates (ASW, ASuW, anti-air)	Bath Iron Works (designer) / Bazán (Ferrol shipyard)	Canarias	F86	14 Dec 1994	3,900 tonnes	Rota (41st Escort Squadron)	Derived from Oliver Hazard Perry class, manufactured locally. Planned to be replaced by the Bonifaz class (F110 class) from 2028 to 2032.
Oceanic patrol vessels (6)
Meteoro class BAM	6	Spain		Offshore patrol vessel	Navantia (San Fernando shipyard / Puerto Real shypyard)	Meteoro	P41	28 Jul 2012	2,500 tonnes	Las Palmas	Additional ships on order.
Meteoro class BAM	6	Spain		Offshore patrol vessel	Navantia (San Fernando shipyard / Puerto Real shypyard)	Rayo	P42	26 Oct 2011	2,670 tonnes	Las Palmas	Additional ships on order.
Meteoro class BAM	6	Spain		Offshore patrol vessel	Navantia (San Fernando shipyard / Puerto Real shypyard)	Relámpago	P43	6 Feb 2012	2,670 tonnes	Las Palmas	Additional ships on order.
Meteoro class BAM	6	Spain		Offshore patrol vessel	Navantia (San Fernando shipyard / Puerto Real shypyard)	Tornado	P44	19 Jul 2012	2,621 tonnes	Las Palmas	Additional ships on order.
Meteoro class BAM	6	Spain		Offshore patrol vessel	Navantia (San Fernando shipyard / Puerto Real shypyard)	Audaz	P45	27 Jul 2018	2,840 tonnes	Cartagena	Additional ships on order.
Meteoro class BAM	6	Spain		Offshore patrol vessel	Navantia (San Fernando shipyard / Puerto Real shypyard)	Furor	P46	21 Jan 2019	2,840 tonnes	Cartagena	Additional ships on order.
Patrol vessels (16)
Chilreu class	3	Spain		Patrol boat	Freire Shipyard	Alborán	P62	1 Aug 1997	1,962 tonnes	Cartagena	
Chilreu class	3	Spain		Patrol boat	Freire Shipyard	Arnomendi	P63	13 Dec 2000	1,928 tonnes	Cartagena	
Chilreu class	3	Spain		Patrol boat	Freire Shipyard	Tarifa	P64	22 Jun 2004	1,976 tonnes	Cartagena	
Serviola class	4	Spain		Patrol boat	Bazán (Ferrol shipyard)	Serviola	P71	22 Mar 1991	1,200 tonnes	Ferrol	
Serviola class	4	Spain		Patrol boat	Bazán (Ferrol shipyard)	Centinela	P72	24 Sep 1991	1,200 tonnes	Ferrol	
Serviola class	4	Spain		Patrol boat	Bazán (Ferrol shipyard)	Vigía	P73	24 Mar 1992	1,200 tonnes	Cádiz	
Serviola class	4	Spain		Patrol boat	Bazán (Ferrol shipyard)	Atalaya	P74	29 Jun 1992	1,200 tonnes	Ferrol	
Anaga class	3	Spain		Patrol boat	Bazán (San Fernando shipyard)	Tagomago	P22	30 Jan 1981	319 tonnes	Malaga	The P28 is used both for operations and training.
Anaga class	3	Spain		Patrol boat	Bazán (San Fernando shipyard)	Medas	P26	16 Oct 1981	319 tonnes	Cádiz	The P28 is used both for operations and training.
Anaga class	3	Spain		Patrol boat	Bazán (San Fernando shipyard)	Tabarca	P28	30 Dec 1981	319 tonnes	Ferrol	The P28 is used both for operations and training.
Toralla class	1			Patrol boat	Viudes Shipyards	Formentor	P82	29 Apr 1987	133 tonnes	Cartagena	The Toralla sister-ship was retired in 2026.
Rodman-101 class	1			Patrol boat	Rodman Polyships	Isla de León	P83	2 Jan 2023 (with Spanish Navy) / 2003 (Ministry of Agriculture)	62 tonnes	Ceuta	Boat acquired from the Galician Coast Guard.
Rodman-66 class	1	Spain		Patrol boat	Rodman Polyships	Isla Pinto	P84	21 Jun 2023	44 tonnes	Melilla	
River patrol boat (2)
Cabo Fradera class	1	Spain		River patrol boat	Bazán (San Fernando shipyard)	Cabo Fradera	P201	11 Jan 1963	28 tonnes	Tui	
Aresa PVC-160 class	1	Spain		Patrol boat	Drassanes d'Arenys	–	P114	1979	20,8 tonnes	Ayamonte	
Mine countermeasure ships (6)
Segura class	6	Spain		Minehunter	Bazán (Cartagena shipyard)	Segura	M31	27 Mar 1999	583 tonnes	Cartagena (41st Escort Squadron)	
Segura class	6	Spain		Minehunter	Bazán (Cartagena shipyard)	Sella	M32	28 May 1999	570 tonnes	Cartagena (41st Escort Squadron)	
Segura class	6	Spain		Minehunter	Bazán (Cartagena shipyard)	Tambre	M33	18 Feb 2000	570 tonnes	Cartagena (41st Escort Squadron)	
Segura class	6	Spain		Minehunter	Bazán (Cartagena shipyard)	Turia	M34	20 May 2000	583 tonnes	Cartagena (41st Escort Squadron)	
Segura class	6	Spain		Minehunter	Bazán (Cartagena shipyard)	Duero	M35	7 May 2004	583 tonnes	Cartagena (41st Escort Squadron)	
Segura class	6	Spain		Minehunter	Bazán (Cartagena shipyard)	Tajo	M36	1 Oct 2005	583 tonnes	Cartagena (41st Escort Squadron)	

=== Auxiliary fleet ===
Class	In service	Origin	Image	Type	Builder	Ship	No.	Comm.	Dsp. (metric)	Homeport	Notes
Refuelling ships (2)
Patiño class	1	Spain; Netherlands (co-design)		Replenishment oiler	Bazán (Ferrol shipyard) / Damen (co-design HNLMS Amsterdam)	Patiño	A14	16 Jun 1995	17,050 tonnes	Rota (Amphibious Projection Group)	
–	1	Spain		Replenishment oiler	Navantia (Cádiz shipyard)	Cantabria	A15	29 Sep 2010	19,550 tonnes	Rota (Amphibious Projection Group)	a a
Logistic support (2)
Suardiaz Galicia class	1	Spain		Logistics support ship / RoRo	Hijos de J. Barreras shipyard	Ysabel	A06	(2003); 2 Jun 2021	16,300 tonnes	Cartagena	Former civilian ship Suardiaz Galicia.
Electronic warfare ships (1)
Darss class	1	East Germany		Intelligence gathering ship (ELINT / SIGINT)	Neptunwerft	Alerta	A111	(10 May 1985); 21 Dec 1992	2,292 tonnes	Cartagena	Ex Jasmund transport ship of East Germany.
Rescue ships (1)
Amatista Mod class	1	Spain		Submarine rescue ship	Duro Felguera Gijon shipyard	Neptuno	A20	(24 Mar 1975); 14 Dec 1988	1,860 tonnes	Cartagena	To be replaced by the new BAM-IS in 2026.
Multipurpose vessel (3)
Havyard HY820 class	2	Spain		Multipurpose vessel	Zamakona Yard	(Ocean Osprey); Carnota	A61	( – ) 29 Nov 2023	2,284 tonnes	Ferrol	Bought second-hand.
Havyard HY820 class	2	Spain		Multipurpose vessel	Zamakona Yard	(Ocean Marlin); TBA	–	(Sep 2014); 21 Oct 2026	2,284 tonnes	–	Bought second-hand.
SALT 450 SSV class	1	Norway (design); Turkey (construction)		Multipurpose vessel	Salt Ship Design / Cemre Shipyard	(Ocean Fortune); Cartagena	A62	( – ) 20 Nov 2024	3,086 tonnes	Cartagena	Bought second-hand. a a
Tugboats (2)
Amatista class	1	Spain		Salvage tug	Duro Felguera Gijon shipyard	Mar Caribe	A101	(1984); 1988	1,860 tonnes	Cádiz	
Punta Amer class	1	Spain		Ocean-going Tugboat	Astilleros Luzuriaga S.A.	La Graña	A53	1983	670 tonnes	Cádiz	
Polar research (1)
–	1	Spain		Polar research ship	Bazán (Cartagena shipyard)	BIO Hespérides	A33	16 May 1991	2,850 tonnes	Cartagena	
Hydrographic survey vessels (5)
Malaspina class	2	Spain		Hydrographic survey ships	Bazán (Cádiz shipyard)	Malaspina	A31	21 Feb 1975	1,200 tonnes	Cádiz	
Malaspina class	2	Spain		Hydrographic survey ships	Bazán (Cádiz shipyard)	Tofiño	A32	23 Apr 1975	1,200 tonnes	Cádiz	
Astrolabio class (Rodman-1250 class)	2	Spain		Hydrographic survey boats	Rodman Polyships	Astrolabio	A91	2001	13 tonnes	Cádiz	
Astrolabio class (Rodman-1250 class)	2	Spain		Hydrographic survey boats	Rodman Polyships	Escandallo	A92	2004	13 tonnes	Cádiz	
–	1	Spain		Hydrographic survey boats	Rodman Polyships	Sondaleza	A93	Feb 2014	12 tonnes	Cádiz	
Training vessels (2)
–	1	Spain		Training vessel	Armon Vigo Shipyards	Intermares	A41	(2009); 2018 a	3,200 tonnes	Ferrol	
–	1	Spain		Sail training vessel	Echevarrieta y Larrinaga shipyard	Juan Sebastián Elcano	A71	Aug 1928	3,770 tonnes	San Fernando	

=== Other ships ===
- Approximately 90 patrol boats of the Maritime Component of the Servicio de Vigilancia Aduanera are technically classified as Spanish Navy Auxiliary vessels.
- Small training vessels
  - Sail training ships
    - A72 Arosa (1981) (ex-Algoma 1931)
    - A73 Blanca (2013)
    - A74 La Graciosa (1988) (ex-Dejá vu)
    - A76 Giralda (1993) (ex-Juan de Borbon's yacht), 1958)
    - A77 Almansa (2013)
    - A78 Peregrina (2007)
    - A79 Aguete (2014)
    - A80 Nautilus (2015)
    - A81 Asturias (2017)
    - A82 Tambo (2023)
    - A83 Regulus I (2024)
    - A84 Regulus II (2024)
    - A85 Regulus III (2024)
    - A86 Regulus IV (2024)
  - Training launches
    - A121 Guardiamarina Barrutia (2006)
    - A122 Guardiamarina Chereguini (2006)
    - A123 Guardiamarina Rull (2007)
    - A124 Guardiamarina Salas (2007)
    - A125 Maestre de Marinería Bustelo Pavón (2020)
    - A126 Maestre de Marinería Pérez Verdú (2020)
    - A127 Guardiamarina Godínez (2023)
    - A128 Guardiamarina Herrero (2023)

== See also ==
- Servicio de Vigilancia Aduanera – For details on another maritime organisation of Spain
- List of future Spanish Navy ships - For information on Spanish Navy capability acquisition programs
- List of historic Spanish Navy ships - For information on ships already retired from the Spanish Navy
