= Spanish patrol boat Atalaya =

Spanish patrol boat

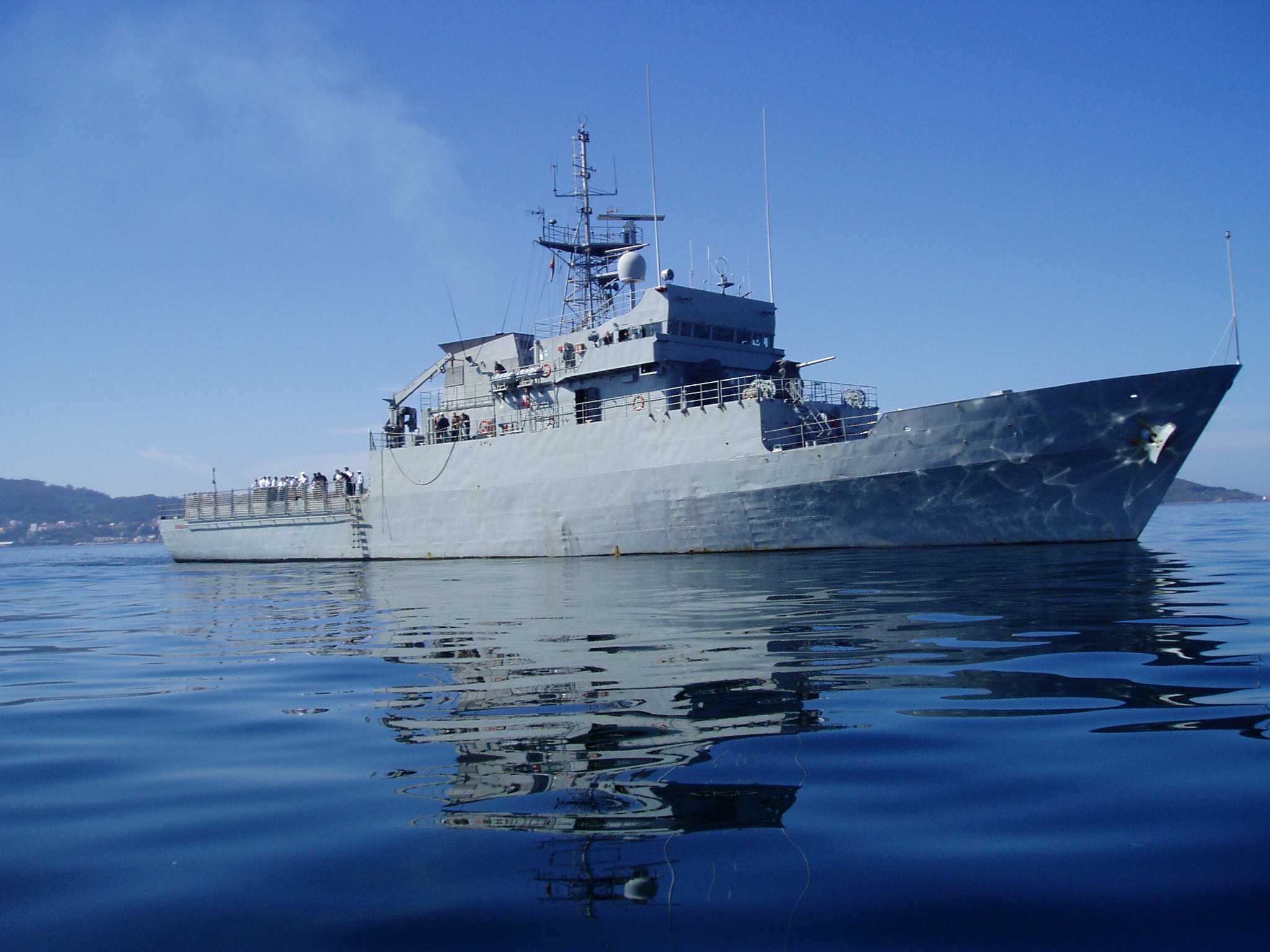

History

Spain
- Name: Atalaya
- Builder: Navantia
- Launched: 1992
- Commissioned: 29 June 1992
- Home port: Ferrol
- Identification: MMSI number: 224803000

General characteristics
- Class & type: Serviola-class patrol boat
- Displacement: 1,106 tons
- Length: 68 m (223 ft 1 in)
- Beam: 10 m (32 ft 10 in)
- Draught: 3 m (9 ft 10 in)
- Installed power: 7,500 hp (5,600 kW)
- Propulsion: 2 variable-pitch propellers
- Speed: 20 knots (37 km/h; 23 mph) max
- Crew: 48
- Armament: 1 x 76mm/50 Mk.22 gun.; 2 × 12.7 mm Browning machine guns

Atalaya (P-74) is a Serviola-class patrol boat of the Spanish Navy built in 1991. The ship's primary missions are oceanic patrol, fishing control, escort, and maritime rescue. Its home port is at the La Graña Naval Station in Ferrol.

== Description ==
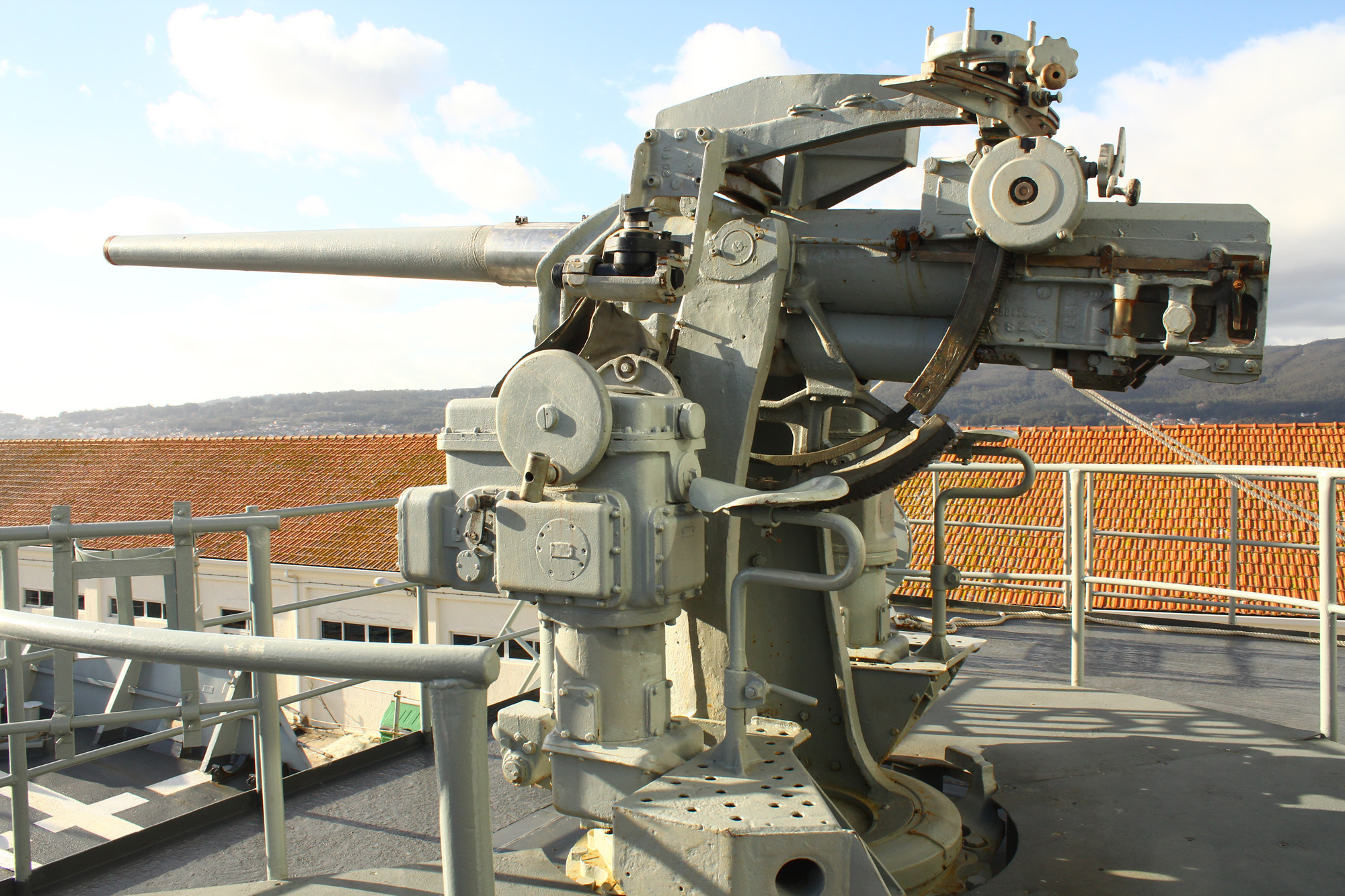
The primary 3-inch gun of Atalaya

Atalaya is an offshore patrol vessel with a displacement of 1,200 tons. It is 68 m (223 ft 1 in) long, has a beam of 10 m (32 ft 10 in), and a draught of 3 m (9 ft 10 in). It is powered by two MTU engines which supply 7,500 horsepower (5,600 kW) to two variable-pitch propellers for a maximum speed of 20 knots. It is equipped with a single 3-inch (76 mm) gun and two 12.7 mm Browning machine guns, and has a crew of 48. Its flight deck can receive medium helicopters.

== History ==
The ship was built by Navantia in the company's shipyards at Ferrol, and was commissioned by the Spanish Navy on 29 June 1992.

In April 1995, Atalaya was sent to the Northeast Atlantic during the bloodless Turbot War with Canada. It relieved its sister ship Centinela, and remained in the area until it was relieved by the returning Vigía on 6 May 1995. It returned to the area from 13 to 31 June. Atalaya provided maritime security for the 33rd Copa América from 8–10 February 2010.

The ship was involved in an incident on 3 May 2011 off the coast of Gibraltar, when it signaled a merchant ship at anchor to leave Spanish waters. However, Gibraltar maritime authorities instructed the merchant ship to remain at anchor and told Atalaya that Spain did not have jurisdiction over those waters. The British patrol boat HMS Scimitar was dispatched to the area and escorted Atalaya away.

In August 2015, Atalaya intercepted and boarded a sailboat off the Azores Islands and confiscated 600 kg (1,300 lb) of cocaine that was in transit from South America to Galicia.
