= Crinophtheiros comatulicola =

Scientific classification
- Kingdom: Animalia
- Phylum: Mollusca
- Class: Gastropoda
- Subclass: Caenogastropoda
- Order: Littorinimorpha
- Family: Eulimidae
- Genus: Crinophtheiros
- Species: C. comatulicola

Binomial name
- Crinophtheiros comatulicola Graff, 1875

Synonyms
- Crinophtheiros beryllina Monterosato, 1878; Eulima beryllina Monterosato, 1878; Stylina comatulicola Graff, 1875

Species of gastropod

Crinophtheiros comatulicola is a species of sea snail, a marine gastropod mollusk in the family Eulimidae.

== Distribution ==
This species occurs in the following locations:

- European waters (ERMS scope)
- Greek Exclusive Economic Zone
- Portuguese Exclusive Economic Zone
- Spanish Exclusive Economic Zone
- Adriatic Sea
- Mediterranean Sea

== Overview ==
The species Crinophtheiros comatulicola lives in the Mediterranean Sea, particularly in the Adriatic, the Spanish Exclusive Economic Zone, the Portuguese Exclusive Economic Zone, the Greek Exclusive Economic Zone, and European waters (ERMS scope). They are also ectoparasites of the crinoid Antedon mediterranea.
