= Crinophtheiros giustii =

Scientific classification
- Kingdom: Animalia
- Phylum: Mollusca
- Class: Gastropoda
- Subclass: Caenogastropoda
- Order: Littorinimorpha
- Family: Eulimidae
- Genus: Crinophtheiros
- Species: C. giustii

Binomial name
- Crinophtheiros giustii Gaglini, 1991

Species of gastropod

Crinophtheiros giustii is a species of sea snail, a marine gastropod mollusk in the family Eulimidae.

== Distribution ==
This species occurs in the following locations:

- European waters (ERMS scope)
