= Spanish patrol boat Alborán =

Patrol boat of the Spanish Navy

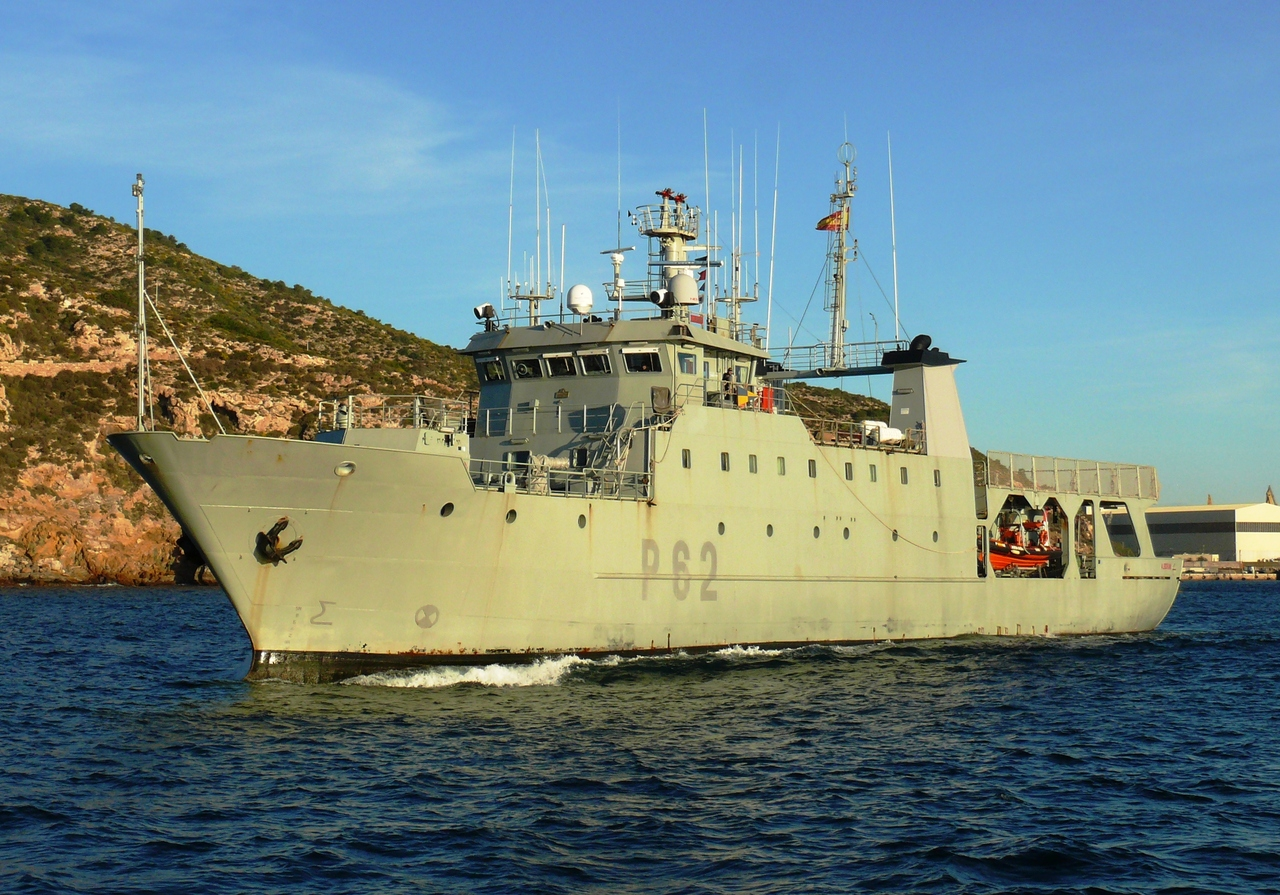

History

Spain
- Name: Alborán
- Namesake: Alboran Island
- Launched: 20 February 1993
- Commissioned: 1 August 1997
- Identification: MMSI number: 224640000; Call sign: EBBS; Hull number: P-62
- Status: In service

General characteristics
- Class & type: Chilreu-class patrol boat
- Displacement: 1,800 t (1,800 long tons)
- Length: 65.9 m (216 ft 2 in)
- Beam: 10.5 m (34 ft 5 in)
- Draught: 4.4 m (14 ft 5 in)
- Propulsion: 3,000 hp (2,200 kW) diesel engine
- Speed: 14 knots (26 km/h; 16 mph) max
- Electronic warfare & decoys: Furuno FAR-2825; Furuno FR-2130S
- Armament: 2 × Browning M2 12.7 mm (0.50 in) machine guns
- Aircraft carried: 1 × helicopter
- Aviation facilities: Flight deck

Alborán (P-62) is a Chilreu-class patrol boat of the Spanish Navy built in 1993. Named for Alboran Island, it is the first ship in the Spanish Navy to bear the name. Its primary mission is enforcing fishery regulations for the Spanish fishing fleet. The ship has a home port at the Cartagena Naval Base and is in the Maritime Action Force.

== Description ==
Alborán has a wooden hull sheathed in fiberglass, and its superstructure is made of aluminum. It has a displacement of 1,800 metric tons (1,800 long tons), a length of 66 meters (216 ft 6 in), and a beam of 10.5 meters (34 ft 5 in). It has a single variable-pitch propeller and 260-kilowatt (350 hp) bow thrusters, which are all supplied by a 2,200 kW (3,000 hp) MaK diesel engine powering a plant of two primary generators (313 kW each) and an emergency generator (95 kW).

The ship is armed with two Browning M2 12.7-millimeter (0.50 in) and two MG 42 7.62 mm (0.30 in) machine guns. Its crew is 37, with space to embark an additional 16. Alborán is equipped with SX-band surface and navigation radar, an ECDIS-integrated radar, and a FLIR thermal imaging camera. The ship has a flight deck for an AB-212 or H-500 light helicopter, and it can deploy two rigid hull inflatable boats.

== Mission ==
The primary mission of Alborán is to monitor and enforce maritime fishing. It helps to support the Ministry of Agriculture's presence in Spanish fishing grounds, and ensures compliance with national and international fishing regulations. Additionally, it is capable of performing search and rescue, acting as a platform for special operations, supporting scientific research, and transporting a contingent of 16 Marine Infantry troops.

== History ==
Construction began on Alborán in 1995. It was built by Freire Shipyard in Vigo and was completed in 1996. The vessel was delivered to the Navy on 8 January 1997.

In 2012, the ship was assigned to the European Union to carry out fishery inspections and surveillance in the Northwest Atlantic Fisheries Organization (NAFO) for a period of a month and a half. In May and June 2021, Alborán was attached to the European Fisheries Control Agency on a patrol to control swordfish and bluefin tuna fishing in Spain's Exclusive Economic Zone in the western Mediterranean. Later that year, the vessel embarked on a 20-day patrol with a similar mission, though extending to the eastern Mediterranean as well. As of 2023, it had completed a total of ten campaigns in the international waters regulated by NAFO and six in those of the North East Atlantic Fisheries Commission. Alborán participated in the Barcelona International Boat Show in October 2019 along with the frigate Santa María.
