= Crinophtheiros collinsi =

Scientific classification
- Kingdom: Animalia
- Phylum: Mollusca
- Class: Gastropoda
- Subclass: Caenogastropoda
- Order: Littorinimorpha
- Family: Eulimidae
- Genus: Crinophtheiros
- Species: C. collinsi

Binomial name
- Crinophtheiros collinsi Sykes, 1903

Synonyms
- Eulima collinsi Sykes, 1903

Species of gastropod

Crinophtheiros collinsi is a species of sea snail, a marine gastropod mollusk in the family Eulimidae.

== Distribution ==
This species occurs in the following locations:

- Azores Exclusive Economic Zone
- United Kingdom Exclusive Economic Zone
