= Crinophtheiros =

Scientific classification
- Kingdom: Animalia
- Phylum: Mollusca
- Class: Gastropoda
- Subclass: Caenogastropoda
- Order: Littorinimorpha
- Family: Eulimidae
- Genus: Crinophtheiros; Bouchet & Warén, 1986

Type species
- Stylina comatulicola Graff, 1875

Genus of gastropods

Crinophtheiros is a genus of sea snails, marine gastropod mollusks in the family Eulimidae.

== Species ==
The species within this genus include the following:

- Crinophtheiros collinsi (Sykes, 1903)
- Crinophtheiros comatulicola (Graff, 1875)
- Crinophtheiros giustii (Gaglini, 1991)
- Crinophtheiros junii (de Folin, 1887)
