= Spanish patrol boat Serviola =

Patrol boat in the Spanish Navy

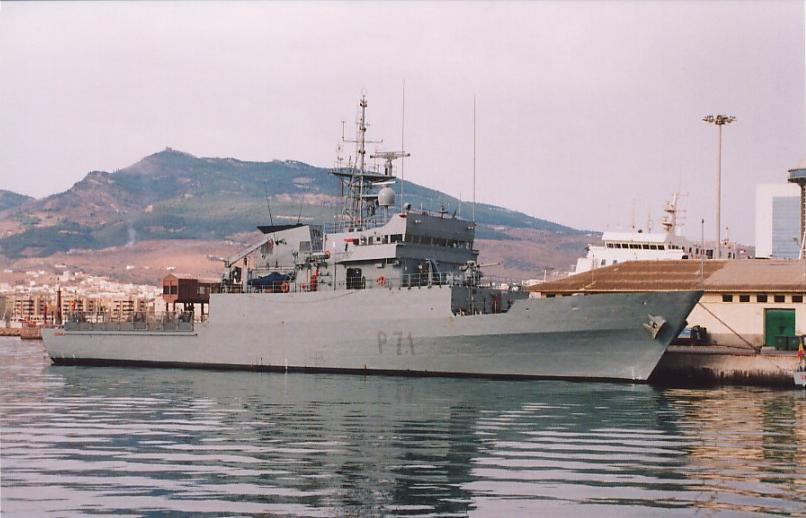

History

Spain
- Name: Serviola
- Namesake: Spanish word for the cathead, a heavy piece of timber for holding an anchor in position
- Builder: NAVANTIA
- Launched: 10 May 1990
- Commissioned: 22 March 1991
- Identification: MMSI number: 224942000; Call Sign: EBBN

General characteristics
- Class & type: Serviola-class patrol boat
- Length: 67 m (219 ft 10 in)
- Beam: 10 m (32 ft 10 in)
- Draught: 3 m (9 ft 10 in)
- Speed: 15.3 knots (28.3 km/h; 17.6 mph) max

Serviola (P-71) is the lead ship of the Serviola-class patrol boats of the Spanish Navy built in 1990. The ship has been involved in numerous anti-piracy and drug interdiction missions off the coast of Spain and in the Gulf of Guinea.

== Description ==
Serviola measures 67 meters (219 ft 10 in) long, 10 meters (32 ft 10 in) wide, and has a draft of 3 meters (9 ft 10 in). It has an average speed of 8.1 knots (15.0 km/h; 9.3 mph) and a maximum speed of 15.3 knots (28.3 km/h; 17.6 mph). In December 2021, the Spanish Navy announced that 12.7 mm "Guardian 30" naval weapons station would be installed aboard Serviola and several other patrol boats and frigates by the domestic company Escribano.

== History ==
In April 2019, Serviola detected the hijacking of a Nigerian merchant vessel by pirates. Upon Serviola's approach the pirates fled, having stolen small valuables from the crew. In May, Serviola was dispatched by Spanish authorities alongside a frigate from Equatorial Guinea to conduct an anti-piracy operation aboard the hijacked heavy-lift ship Blue Marlin. Blue Marlin had been boarded by seven pirates using a zodiac boat on 5 May after unloading its cargo in the territorial waters of Equatorial Guinea. Serviola approached Blue Marlin and seven embarked Spanish Marines boarded the vessel. They found that the pirates had left the crew unharmed, but had severely damaged the pilothouse before leaving. Serviola left the vicinity after it was arranged for a tug to assist Blue Marlin into safe harbor. Serviola continued to operate in the Gulf of Guinea as an anti-piracy ship through the rest of 2019 and into 2020.

In February 2021, Serviola was part of a drug interdiction mission in the Bay of Biscay. She intercepted the small bunkering tanker Nehir which was smuggling drugs off the Galician coast, sending a team from the National Police to board the ship. However, the smugglers had begun to scuttle their ship in order to prevent evidence of the drugs they were ferrying from falling into the hands of authorities. The National Police rescued the nine smugglers from the sinking ship, and also managed to seize over 3,000 kilograms (6,600 lb) of cocaine before the ship sank about two hours later.

Serviola was involved in a minor incident between Spain and the United Kingdom in July 2020, when she passed through the territorial waters of Gibraltar for about 45 minutes, before being escorted out by the Royal Navy vessel HMS Pursuer. Her intrusion into their territorial waters drew criticism from several UK maritime officials, who speculated that it was in response to newly imposed quarantine measures due to the COVID-19 pandemic.

In May 2022, Serviola brought the Spanish Ambassador to Côte d'Ivoire, Rafael Ortiz, to the port city of Abidjan on a diplomatic mission. The ship was presented to Ivorian officials in an effort to improve bilateral relations between the two countries' navies to combat piracy in the region.

Serviola was one of several craft that took part in the rescue of survivors from the Russian heavy-lift ship Ursa Major, which sank in the Mediterranean between Águilas in Spain and Oran in Algeria on the night of 23–24 December 2024.
