= Spanish patrol boat Vigía =

Spanish Navy patrol boat

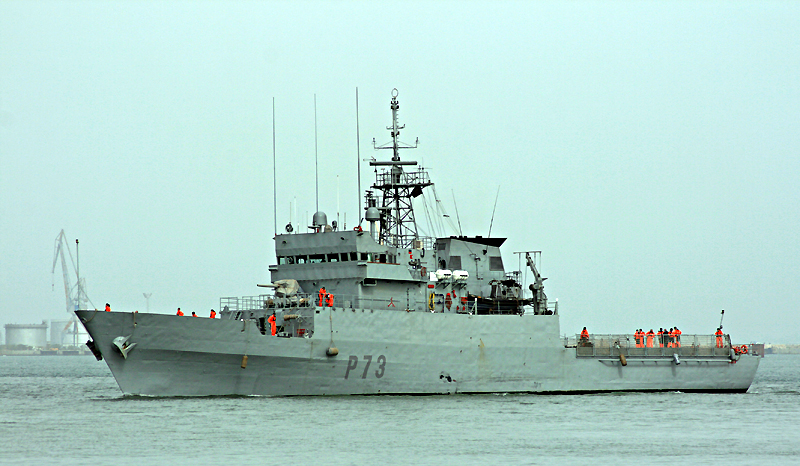

History

Spain
- Name: Vigía
- Builder: NAVANTIA
- Launched: 1992
- Commissioned: 23 March 1993
- Identification: MMSI number: 225332000

General characteristics
- Class & type: Serviola-class patrol boat
- Displacement: 1,200 tons
- Length: 68 m (223 ft 1 in)
- Beam: 10 m (32 ft 10 in)
- Draught: 3 m (9 ft 10 in)
- Installed power: 7,500 hp (5,600 kW)
- Propulsion: 2 variable-pitch propellers
- Speed: 15.3 knots (28.3 km/h; 17.6 mph) max
- Crew: 45
- Armament: 3"/50 caliber gun; 2 × 12.7 mm Browning machine guns

Vigía (P-73) is a Serviola-class patrol boat of the Spanish Navy built in 1992. The ship's primary missions are oceanic patrol, fishing control, escort, and maritime rescue.

== Description ==
Vigía is an offshore patrol vessel with a displacement of 1,200 tons. It is 68 m (223 ft 1 in) long, has a beam of 10 m (32 ft 10 in), and a draught of 3 m (9 ft 10 in). It is powered by two MTU engines which supply 7,500 horsepower (5,600 kW) to two variable-pitch propellers for a maximum speed of 15.3 knots (28.3 km/h; 17.6 mph). It is equipped with a single 3-inch (76 mm)/50 caliber gun and two 12.7 mm Browning machine guns, and has a crew of 45. Its flight deck can receive medium helicopters, and it hosts two rigid-hulled inflatable boats.

== History ==
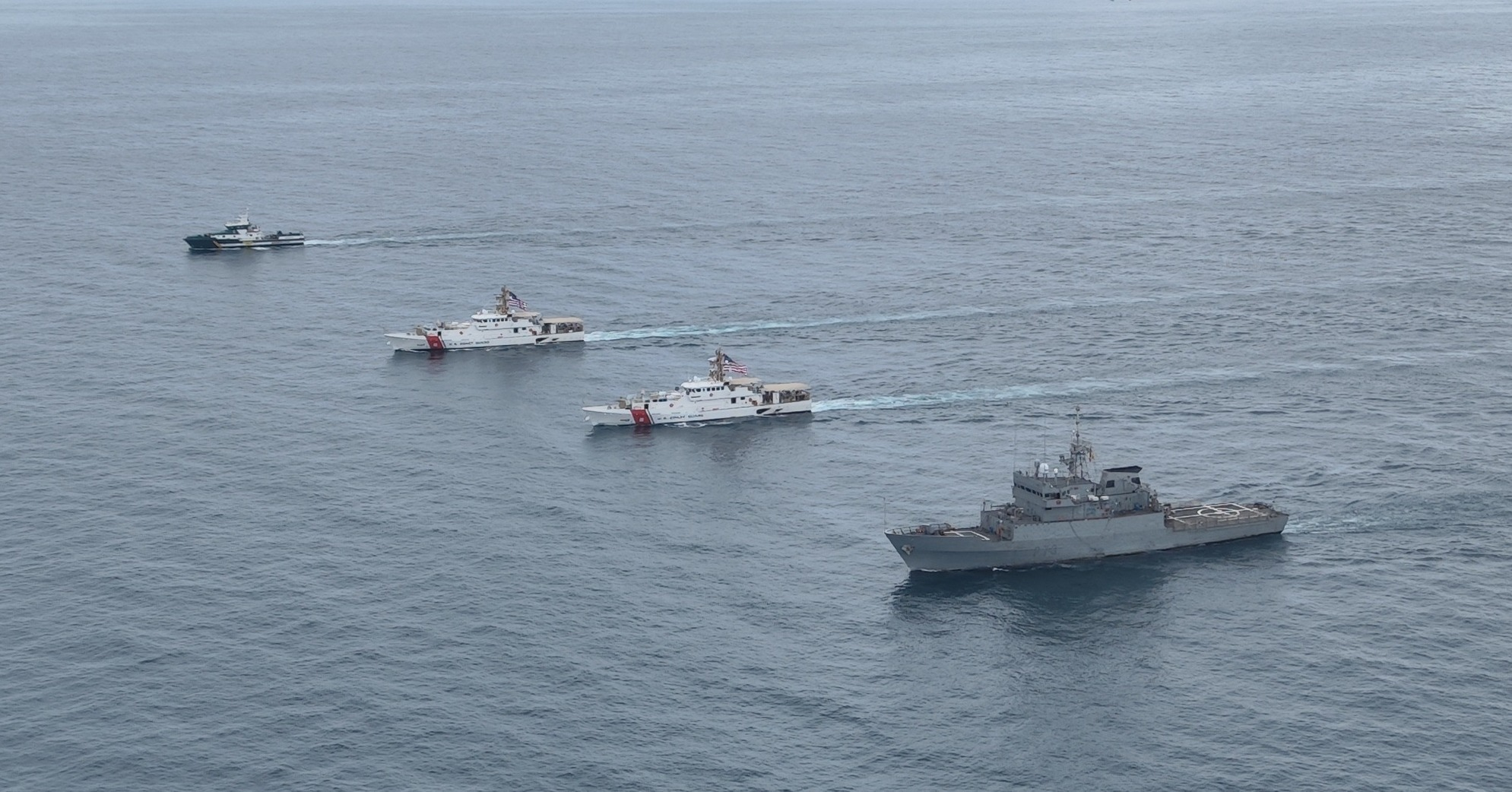
Vigía conducting an at-sea exchange exercise with USCGC Clarence Sutphin Jr. and USCGC John Scheuerman

Vigía was built by Navantia in Ferrol, and was delivered to the Spanish Navy on 23 March 1993. It has taken part in several international exercises over the course of its career, including Neo Tapon with NATO, Majestic Eagle, and Linked Seas.

In March 1995, Vigía set sail from Cádiz for Northeast Atlantic to protect fishing trawlers during the bloodless Turbot War with Canada, which had escalated earlier that month following the Canadian seizure of the vessel Estai.

One of the missions of Vigía is to conduct search and rescue operations. In 2014, a large flotilla of migrant vessels was detected in the Strait of Gibraltar. Vigía, along with Civil Guard and Maritime Rescue Service boats, captured a total of 94 boats with 920 immigrants aboard, of which Vigía rescued 6 boats and 48 people. In 2020, the ship took part in a search to find a missing sailor from a sunken fishing ship in the Alboran Sea.

A secondary mission of Vigía is to conduct cooperative and diplomatic missions in West Africa and the Gulf of Guinea. From February to June 2017, the vessel deployed to the Gulf of Guinea after visiting Mauritania, Cape Verde, Senegal, Ivory Coast, Cameroon and São Tomé and Príncipe. The vessel deployed to the region again in 2021, and also visited as far south as Luanda, Angola.
