= Spanish ship Ysabel =

Spanish Navy logistics support ship

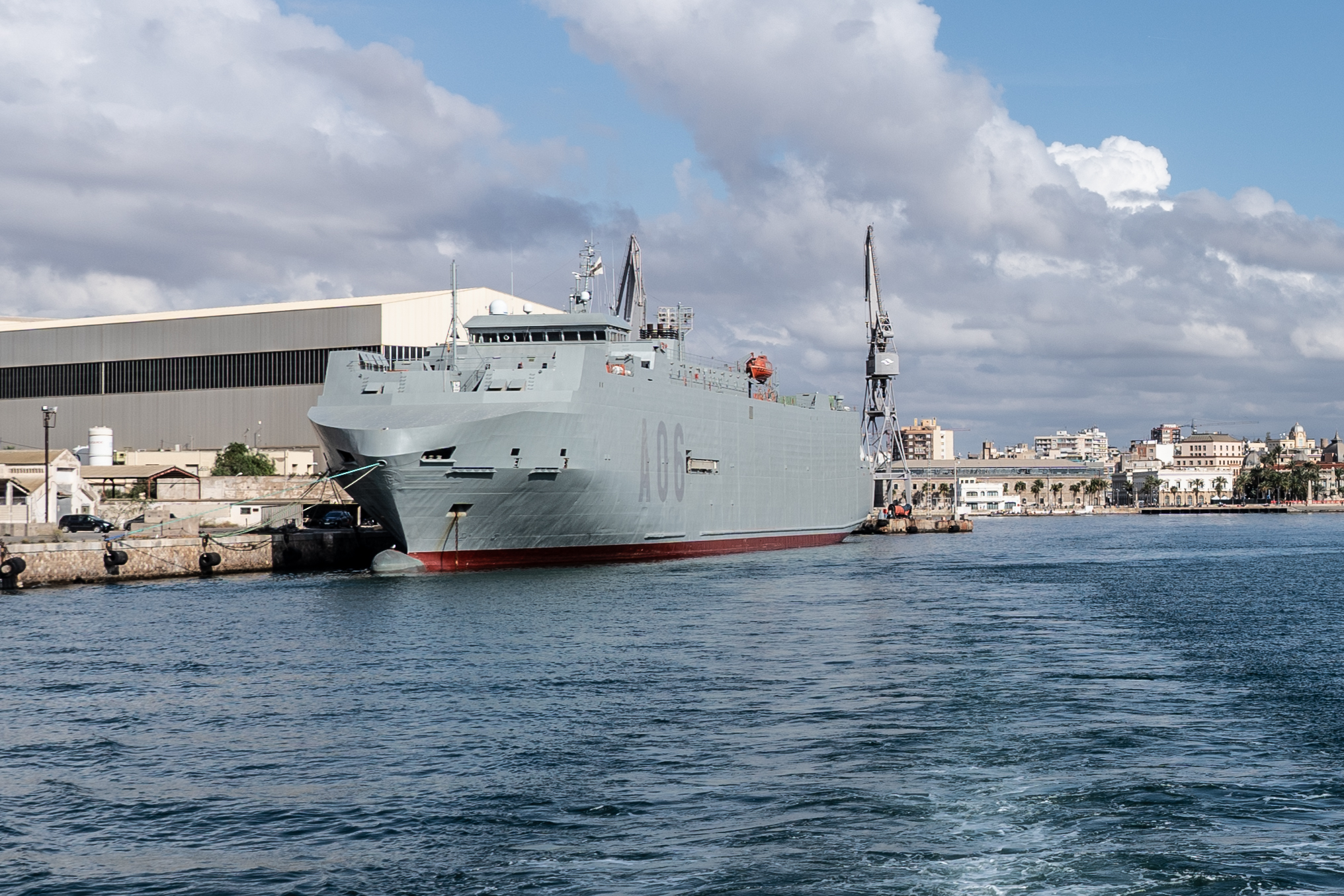

History

Spain
- Name: Ysabel
- Builder: Hijos de J. Barreras Shipyard
- Laid down: 21 March 2003
- Launched: 24 September 2003
- Commissioned: 2 June 2021
- Identification: IMO number: 9268409; Pennant number: A06

General characteristics
- Class & type: Suardiaz Galicia-class ro-ro cargo ship
- Tonnage: 16,361 GT
- Length: 149 m (488 ft 10 in)
- Beam: 21 m (68 ft 11 in)
- Draught: 5.9 m (19 ft 4 in)
- Installed power: 11,250 HP
- Speed: 15 knots (28 km/h; 17 mph) max

Ysabel (A06), sometimes called Reina Ysabel, is a roll-on/roll-off cargo ship and logistics support ship of the Spanish Navy purchased secondhand from the shipping company Suardiaz. The ship originally sailed under the name Suardiaz Galicia.

== Description ==
Ysabel is a roll-on/roll-off cargo ship that is designed to carry cargo that is driven on and off the ship via wheeled vehicles. This can include trailers, trucks, or cars. The ship is crewed by eighteen sailors and has a range of 7,200 miles (11,600 km). Reina Ysabel has a length of 149 m (488 ft 10 in), a width of 21 m (68 ft 11 in), and a draft of 5.9 m (19 ft 4 in). It has a tonnage of 16,361 gross tonnage (GT). The ship is propelled by twin Wärtsila 9L32 engines which supply a power of 11,258 horsepower (8,395 kW) for a maximum speed of 15 knots (28 km/h; 17 mph). Its cargo capacity is 110 trailers or 1,404 cars. It has seven decks and a 5.5 m (18 ft)-long ramp at the aft of the ship.

== History ==
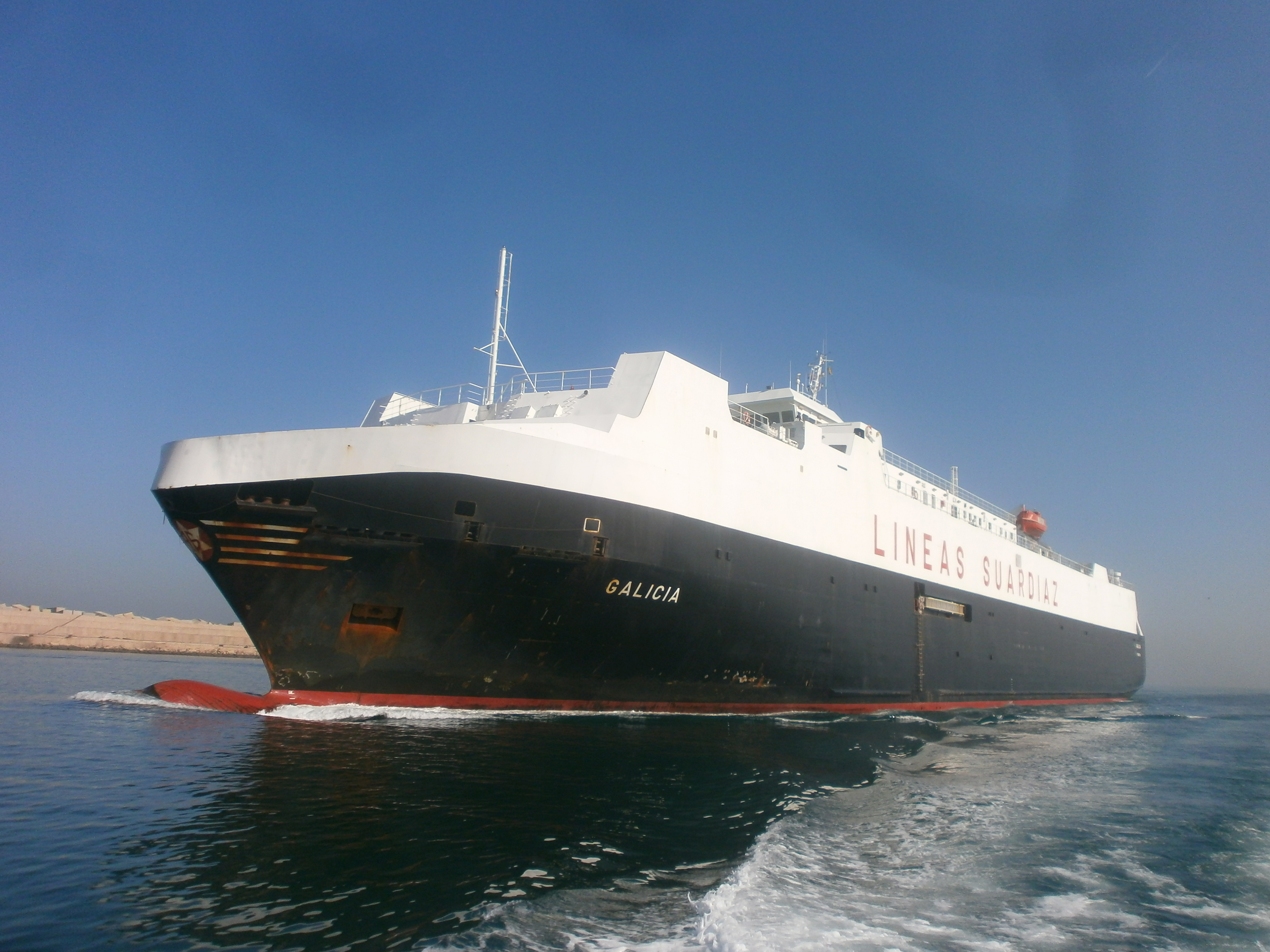
In Suardiaz Lines as Galicia

The ship was laid down on 21 March 2003 at the Hijos de J. Barreras Shipyard in Vigo, Spain, and was launched on 24 September of that year. It joined the fleet of the shipping company Suardiaz under the name Suardiaz Galicia.

At the end of 2020, the Spanish Navy purchased the ship from Suardiaz for a sum of 7.5 million Euros and renamed it Ysabel. The ship returned to its home port at Vigo to undergo the necessary modifications for its new role as a logistics support ship. Ysabel was acquired in order to replace the aging logistics ships El Camino Español and Martín Posadillo which were recently decommissioned. On 2 June 2021, the ship was commissioned into the Spanish Navy in Cartagena.

In April 2022, Ysabel was sent to Poland with supplies and weapons for Ukraine following the 2022 Russian invasion. In February 2023, the ship cruised to the Canary Islands, moving military material between Tenerife and Gran Canaria.
