= Spanish patrol boat Centinela =

Patrol boat in the Spanish Navy

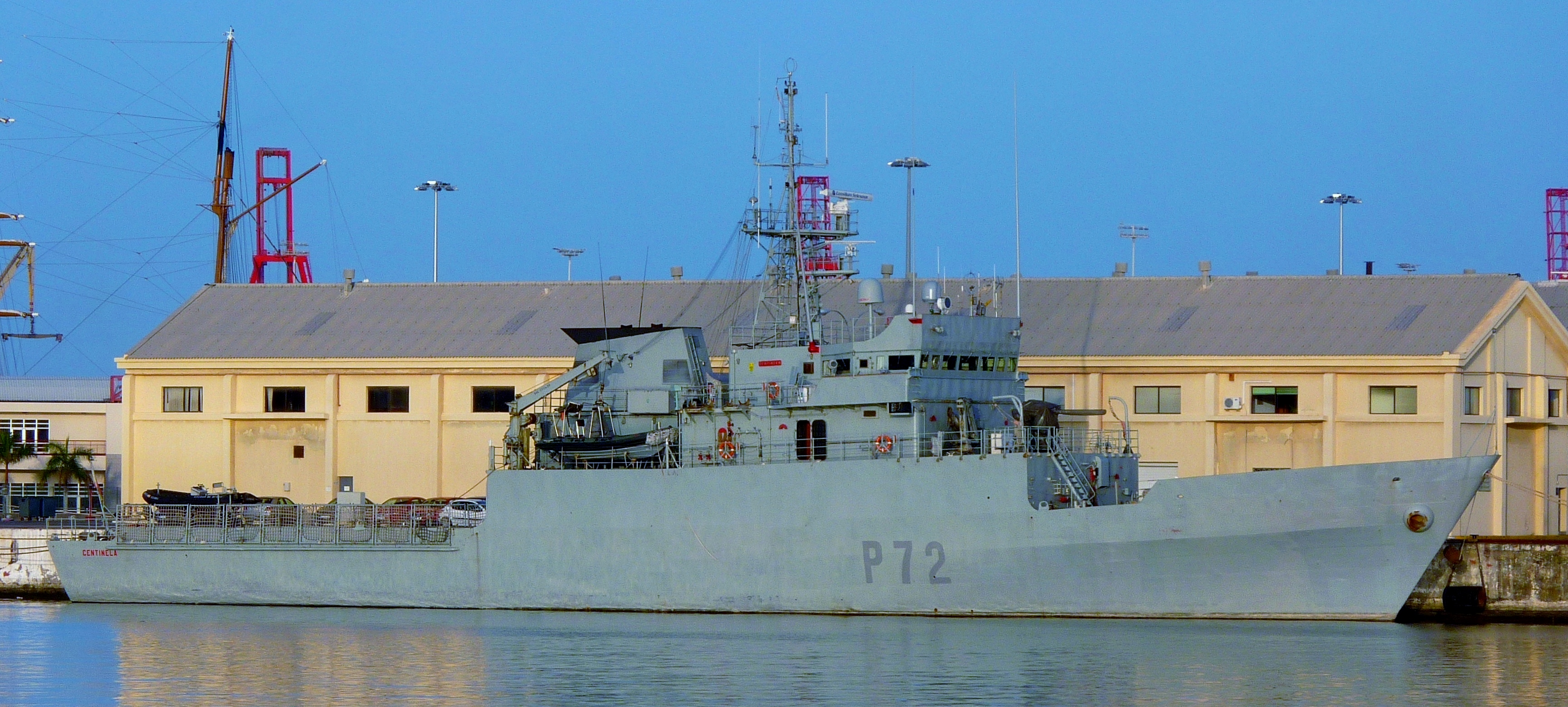

History

Spain
- Name: Centinela
- Namesake: Spanish word for "sentinel"
- Builder: NAVANTIA
- Launched: October 1990
- Home port: Ferrol, Galicia
- Identification: MMSI number: 225331000; Call Sign: EBBO

General characteristics
- Class & type: Serviola-class patrol boat
- Displacement: 1,200 tons
- Length: 68 m (223 ft 1 in)
- Beam: 10 m (32 ft 10 in)
- Draught: 3 m (9 ft 10 in)
- Installed power: ~4,000 HP
- Propulsion: 2 variable-pitch propellers
- Speed: 16.2 knots (30.0 km/h; 18.6 mph) max, 9.1 knots (16.9 km/h; 10.5 mph) avg
- Boats & landing craft carried: 2 Valiant-class 6.5-meter rigid hulled inflatable boats
- Crew: 46
- Armament: 1x 3-inch gun; 2x 12.7mm Browning machine guns; 1x MG-42 machine gun

Centinela (P-72) is a Serviola-class patrol boat of the Spanish Navy built in 1990. It conducts maritime security operations in the Strait of Gibraltar and the Gulf of Guinea.

== Description ==
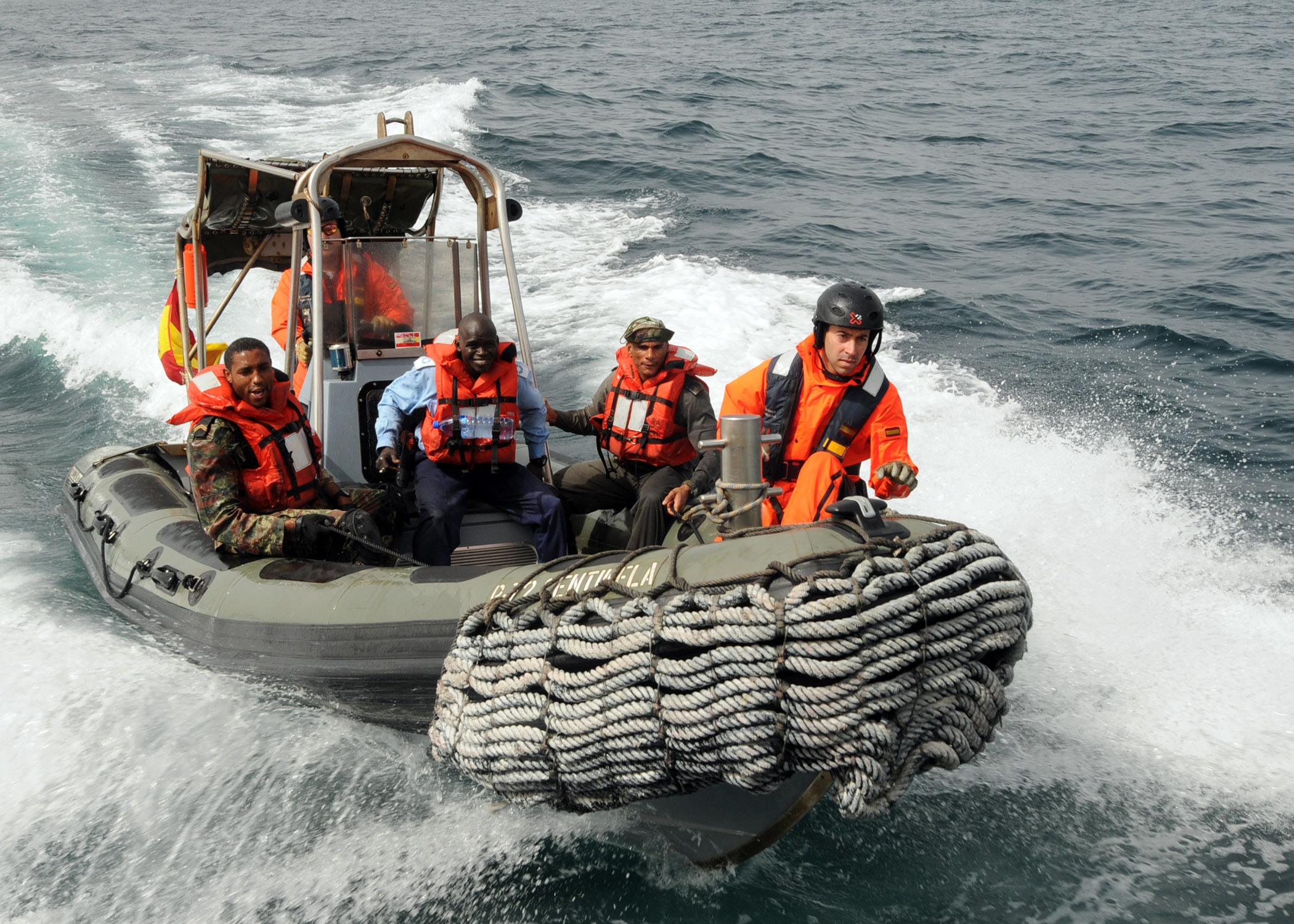
A rigid-hulled ship's boat of Centinela during training exercises with African navies

Centinela has a displacement of 1,200 tons. It is 68 m (223 ft) long, has a beam of 10 m (33 ft), and a draft of 3 m (9.8 ft). It is powered by two Bazán-MTU marine diesel engines which provide a total of roughly 4,000 horsepower. The ship's two variable-pitch propellers allow it to cruise at 9.1 knots, and have a maximum speed of 16.2 knots. The ship is also equipped with two cargo cranes, carries two 6.5-meter Valiant-class rigid hulled inflatable boats, and has enough provisions for a 25-day endurance.

Centinela's armament consists of a single 3-inch gun, two mounted 12.7mm Browning machine guns, and an MG-42 machine gun.

The crew of Centinela consists of 46 personnel, including eight officers, ten non-commissioned officers, and 28 seamen.

=== Coat of Arms ===
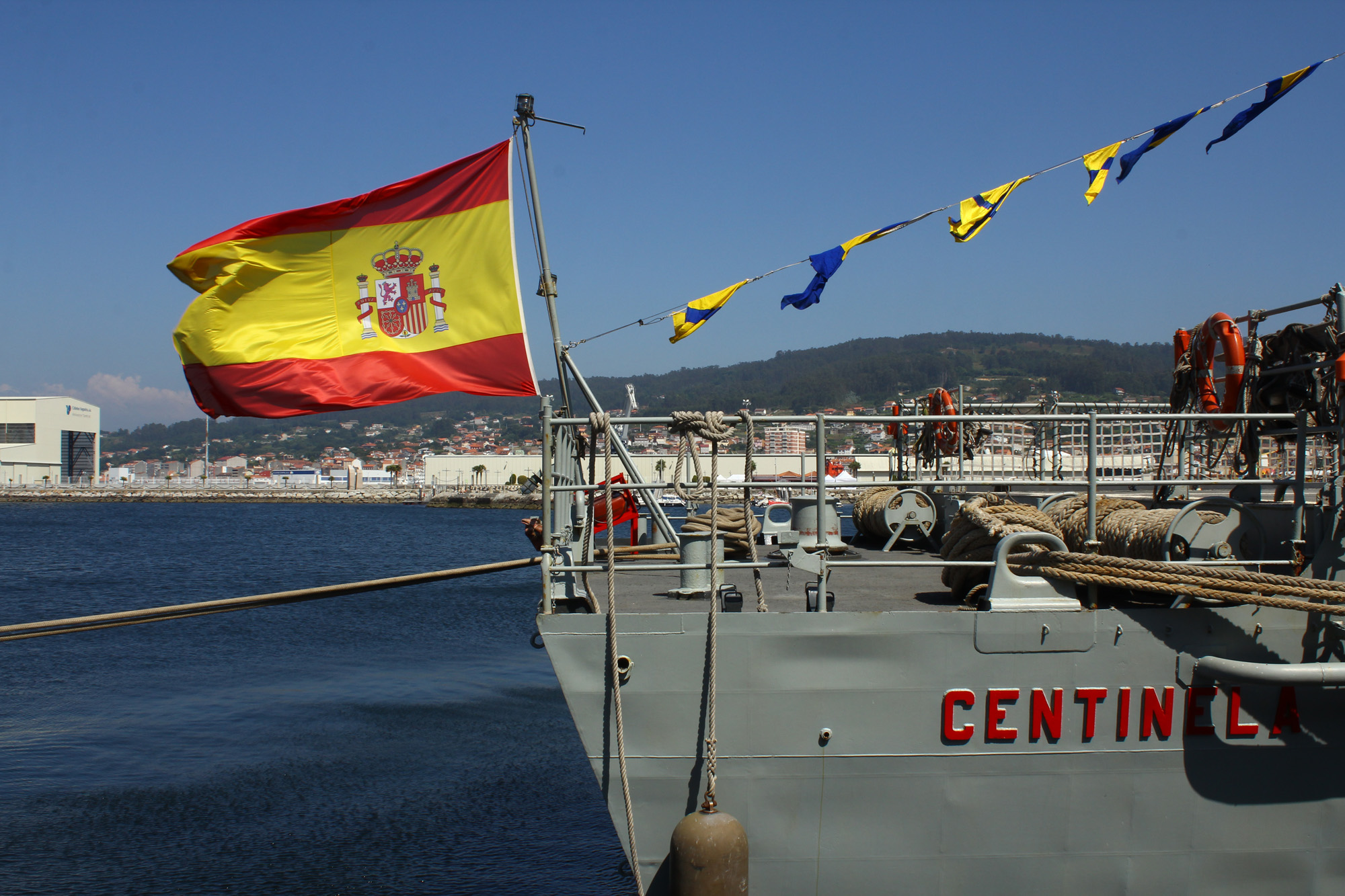
The Spanish flag on the stern of Centinela in 2014

The coat of arms of Centinela consists of two crossed carbine rifles, flanked by castles connected by a chain. In its center is a Dracaena draco tree, endemic to the ship's first home port in Las Palmas, Canary Islands.

== Mission ==
Centinela is an oceanic patrol vessel that operates primarily in Spanish maritime sovereignty, especially within the country's exclusive economic zone. It was designed to operate in open ocean even in adverse weather conditions. The ship conducts surveillance and maritime security missions, such as reporting on suspicious activities, combating violations of maritime law, and maintaining national security. In addition to this role, Centinela also acts as a training ship for naval school Midshipmen, provides a Spanish naval presence in foreign ports, and participates in public affairs missions.

== History ==
Centinela was built in Ferrol by Navantia in 1990. The ship was launched in October of that year and began sea trials on 27 August 1991. Initially, her home port was in Las Palmas, Canary Islands; she received her battle ensign from the town council on 9 July 1995. In 2011, her home port moved to Ferrol, Galicia.

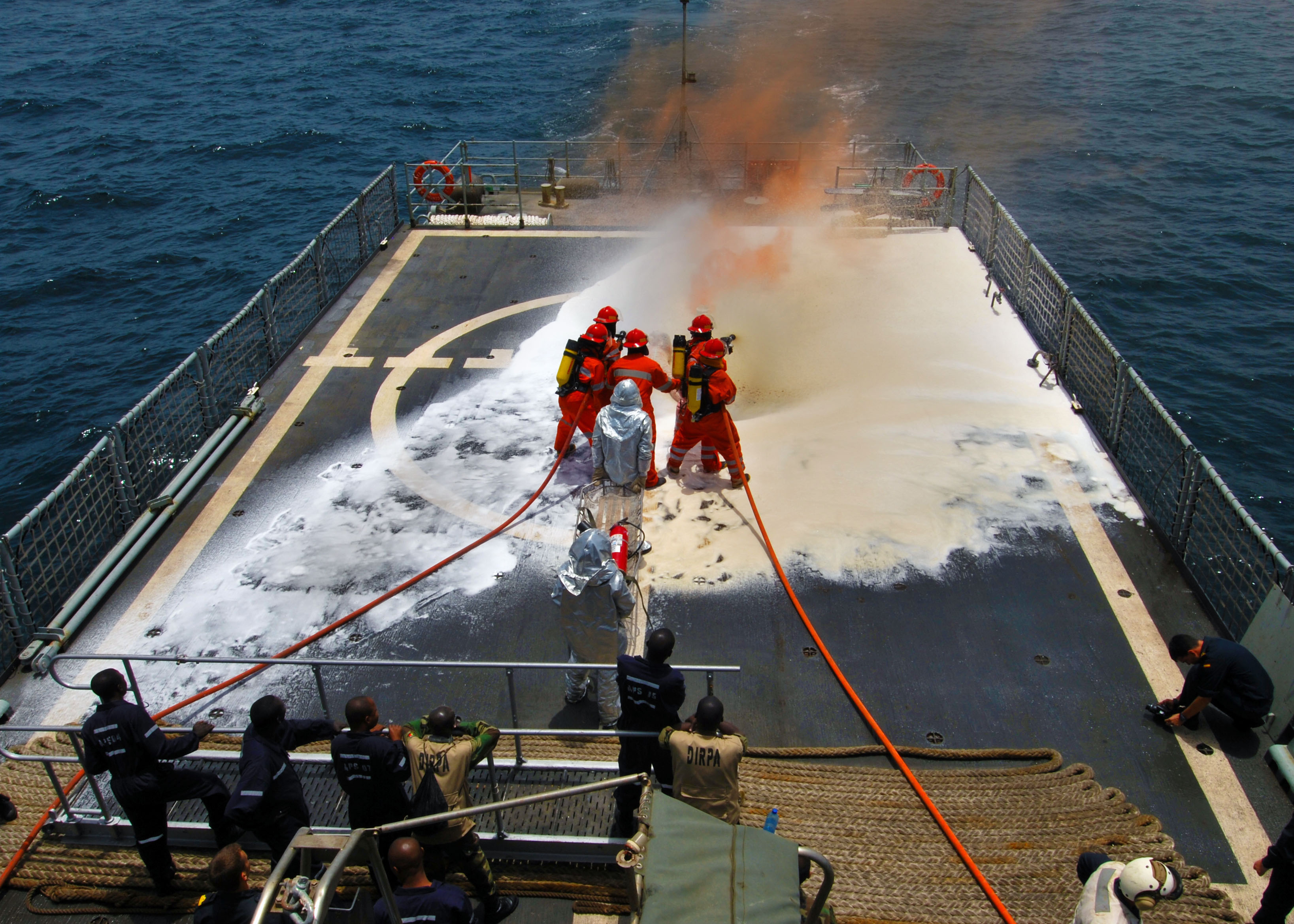
Sailors of Centinela demonstrating firefighting techniques during a 2010 training exercise

Centinela has been involved with numerous international training exercises, especially with coastal African countries. In 2010, the ship led flight deck training with ships from Senegal and the United States conducting maneuvering, firefighting, and replenishment on board Centinela. Sailors from Togo and Tanzania also participated in the training. In 2015, Centinela again conducted joint exercises with Senegal, this time in Dakar, focusing on knowledge sharing between Navy divers. On 10 October 2017, the ship joined French and African vessels in anti-piracy training as a part of the Grand African Navy Exercise for Maritime Operations.

In 2017, Centinela was involved in an incident on 4 July during which it was closely intercepted by HMS Sabre in British Gibraltar's territorial waters, which strobed lights and instructed the vessel to leave.
