= Serviola-class patrol boat =

Ship class

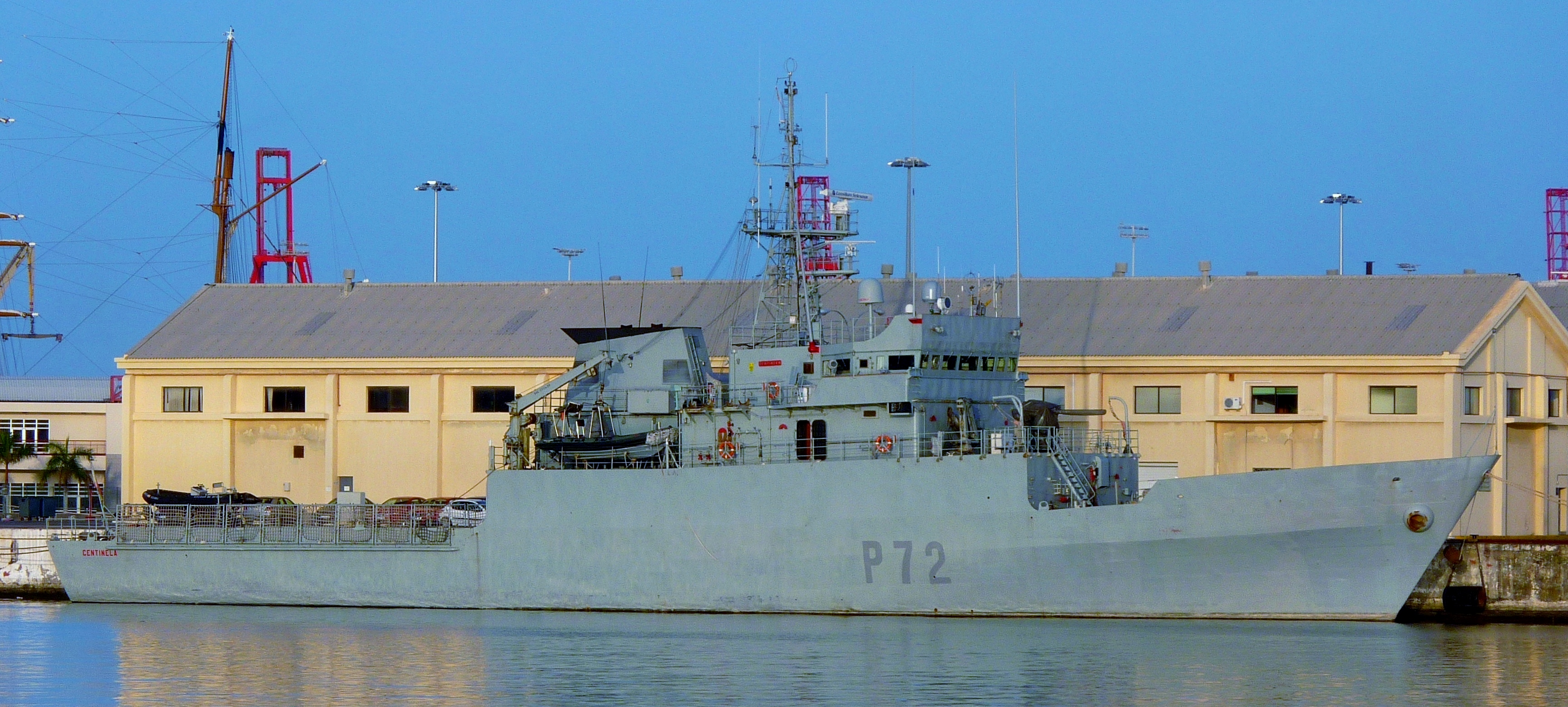
- Spanish Navy patrol ship Centinela

Class overview
- Name: Serviola class
- Builders: Empresa Nacional Bazán
- Operators: Spanish Navy
- Active: 4

General characteristics
- Type: Patrol boat
- Displacement: 1200 tons
- Length: 68 m (223 ft 1 in)
- Beam: 10.33 m (33 ft 11 in)
- Draft: 3.36 m (11 ft 0 in)
- Propulsion: 2 MTU engines, 7,500 hp (5,600 kW), 2 shafts with controllable pitch propellers, 2 stabilizing fins, 3 diesel generators of 195 KW ea
- Speed: 20 knots (37 km/h; 23 mph)
- Sensors & processing systems: Radar and surface / air Consilium RTM Selesmar 30 SIM; Consilium Navigation and Radar Selesmar RTM 25 XIM
- Armament: 2 × 12.7 mm guns; 1 × 3"/50 caliber gun

The Serviola-class patrol boats are a series of patrol boats built in 1990 at the Empresa Nacional Bazán (now Navantia) shipyard in Ferrol for the Spanish Navy. They entered service with the Spanish Navy from October 1992. They are based in the Galician port of Ferrol making most of their patrols along the Galician and Cantabrian coasts.

They are designed to remain at sea for long periods of time and withstand rough sea conditions without significant degradation of their capabilities. Each ship is equipped with a flight deck that allows it to operate medium-sized helicopters, a sick bay with six beds, and two rigid inflatable boats.

There are currently four ships in service.

On 3 May 2011 the Spanish patrol boat Atalaya entered waters around Gibraltar and ordered ships to leave the area. She met HMS Scimitar of the Royal Navy and left after about 90 minutes.

== Ships ==
Pennant	Name	Launched	Commissioned	Status	Call sign	Image
P-71	Serviola	10 May 1990	22 March 1991	Active		
P-72	Centinela	30 October 1990	24 September 1991	Active		
P-73	Vigía	14 April 1991	24 March 1992	Active		
P-74	Atalaya	22 November 1991	29 June 1992	Active		
