= 3-inch/50-caliber gun =

3-inch/50 caliber gun (Mk 22)
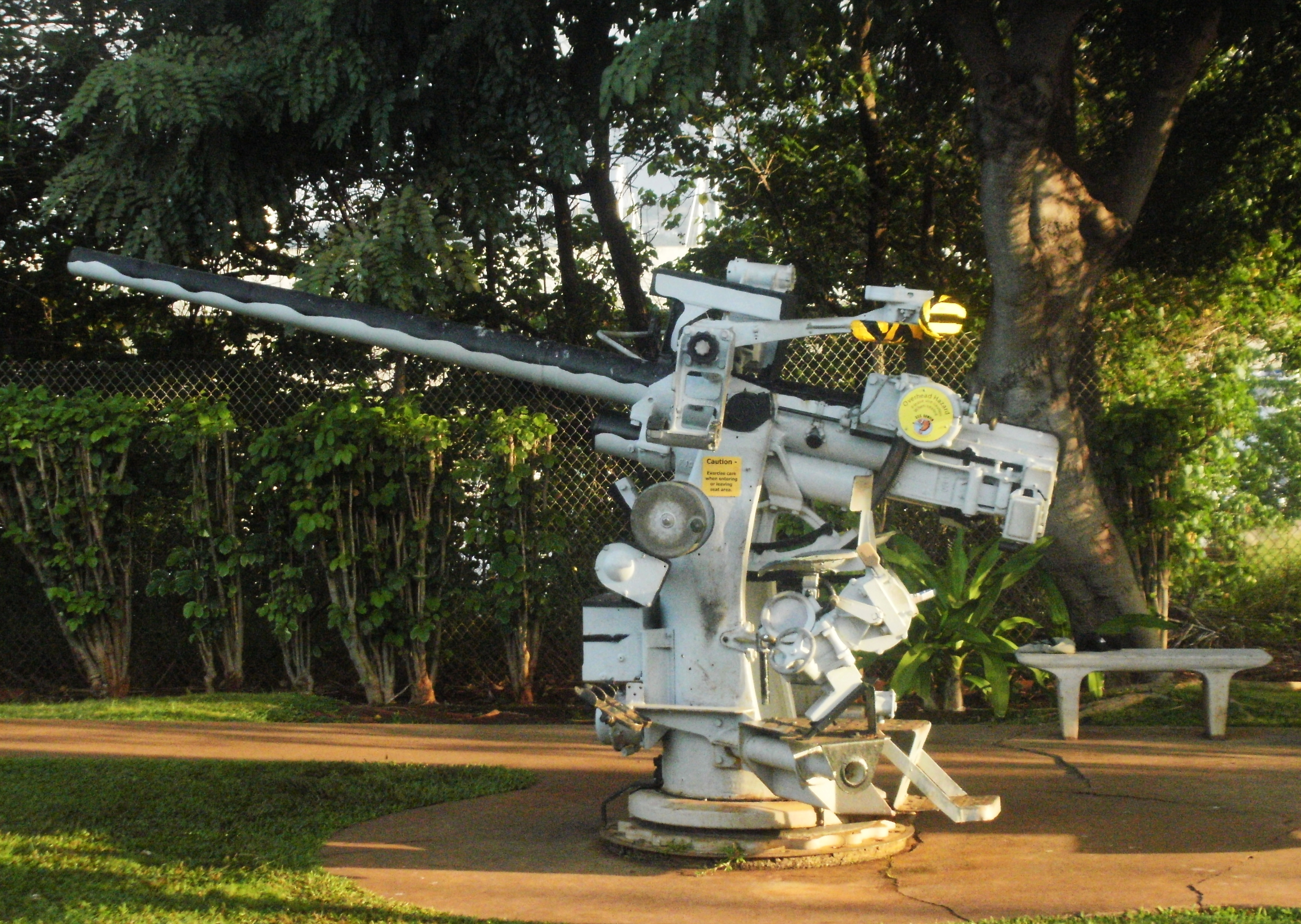
- Mark 22 3"/50 cal gun
- Type: Naval gun Anti-aircraft gun
- Place of origin: United States

Service history
- In service: 1900–1990 (US Navy)
- Used by: US Navy

Production history
- Designed: Mark 2: 1898 * Mark 10: 1915 * Mark 22: 1944
- Produced: 1900–1948
- Variants: Marks 2, 3, 5, 6, 8, 10, 17, 18, 19, 20, 21, and 22

Specifications
- Mass: Mark 2: 2,086 pounds (946 kg) (with breech); Mark 21: 1,760 pounds (800 kg)
- Length: Mark 2: 153.8 inches (3.91 m); Mark 21: 159.7 inches (4.06 m)
- Barrel length: Mark 2: 150 inches (380 cm) bore (50 calibers); Mark 21: 150.3 inches (382 cm) bore (50 calibres)
- Shell: complete round: 24 lb (11 kg); projectile weight: 13 lb (5.9 kg) projectile types: AP, AA (with VT proximity fuze), HE, Illumination
- Caliber: 3-inch (76 mm)
- Elevation: Pedestal Mount: -10° to +15°; AA Mount: -10° to +85°
- Traverse: 360°
- Rate of fire: Mark 2: 15 – 20 rounds per minute; Mark 22: 45 – 50 rounds per minute with autoloader
- Muzzle velocity: 2,700 ft/s (820 m/s)
- Maximum firing range: 14,600 yd (13,400 m) at 43° elevation; 30,400 ft (9,300 m) AA ceiling
- Sights: Peep-site and Optical telescope

The 3-inch/50-caliber gun (spoken "three-inch fifty-caliber") in United States naval gun terminology indicates the gun fired a projectile 3 inches (76 mm) in diameter, and the barrel was 50 calibers long (barrel length is 3 in × 50 = 150 in or 3.8 m). Different guns (identified by Mark numbers) of this caliber were used by the U.S. Navy and U.S. Coast Guard from 1900 through to 1990 on a variety of combatant and transport ship classes.

The gun is still in use with the Spanish Navy on Serviola-class patrol boats.

== Early low-angle guns ==
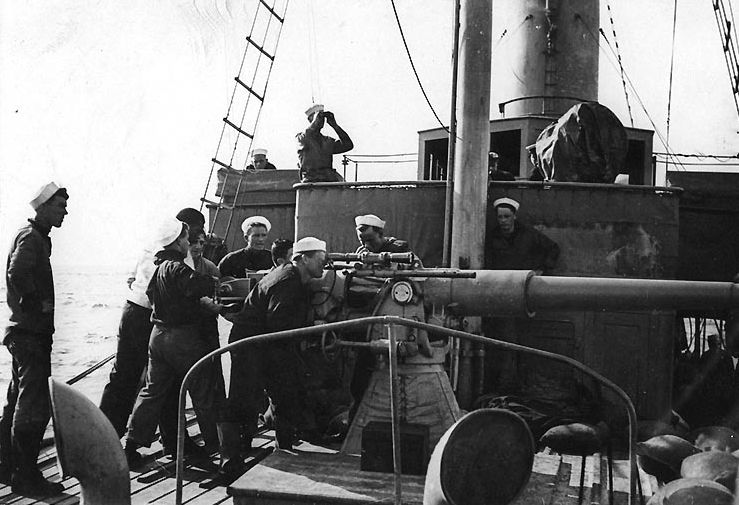
An early 3"/50 on USS Rambler (SP-211), 1918.

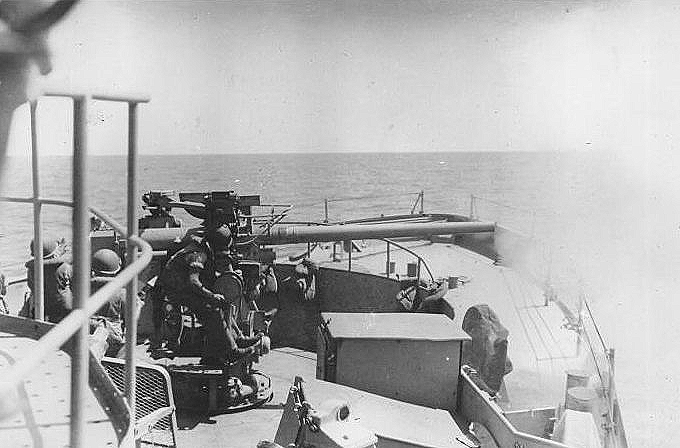
USS Pivot firing its forward 3"/50-caliber gun.

The US Navy's first 3-inch/50-caliber gun (Mark 2) was an early model with a projectile velocity of 2,100 feet (640 m) per second. Low-angle (single-purpose/non-anti-aircraft) mountings for this gun had a range of 7,000 yards (6,400 m) at the maximum elevation of 15 degrees. The gun entered service around 1900 with the Bainbridge-class destroyers, and was also fitted to Connecticut-class battleships. By World War II, these guns were found only on a few Coast Guard cutters and defensively equipped merchant ships.

Low-angle 3 inch/50-caliber guns (Marks 3, 5, 6, and 19) were originally mounted on ships built from the early 1900s through the early 1920s and were carried by submarines, auxiliaries, and merchant ships during World War II. These guns fired the same 2,700-foot-per-second (820 m/s) ammunition used by the following dual-purpose Marks, but with range limited by the maximum elevation of the mounting. These were built-up guns with a tube, partial-length jacket, hoop and vertical sliding breech block.

== Dual-purpose guns of the World Wars ==
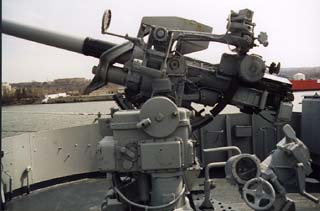
3"/50-caliber gun aboard USS Slater.

Dual-purpose 3-inch/50-caliber guns (Marks 10, 17, 18, and 20) first entered service in 1915 as a refit to USS Texas (BB-35), and were subsequently mounted on many types of ships as the need for anti-aircraft protection was recognized. During World War II, they were the primary gun armament on destroyer escorts, patrol frigates, submarine chasers, minesweepers, some fleet submarines, and other auxiliary vessels, and were used as a secondary dual-purpose battery on some other types of ships, including some older battleships. They also replaced the original low-angle 4"/50-caliber guns (Mark 9) on "flush-deck" Wickes and Clemson-class destroyers to provide better anti-aircraft protection. The gun was also used on specialist destroyer conversions; the "AVD" seaplane tender conversions received two guns; the "APD" high-speed transports, "DM" minelayers, and "DMS" minesweeper conversions received three guns, and those retaining destroyer classification received six.

These dual-purpose guns were "quick-firing", meaning that they used fixed ammunition, with powder case and projectile permanently attached, and handled as a single unit weighing 34 pounds (15 kg), as opposed to older guns and/or heavier guns, in which the shell and powder are handled and loaded separately, which reduces the weight of each handled component, but slows the loading process. The shells alone weighed about 13 pounds (5.9 kg), including an explosive bursting charge of 0.81 pounds (0.37 kg) for anti-aircraft (AA) rounds or 1.27 pounds (0.58 kg) for high-capacity (HC) rounds, the remainder of the weight being the steel casing. Maximum range was 14,600 yards (13,400 m) at 45 degrees elevation and ceiling was 29,800 feet (9,100 m) at 85 degrees elevation. Useful life expectancy was 4300 effective full charges (EFC) per barrel.

Quick-firing is not to be confused with the "rapid-fire" of later gun mounts that used an autoloader mechanism to insert the fixed quick-firing ammunition into the breech. This in turn is not to be confused to a fully automatic gun, as the autoloader was still manually filled with shells.

== Submarine deck guns ==
The 3"/50-caliber gun Marks 17 and 18 was first used as a submarine deck gun on R-class submarines launched in 1918–1919. At the time it was an improvement on the earlier 3"/23-caliber gun. After using larger guns on many other submarines, the 3"/50-caliber gun Mark 21 was specified as the standard deck gun on the Porpoise- through Gato-class submarines launched in 1935–1942. The small gun was chosen to remove the temptation to engage enemy escort vessels on the surface. The gun was initially mounted aft of the conning tower to reduce submerged drag, but early in World War II it was shifted to a forward position at the commanding officer's option. Wartime experience showed that larger guns were needed. This need was initially met by transferring 4"/50-caliber guns from S-class submarines as they were shifted from combat to training roles beginning in late 1942. Later, the 5"/25-caliber gun, initially removed from battleships sunk or damaged in the attack on Pearl Harbor and later manufactured in a submarine version, became standard.

== Cold War anti-aircraft gun ==
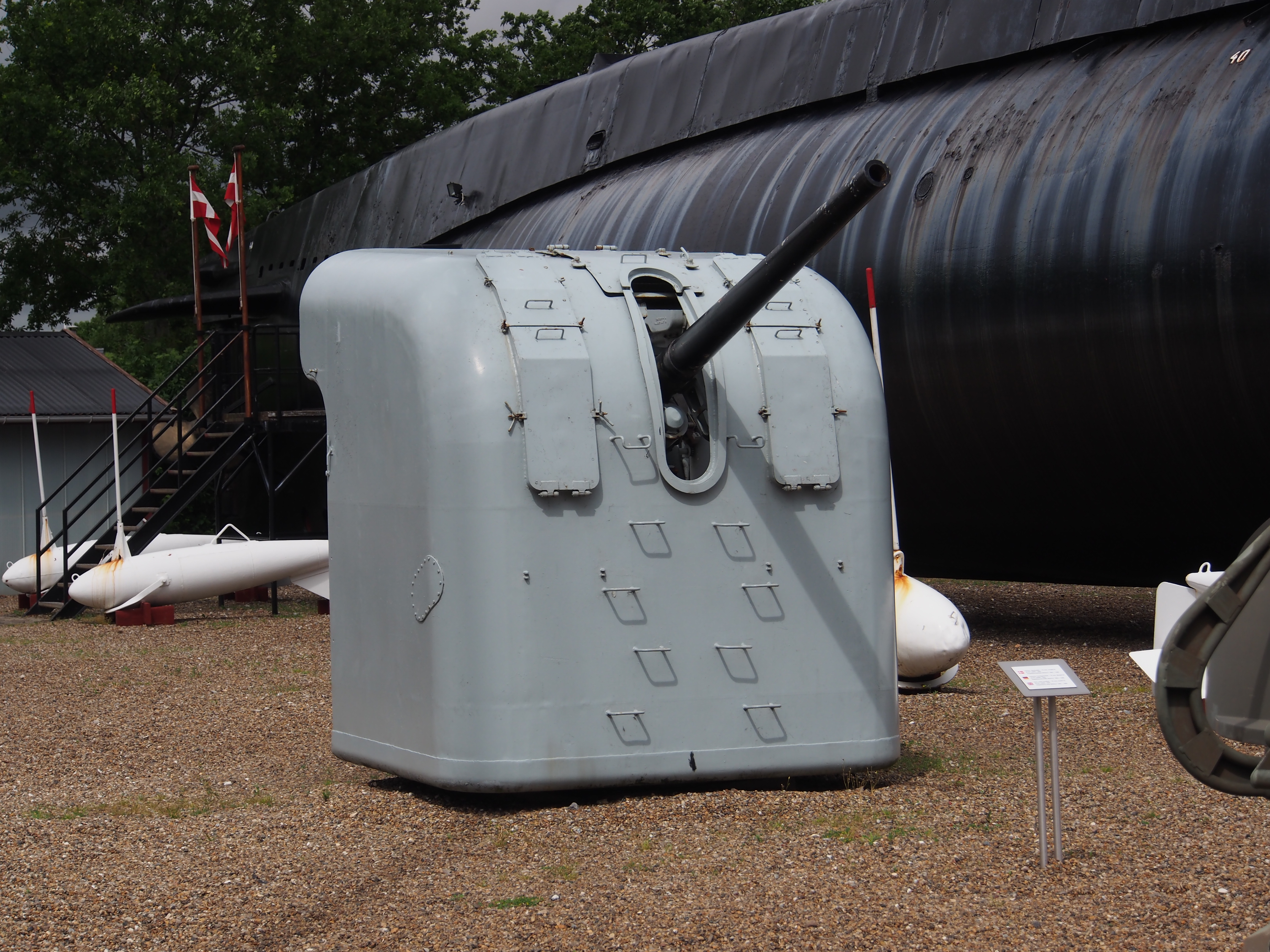
3-inch/50 Mk. 22 in Mk. 22 mounting in Aalborg Maritime Museum.

During the final year of the Second World War, it was found that multiple hits from Oerlikon 20 mm cannon and Bofors 40 mm guns were often unable to shoot down high-speed Japanese kamikaze aircraft at short ranges before they hit Allied ships; the 3-inch/50-caliber gun was adopted as a more powerful replacement for these weapons.

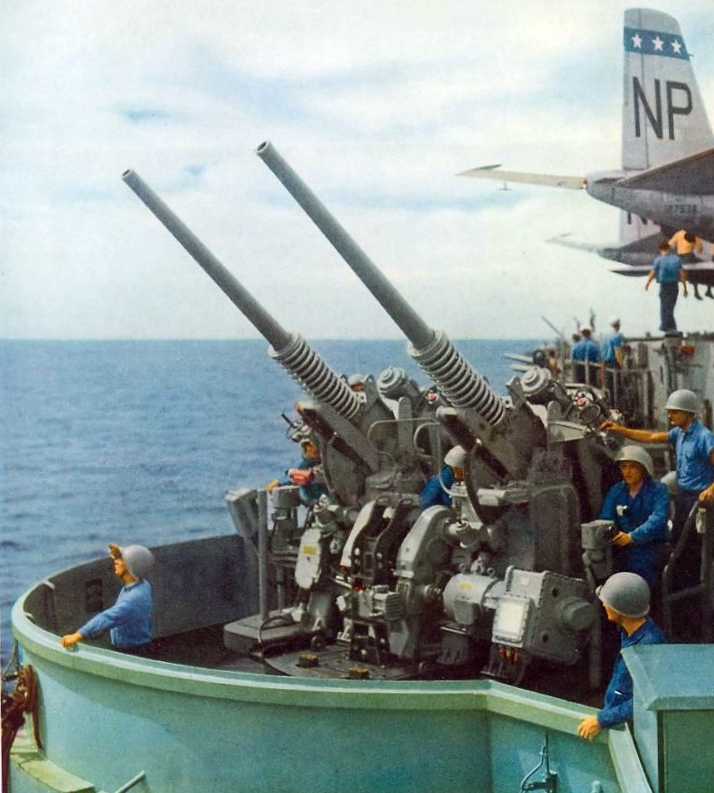
Mk. 33 twin mount on USS Wasp, in 1954.

The 3-inch/50-caliber gun (Mark 22) was a semiautomatic anti-aircraft weapon with a power-driven automatic loader and was fitted as single and twin mounts. The single mount was to be exchanged for a twin 40 mm antiaircraft gun mount, and the twin 3-inch/50 for a quadruple 40 mm mount, on Essex-class aircraft carriers, and Allen M. Sumner and Gearing-class destroyers. Although intended as a one-for-one replacement for the 40 mm mounts, the new 3-inch (76 mm) mounts were heavier than expected, and on most ships, the mounts could only replace Bofors guns on a two-for-three basis. The mounts were of the dual purpose, open-base-ring type and the right and left gun assemblies were identical. The mounts used a common power drive that could train at a rate of 30 degrees/second and elevate from 15 degrees to 85 degrees at a rate of 24 degrees/second. The cannon was fed automatically from an on-mount magazine which was replenished by two loaders on each side of the cannon.

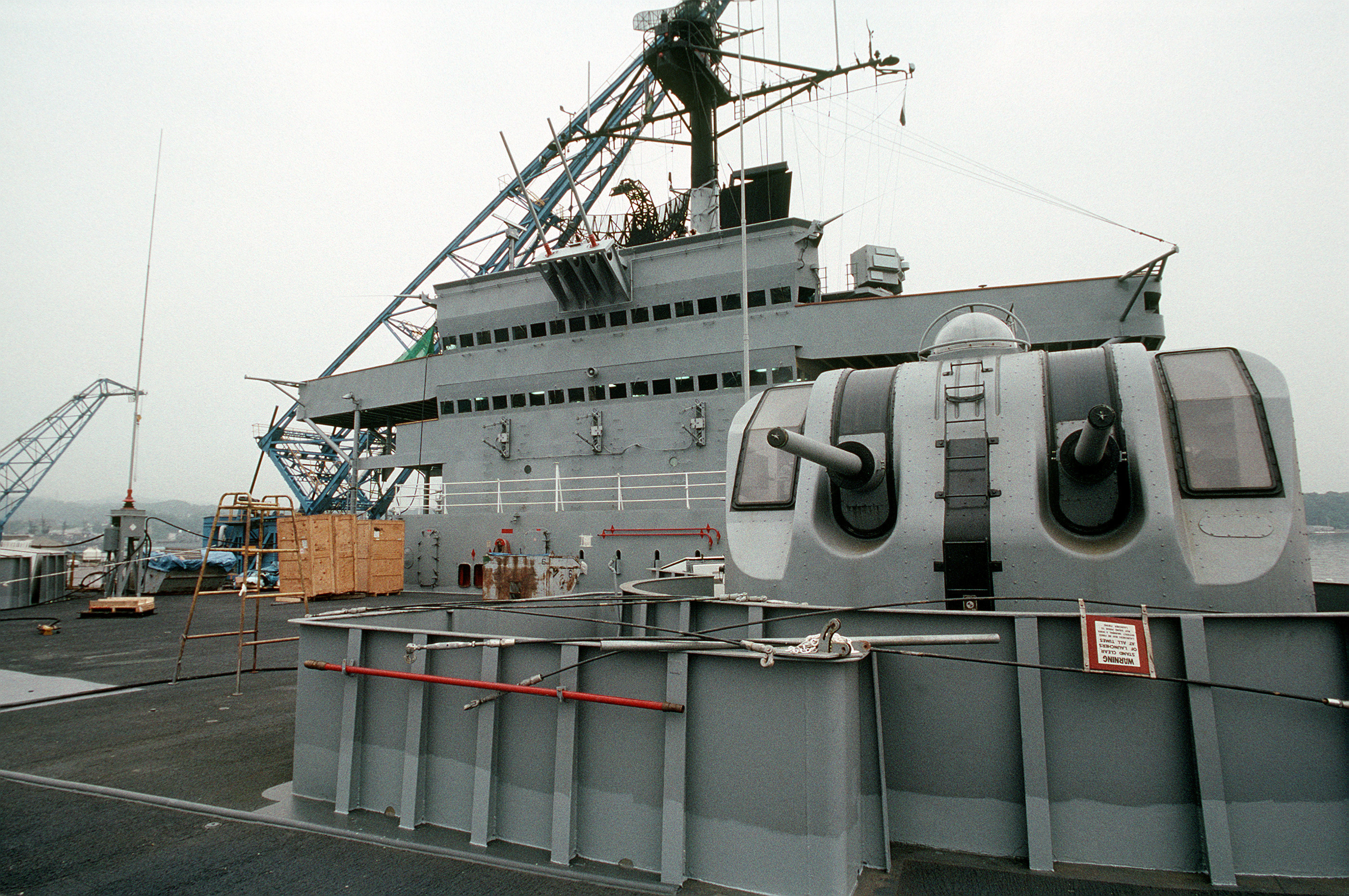
Mk. 33 Mod. 13 enclosed twin mount on USS Blue Ridge, in 1991.

With proximity fuze and fire-control radar, a twin 3-inch/50 mount firing 50 rounds per minute per barrel was considered more effective than a quad Bofors 40 mm gun against subsonic aircraft, but relatively ineffective against supersonic jets and cruise missiles. Destroyers that were modernized during the Fleet Rehabilitation and Modernization (FRAM) program of the 1960s had their 3-inch (76 mm) guns removed. Experimentation with an extended range variant the fully automatic 3"/70 Mark 26 gun was abandoned as shipboard surface-to-air missiles were developed. The United States Navy considered contemporary 5-inch/38-caliber guns and 5-inch/54-caliber Mark 42 guns more effective against surface targets. In 1992, the 3-inch/50-caliber main battery on USCGC Storis was removed and was supposedly the last 3-inch/50-caliber gun in service aboard any US warship, although US Navy Charleston-class amphibious cargo ships retained their forward mounts until USS El Paso (LKA-117) was decommissioned in 1994. The gun is still in service on warships of the Philippine Navy.

The 17 Asheville-class gunboats mounted a single 3-inch/50 Mk 34 as their primary armament.

== Ships mounting 3-inch/50-caliber guns ==
=== World War I ===
- Bainbridge-class destroyers
- Chester-class cruisers
- Connecticut-class battleships
- Indiana-class battleships
- Mississippi-class battleships
- Nevada-class battleships
- New York-class battleships
- Paulding-class destroyers
- Pennsylvania-class battleships
- Pennsylvania-class cruisers
- R-class submarines
- St. Louis-class cruisers
- Smith-class destroyers
- South Carolina-class battleships
- Tennessee-class cruisers
- Truxtun-class destroyers
- Virginia-class battleships

=== World War II ===
- The 3-inch/50 was standard-issue on at least 63 classes of ships that have a strong association with World War II. The total number of vessels amounts to
  - 3 battleships
  - 10 light cruisers
  - 119 submarines (est. maximum 119 installed)
  - 498 destroyer escorts and frigates (1494 installed, 111 removed)
  - 1110 patrol boats, mine sweepers and submarine chasers (1110 up to 1453 installed)
  - 161 landing craft / amphibious assault ships (247 installed)
  - 116+ auxiliaries (274 installed)
- The submarines were built in the 1930s under the limitations of the Washington Naval Treaty and its successors during a period of isolationism and economic austerity. The division into classes was typically a result of construction during a particular fiscal year, but the number built each year was small. The Gatos became a mass-produced iteration of this line of research and development, because they coincided with the Two-Ocean Navy Act. Starting with the Balao class of submarines, the 5-inch/25-caliber gun became the standard deck gun of the US Navy
  - 2 Cachalot (FY33)
  - 10 Porpoise (FY34, FY35)
  - 6 Salmon (FY36)
  - 10 Sargo (FY37, FY38)
  - 12 Tambor (FY39, FY40)
  - 2 Mackerel (FY40)
  - 77 Gato (FY41)
- Destroyer escorts were a relative late-comer with production commencing in 1942 and were all mass-produced. They were quick to build and entered service in 1943. Later war-time classes had a main armament of two 5-inch/38, APD conversions had one such gun. Separation into classes is a result of different propulsion systems used and whether or not torpedoes were carried.
  - 3 guns per vessel
  - probably all manually loaded Mark 21 or Mark 22
  - 65 Evarts (diesel-electric, short hull, no torpedoes)
  - 102 Buckley (turbo-electric, 3 torpedoes)
    - 37 converted to APDs after commissioning, all 3-inch guns removed
  - 72 Cannon (diesel-electric, 3 torpedoes)
  - 85 Edsall (geared diesel, 3 torpedoes)
  - 78 Captain-class frigates
    - 32 of 97 Evarts and 46 of 148 Buckley converted before commissioning, all 3-inch guns retained
  - 75 Tacoma-class frigates (3 guns per ship)
    - essentially a destroyer escort with a merchant hull and triple expansion steam engines)
  - 21 Colony-class frigates (3 guns per ship)
    - 21 of 96 Tacoma in Royal Navy service
- Converted destroyers of the WW1-era Wickes and Clemson classes were equipped with 3-inch/50 guns while being converted to high speed transports (3 guns), minelayers (3), minesweepers (3) or seaplane tenders (2), those that stayed as destroyers were refitted with up to 6 guns.
- Patrol boats of less than 1000 tons, some of which were wooden boats. These minesweepers were equipped with anti-submarine warfare equipment and their designs are closely related to the submarine chasers. Submarine chasers can be characterized as smaller, cheaper, coastal waters destroyer escorts. All ships in this group used diesel propulsion.
  - 2 Raven-class minesweepers (1 per boat)
  - 343 PC-461-class submarine chasers (1 or 2 per boat)
  - 123 Admirable-class minesweepers (1 per boat)
  - 68 PCE-842-class patrol crafts (1 per boat
  - 95 Auk-class minesweepers (1 per boat)
  - 481 YMS-1-class yard minesweepers (1 per boat)
- Amphibious Assault Ships
  - 130 Landing Craft Support (1 per vessel)
  - Attack transports
    - Based on pre-war cargo ships
      - 8 Harris-class (4 per ship)
      - 2 McCawley-class (4 per ship)
      - 5 Heywood-class (4 per ship)
      - John Penn (APA-23) (4)
      - Edward Rutledge (APA-24) (1)
    - Type C3 ship
      - 7 President Jackson-class (4 per ship)
      - 3 Arthur Middleton-class (4 per ship)
      - 2 Frederick Funston-class (2 per ship)
    - Type P1 ship
      - 2 Doyen-class (4 per ship)
- Auxiliary vessels, typically made of a cargo or tanker hull
  - T1 tanker
    - 23 Patapsco-class gasoline tankers (4 per ship)
    - 34 Mettawee-class gasoline tankers (1 per ship)
  - T2 tanker
    - 16 (geared turbine) Kennebec-class oilers (4 per ship)
    - 14 (turbo-electric) Suamico-class oilers (4 per ship)
    - 12 (turbo-electric) Escambia-class oilers (4 per ship)
  - T3 tanker
    - 5 Chiwawa-class oilers (4 per ship)
    - 23 of 35 Cimarron-class oilers (4 per ship)
  - C1 Cargo
    - 63 Alamosa-class cargo ships (C1-M-AV1) (1 per ship)
  - C2 Cargo
    - 7 La Salle-class transports (C2-S-B1) (4 per ship)
    - 2 Storm King-class transports (C2-S-AJ1) (4 per ship)
    - 8 Mount Hood-class ammunition ships (C2-S-AJ1) (4 per ship)
    - 7 Lassen-class ammunition ships (4 per ship)
  - C3 Cargo
    - 4 Aegir-class submarine tenders (4 per ship)
  - Liberty Ships
    - 18 Armadillo-class tankers (Z-ET1-S-C3) (1 per ship)
    - 48 of 65 Crater-class cargo ships (EC2-S-C1) (1 per ship)
    - 16 Guardian-class radar picket ships (Z-EC2-S-C5) (2 per ship)
    - 11 Acubens-class stores ships (EC2-S-C1) (1 per ship)
  - 40 Ailanthus-class net laying ships (1 per ship)
  - 15 Cohoes-class net laying ships (1 per ship)
  - 32 Aloe-class net laying ships (1 per ship)
  - 10 Portunus-class motor boat tenders (1 per ship)
  - 12 Aristaeus-class repair ships (1 per ship)
  - 49 Sotoyomo-class tugboats (1 per boat)
  - 29 Cherokee-class fleet tugs (1 per boat)
  - 27 Abnaki-class fleet tugs (1 per boat)
  - 17 Adria-class stores ships (1 per ship)
  - 6 Mizar-class stores ships (3 or 4 per ship)
  - 9 Chanticleer-class submarine rescue ships (2 per ship)
  - 3 Penguin-class submarine rescue ships (1 per ship)
  - 2 Pigeon-class submarine rescue ships (2 per ship)
  - 4 Anchor-class rescue and salvage ships (1 per ship)
  - 13 Cactus-class buoy tenders (1 per ship)
  - 6 Mesquite-class buoy tenders (1 per ship)
  - 20 Iris-class buoy tenders (1 per ship)
- Others
  - Omaha-class cruisers (6 to 8 per ship, upgraded from 2)
  - USS Arkansas (BB-33) (10, upgraded from 8)
  - New York-class battleships (10 per ship, upgraded from 8)
  - Treasury-class cutters
  - Temporarily installed on various other ships in lieu of 1.1"/75-caliber guns

=== Post–World War II ===
Individual ships:

- USS Bainbridge (CGN-25) – built with 2 twin mounts
- HMCS Bonaventure (CVL 22) – built with 4 twin mounts, reduced to 2 during 1967 refit (Canada)
- USS Juneau (CL-119) – refit with 7 twin mounts (Note: All of the Juneau-class cruisers were planned for refit, but only Juneau was converted.)
- USS Manchester (CL-83) – refit with 8 twin mounts
- USS Mississippi (BB-41) – refit with 2 twin mounts as training ship
- USS Norfolk (DL-1) – built with 4 twin mounts
- USS Truxtun (CGN-35) – built with 2 single mounts
- USS Tulare (LKA-112) – built with 6 twin mounts
- HMS Victorious (R38) – refit with 6 twin mounts

Ship classes:

- Allen M. Sumner-class destroyers – refit up to 6 guns
- Anchorage-class dock landing ships – built with 4 twin mounts
- Annapolis-class destroyers – built with one Mark 33 twin mount forward (Canada)
- Asheville-class gunboats – built with a single mount
- Ashtabula-class oiler – built with 4 single mounts
- Austin-class amphibious transport docks – built with 4 twin mounts
- Baltimore-class cruisers – refit up to 20 guns
- Belknap-class cruisers – built with 2 single mounts
- Blue Ridge-class command ships – built with 4 twin mounts
- Bronstein-class frigates – built with 1 twin and 1 single mount
- Charleston-class amphibious cargo ships – built with 4 twin mounts
- Claud Jones-class destroyer escorts – built with 2 single mounts
- De Soto County-class tank landing ships – built with 3 twin mounts
- Dealey-class destroyer escorts – built with 1 twin and 2 single mounts
- Denebola-class stores ships – built with 2 twin mounts
- Des Moines-class cruisers – built with 12 twin mounts
- Essex-class aircraft carriers – refit up to 24 guns
- Farragut-class destroyers – built with 2 twin mounts (Note: The Farragut class is sometimes referred to as Coontz-class, because the fourth ship of the class—USS Coontz, designed ordered as a guided missile destroyer variant—was completed first.)
- Fletcher-class destroyers – refit up to 6 guns
- Forrest Sherman-class destroyers – built with 2 twin mounts
- Gearing-class destroyers – refit up to 6 guns
- Guardian-class radar picket ships – converted from Liberty ships with 2 single mounts
- Iwo Jima-class amphibious assault ships – built with 4 twin mounts, some reduced to 2 mounts to provide space for missile launchers
- Kilauea-class ammunition ships – built with 4 twin mounts
- Leahy-class cruisers – built with 2 twin mounts
- Mackenzie-class destroyers – built with one Mark 33 twin mount aft except HMCS Qu'Appelle, which received two Mark 33 twin mounts (one forward, one aft) (Canada)
- Mars-class combat stores ships – built with 4 twin mounts
- Midway-class aircraft carriers – refit up to 40 guns
- Mitscher-class destroyers – built with 2 twin mounts
- Neosho-class fleet replenishment oilers – built with 4 or 6 twin mounts
- Newport-class tank landing ships – built with 2 twin mounts
- Oregon City-class cruisers – refit up to 20 guns
- Raleigh-class amphibious transport docks – built with 4 twin mounts
- Restigouche-class destroyers – built with one Mark 33 twin mount aft, those refitted to the Improved Restigouche configuration had them removed (Canada)
- Rigel-class stores ships – built with 2 twin mounts
- Sacramento-class fast combat support ships – built with 4 twin mounts
- Simon Lake-class submarine tenders – built with 2 twin mounts
- St. Laurent-class destroyers – built originally with 2 Mark 33 twin mounts, later had one mount removed (Canada)
- Suribachi-class ammunition ships – built with 2 twin mounts
- Terrebonne Parish-class tank landing ships – built with 3 twin mounts
- Thomaston-class dock landing ships – built with 6 twin mounts
- Wichita-class replenishment oilers – built with 4 twin mounts
- Worcester-class cruisers – built with 2 single and 10 twin mounts
- Reliance-class cutters – built with 1 single mount

== Gallery ==
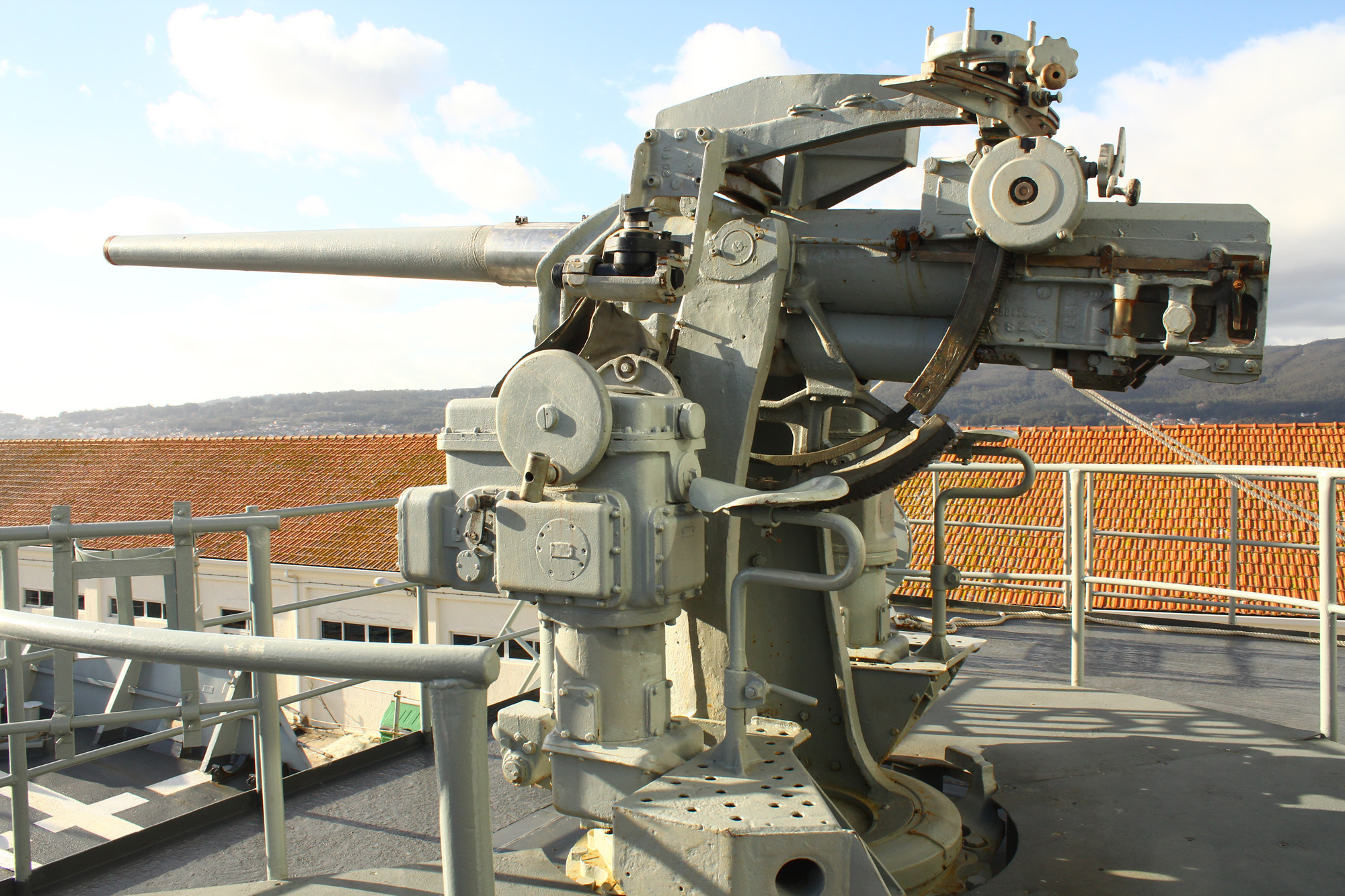
Single Mark 22 aboard Atalaya.

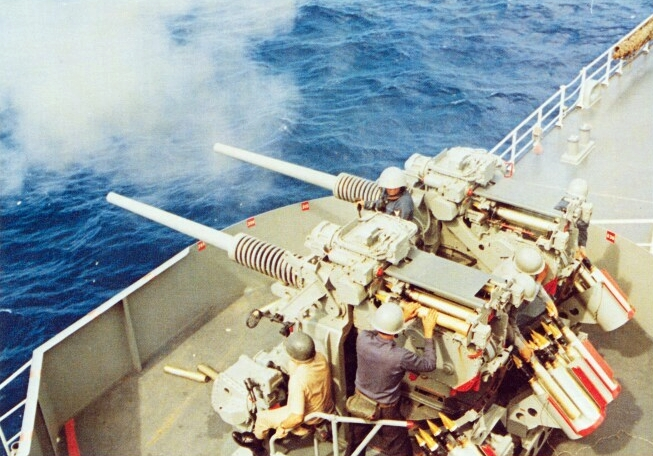
Twin Mark 33 aboard USS Austin.

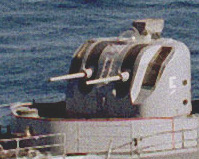
Enclosed twin Mark 33 Mod. 13 aboard USS Bronstein.
