= Chilreu-class patrol boat =

Class of Spanish Navy patrol boats

Class overview
- Name: Chilreu class
- Builders: NAVANTIA
- Operators: Spanish Navy
- Completed: 4
- Active: 3

General characteristics
- Type: Patrol boat
- Displacement: 1918 tons

The Chilreu-class patrol boats are a series of patrol boats of the Spanish Navy.

== Ships ==
Pennant	Name	Launched	Commissioned	Status	Image
P-61	Chilreu	2 May 1988	30 March 1992	Decommissioned 29 June 2012	
P-62	Alborán	20 February 1993	1 August 1997	In service	
P-63	Arnomendi	January 2000	13 December 2000	In service	
P-64	Tarifa	11 November 2003		In service	
