= Spanish patrol boat Tarifa =

Patrol boat of the Spanish Navy

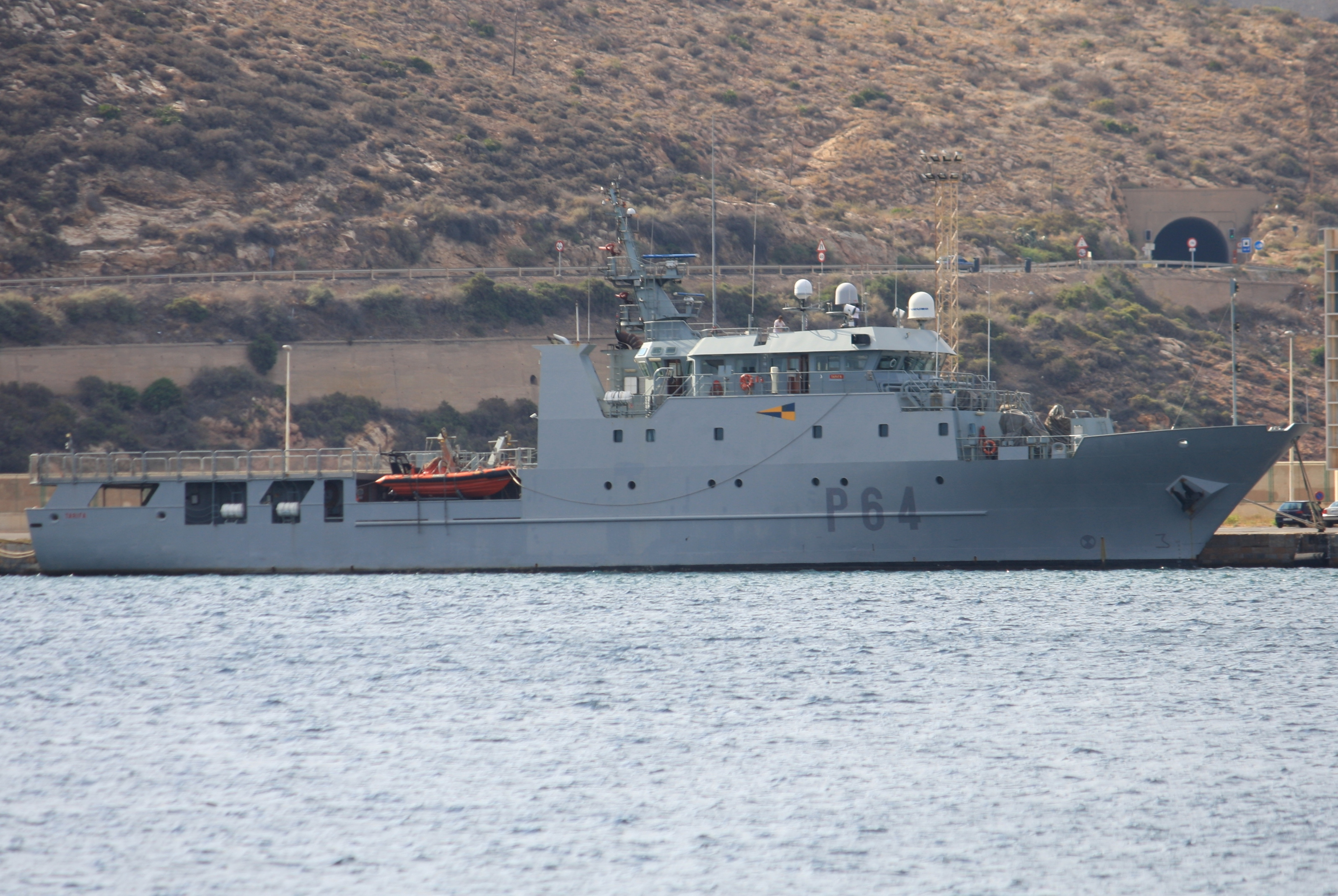

History

Spain
- Name: Tarifa
- Namesake: Tarifa
- Launched: 11 November 2003
- Identification: Hull number: P-64
- Status: In service

General characteristics
- Class & type: Chilreu-class patrol boat
- Displacement: 1,976 t (1,945 long tons)
- Length: 68.3 m (224 ft 1 in)
- Beam: 11 m (36 ft 1 in)
- Propulsion: 2,400 kW (3,200 hp) diesel engine
- Crew: 37
- Sensors & processing systems: Furuno FAR-2825; Furuno FAR-2135
- Armament: 2 × Browning M2 12.7 mm (0.50 in) machine guns
- Aircraft carried: 1 × helicopter
- Aviation facilities: Flight deck

Tarifa (P-64) is a Chilreu-class patrol boat of the Spanish Navy built in 2003. Named for the coastal town of Tarifa and the nearby Isla de Las Palomas, its primary mission is enforcing fishery regulations for the Spanish fishing fleet. The ship has a home port at the Cartagena Naval Base and is in the Maritime Action Force.

== Description ==
Tarifa has a displacement of 1,976 metric tons (1,945 long tons), a length of 68.3 meters (224 ft 1 in), and a beam of 11 meters (36 ft 1 in). The ship is powered by a 2,400-kilowatt (3,200 hp) diesel engine, two 400 kW auxiliary engines, and a 200 kW emergency generator; it has a single variable-pitch propeller and one 317 kW (425 hp) bow thruster. It has a crew of 37 people.

Arnomendi is armed with two Browning M2 12.7-millimeter (0.50 in) and one MG 42 7.62 mm (0.30 in) machine guns. It has a flight deck certified for certain Spanish Navy and Secretaría General de Pesca helicopters, and carries two Zodiac Hurricane inflatable boats. The ship is equipped with Furuno FAR-2825 and FAR-2135 navigation radars. It also has equipment to clean fishing waste and oil spills; this includes two hydraulic pumps and two cranes.

== Mission ==
The primary mission of Tarifa is to monitor maritime fishing and enforce regulations. It helps to support the Ministry of Agriculture's presence in Spanish fishing grounds, and ensures compliance with national and international fishing regulations. Additionally, the ship is capable of search and rescue operations, medical and diving support, special operations missions, and pollution cleanup.

== History ==
Tarifa was built in Vigo and was launched on 11 November 2003. On 17 May 2009, the patrol boat entered the territorial waters of Gibraltar and deployed one of its zodiac boats to visit a Spanish fishing vessel. This was the first recorded instance of a Spanish vessel conducting operational tasks in Gibraltar territorial waters. It was intercepted by a boat from the Gibraltar Squadron and left the area after some time.

The ship participated in an international campaign with the North East Atlantic Fisheries Commission from May to June 2013. The ship's focus was on protecting rose fish in the Irminger Sea, and it made a port call in Reykjavik at the midpoint of the mission. In 2016, Tarifa participated in an international pelagic monitoring campaign with Ireland, the United Kingdom, France and Spain off the coast of Ireland. During the mission, it assisted in controlling fishing of monkfish, hake, and megrim.
