= Spanish patrol boat Arnomendi =

Patrol boat of the Spanish Navy

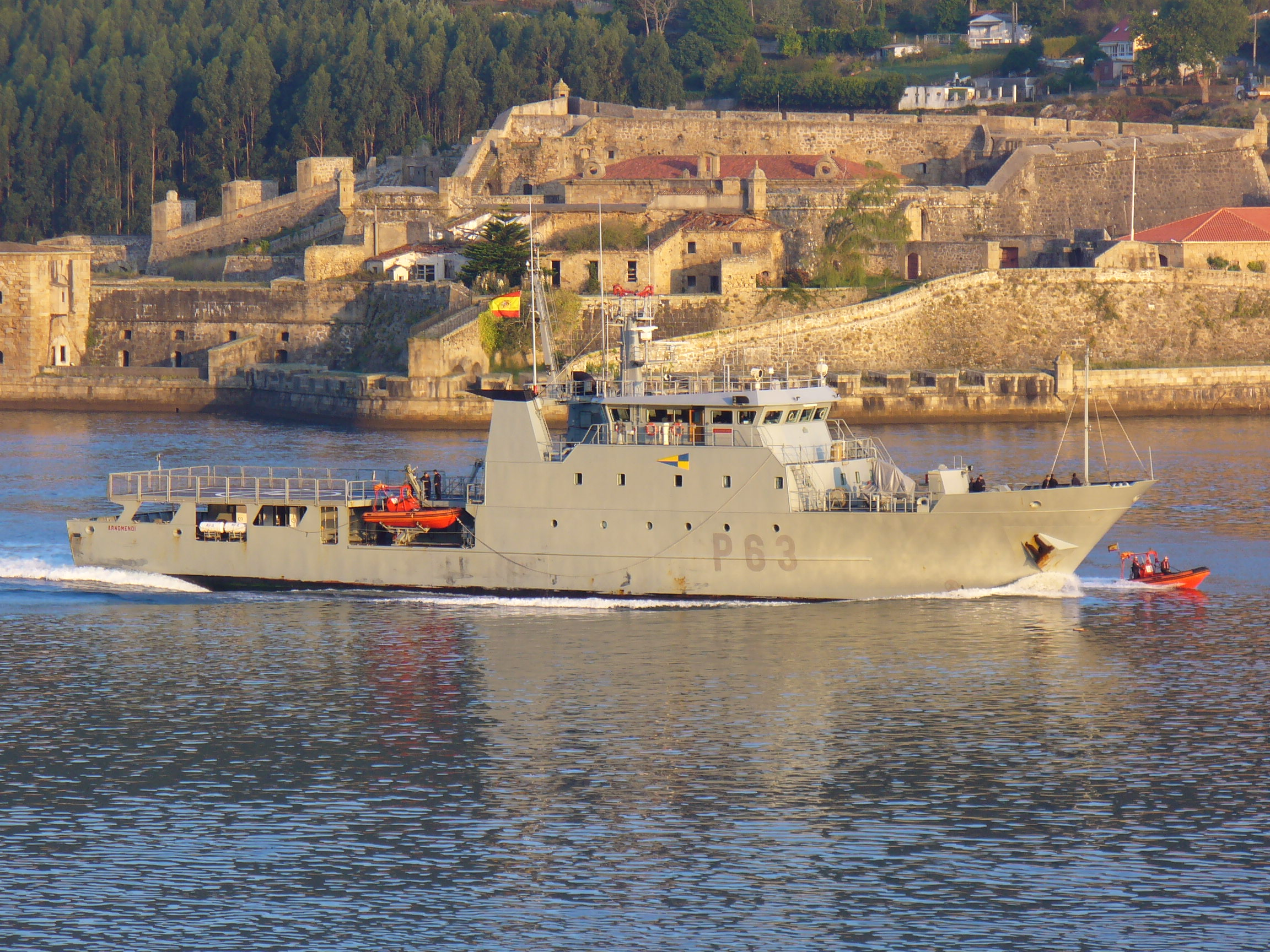

History

Spain
- Name: Arnomendi
- Namesake: Arnomendi mountain
- Launched: January 2000
- Identification: Hull number: P-63
- Status: In service

General characteristics
- Class & type: Chilreu-class patrol boat
- Displacement: 1,928 t (1,898 long tons)
- Length: 66.5 m (218 ft 2 in)
- Beam: 11 m (36 ft 1 in)
- Propulsion: 2400 KW diesel engine
- Crew: 38
- Sensors & processing systems: Furuno FAR-2825; Furuno FR-2130S
- Armament: 2 × Browning M2 12.7 mm (0.50 in) machine guns
- Aircraft carried: 1 × helicopter
- Aviation facilities: Flight deck

Arnomendi (P-63) is a Chilreu-class patrol boat of the Spanish Navy built in 2000. Named for the coastal Arnomendi mountain in Gipuzkoa, its primary mission is enforcing fishery regulations for the Spanish fishing fleet. The ship has a home port at the Ferrol Naval Base and is in the Maritime Action Force.

== Description ==
Arnomendi has a displacement of 1,928 metric tons (1,898 long tons), a length of 66.5 meters (218 ft 2 in), and a beam of 11 meters (36 ft 1 in). The ship is powered by a 2,400 kilowatt diesel engine and two 350 KW auxiliary engines; it has a single variable-pitch propeller and one 325 kilowatt bow thruster. It has a crew of 38 people.

Arnomendi is armed with two Browning M2 12.7-millimeter (0.50 in) and one MG 42 7.62 mm (0.30 in) machine guns. It has a flight deck certified for certain Navy and Secretaría General de Pesca helicopters, and carries two zodiac inflatable boats. The ship is equipped with Furuno FAR-2825 and FAR-2130S navigation radars, and has a cargo capacity of 321 cubic meters serviced by a single hydraulic loading crane. It also has equipment to provide emergency assistance to fishing vessels, as well as an emergency operating room for rescued mariners.

== Mission ==
The primary mission of Arnomendi is to monitor and enforce maritime fishing. It helps to support the Ministry of Agriculture's presence in Spanish fishing grounds, and ensures compliance with national and international fishing regulations. Additionally, the ship is capable of search and rescue operations, forward naval presence, special operations missions, and scientific research. The carried zodiac boats allow for assistance at sea, medical evacuations, and vessel boarding and inspection.

== History ==
Arnomendi is the third vessel in the Chilreu-class of patrol boats. It was constructed in the Vigo Shipyard of Pontevedra and was launched in January 2000. The Minister of Agriculture Ana Loyola de Palacio was the ship's sponsor. It entered service and was commission on 13 December 2000. The ship was originally intended to be named Alegranza, after the uninhabited Alegranza island, but the name was ultimately changed to Arnomendi for a mountain in Gipuzkoa along Spain's northern coast. Arnomendi was first based at Las Palmas, moved to Cartagena in 2010, and then to Ferrol in 2016.

The ship has carried out missions in Spanish fisheries in the Canary Islands and off Cádiz, and more recently in the Cantabrian Sea. In these deployments, it supported the Spanish northern bonito fishing fleet and bluefin tuna fishing fleet. One such deployment took place in 2020, supporting the "Costera del Bonito del Norte 2020" maritime campaign to surveil and protect a bonito fishing fleet in the Northern Atlantic. As of 2023, it had completed a total of eight campaigns in the international waters regulated by the Northwest Atlantic Fisheries Organization and seven in those of the North East Atlantic Fisheries Commission.

On 23 April 2014, British Gibraltar news reported that Arnomendi made a brief incursion into Gibraltar territorial waters and was challenged by HMS Scimitar. The incursion lasted roughly an hour before Arnomendi returned to international waters in the Strait of Gibraltar, and the incident caused the British Foreign Office to file a complaint with Spain.

In October 2015, Arnomendi participated in an international pelagic monitoring campaign with Ireland, the United Kingdom, France and Spain off the coast of Ireland.
