= Exclusive economic zone of Spain =

Economic zone exclusive to Spain

Spain's exclusive economic zone (EEZ) (Spanish: Zona económica exclusiva de España) is the 30th largest in the world with 1,039,233 km^{2} (401,250 sq mi). It is mostly in the Atlantic Ocean and the Mediterranean Sea. This is approximately double the entire Spanish land area. Together the land and sea surface would account for approximately 0.3% of the world's land surface.

== Geography ==
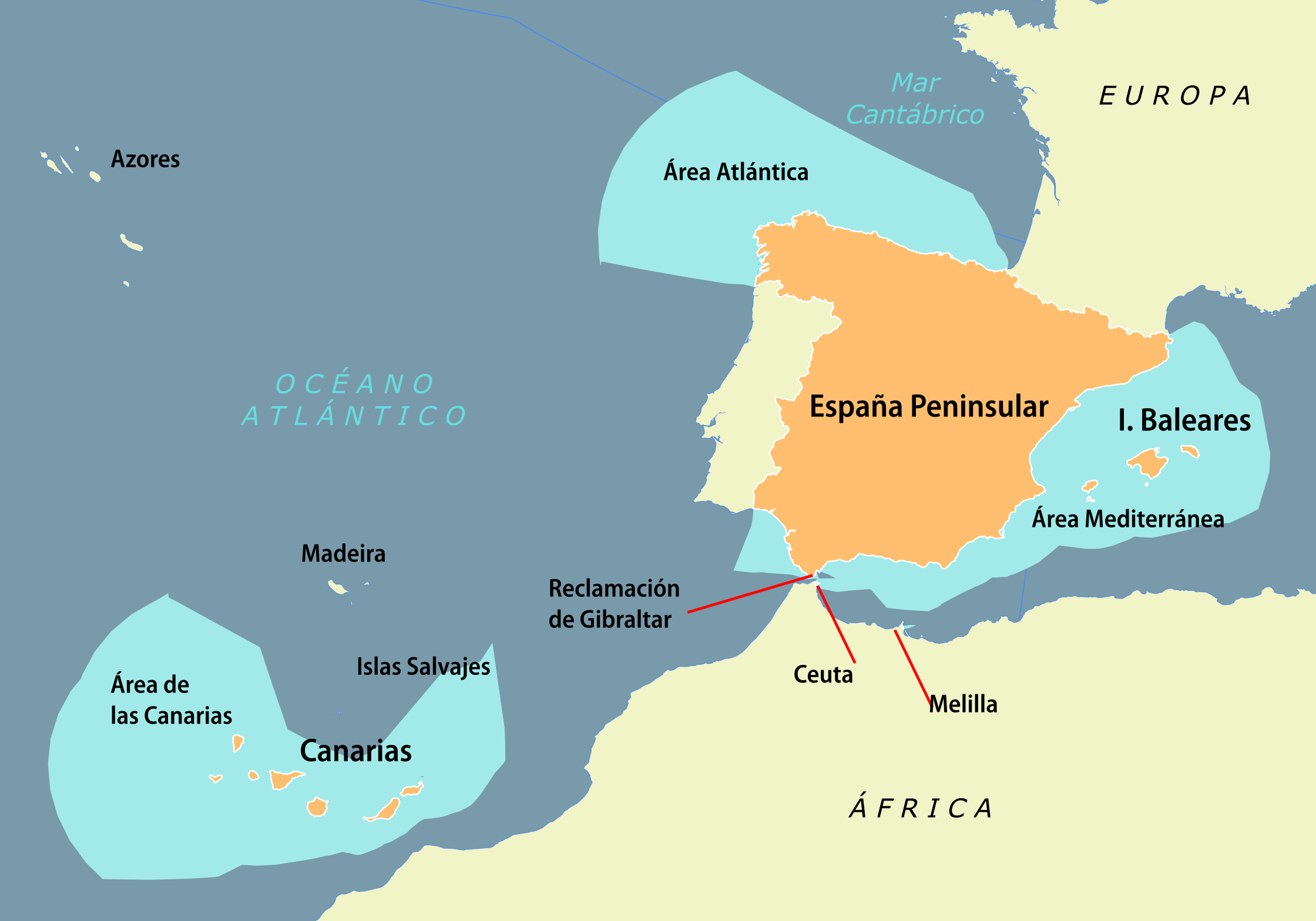
Spain's exclusive economic zone

The Spanish EEZ is divided into three compact regions: the Cantabrian and Atlantic regions (Área Atlántica), the Mediterranean together with the Gulf of Cádiz region (Área mediterránea junto) and the dependent area of the Canary Islands (Áreas de las Canarias). It is located in the Mediterranean Sea (Balearic Sea, Alboran Sea) and the Atlantic Ocean (Bay of Biscay). The most notable areas are the Canary Islands, the Balearic Islands and the north western area in the Bay of Biscay.

== Disputes ==
=== Active ===
==== Algeria ====
Algeria on 17 April 2018 establishes an exclusive economic zone (EEZ) off its coasts by Presidential Decree No. 18-96 of 2 Rajab 1439 corresponding to 20 March 2018. The permanent Mission of Spain to the United Nations on 27 July 2018 declares his disagreement with the EEZ announced by Algeria and that the Government of Spain hereby indicates its willingness to enter into negotiations with the Government of Algeria with a view to reaching a mutually acceptable agreement on the outer limits of their respective exclusive economic zones, The same was done by the Italian mission on 28 November 2018. The two countries indicated that the Algerian measure had been taken unilaterally and without consulting them.

25 November 2018 The Algerian Ministry of Foreign Affairs sent an oral note in response to the Spanish protest, explains that the Algerian Government does not recognize the largely exorbitant coordinates contained in Royal Decree 236/2013, which overlap with the coordinates of Presidential Decree n° 18–96 establishing an exclusive economic zone off the coast of Algeria. The Algerian Government wishes to emphasize that the unilateral delimitation carried out by Spain is not in conformity with the letter of the United Nations Convention on the Law of the Sea and has not taken into consideration the configuration, the specific characteristics and the special circumstances of the Mediterranean Sea, in particular for the case of the two countries whose coasts are located face to face, as well as the objective rules and relevant principles of international law to govern the equitable delimitation of the maritime areas between Algeria and Spain, in accordance with article 74 of the United Nations Convention on the Law of the Sea. Algeria expressed its willingness to negotiate for a just solution

20 June 2019 a communication from Algeria addressed to the Italian embassy and the Spain embassy in Algiers to show their eligibility in her exclusive economic zone.

==== Portugal ====
Spain formerly disputed the EEZ's southern border, maintaining that it should be drawn halfway between Madeira and the Canary Islands. But Portugal exercises sovereignty over the Savage Islands, a small archipelago north of the Canaries, claiming an EEZ border further south. Spain objected, arguing that the Savage Islands do not have a separate continental shelf, citing article 121 of the United Nations Convention on the Law of the Sea. Spain no longer disputes the Portuguese claim since 2015.

==== United Kingdom ====
The Treaty of Utrecht would only give the British jurisdiction over the internal waters of the port The British overseas territory of Gibraltar, this treaty between these two countries is disputed by United Kingdom arguing that Gibraltar has jurisdiction over its territorial waters. This discussion would lead both parties to a diplomatic conflict that returned after a fishing dispute in 2013.

== See also ==
- Geography of Spain
- Exclusive economic zone of France
- Exclusive economic zone of Portugal
