= Ferrol Naval Base =

Military base and arsenal of the Spanish Navy in Ferrol, Spain

Coordinates: 43°28′47″N 8°14′14″W

- Arsenal de Ferrol
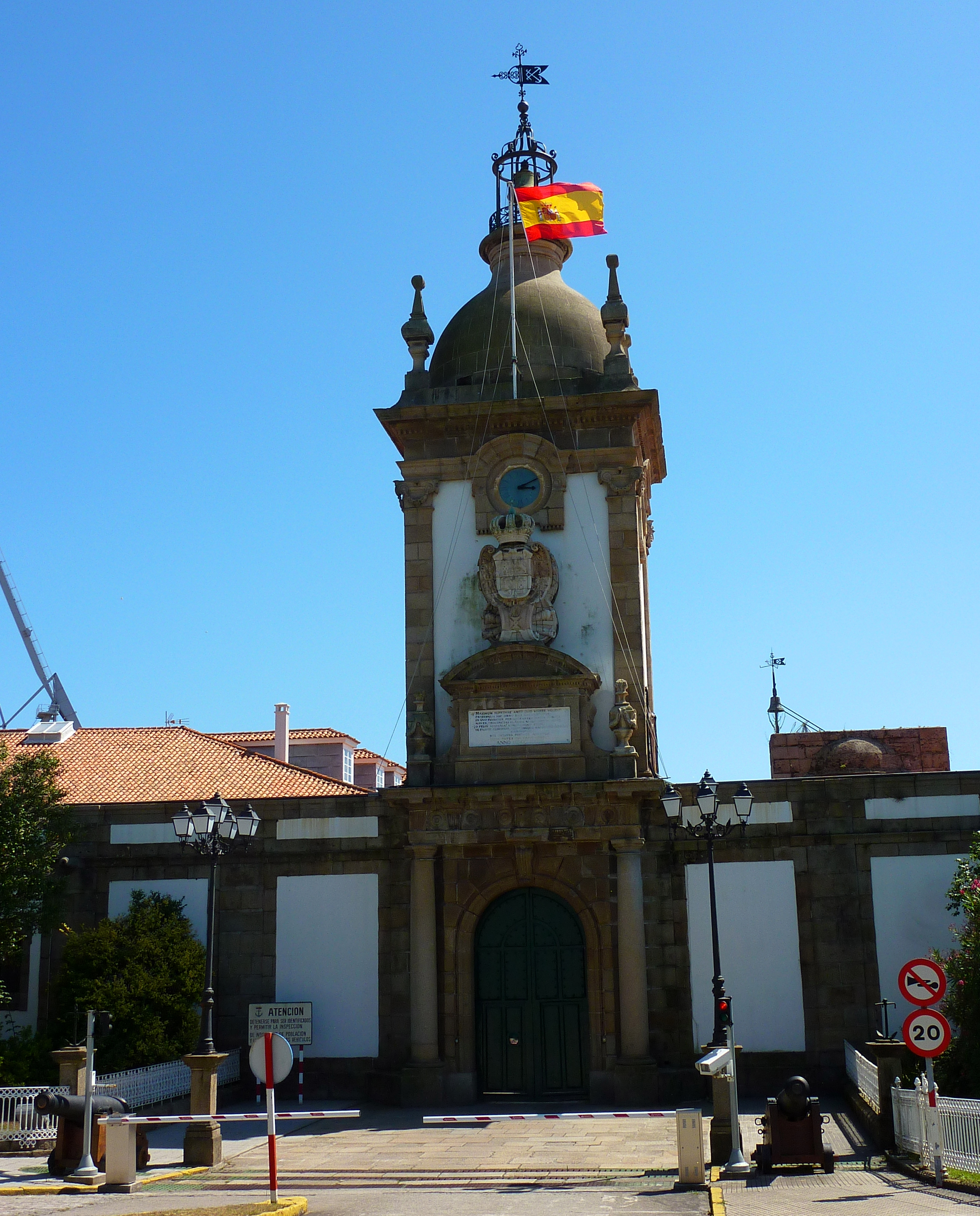

Site information
- Type: Military base
- Owner: Spain
- Controlled by: Spanish Navy

Site history
- Built: 16th century 1740–1790
- In use: 1726–present

Garrison information
- Current commander: Vice admiral Antonio Duelo Menor
- Occupants: See Ships

Ferrol Naval Base, also known as the Arsenal of Ferrol, is a military base and arsenal of the Spanish Navy located in Ferrol, Spain. It is the main Spanish naval base on the Atlantic.

== History ==
The first warships arrived in the Ría de Ferrol in the 16th century, during the reign of the House of Austria. It was not until 1724 when Felipe V, of the House of Bourbon, established Ferrol as the main port of the Atlantic.

Major development and expansion of the shipyards and arsenal began in the 1740s and 1750s. Initial proposals were drawn up under Minister of the Navy José Patiño, and executed by his successor, Zenón de Somodevilla y Bengoechea, Marquis de la Ensenadahe, appointed Minister of the Navy in 1743. The first ship, the San Fernando, was launched in 1751. By then twelve ships could be being built simultaneously. King Charles III was particularly interested in the navy, and in 1790, during his reign, the arsenal at Ferrol was largely completed, with a workforce of 5,440 men and a capacity to maintain 70 ships.

Technological developments during the Industrial Revolution led to the establishment of the School of Machinists and the School of Naval Engineers in 1850, during the reign of Isabel II. A steam engine workshop was also established. At the beginning of the 20th century, the first Spanish battleships, the España class, were built in Ferrol. By 1912 the shipyards of Ferrol were primarily building battleships and cruisers, while destroyers and submarines were built in Cartagena.

The Ferrol naval base was substantially modernized during the twentieth century. The Marine Infantry Barracks were built; as were the Electricity and Electronics Workshop and new warehouses. New facilities for docks 1 and 2 were constructed, as was a Cannon Workshop. The docks have been expanded, and vessels can be moored around the basin. In 2003 dock 5 was enlarged to fit the Álvaro de Bazán-class frigates. In 2013 the Naval Archive of Ferrol was inaugurated.

== Ships ==
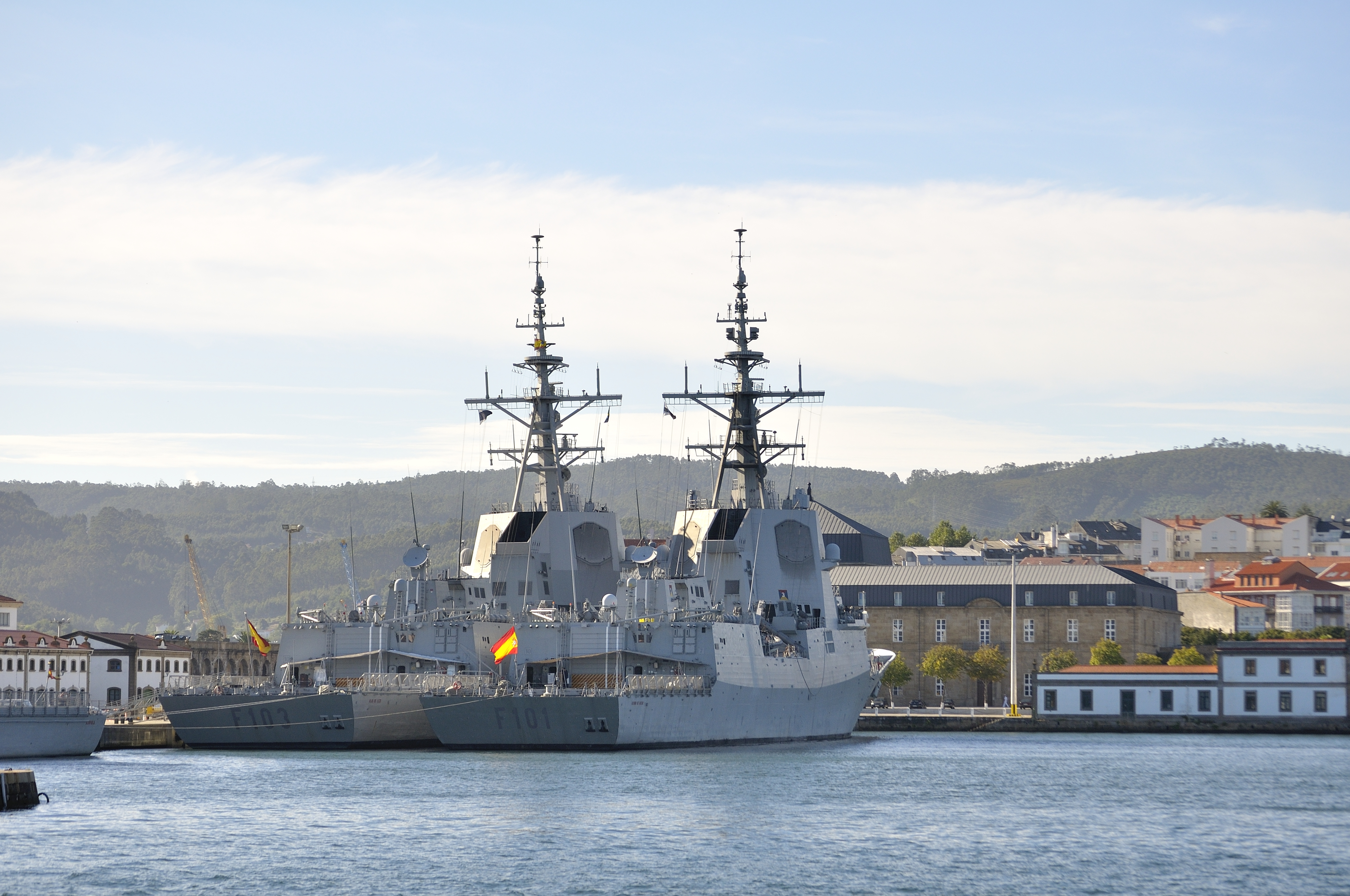
Frigates Blas de Lezo and Álvaro de Bazán at Ferrol

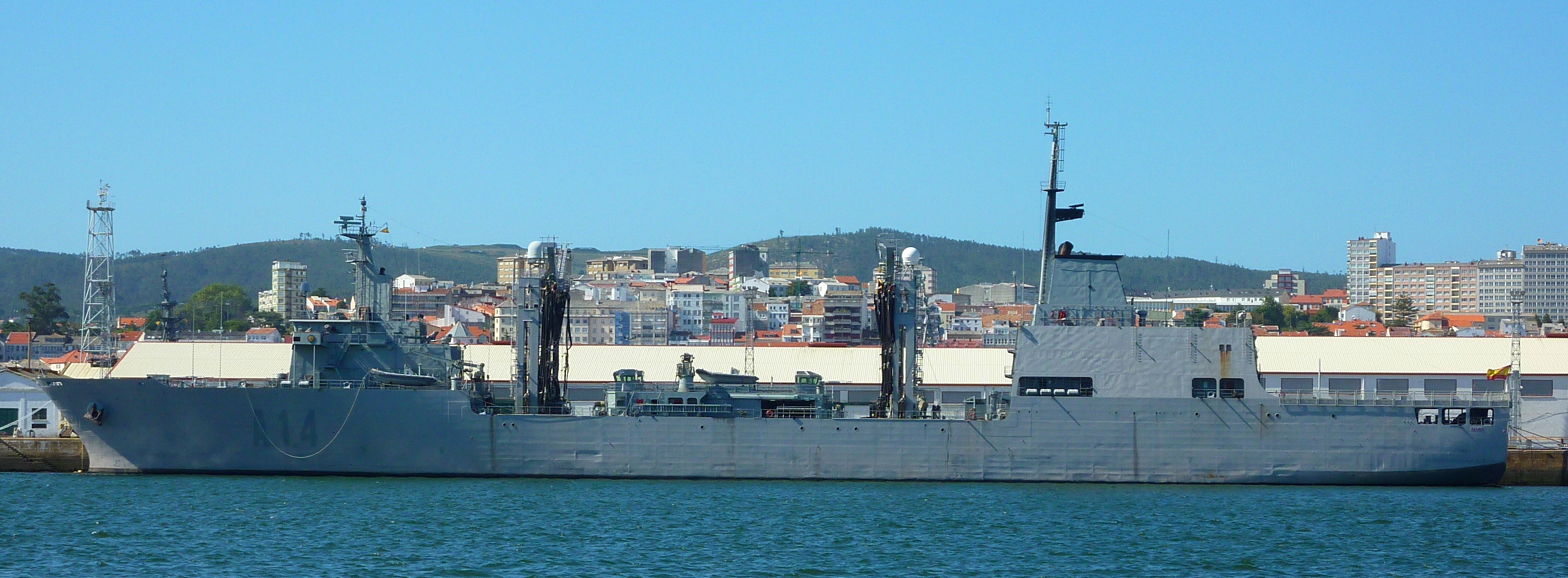
Patiño at Ferrol

- Álvaro de Bazán-class frigates
  - Álvaro de Bazán
  - Almirante Juan de Borbón
  - Blas de Lezo
  - Méndez Núñez
  - Cristóbal Colón
- Serviola-class patrol boats
  - Serviola
  - Centinela
  - Vigía
  - Atalaya
- Replenishment oilers
  - Patiño
  - Cantabria
- Patrol ships
  - Cabo Fradera

== See also ==
- List of ships built at Ferrol shipyards 1750 – 1881
- Rota Naval Base
- Las Palmas Naval Base
- Cartagena Naval Base
