= Spanish frigate Méndez Núñez =

Spanish Navy frigate commissioned in 2006

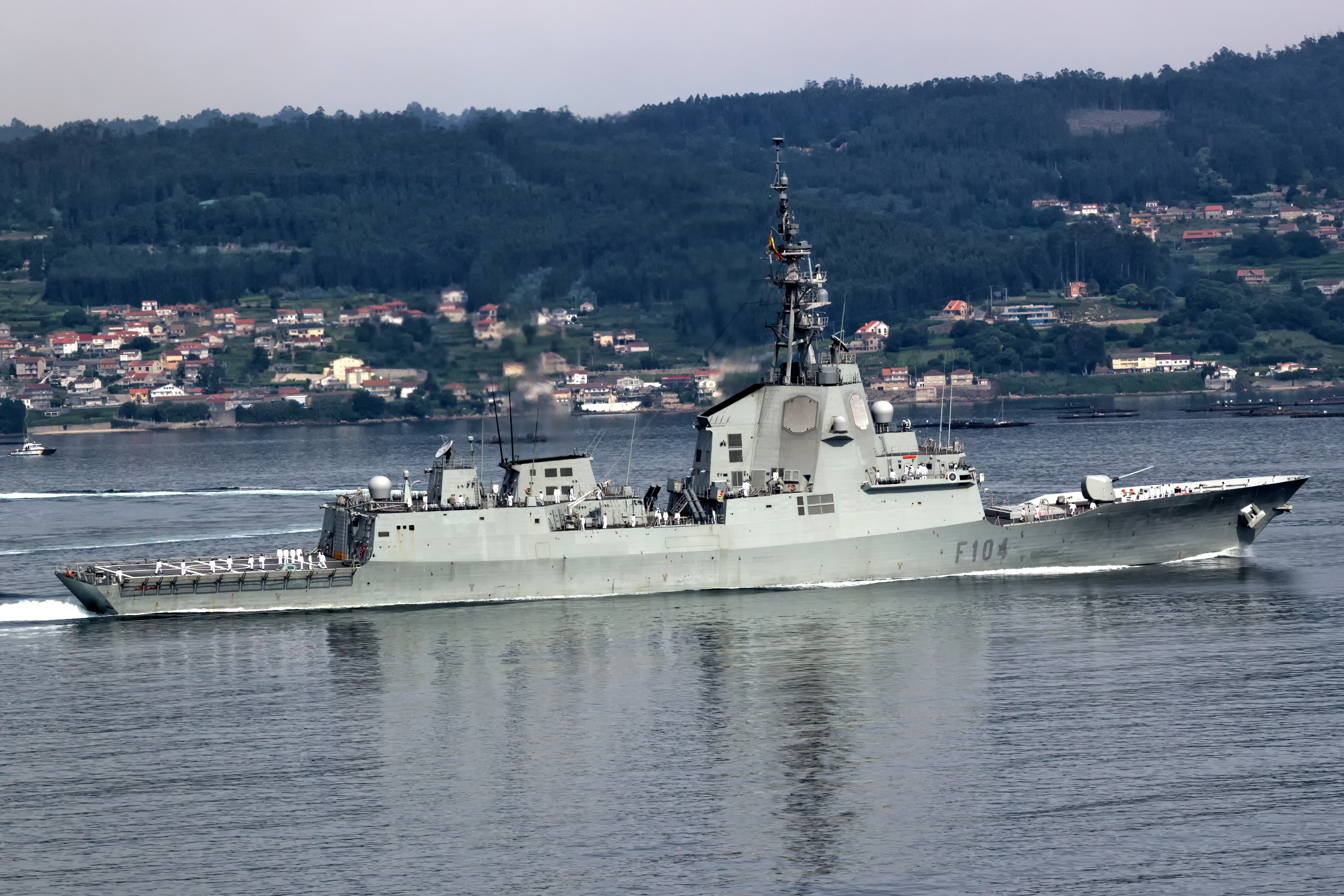
- Méndez Núñez (F-104) at a naval review in 2017.

History

Spain
- Name: Méndez Núñez
- Namesake: Casto Méndez Núñez
- Ordered: 31 January 1997
- Builder: Navantia
- Cost: $600 million
- Laid down: 16 May 2003
- Launched: 12 November 2004
- Commissioned: 21 March 2006
- Home port: Naval Base of Ferrol
- Identification: Pennant number: F-104
- Status: in active service
- Badge

General characteristics
- Class & type: Álvaro de Bazán-class frigate
- Displacement: 5,800-6,391 tonnes
- Length: 146.7 m (481 ft)
- Beam: 18.6 m (61 ft)
- Draft: 8.5 m (28 ft)
- Propulsion: CODOG; 2 × General Electric LM2500 gas turbines; 2 × Navantia Caterpillar 3600 diesel engines
- Speed: 28.5 knots (52.8 km/h; 32.8 mph)
- Range: 4,500 nmi (8,300 km; 5,200 mi) at 18 knots (33 km/h; 21 mph)
- Complement: 250 (48 officers)
- Sensors & processing systems: Lockheed Martin AN/SPY-1D 3-D multifunction radar; Raytheon SPS-67(V)4 surface search radar; Raytheon DE1160 LF active and passive sonar; 2 × ARIES navigation/surface radar; 2 × Raytheon SPG-62 Mk99 radar illuminator
- Electronic warfare & decoys: 4 × FMC SRBOC Mk36 flare launchers; SLQ-25A Enhanced Nixie torpedo countermeasures; Indra SLQ-380 EW suite; Indra Mk 9500 interceptor
- Armament: 1 × 5-inch/54 Mk45 Mod 2 gun; Provision for one CIWS FABA 20mm/120 Meroka system.; 1 × 48 cell Mk 41 vertical launch systems consisting of: - 32 × Standard SM-2MR Block IIIA; - 16 × 4 × RIM-162 Evolved Sea Sparrow Missile (64); 8 × McDonnell Douglas RGM-84 Harpoon anti-ship missile; 4 × 324 mm Mk32 Mod 9 double Torpedo launchers with 12 Honeywell Mk46 mod 5 Torpedo
- Aircraft carried: 1 × Sikorsky SH-60B LAMPS III Seahawk

Méndez Núñez (F-104) is an Álvaro de Bazán-class frigate of the Spanish Navy. She is the fourth ship of her class, entering service in 2006. She is named after the 19th-century Spanish Rear admiral Casto Méndez Núñez. It was the first Spanish Navy vessel to visit the Philippines since the end of the Southeast Asian nation's Spanish colonial-period in 1898.

== Operational history ==
Méndez Núñez was ordered along with four other ships of the class on 31 January 1997. A fifth ship, F105, which became Cristóbal Colón, was ordered in 2005. Construction started on 16 May 2003 and she was launched on 12 November 2004. She was delivered to the Spanish Navy on 21 March 2006.

While taking part in FTM-12 exercise on 22 June 2007 in Hawaiian waters, Méndez Núñez became the Spanish Navy's first ship to detect and track a ballistic missile.

On 21 April 2008, while part of the Royal Navy's HMS Illustrious Combat Group in the Red Sea, Méndez Núñez was ordered to move to Somalia's coast in support of the tuna vessel Playa de Bakio, which had been seized by Somali pirates. After the tuna boat was released, pirates attempted to seize it again, but the frigate's helicopter and zodiacs manoeuvred to prevent it. In March 2009, she participated in the NATO exercise Loyal Mariner, in the waters of southern Sardinia, along with other Spanish ships.

On 11 September 2009 Méndez Núñez, her sister ship Álvaro de Bazán, and the Santa María-class Navarra, and their respective air units, carried out exercises with the students of the Naval School in the estuary of Pontevedra.

At the end of October 2009, after completing a deployment in NATO's Operation Active Endeavour in the Eastern Mediterranean, she relieved Canarias in Operation Atalanta to combat piracy in Somali waters, to enable the Canarias to carry out maintenance and replenishment. During the liberation of the Spanish fishing ship Alakrana, the helicopters of the frigates Canarias and Méndez Núñez, tried without success to capture the last pirates that left the ship.

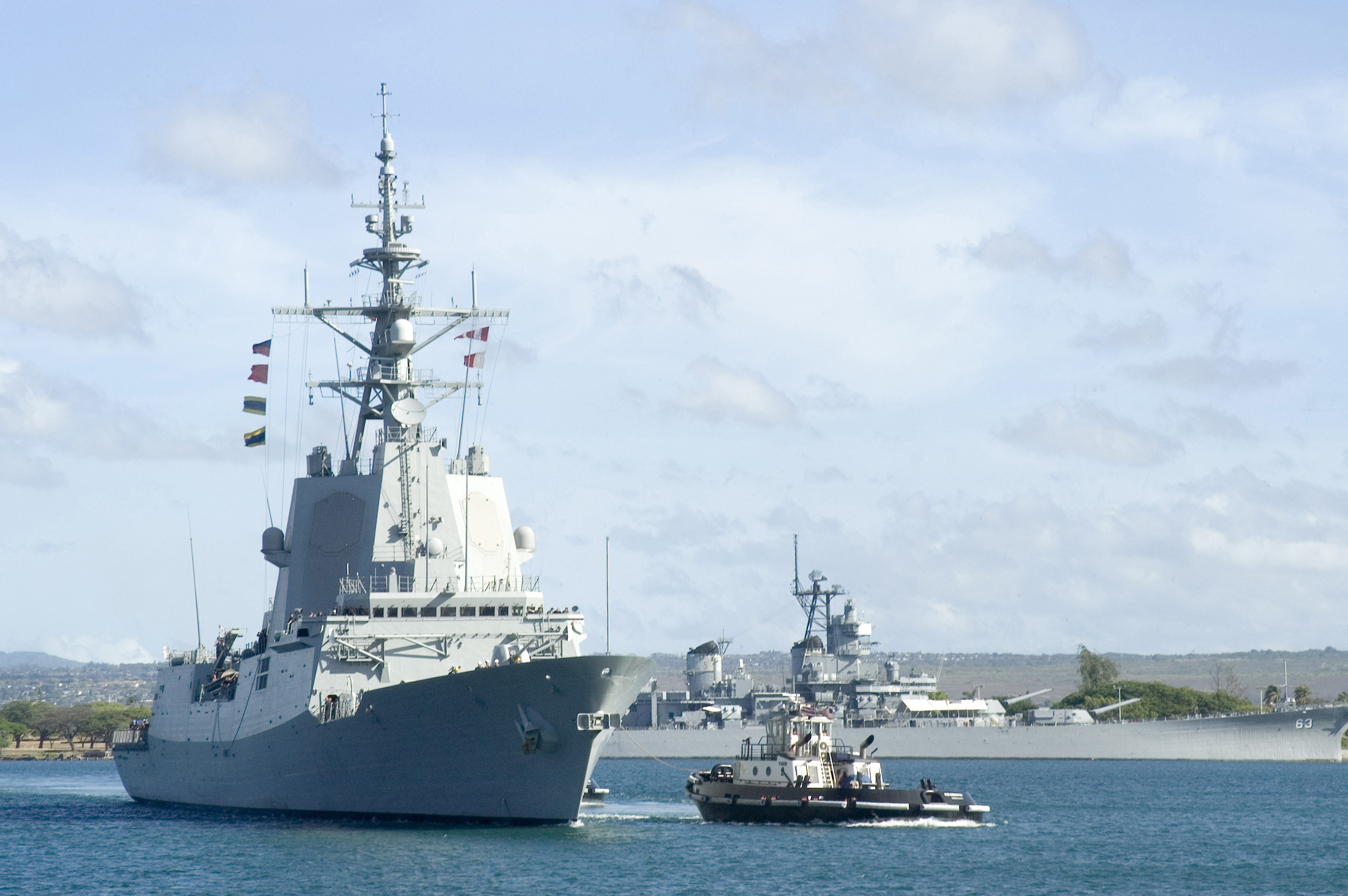
Méndez Núñez in Pearl Harbor, Hawaii

Between 21 and 30 June 2010 Méndez Núñez and the Spanish oiler Patiño took part in Exercise Swordfish in Portuguese waters, together with units from Portugal, Italy and France.

On 18 July 2010 Méndez Núñez received a flag of combat from the Infanta Elena while docked in the Port of Vigo. Later that day Méndez Núñez participated in the exhibition A safe maritime environment for the XXI century held in Vigo next to the vessels Galicia, Juan Sebastián Elcano and Chilreu.

On 19 March 2011 the Government of Spain announced that Méndez Núñez would be part of the force sent to intervene in the Libyan Civil War, as part of United Nations Security Council Resolution 1973. The ship returned to her base on 29 June 2011 after 101 days, in which she inspected 22 ships of different types.

Between 20 and 22 February 2012, Méndez Núñez participated in the national air defense exercise Sirio-12, which took place south of the Balearic Islands and in the Alboran Sea. Between 2 and 5 July 2012, the frigates Álvaro de Bazán and Almirante Juan de Borbón, the logistics supply vessel Cantabria, the submarine Galerna and AV-8B aircraft of the 9th Navy squadron participated in the MAR-22 exercise on the Atlantic coast of Galicia.

On 23 November 2012, Méndez Núñez sailed to Somalia, where on 6 December, she relieved Castilla in Operation Atalanta the anti-piracy operation off Somalia. Castilla had been the flagship of the operation. On 19 December, Méndez Núñez and another coalition vessel completed their second mission escorting a ship of the World Food Programme and managed to prevented the hijacking of the North Korean ship Dae San. On 19 February 2013, Méndez Núñez and the Dutch frigate HNLMS De Ruyter took part in the arrest of nine pirates.

On 9 March, Méndez Núñez assisted the tanker Royal Grace, which was released after being hijacked on 11 May 2012. After receiving assistance from Méndez Núñez, the Royal Grace continued her voyage escorted by the Spanish patrol ship Rayo, bound for the port of Salalah in Oman.

Méndez Núñez returned to Ferrol Naval Base on 11 July 2014. Her arrival coincided with the other four ships of her class being present in Ferrol. The five frigates of the class made a joint training exercise for first time as part of the 31st Escort Squadron of which they are part.

In September 2014 Méndez Núñez and Álvaro de Bazán took part in Air Force exercise DACEX-14 (Canary Air Defense). In mid-October Méndez Núñez participated in NATO exercise Noble Mariner-14 in the waters off Cartagena, along with 24 other surface vessels and 6 submarines from sixteen countries. On 6 April 2015 she sailed from her base in Ferrol to participate in Scottish waters in the NATO Exercise Joint Warrior, after which she visited the port of London before returning to her base.

At the beginning of June, Méndez Núñez was incorporated into Standing NATO Maritime Group 1 as a command vessel, relieving Álvaro de Bazán. In the course of this deployment, the frigate participated in the Northern Coasts 16 exercises in Baltic waters, involving 38 vessels from eight countries. She returned to Ferrol after being relieved by the Álvaro de Bazán on 30 September 2016.

On 2 February 2017, the Méndez Núñez and the oiler Patiño joined Standing NATO Maritime Group 1. This deployment ended on 12 May 2017.

In April 2019, Méndez Núñez was deployed with U.S. Navy Carrier Strike Group-12 for seven months. However, as of May 2019, the frigate has been recalled from this joint deployment.

On 5 September 2019, Méndez Núñez made the historic port-visit to the Philippines, making it the 1st Spanish Navy vessel to do so, since the Battle of Manila Bay during the Spanish–American War in 1898. In 2025, the frigate joined the Royal Navy's carrier strike group as part of Operation HIGHMAST in a deployment to the Indo-Pacific region.
