= Álvaro de Bazán (disambiguation) =

Álvaro de Bazán may refer to:

- Álvaro de Bazán the Elder, a Spanish admiral and father of the 1st Marquis of Santa Cruz
- Álvaro de Bazán, 1st Marquis of Santa Cruz, a Spanish admiral of the 16th century and father of the 2nd Marquis of Santa Cruz
- Álvaro de Bazán, 2nd Marquis of Santa Cruz, a Spanish admiral of the 17th century
- Álvaro de Bazán-class gunboat, a class of gunboats operated by the Spanish Navy
- Spanish gunboat Álvaro de Bazán, lead ship of the Álvaro de Bazán class gunboats
- Álvaro de Bazán-class frigate, a five-ship class of air defence frigates currently operated by the Spanish Navy
- Spanish frigate Álvaro de Bazán (F101), lead ship of the Álvaro de Bazán-class frigates
