= Spanish frigate Blas de Lezo =

Spanish Navy frigate commissioned in 2004

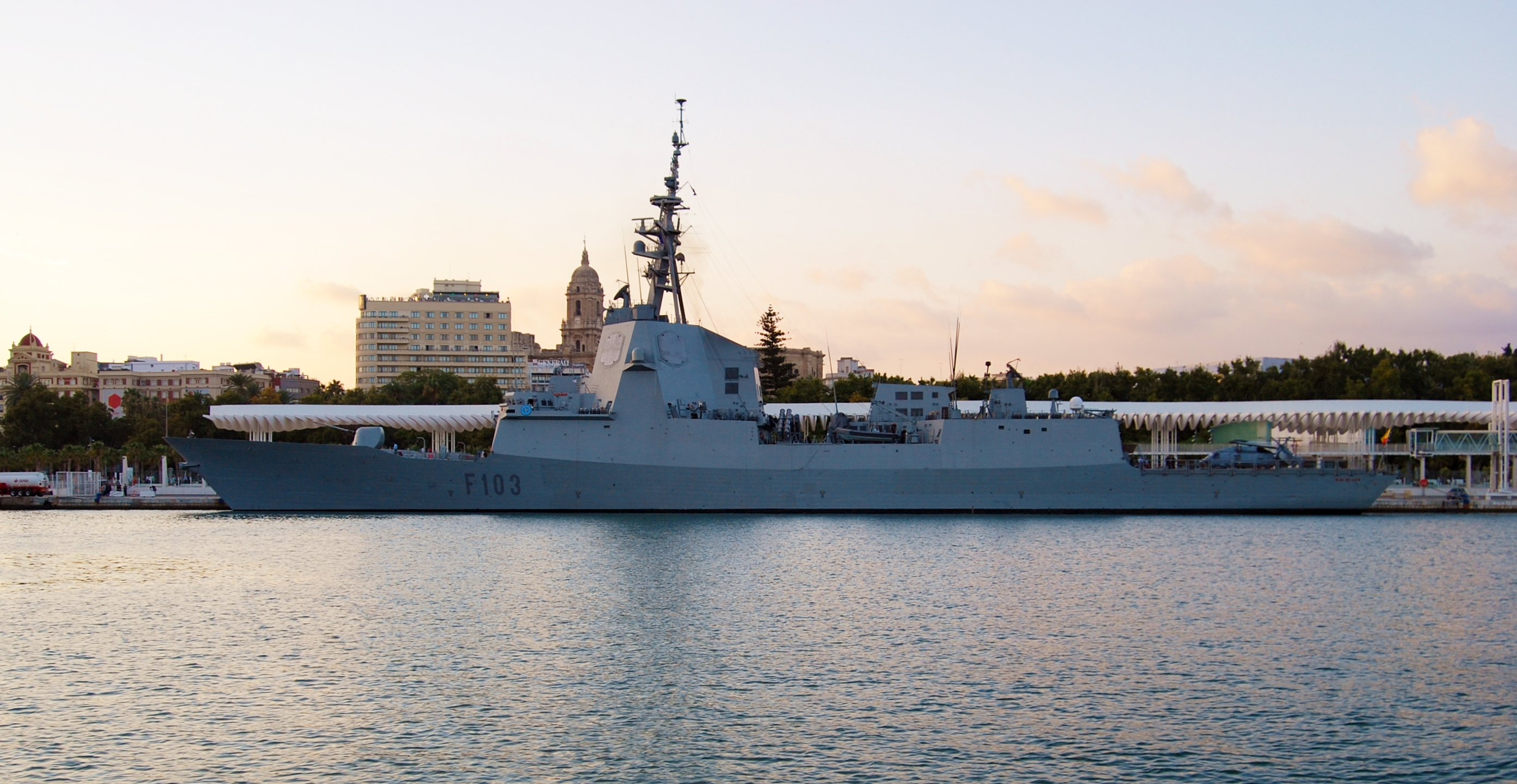
- Blas de Lezo in 2013

History

Spain
- Name: Blas de Lezo
- Namesake: Blas de Lezo
- Ordered: 31 January 1997
- Builder: Izar
- Cost: 600 million €
- Launched: 16 May 2003
- Commissioned: 16 December 2004
- Home port: Ferrol
- Identification: Pennant number: F-103; EBDB
- Status: in active service
- Badge

General characteristics
- Class & type: Álvaro de Bazán-class frigate
- Displacement: 5,800–6,391 tonnes
- Length: 146.7 m (481 ft)
- Beam: 18.6 m (61 ft)
- Draft: 4.75 m (15.6 ft)
- Propulsion: CODOG; 2 × General Electric LM2500 gas turbines; 2 × Navantia Caterpillar 3600 diesel engines
- Speed: 28.5 knots (52.8 km/h; 32.8 mph)
- Range: 4,500 nmi (8,300 km; 5,200 mi) at 18 knots (33 km/h; 21 mph)
- Complement: 250 (48 officers)
- Sensors & processing systems: Lockheed Martin AN/SPY-1D 3-D multifunction radar; Raytheon SPS-67(V)4 surface search radar; Raytheon DE1160 LF active and passive sonar; 2 × ARIES navigation/surface radar; 2 × Raytheon SPG-62 Mk99 radar illuminator
- Electronic warfare & decoys: 4 × FMC SRBOC Mk36 flare launchers; SLQ-25A Enhanced Nixie torpedo countermeasures; Indra SLQ-380 EW suite; Indra Mk 9500 interceptor
- Armament: 1 × 5-inch/54 Mk45 Mod 2 gun; Provision for one CIWS FABA 20mm/120 Meroka system.; 1 × 48 cell Mk 41 vertical launch systems; 32 × Standard SM-2MR Block IIIA; 64 × RIM-162 Evolved Sea Sparrow Missile; 8 × McDonnell Douglas RGM-84 Harpoon anti-ship missile; 4 × 324 mm Mk32 Mod 9 double Torpedo launchers with 12 Honeywell Mk46 mod 5 Torpedo
- Aircraft carried: 1 × Sikorsky SH-60B LAMPS III Seahawk

Blas de Lezo (F-103) is a Spanish Navy guided missile frigate of the Álvaro de Bazán class. This is the third ship class of air defense frigates in the Spanish Navy. It was named after the 18th century Spanish Admiral Blas de Lezo. The ship was built by Izar Shipbuilding in Ferrol, Spain and entered into service in 2004.

== Operational history ==
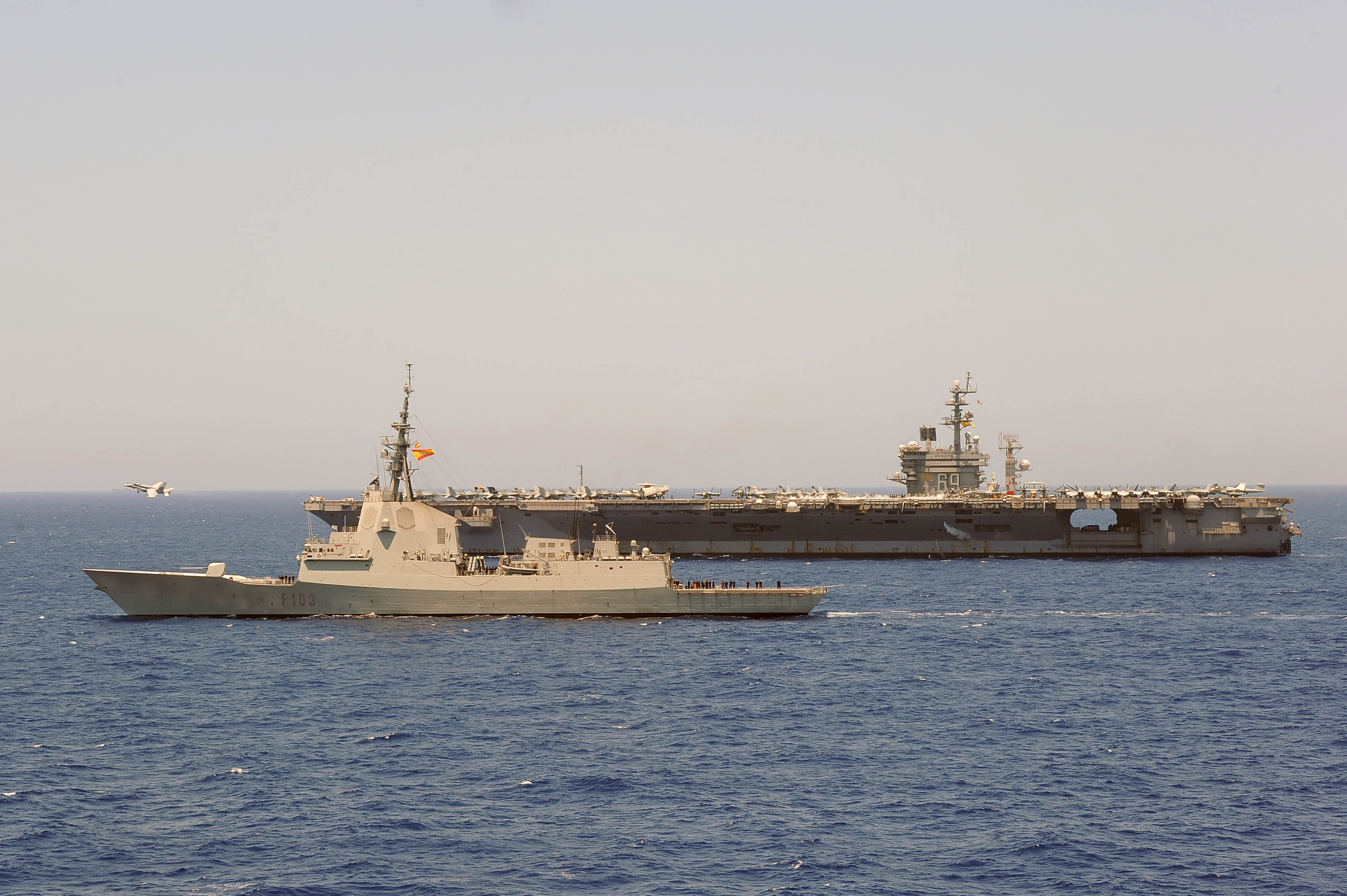
Blas de Lezo alongside the Nimitz-class aircraft carrier USS Dwight D. Eisenhower while an F/A-18 Super Hornet takes off

On 16 May 2003 Blas de Lezo was launched. This was the same day that construction of the frigate Méndez Núñez began.

From 7–11 September 2004 Blas de Lezo conducted her sea trials. On 16 December 2004 the frigate was delivered to the Spanish Navy.

In September 2005 the frigate conducted missile launching tests (CSSQT) in the United States with the American destroyers USS Howard and USS Halsey.

In 2007 Blas de Lezo joined the combat group of French nuclear aircraft carrier Charles de Gaulle for two months. She subsequently had an accident on 25 September 2007, during the NATO Neptune Warrior exercises off Scotland. There were no injuries. An emergency repair was carried out at the Navantia-Ferrol facility in Fene, Spain. Then she headed out to Denmark where she took over the command of Permanent Naval Group No. 1 of NATO (SNMG-1). In this group, she replaced Álvaro de Bazán.

From April 2009 onwards Blas de Lezo, along with other vessels of SNMG-1, participated in NATO's Allied Protector operation to combat piracy in the waters of the Gulf of Aden and the Horn of Africa. On 4 July 2009 during the course of an operation, the crew boarded two vessels suspected of piracy after receiving a warning from the Liberian merchant United Lady of a possible attack.

On 9 April 2012 she sailed from Ferrol, Spain to the east coast of the United States to integrate into Task Force 8 of the United States Navy. She was joined by the aircraft carrier USS Dwight D. Eisenhower, a Ticonderoga-class cruiser, and three Arleigh Burke-class destroyers with which she trained. Following this drill, she became part of an international group aimed at combating drug trafficking in the Caribbean Sea. On 31 May 2012 she returned to her base at Ferrol.

On 11 June 2013 Blas de Lezo sailed from the Naval Station of Rota to take command of NATO Permanent Group No. 2 (SNMG-2) based in Aksaz, Turkey, where she arrived on June 15. In the course of this deployment, she participated in Ocean Shield, an anti-piracy operation in the Indian Ocean, and Active Endeavor, part of the fight against terrorism in the Mediterranean. On 26 July 2013 she was showcased in Istanbul for The General Directorate of Armaments, Materials of Turkey, and the Navy of Turkey to support Navantia's options in securing a contract for the manufacture of several frigates for Turkey. In early August 2013 the frigate returned to base for maintenance. On 29 August 2013 she departed for the port of Málaga to start the second phase of her deployment which included the participation on the international exercise Brilliant Mariner 2013. On 13 October 2013 Blas de Lezo was relieved in Barcelona by Álvaro de Bazán.

On 11 July 2014 the frigate Cristóbal Colón returned from Operation Atalanta while the remaining four ships of the F-100 class were based in Ferrol. For the first time, the five F-100 frigates conducted joint training exercises as part of the 31st Escort Squadron.

On 28 June 2015 Blas de Lezo received her combat flag in Guecho, offered by the Royal Maritime Club of Abra and the Sports Club; sponsored by Ana of Orleans, Duchess of Calabria. In early October 2015 she participated in exercises of International Joint Ventures in Scottish waters; followed by participation in the multinational exercises Trident Juncture 2015, which took place in Spain, Italy and Portugal.

On 22 January 2022, amid the Russo-Ukrainian crisis, Blas de Lezo left Ferrol to join the Standing NATO Maritime Group 2, expected to be deployed in the Black Sea.

From June to July 2025, Leonor, Princess of Asturias, completed her naval military training at the ship.
