= Spanish ship Méndez Núñez =

Various Spanish Navy ships

Four ships of the Spanish Navy have borne the name Méndez Núñez, after the Spanish admiral Casto Méndez Núñez (1824–1869):

- Méndez Núñez, previously in service as the screw frigate Resolución from 1862 to 1867, then rebuilt as an ironclad central battery armoured corvette and in service as such with the name Méndez Núñez from 1870 until 1886.
- Méndez Núñez, a Blas de Lezo-class light cruiser in commission from 1924 to 1963.
- Méndez Núñez (D63), ex-USS O'Hare (DD-889/DDR-889), a Gearing-class destroyer (known as a Churruca-class destroyer in Spanish Navy service) acquired in 1973 and stricken and scrapped in 1992.
- Méndez Núñez (F104), an Álvaro de Bazán-class frigate commissioned in 2006.
