= Méndez Núñez =

Méndez Núñez or Mendez-Nuñez may refer to:

- Mendez, Cavite, officially the Municipality of Mendez-Nuñez, a fourth-class urban municipality in the province of Cavite, Philippines
- Casto Méndez Núñez (1824–1869), Spanish naval officer
- Spanish ship Méndez Núñez, several ships of the Spanish Navy
