= Spanish frigate Cristóbal Colón =

Spanish Navy ship of the Álvaro de Bazán-class

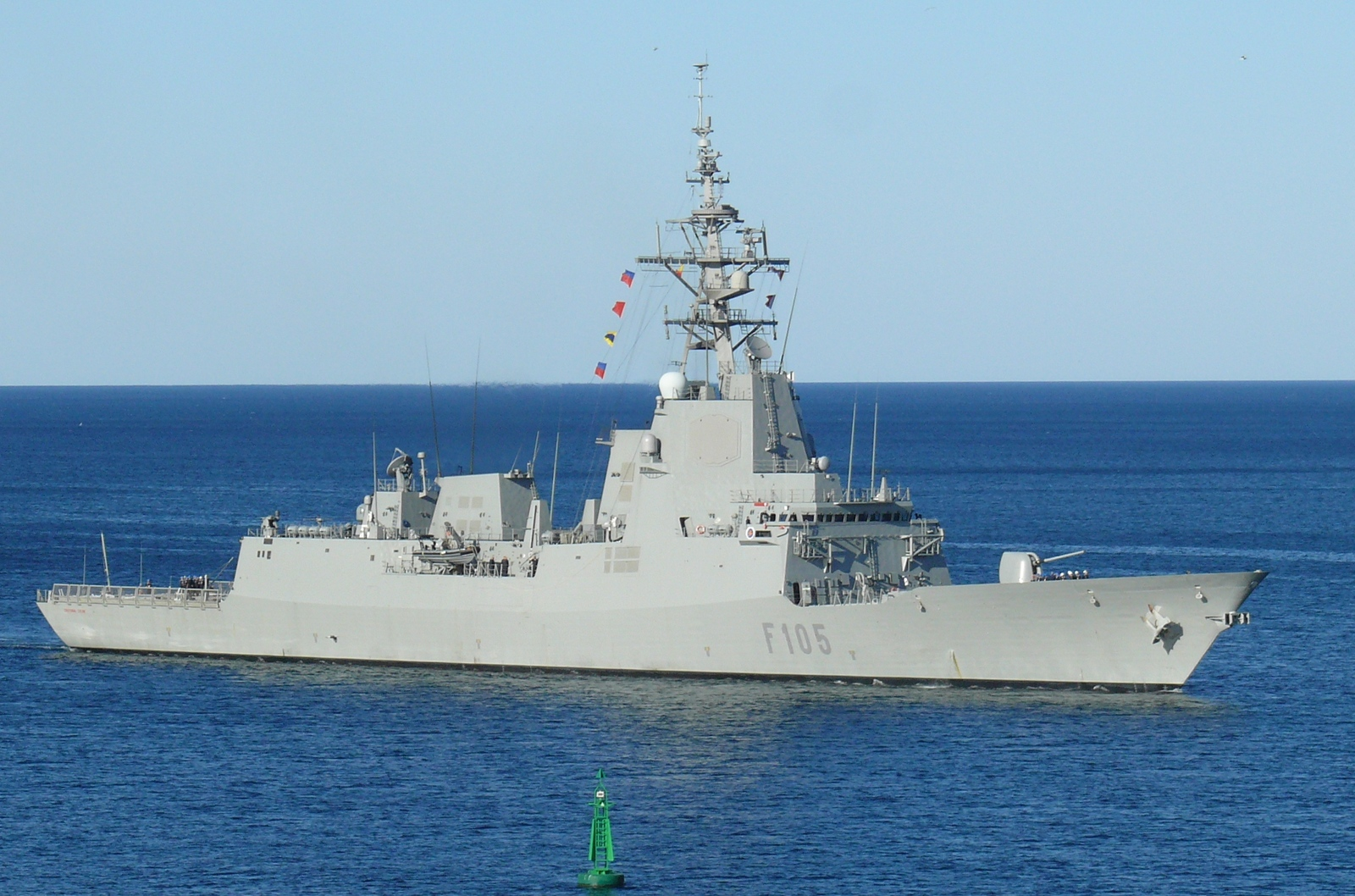
- Cristóbal Colón (F-105) in 2013

History

Spain
- Name: Cristóbal Colón
- Namesake: Christopher Columbus
- Ordered: 20 May 2005
- Builder: NAVANTIA, Ferrol Shipyard
- Cost: € 823 million
- Laid down: 29 June 2007
- Launched: 4 November 2010
- Commissioned: 23 October 2012
- Identification: pennant number: F105
- Status: in active service
- Badge

General characteristics
- Class & type: Álvaro de Bazán-class frigate
- Displacement: 6,391 tons full load
- Length: 146.7 metres (481 ft)
- Beam: 18.6 metres (61 ft)
- Draft: 7.8 metres (26 ft)
- Propulsion: CODOG; 2 × General Electric LM2500 gas turbines; 2 × Caterpillar 3600 diesel engines; 1 x Bow thruster of 850 kW (retractable)
- Speed: 28.5 knots (52.8 km/h; 32.8 mph)
- Range: 4,500 nautical miles (8,300 km; 5,200 mi)
- Complement: 216
- Sensors & processing systems: Lockheed Martin AN/SPY-1D 3-D multifunction radar; Raytheon SPS-67(V)4 surface search radar; Raytheon DE1160 LF active and passive sonar; Thales Scout navigation radar; 2 × Raytheon SPG-62 Mk99 radar illuminator; Aegis combat system
- Electronic warfare & decoys: 4 × FMC SRBOC Mk36 flare launchers; SLQ-25A Enhanced Nixie torpedo countermeasures; Indra SLQ-380 EW suite; CESELSA Elnath Mk 9000 interceptor
- Armament: 1 × 5-inch/54 Mk45 Mod 2 gun; Provision for one CIWS FABA 20mm/120 Meroka system.; 1 48 cell Mk 41 vertical launch systems; 32 × Standard SM-2MR Block IIIA; 64 × RIM-162 Evolved Sea Sparrow Missile; 8 × McDonnell Douglas RGM-84 Harpoon anti-shipping missile; 4 × 324 mm Mk32 Mod 9 triple Torpedo launchers with 12 Honeywell Mk46 mod 5 Torpedo; 2 x Mk 38
- Aircraft carried: 1 × SH-60 Seahawk or NH-90

Cristóbal Colón is the fifth and last ship of the Álvaro de Bazán-class of air defence frigates entering service with the Spanish Navy. The ship is named after Christopher Columbus, the Genoese explorer that claimed the discovery of North America in the name of the Crown of Castile. It is the most capable and modern warship of the Spanish Navy.

== Operational history ==
Cristóbal Colón was ordered on 20 May 2005 and construction started in the Ferrol shipyards on 29 June 2007. The ship was launched on 4 November 2010 and commissioned on 23 October 2012. The frigate was sponsored by the Infanta Margarita, Duchess of Soria.

On 9 February 2013, it sailed from its base in Ferrol, in its first navigation out of the Galician waters to set sail for the naval base of Rota, where it arrived on 11 February. It began a process of inspection, certification and naval training that ended on the 15 February. On 14 February a Sikorsky SH-3 made the first landing on its flight deck. On 24 February 2014, she sailed from her base in Ferrol to join the Operation Atalanta, anti-piracy operation in the Indian Ocean.

On 16 March 2014 she relieved Álvaro de Bazán at Djibouti. While in port an accidental firing of the 127 mm cannon occurred. The shell fell to the sea floor after flying over a hotel and a mosque. Spanish diplomatic authorities had to apologize. On 26 and 27 June 2014, the frigate escorted the cruiser USS Vella Gulf against conventional aerial threat in Vella Gulf's passage through the Mediterranean, as the US Navy was configuring a combat system to intercept ballistic targets outside the Earth's atmosphere. On 11 July she returned to her base in Ferrol. The other four ships of the class were also at Ferrol, so that for the first time, the five frigates of the class made a joint training exercise as part of the 31st Escort Squadron.

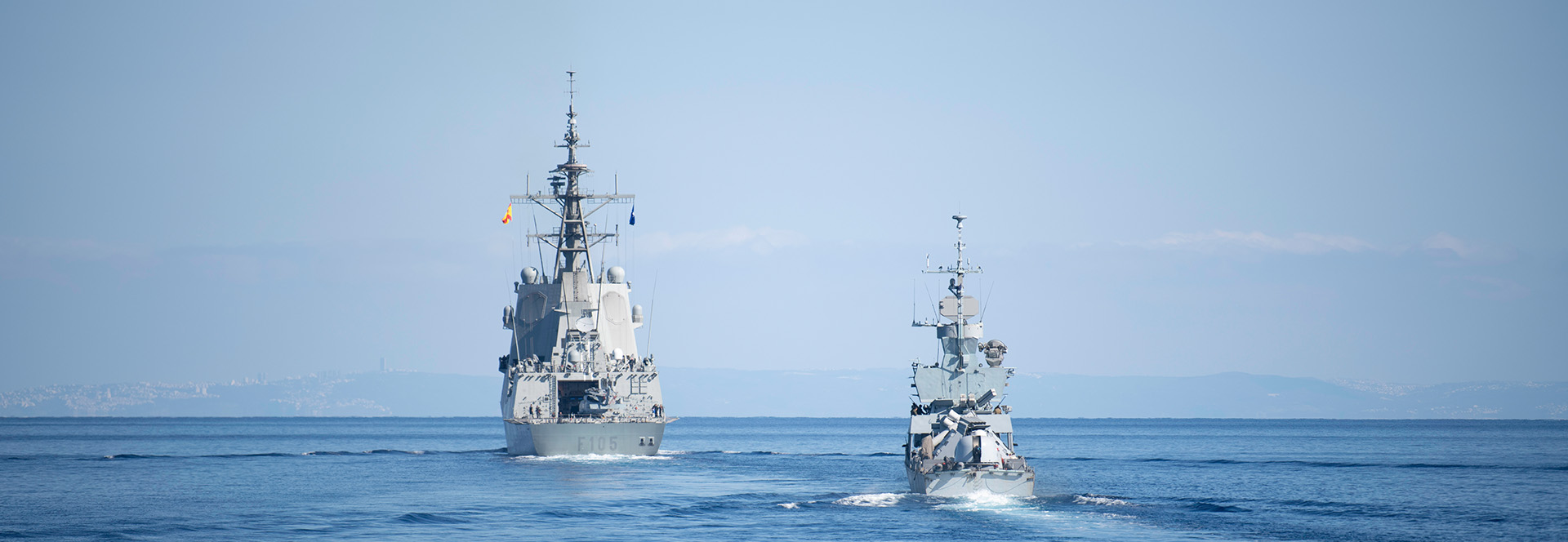
Cristóbal Colón during a visit to the Port of Haifa, training with Israeli forces in Standing NATO Maritime Group 2

In mid-July 2016 Cristóbal Colón certified her combat system in Norfolk, Virginia with the American destroyer USS Arleigh Burke, after which she made a stopover in Halifax, Canada, to support Navantia's commercial options in a contest for the construction of fifteen frigates. The ship arrived at her base in Ferrol on 2 August 2016.

On 9 January 2017, F105 sailed from her base in Ferrol to Australia, arriving on 20 February. There she helped train the crews of Australian Hobart-class ships based on the Álvaro de Bazán class. On 20 and 21 January, a stopover took place in the Saudi Arabian port of Yeda, where the ship received a delegation from the Royal Saudi Navy. On 24 June, the frigate finished its deployment in Australia and began its return to base. After stopping in Papeete, French Polynesia and Callao, Peru it arrived back at Ferrol in August. The ship participated in exercise UNITAS 2017 between July 13 and 26.

In early March 2026 the frigate was deployed to prevent further potential Iranian attacks on Cyprus.

== Differences from the rest of the class ==
The design of the Cristóbal Colón incorporates several improvements with respect to the original design of the class. It incorporates new Bravo 16V engines that increase its maximum speed and a bow thruster of 850 kW for operations in port. In weaponry and combat systems, two 25mm Mk 38 guns are added for close defense, a new electronic and submarine warfare control system, Aries surface surveillance radar, SPY-1 radar improvements, and improvements in communications and control systems. F105 can also operate with NH 90 helicopters by expanding the hangar and flight deck.

== See also ==
- F110-class frigate
- Spanish frigate Blas de Lezo
