= Hijacking of the Playa de Bakio =

2008 hijacking of a Spanish boat by Somali pirates

The boat was hijacked off the coast of Somalia.

The hijacking of the Playa de Bakio was an incident that occurred between April 20 and 26, 2008. During those days the crew of the Spanish boat Playa de Bakio was held by pirates off the coast of Somalia.

== Boat and crew ==
Prototypical tuna freezer boat.

The hijacked vessel was a tuna freezer boat, owned by the company Pesquera Vasco Montañesa (Pevasa), based in the Biscayan municipality of Bermeo. It is a ship with a simple structure, with slow movements due to the large freezer hold in its lower part. Tuna fishing in this modality, being with purse seine nets, makes it necessary for the vessel to have cranes to raise each catch, which results in the low speed of the boat.

The Playa de Bakio, at the time of the hijacking, had a crew of 26 people: 13 Spaniards (8 of Galician origin and 5 of Basque origin) and 13 Africans. The vessel had been in the area fishing for tuna since April 15, 5 days before the hijacking. In principle, their activity consisted of loading the holds in international waters for several days and, when they were full, approaching the coast to unload them and return to fish.

== Events ==
=== Background ===
The precedent most often used by the Spanish press to illustrate the hijacking of the Playa de Bakio was the capture of a French yacht, the Le Ponant, only fifteen days earlier. During that incident, more than thirty people were held by a group of pirates similar to those who would later hijack the Spanish vessel. In this case, the ship's owner had to pay a ransom of nearly two million US dollars. Half of the pirates were arrested and part of the money recovered.

=== Hijacking ===
The hijacking of the Basque tuna vessel was swift. Speaking in terms of the Somali time zone, in the late afternoon of April 20, a small boat with three or four individuals on board approached the vessel, which was attacked with grenade launchers and subsequently boarded by the entire commando, which overpowered the crew and took control of the Playa de Bakio.

The first firsthand news came on April 22, when the kidnappers allowed the ship's skipper, Amadeo Álvarez, to make a call to his family. During that conversation, which was transmitted to the press by Álvarez's daughter, the kidnapping was narrated, an attempt was made to reassure the families and it was stated that there were no injuries. On the other hand, the kidnappers' intentions were made clear, and they assured that their intention was to obtain money through the payment of a ransom. Meanwhile, the Spanish government began to organize the follow-up of the case. The first decisions taken led to the deployment of the frigate Méndez Núñez, the fastest of the Spanish Navy, which would take 48 hours to reach Somalia.

=== Shore landfall ===
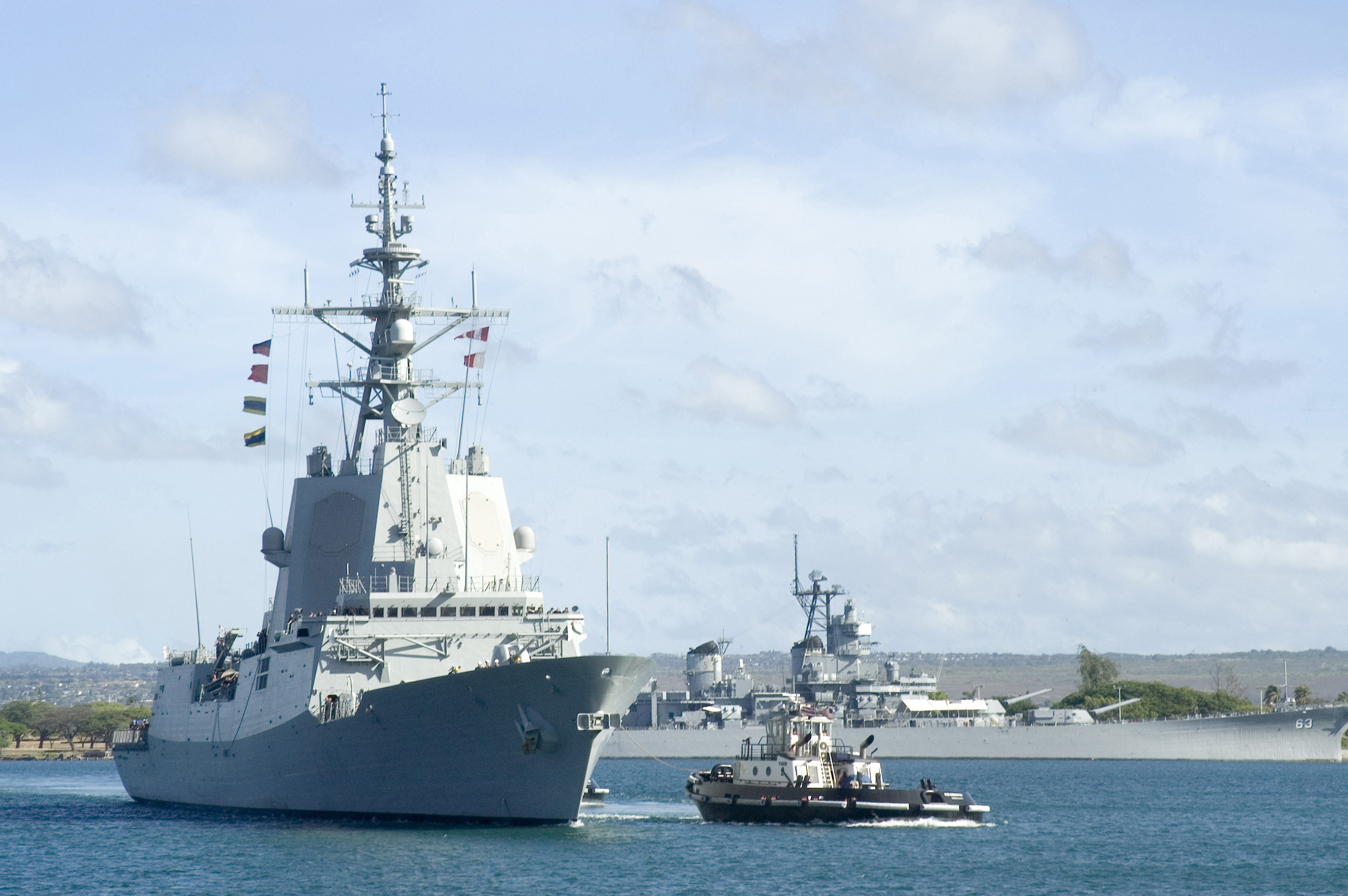
The frigate Méndez Núñez, sailing off the coast of Hawaii in 2007.

The following day, April 22, the hijackers allowed a new call to be made, this time by one of the crew members: Mikel Arana. During the call, the sailor updated the information on his situation, and indicated that the ship had been anchored off the coast of Somalia. In addition, Arana indicated that new members of the group that had hijacked the ship had gained access to it, and that there were close to 10 pirates.

After that, there was a slowdown in the course of events. For three days, the Playa de Bakio was anchored off the coast, receiving supplies and instructions. At the same time, the frigate Méndez Núñez arrived in the area. From April 24, it could already be seen operating in the area.

The strategy followed was to remain at a certain safe distance, so that the frigate would go unnoticed by the pirates but would be able to follow any movement of the tuna boat.

However, the pirates' situation was not as favorable —for them— as could have been expected, because while anchored offshore they came under pressure from other paramilitary groups, who threatened to attack the ship and "steal" the hostages. This had two immediate consequences: first, it improved the willingness of the kidnappers to seek a peaceful solution to the hijacking; second, it forced them to move the boat.

=== Return to high seas ===
Thus, on April 25, the hijacked ship returned to the high seas. Apparently, a group of Islamist rebels based in Somalia had begun operations to attack the ship and capture the hostages. After several days of hijacking, morale began to wane among the crew of the Basque tuna boat. This was reported by the ship's captain, Amadeo Álvarez, just one day before returning to the high seas.

According to news reports at this time, the vessel was taken about 160 kilometers from the coast. At all times, the frigate Méndez Núñez followed the movements of the Playa de Bakio relatively closely.

The "official" information at this point is scarce, and various media, already dispatched to the area through special envoys, contacted local fishermen. One of these, Abduqadir Ahmed, indicated that before returning to the open sea they not only stocked up on food, but also on medicines. This indicated that, despite the need to reach a solution, the pirates were prepared to remain on the Playa de Bakio for a long time.

=== Liberation ===
After almost a week of kidnapping, the rescue of the crew of the Playa de Bakio was announced on April 26. The deputy prime minister, María Teresa Fernández de la Vega, held a press conference in which she stated that the crew was in good condition, and that work was already underway to move them to a safer area. According to the press conference, the release was the result of hard diplomatic work carried out between the ship's owner and the Spanish government.

Although María Teresa Fernández de la Vega never acknowledged that a ransom payment had been made, there were early reports that this had indeed occurred. This was later confirmed by Andrew Mwangura, head of an organization dedicated to finding lost ships in the area, and by the chairman of the port authority of the Somali town of Haradhere, Abdisalam Khalif Ahmed. Most sources claim that the ransom payment was $1.2 million (770,000 euros) paid by the shipowner. According to Abdisalam Khalif Ahmed himself, the pirates abandoned the ship after receiving the ransom payment via a small craft.

The route map drawn up at the time proposed, escorted by the Méndez Núñez, the return to the Seychelles Islands, where the tuna fleet was based, and from there back to Spain. Although they were escorted at all times by the frigate, on May 4, with the crew already in Spain, it was revealed that a different group of pirates than the one that carried out the hijacking intended to recapture the vessel when the Playa de Bakio was moving away from Somalia. Apparently, they were deterred by the presence of the Spanish Navy frigate.

== Return to Spain ==
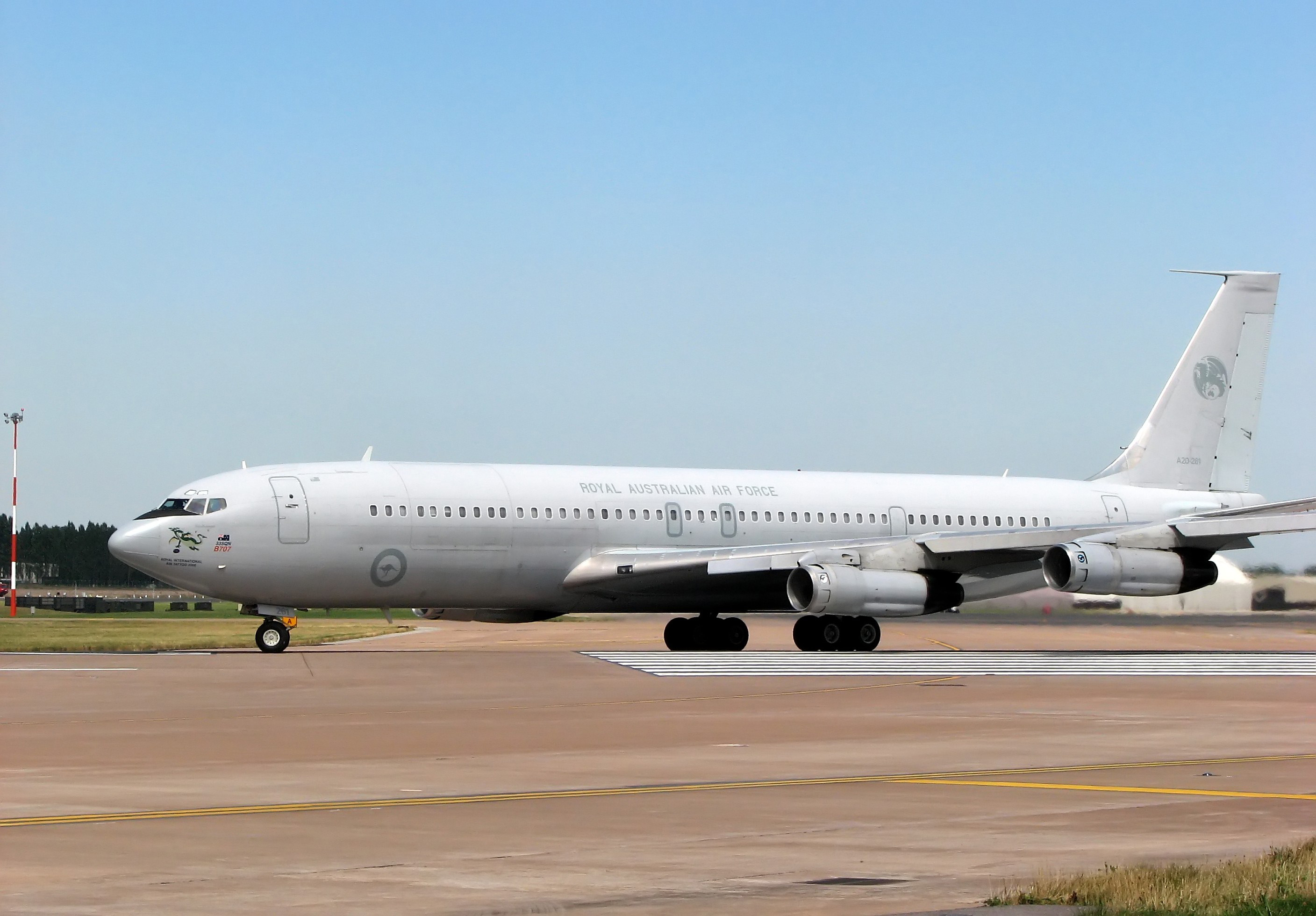
Boeing 707 similar to the one that transported the sailors to Spain.

Thus, on April 29, all the Spanish crew members arrived in the Seychelles Islands. A Boeing 707 of the Spanish Armed Forces would be in charge of transferring the 26 sailors to the Torrejón de Ardoz Air Base. Once there, the crew was divided into two flights, one bound for Galicia and the other for the Basque Country.

On April 30, the sailors finally arrived at their places of origin. The first to do so were the Galicians, who were received by the president of the regional government, Emilio Pérez Touriño.

The five Basque crew members arrived a few minutes later at Bilbao Airport. There, some of them, such as Petty Officer Ángel Fernández, made some statements after being received by Paulino Luesma, the government delegate in the Basque Country. After leaving the Spanish crew members, the Boeing 707 stopped in the Egyptian city of Luxor, where the 13 African crew members stayed.

== Diplomatic action ==
The hijacking of the Playa de Bakio was addressed diplomatically on two sides. On the one hand, Spain's ambassador to Kenya, Nicolás Martín Cinto, went to Somalia on April 22 to try to reach a non-violent solution.

Martín Cinto was sent there not only for his long career as a diplomat, but also for his skills as a negotiator, since he has collaborated in negotiation processes with terrorists of all kinds, from members of ETA to participants in the riots of the 2007 Kenyan crisis. Some media, such as El Imparcial, consider him the true architect of the liberation of the Playa de Bakio.

On the other hand, the ransom to be paid was negotiated in a luxury hotel in London. The location was chosen because the pirate group has a relationship with British mercenaries, and they have a relationship with the authorities through a British law firm. It was there that the amount of the ransom, the method of payment and the conditions for abandoning the ship were fixed.

=== UN Resolution ===
On June 2, 2008, the United Nations Security Council adopted a resolution authorizing, with the consent of the Somali authorities, foreign vessels to pursue pirate ships in Somali waters. The resolution is based on Chapter VII of the Charter of the United Nations, which calls for the use of force to comply with the Council's decisions.

This decision is not directly related to the Playa de Bakio incident, although the Spanish ambassador to the UN, Juan Antonio Yáñez Barnuevo, was part of an informal group in support of measures to protect vessels fishing off the coast of Somalia.

== See also ==
- Piracy off the coast of Somalia
- Somalia–Spain relations
