= Spanish frigate Almirante Juan de Borbón =

2002 Álvaro de Bazán-class frigate

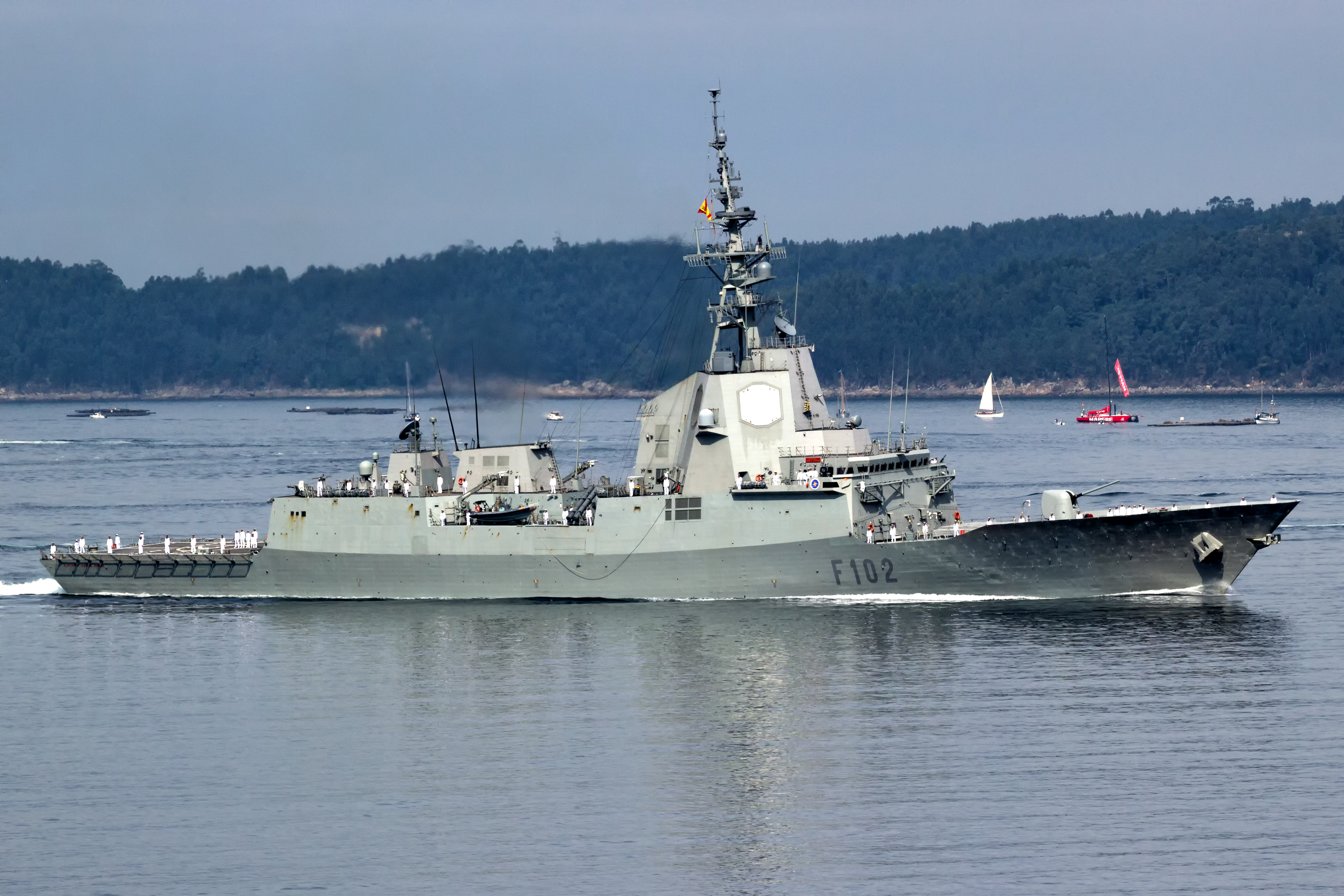
- A side view of Almirante Juan de Borbón in 2017

History

Spain
- Name: Almirante Juan de Borbón
- Namesake: Infante Juan de Borbón, Count of Barcelona
- Builder: Izar
- Cost: 600 million €
- Laid down: October 2001
- Launched: 28 February 2002
- Commissioned: 3 December 2003
- Home port: Ferrol
- Identification: Pennant number: F-102; EBDB
- Status: Ship in active service
- Badge

General characteristics
- Class & type: Álvaro de Bazán-class frigate
- Displacement: 5,800 t (5,700 long tons)
- Length: 146.7 m (481 ft 4 in)
- Beam: 18.6 m (61 ft 0 in)
- Draft: 4.75 m (15 ft 7 in)
- Speed: 28.5 knots (52.8 km/h; 32.8 mph)
- Range: 4,500 nmi (8,300 km; 5,200 mi)

Almirante Juan de Borbón (F-102) is the second ship of the new F-100 class of air defence frigates entering service with the Spanish Navy in 2003. She is named for Infante Juan de Borbón, Count of Barcelona, father of the former King of Spain, Juan Carlos I.

== History ==
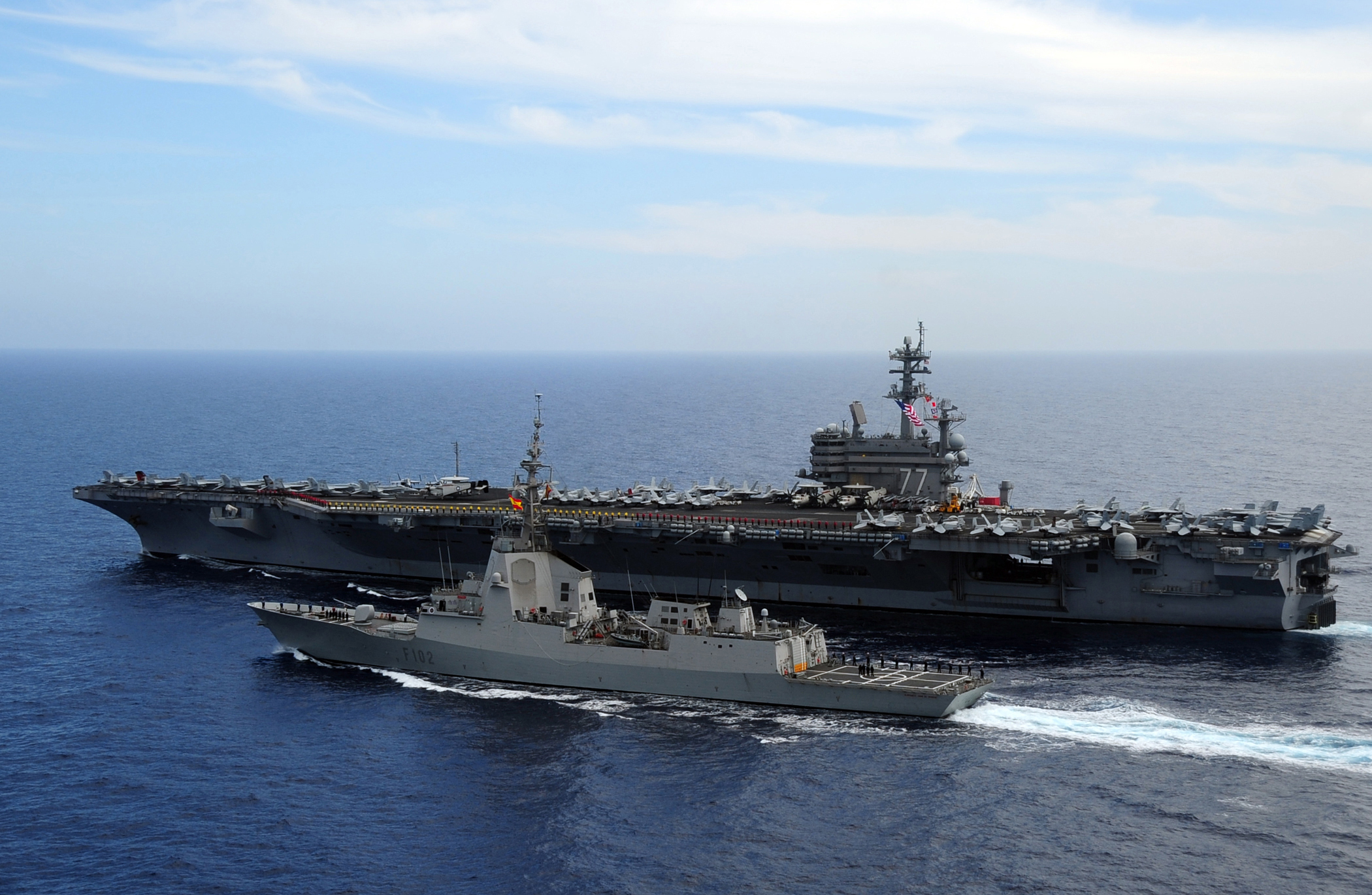
Almirante Juan de Borbón underway with the aircraft carrier USS George H.W. Bush

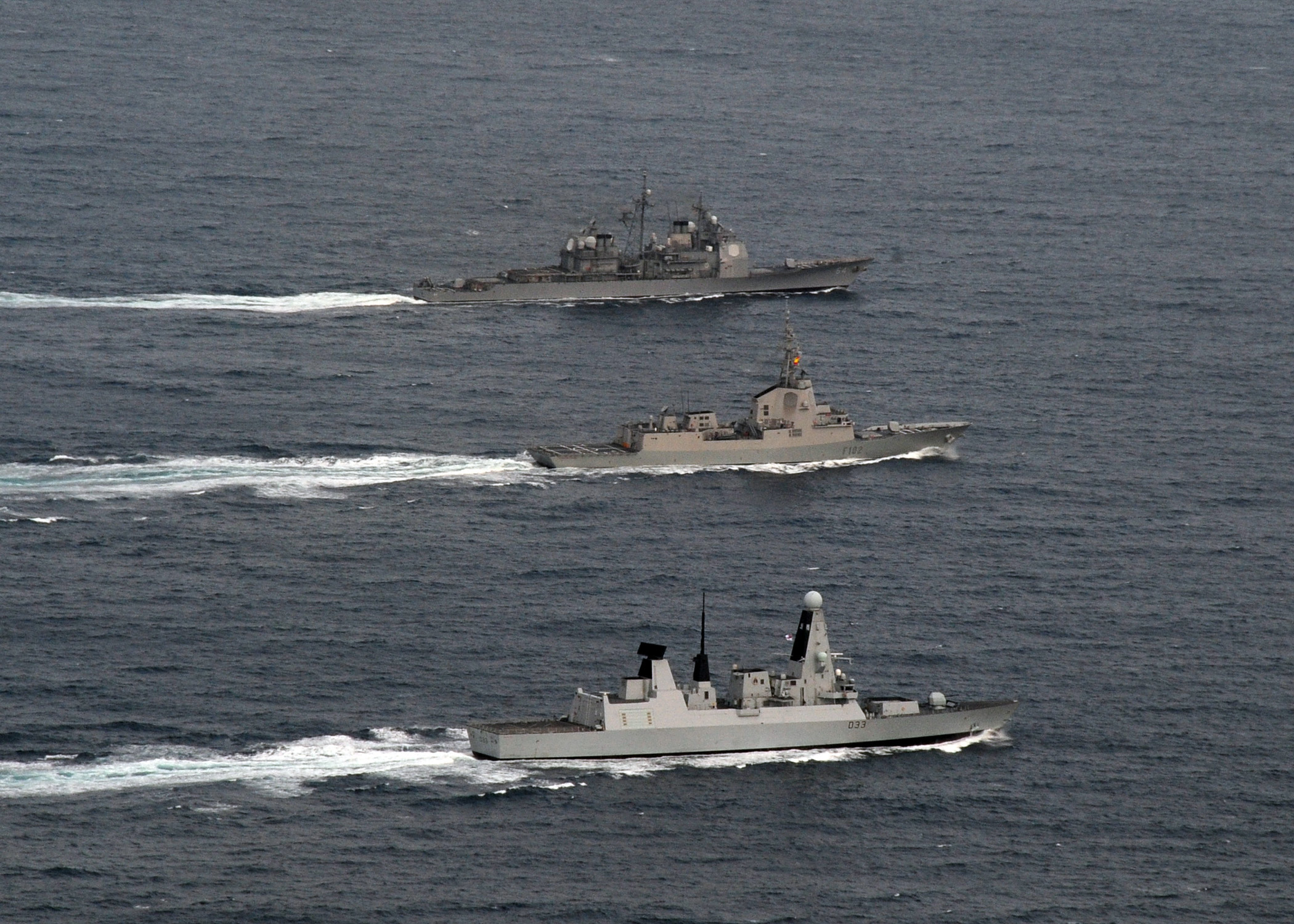
The Royal Navy destroyer HMS Dauntless (bottom), Almirante Juan de Borbón (middle), and the American guided-missile cruiser USS Gettysburg (top) underway in formation during the joint exercise Saxon Warrior 11

- September 8, 2006 - Departs from Rota to escort the Spanish troops en route to Lebanon
- November 12, 2006 - Arrives at Rota, returning from Lebanon without incident
- February 2007 - Participates in GALIBER 07 Exercises
- March 2007 - Returns to port
- May 2007 - Sails for trials at Cartagena
- June 2007 - Sails to Norway (Stavanger) and Greece (Chania and Heraklion) returning to base by the end of the month
- January 2008 - Sails to Cádiz and is forced back by malfunction, expending some time in repairs.
- April 2008 - Sails to Brest (France) to perform combat qualification with the French Navy
- June 2008 - Sails to Estonia and returns in December of the same year
- January 2010 - Sails to Portugal and Cádiz
- May–June 2010 - Sails to perform combat qualifications
- January 12, 2011 - Arrives at Naval Station Norfolk, Virginia, prior to the warship's participation with Carrier Strike Group Two during its Composite Unit Training Exercise (COMPTUEX) and Joint Task Force Exercise (JTFEX) underway period.

== Specifications ==
- Builder: Izar, Astillero Ferrol
- Propulsion: 2 × General Electric LM2500 gas turbines, 2 × Caterpillar 3600 diesel engines
- Shafts: 2 (Wärtsilä controllable pitch propellers)
- Length: 146.7 m (482 ft)
- Beam: 18.6 m (61 ft)
- Draught: 4.75 (15 ft)
- Displacement: 5,800 tons (full load)
- Speed: 28.5 knots (52+ km/h)
- Range: 4500 NM
- Cost: 600 million €
- Crew: 250 (48 officers)
- Armament:
  - 1 × 5-inch/54 Mk45 Mod 2 gun
  - 2 × CIWS FABA 20mm/120 Meroka gun
  - 6 × Mk41 8-cell VLS
    - SAM: 32 × Standard SM-2 Block IIIA
    - SAM: 64 × RIM-162 Evolved Sea Sparrow Missile
  - SSM: 8 × McDonnell Douglas RGM-84 Harpoon anti-ship missile
  - ASW: 4 × 324 mm Mk32 Mod 9 triple Torpedo launchers with 12 Honeywell Mk46 mod 5 Torpedo
- Helicopter:
  - 1 × Sikorsky SH-60B LAMPS III Seahawk
- Electronics
  - Sonar: ENOSA-Raytheon DE 1160LF (I)
  - Radar: Lockheed Martin AN/SPY-1D 3-D multifunction
  - Surface Radar: Raytheon SPS-67(V)4
  - Weapon Control: Aegis combat system, 2 × Raytheon SPG-62 Mk99 radar illuminator, 1 × FABA DORNA fire control
  - Navigation: Thales Scout
- Countermeasures
  - 4 × FMC SRBOC Mk36 flare launchers
  - SLQ-25A Enhanced Nixie torpedo countermeasures
  - ESM/ECM: Indra SLQ-380
  - CESELSA Elnath Mk 9000 interceptor
