= Somalia–Spain relations =

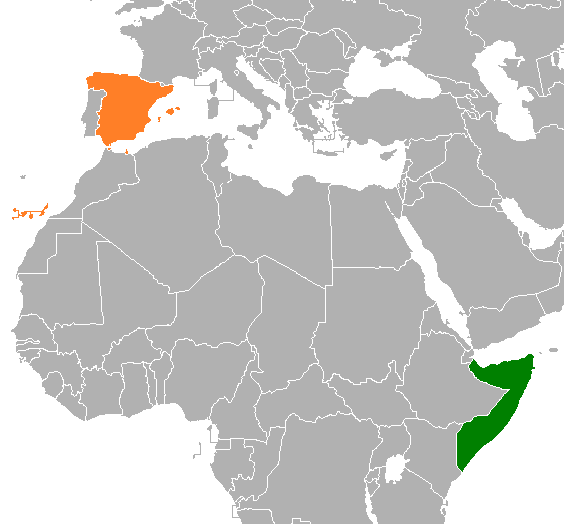
- Somalia: Spain

Somalia–Spain relations are the bilateral and diplomatic relations between these two countries. Somalia has no embassy in Spain, nor Spain in Somalia, but the Spanish embassy in Nairobi is accredited to Somalia.

== History ==
Diplomatic relations between Somalia and Spain were established in 1968, but became frozen in the wake of the 1991 Somali Civil War.

=== Hijacking of the Playa de Bakio and the Alakrana ===
On April 20, 2008, amid rising piracy off the coast of Somalia, the Spain-registered tuna fishing boat Playa de Bakio was hijacked by pirates about 217 nautical miles (402 km; 250 mi) off the coast of Somalia, with 13 Spaniards and 13 Africans on board. The seized ship was moored near Hobyo, in the semiautonomous region of Puntland. With no diplomatic presence in Somalia, Spain dispatched its ambassador to Kenya to the Somali capital of Mogadishu on April 23 to persuade local Somali authorities to avoid attempting to liberate the hostages by force. The Playa de Bakio was freed on April 26, 2008, and escorted by a Spanish frigate to the Seychelles. Local authorities claimed that the pirates were given a $1.2 million ransom.

On October 2, 2009, Somali pirates hijacked the tuna fishing vessel Alakrana off the coast of Somalia, with 36 crewmembers on board. Spain reportedly began working on opening a diplomatic channel with Somali authorities on the matter. One day later, Spain arrested two Somali pirates and extradited them to Spain to stand trial, further complicating the ransom negotiations of the hijackers of the Alakrana. Spain's ambassador to Kenya, Nicolas Martin, met with Prime Minister Omar Sharmarke of Somalia in Nairobi, Kenya on October 10. According to a senior official who accompanied the PM, Spain promised the Somali government to help put an end to piracy, while the Somali government also asked for help against Al-Shabaab. Somali authorities were "very optimistic" about a prompt resolution of the hostage situation. On November 7, the pirates threatened to kill three hostages unless the two pirates arrested were extradited from Spain to Somalia to stand trial. Over a month after the seizure of the vessel, Spanish Justice minister confirmed that an extradition agreement was being studied by the Spanish government, leading the Spanish press to conclude that an extradition agreement between Somalia and Spain was being negotiated. On November 10, the Somali PM and the Spanish ambassador to Kenya met again in Kenya to finalize the extradition of the two pirates to Mogadishu, controlled by the Somali federal authorities. However, on November 16, the Audiencia Nacional indicted the two pirates on counts of kidnapping and robbery. The ship and crew of the Alakrana were freed on November 17 after $3.5 million in ransom were disbursed to the pirates. The two pirates in Spanish custody never saw extradition to Somalia, and were condemned to 439 years in prison each in 2011.

=== Operation Atalanta and EUTM Somalia ===
Since 2008, Spain has taken part in the two EU operations in Somalia: the anti-piracy Operation Atalanta since January 2009, and the European Union Training Mission in Somalia to train the Somali National Army of the Federal Government of Somalia. Together with France, Spain has been one of the two main leaders of Operation Atalanta, and the leader of EUTM Somalia. Naval Station Rota in Spain has been the operational headquarters of Operation Atalanta since 2019.

=== Normalization of relations ===
In late 2012, following the election of president Hassan Sheikh Mohamud and the end of the Transitional Federal Government of Somalia, Spain moved to have its Ambassador to Kenya accredited to Somali authorities.

In 2014, Somali foreign minister Abdirahman Duale Beyle became the first foreign minister of Somalia to visit Spain. He acknowledged that Spain was one of the countries that supported Somalia, and hoped to discuss security and health issues with his Spanish counterpart, José Manuel García-Margallo. Beyle and García-Margallo discussed potential funding for Somalia's government "Give Your Gun and Go to School" vocational training program, and García-Margallo reaffirmed Spain's commitment to Operation Atalanta and EUTM Somalia. Beyle also met with a Real Madrid executive to encourage the club to foster football in Somalia.

== Diplomatic relations ==
Spain has formally accredited an Ambassador to Somalia, residing in Nairobi. In the spring of 2011 the most severe drought period of the last 60 years in the Horn of Africa began. This situation worsened significantly in areas controlled by Al Shabaab. In August 2011, the UN declared a famine situation in 6 districts of Somalia, finding that 3.7 million people were at risk and 250,000 could die if immediate food aid was not provided.

Spain was active and supportive in the humanitarian aspects of the crisis, becoming the fifth humanitarian contributor to Somalia in 2010 and 2011, through contributions to the United Nations system. The Spanish contribution to this crisis amounted to €25 million in 2011. Spain has also been active in the security sector for Somalia, being a leading country in the EUTM training mission for Somali military and with a very significant participation (second or third contributing country, according to the moment) to the EUCAP Néstor Mission and the ATALANTA operation against piracy in waters near Somalia, with the constant presence of two ships and a maritime patrol aircraft. It is also worth mentioning the visits to Mogadishu of the Minister of Defense, Mr. Morenés, in May 2015 and January 2016.

== Economic relations ==
There are no Spanish trade or investment statistics in Somalia. Some Spanish fishing companies have continued to fish in international waters near Somalia. The tuna fishery is especially profitable in this area, so, predictably, the Spanish tuna fleet will once again work in this fishing ground when the necessary legal and maritime safety conditions exist.

== Cooperation ==
=== Food assistance ===
In 2009, Spain announced it would provide 75 million euros in food assistance to Somalia and the Horn of Africa through the World Food Programme. In 2011, the Secretary of State for Foreign Affairs travelled to Somalia to meet with Somali authorities and take stock of the delivery of food assistance.

=== Health assistance ===
In 2011, Spain donated 1 million euros to the World Health Organization for a vaccination campaign against measles and cholera in Somalia.

=== Security and military cooperation ===
In the wake of the seizure of the Spanish fishing vessel Alakrana, a Somali official accompanying Prime Minister Omar Sharmarke declared that a Spain had promised "military cooperation and aid" in the fight against piracy off the coast of Somalia. In exchange for the Somali government helping to free the imprisoned sailors, Spain would begin the extradition process of two Somali pirates arrested off the coast of Somalia.

In 2016, Spain donated military uniforms and materiel to the Somali Armed Forces. In 2021, the Head of EUTM Somalia and the Chief of Defence Force of Somalia signed a manual against Improvised explosive devices prepared by Spanish military officials to counter the threat of IEDs.

== Official visits ==
=== From Somalia to Spain ===
- Speaker of the Parliament of Somalia Aden Madobe (2010)
- TFG President Sharif Sheikh Ahmed visited Madrid in September 2010 to participate in the International Contact Group (ICG) meetings.
- Foreign Minister Abdirahman Duale Beyle (2014)

=== From Spain to Somalia ===
The Secretary of State for International Cooperation visited Mogadishu in August 2011 to learn directly about the operations of the World Food Program in that city and held a working meeting with government representatives. The Minister of Defense, Pedro Morenés, visited Mogadishu in May 2015 and in January 2016.

== See also ==
- Foreign relations of Somalia
- Foreign relations of Spain
