= Álvaro de Bazán-class frigate =

Class of Spanish air defence frigates

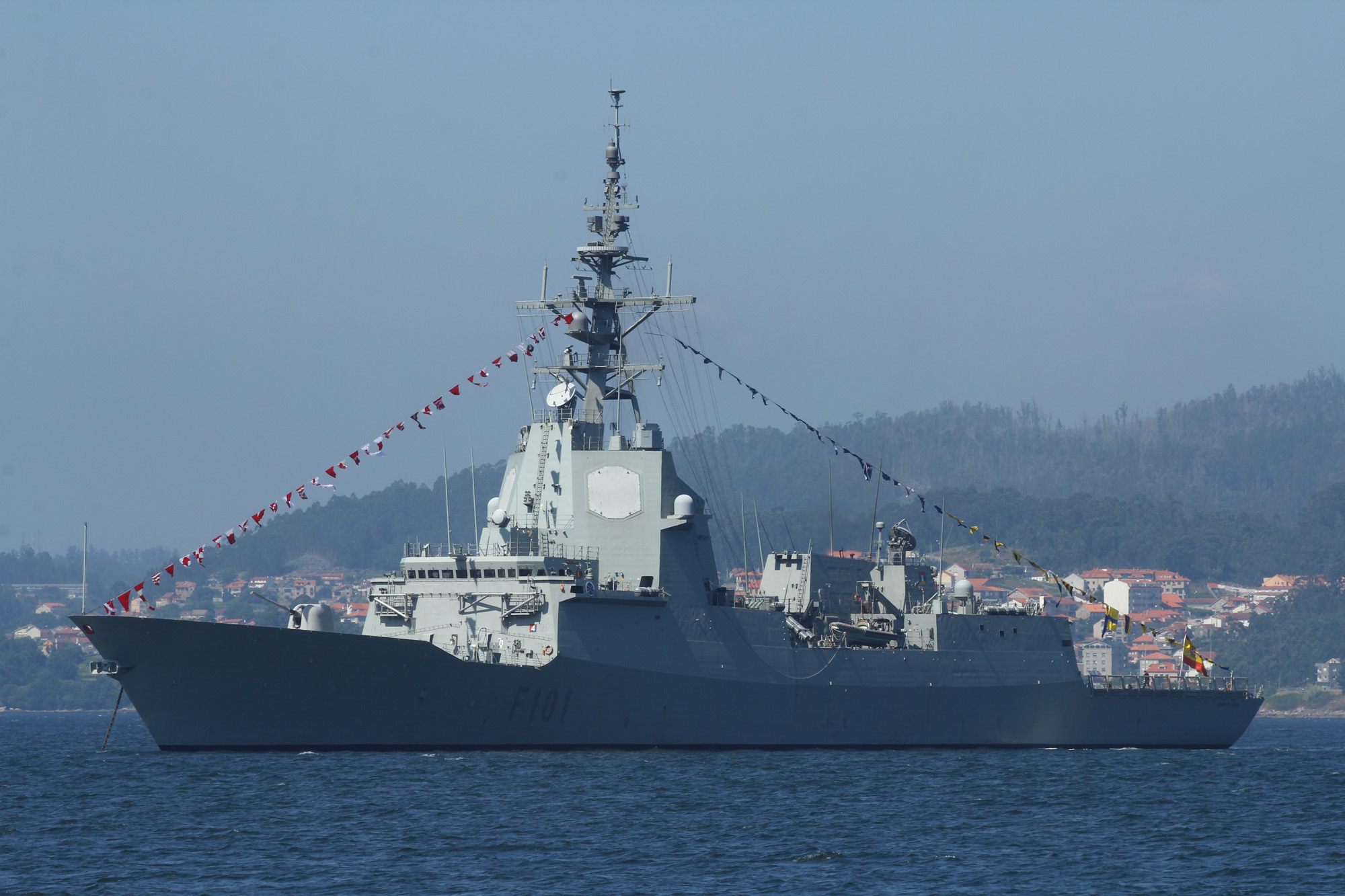
- Álvaro de Bazán, lead ship of the class, in 2014.

Class overview
- Name: Álvaro de Bazán class
- Builders: NAVANTIA-IZAR, Astillero Ferrol
- Operators: Spanish Navy; Royal Australian Navy; |Royal Norwegian Navy
- Preceded by: Baleares-class frigate (Spain); Perth-class destroyer (Australia); Adelaide-class frigate (Australia); Oslo-class frigate (Norway)
- Succeeded by: F110-class frigate (Spain); Type 26 frigate (Norway)
- Subclasses: Hobart-class destroyer (Australia); Fridtjof Nansen-class frigate (Norway)
- Cost: F101-4: €453 million per unit; F105: €834 million
- Planned: 6
- Cancelled: 1
- Active: 5

General characteristics
- Type: Guided-missile frigate
- Displacement: 5,800 long tons (5,900 t) (standard load); 6,391 long tons (6,494 t) (full load)
- Length: 146.7 m (481 ft 4 in)
- Beam: 18.6 m (61 ft 0 in)
- Draft: 4.75 m (15 ft 7 in)
- Installed power: 46,650 hp (34,790 kW) gas turbines; 12,000 hp (8,900 kW) diesel engines
- Propulsion: CODOG: 2 × General Electric LM2500 gas turbines; 2 × Caterpillar 3600 diesel engines; 2 × Propellers
- Speed: 28 kn (52 km/h; 32 mph)
- Range: 4,500 nmi (8,300 km; 5,200 mi) at 18 kn (33 km/h; 21 mph)
- Complement: 201
- Sensors & processing systems: Lockheed Martin AN/SPY-1D 3D multifunction radar; Raytheon SPS-67(V)4 surface search radar; Raytheon DE1160 LF active and passive sonar; 2 × ARIES navigation/surface radar; 2 × Raytheon AN/SPG-62 Mk99 radar illuminator
- Electronic warfare & decoys: 4 × FMC SRBOC Mk36 flare launchers; SLQ-25A Enhanced Nixie torpedo countermeasures; Indra SLQ-380 EW suite; Indra Mk 9500 interceptor
- Armament: 1 × 5 in (127.0 mm)/54 Mk45 Mod 2 gun; Provision for one CIWS FABA 20 mm/120 Meroka system.; 1 × Mark 41 (VLS) (48-cell); 2 × 20 mm autocannon (F101-104); 2 × 25 mm autocannon (F105); 4 × 12.7 mm M2 Browning machine guns in Sentinel RWS; 32 × Standard SM-2MR Block IIIA; 64 × RIM-162 Evolved Sea Sparrow Missile (4 per cell); 8× RGM-84 Harpoon (To be replaced with Naval Strike Missile); 2 × twin 12.75 in (323.8 mm) Mark 32 Mod 9 torpedo tubes with 12 Honeywell Mark 46 Mod 5 torpedoes
- Aircraft carried: 1 × SH-60 Seahawk

The Álvaro de Bazán class, also known as the F100 class, is a class of Aegis combat system-equipped air defence frigates in service with the Spanish Navy. The vessels were built by Spanish shipbuilder Navantia in Ferrol, with the lead ship of the class named for Admiral Álvaro de Bazán.

== Design ==
The ships are fitted with the United States Aegis weapons system allowing them to track hundreds of airborne targets simultaneously as part of its air defence network. The Álvaro de Bazán-class multi-role frigates are one of the few non-US warships to carry the Aegis system and its associated SPY-1D radar. The American Arleigh Burke class, Japanese Kongo class, South Korean Sejong the Great class, Australian Hobart class, and the Norwegian Fridtjof Nansen class also use the Aegis system.

When the F-100 was designed, the United States communicated that it was impossible to implement the Aegis system in ships of less than 7,000 tonnes (15,000,000 lb), for this reason, after the construction and tests, the United States Navy congratulated and recognized the capacity of the Spanish ships, in addition to the fact that the radars are higher on the Spanish ships and therefore receive information earlier than U.S. or Japanese ships.

The Álvaro de Bazán-class frigates are the first modern vessels of the Spanish Navy to incorporate ballistic resistant steel in the hull, along with the power plants being mounted on anti-vibration mounts to reduce noise and make them less detectable by submarines. The original contract for four ships was worth €1.683 billion but they ended up costing €1.81 billion. As of 2010 it was estimated that the final vessel, F-105 would cost €834m (~US$1.1bn).

== Ships in class ==
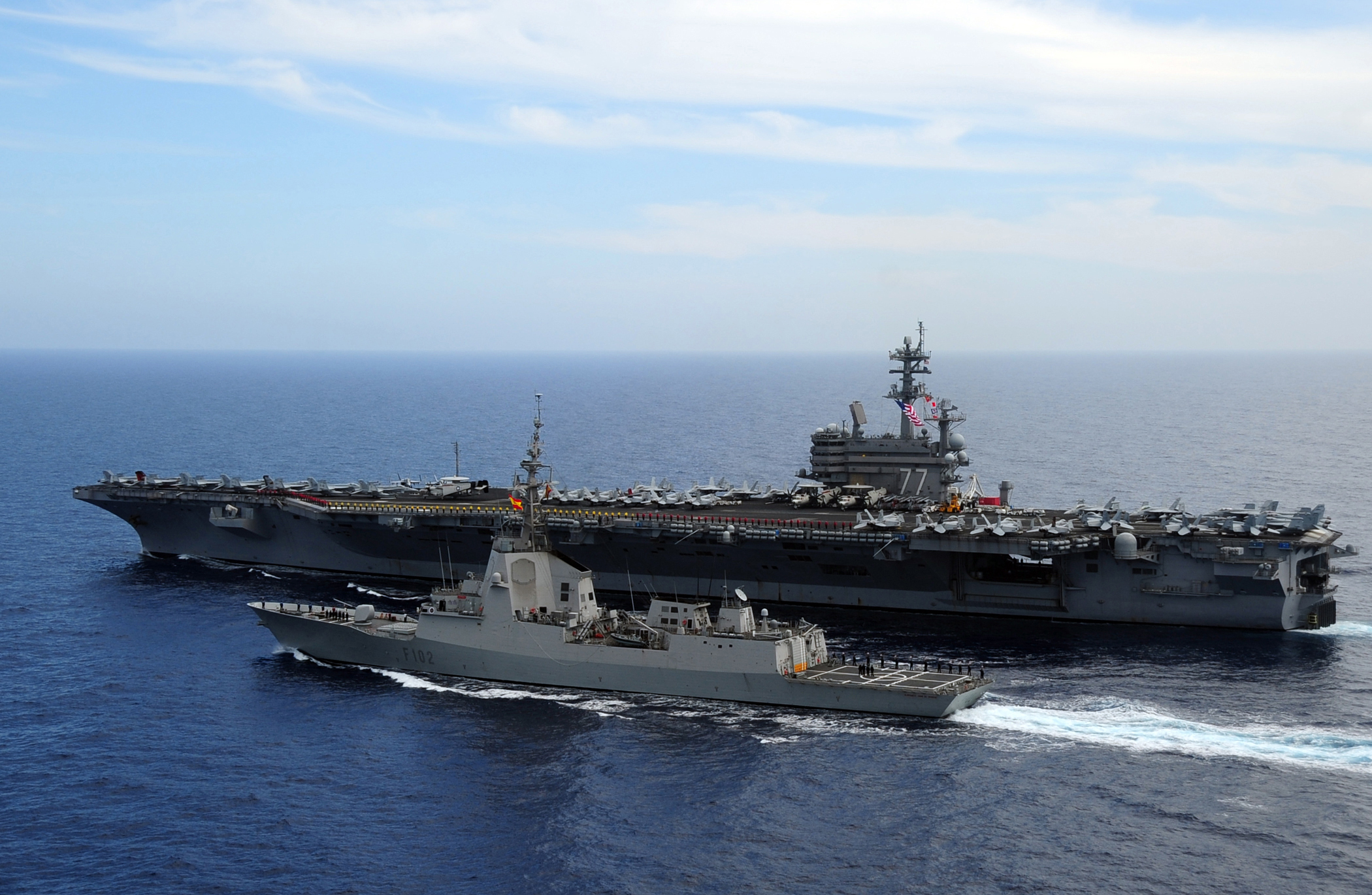
Álvaro de Bazán-class frigate Almirante Juan de Borbón underway with the aircraft carrier USS George H.W. Bush

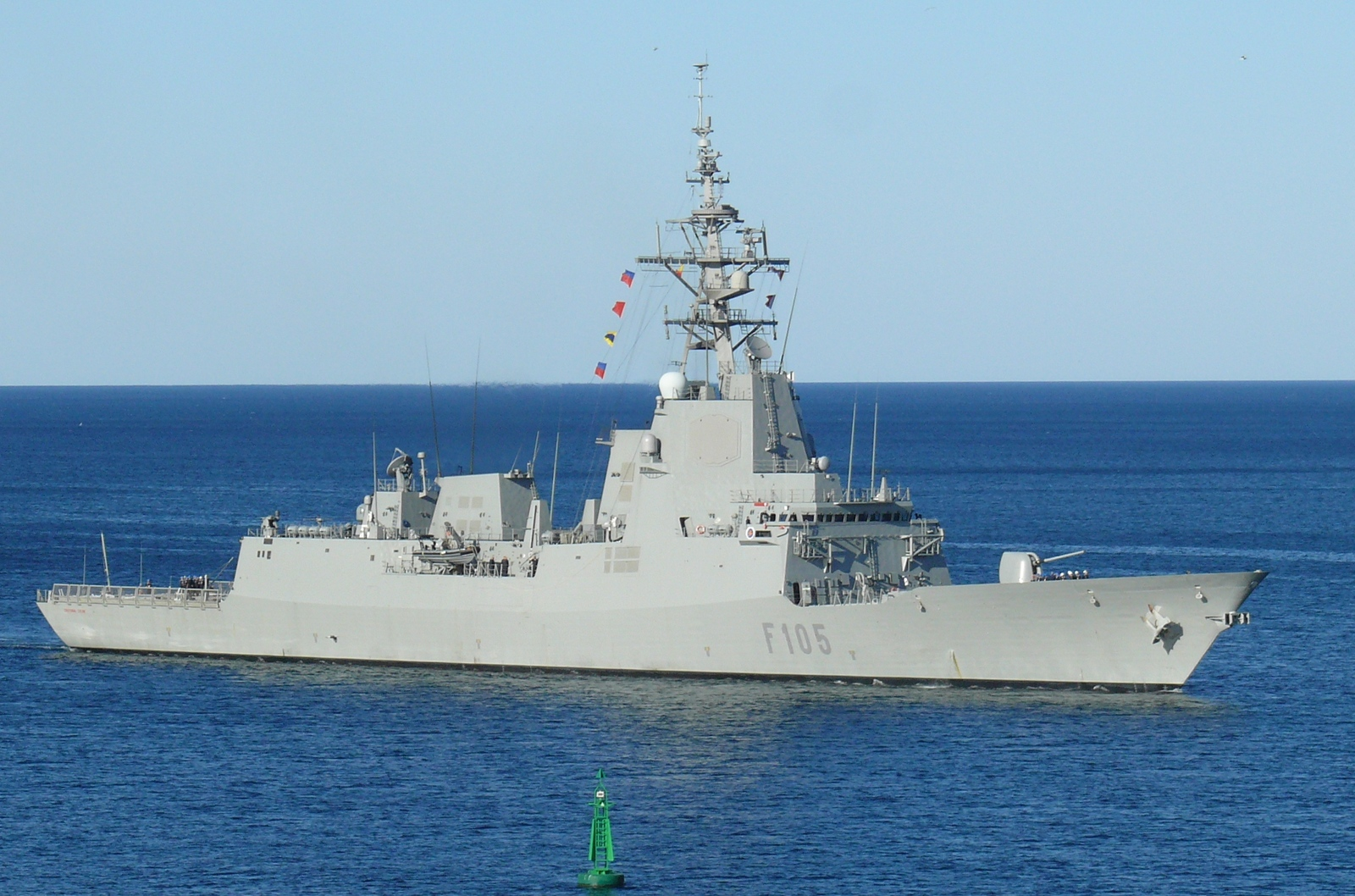
Cristóbal Colón in 2013

Six ships were originally planned, including Roger de Lauria (F105) and Juan de Austria (F106). These were cancelled but a fifth ship was later added as Cristóbal Colón (F105) (It has some improvements compared to the rest of the frigates of its class).

Pennant number	Name	Laid down	Launched	Commissioned	Status
Spanish Navy
F101	Álvaro de Bazán		October 2000	September 2002	Active
F102	Almirante Juan de Borbón	October 2001	28 February 2002	3 December 2003	Active
F103	Blas de Lezo		16 May 2003	16 December 2004	Active
F104	Méndez Núñez	16 May 2003	12 November 2004	21 March 2006	Active
F105	Roger de Lauria renamed Cristóbal Colón	29 June 2007	4 November 2010	23 October 2012	Active
F106	Juan de Austria	Cancelled			
Royal Australian Navy
Hobart class
DDG 39	Hobart	6 September 2012	23 May 2015	23 September 2017	Active
DDG 41	Brisbane	3 February 2014	15 December 2016	27 October 2018	Active
DDG 42	Sydney	19 November 2015	19 May 2018	18 May 2020	Active

== Export ==
=== Australia ===
The class is the basis of the Australian Hobart-class destroyers, also known as the Air Warfare Destroyer. The Australian government announced in June 2007 that, in partnership with Navantia, three F100 vessels were built for the Royal Australian Navy with the first due for delivery in 2014. However, this was delayed until 2017 when lead ship HMAS Hobart was commissioned. All three ships were in service by 2020.

=== Norway ===
The Fridtjof Nansen-class frigate of the Royal Norwegian Navy is based on the Álvaro de Bazán design. Five of these vessels were ordered in 2000. The Norwegian frigates were built by Navantia between 2003 and 2009. Four frigates are still in service.

== See also ==
- List of frigate classes in service
- List of active Spanish Navy ships

Equivalent frigates of the same era

- De Zeven Provinciën class
- Sachsen class
- FREMM
- Iver Huitfeldt class
- Type 054A
- Project 22350
