= Spanish frigate Álvaro de Bazán =

2000 Álvaro de Bazán-class frigate

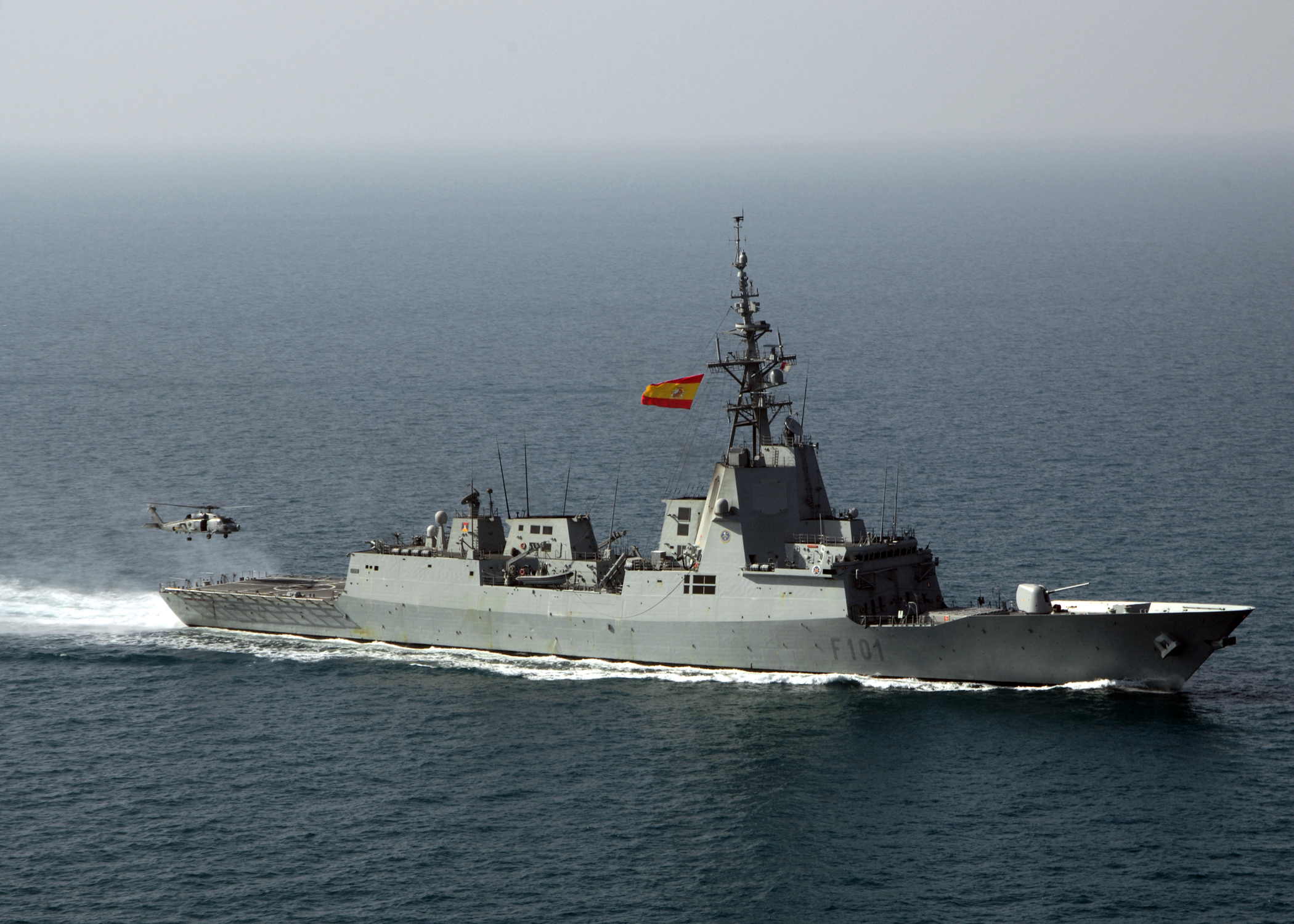
- Álvaro de Bazán underway in December 2005

History

Spain
- Name: Álvaro de Bazán
- Namesake: Álvaro de Bazán
- Builder: NAVANTIA-IZAR, Astillero Ferrol
- Cost: 600 million €
- Identification: pennant number: F101
- Badge

General characteristics
- Class & type: Álvaro de Bazán-class frigate
- Displacement: 5.800 tons full load
- Length: 146.7 m (481.3 ft)
- Beam: 18.6 m (61.0 ft)
- Draft: 8.0 m (26.2 ft)
- Propulsion: CODAG; 2 × General Electric LM2500 gas turbines; 2 × Caterpillar 3600 diesel engines
- Speed: 28.5 knots (52.8 km/h; 32.8 mph)
- Range: 4,500 nautical miles (8,300 km; 5,200 mi)
- Complement: 250 (48 officers)
- Sensors & processing systems: Lockheed Martin AN/SPY-1D 3-D multifunction radar; Raytheon SPS-67(V)4 surface search radar; Raytheon DE1160 LF active and passive sonar; Thales Scout navigation radar; 2 × Raytheon SPG-62 Mk99 radar illuminator; Aegis combat system
- Electronic warfare & decoys: 4 × FMC SRBOC Mk36 flare launchers; SLQ-25A Enhanced Nixie torpedo countermeasures; Indra SLQ-380 EW suite; CESELSA Elnath Mk 9000 interceptor
- Armament: 1 × 5-inch/54 Mk45 Mod 2 gun; Provision for one CIWS FABA 20mm/120 Meroka system.; 1 48 cell Mk 41 vertical launch systems; 32 × Standard SM-2MR Block IIIA; 64 × RIM-162 Evolved Sea Sparrow Missile; 8 × McDonnell Douglas RGM-84 Harpoon anti-shipping missile; 4 × 324 mm Mk32 Mod 9 triple torpedo launchers with 12 Honeywell Mk46 mod 5 torpedo
- Aircraft carried: 1 × Sikorsky SH-60B LAMPS III Seahawk

Álvaro de Bazán is the lead ship of the Álvaro de Bazán class of air defence frigates entering service with the Spanish Navy. She is named after Admiral Álvaro de Bazán.

== Operational history ==
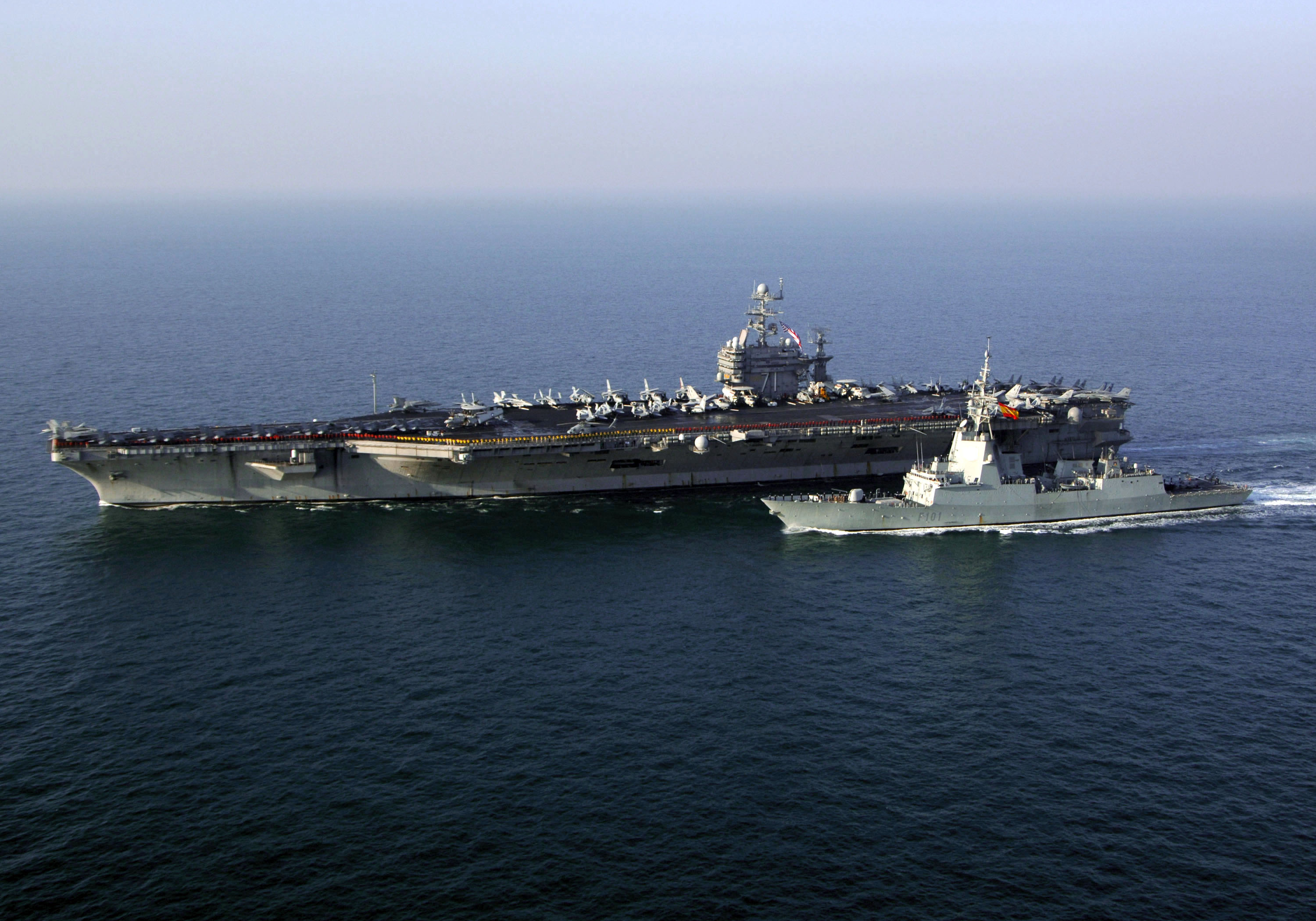
Álvaro de Bazán sails alongside the Nimitz-class aircraft carrier USS Theodore Roosevelt during Álvaro de Bazán's departure from Carrier Strike Group Two

In late 2005, Álvaro de Bazán was deployed as part of the USS Theodore Roosevelt aircraft carrier battle group in the Persian Gulf. This was the first deployment of a Spanish warship as part of an American naval battle group.

In early March 2007, Álvaro de Bazán became the first Spanish warship to visit Australia in 150 years. The deployment included several port visits, and was performed to support Navantia's bid to design the Hobart-class destroyer for the Royal Australian Navy. The ship was also visiting Australia as part of the first circumnavigation of the globe by a Spanish warship in 142 years.
