= Aegis Combat System =

American integrated naval weapons system

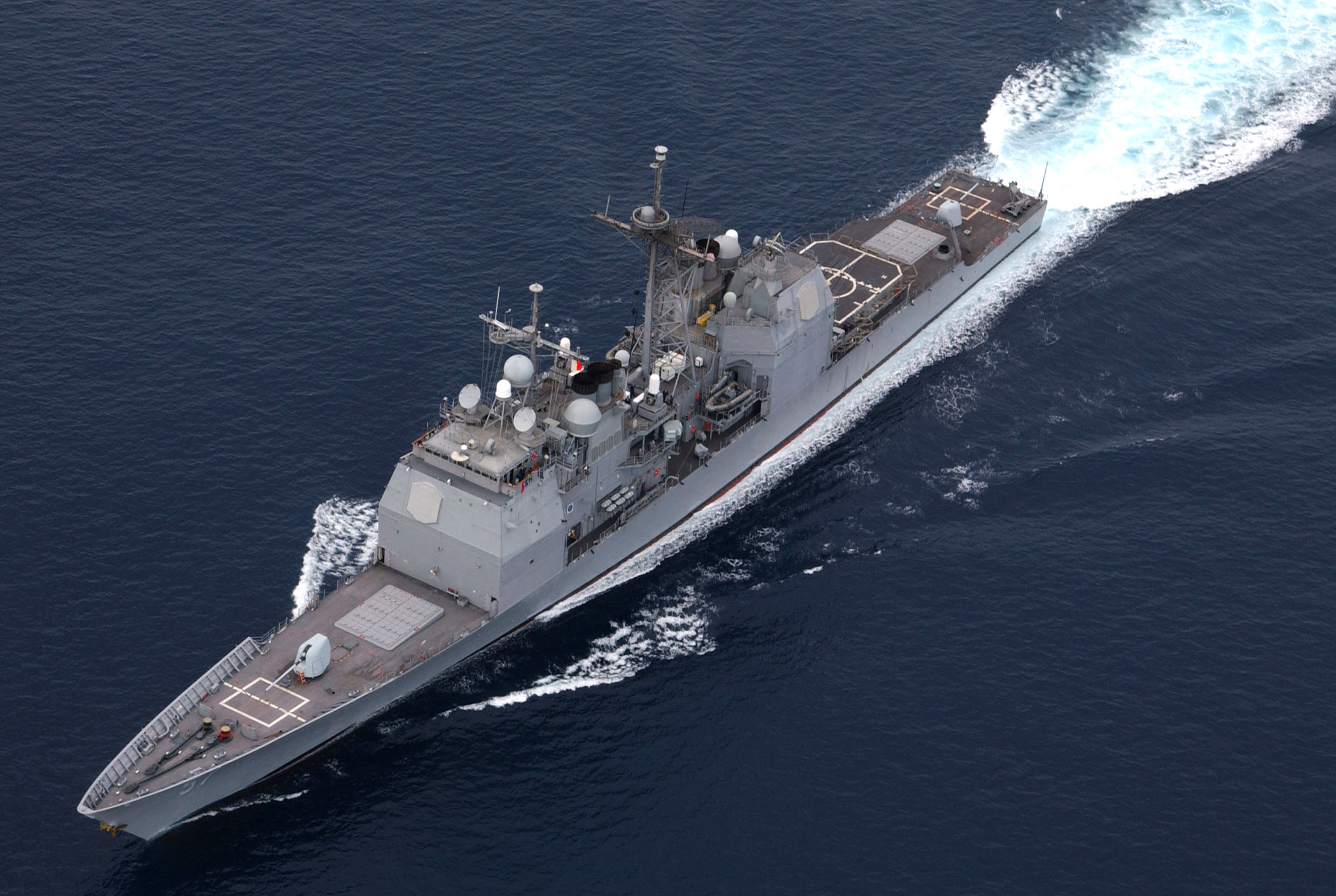
USS Lake Champlain, a Ticonderoga-class Aegis-equipped guided missile cruiser, launched in 1987. Beginning with USS Bunker Hill, this version is equipped with the Mark 41 VLS, whereas earlier versions were equipped with the Mark-26 twin-arm missile launcher system.

The Aegis Combat System is an American integrated naval weapons system, which uses computers and radars to track and guide weapons to destroy enemy targets. It was developed by the Missile and Surface Radar Division of RCA, and it is now produced by Lockheed Martin.

Initially used by the United States Navy, Aegis is now used also by the Japan Maritime Self-Defense Force, Spanish Navy, Royal Norwegian Navy, Republic of Korea Navy, and Royal Australian Navy, and is planned for use by the Royal Canadian Navy. As of 2022, a total of 110 Aegis-equipped ships have been deployed, and 71 more are planned (see operators).

Aegis BMD (Ballistic Missile Defense) capabilities are being developed as part of the NATO missile defense system.

== Etymology ==
The name Aegis derives from the ancient Greek word aiyiç (aigís), which referred to a goatskin and, by extension, the divine protective covering or shield associated with Zeus and Athena. In Greek mythology, the aegis was traditionally associated with Zeus and was also wielded by Athena and Apollo.

== Overview ==
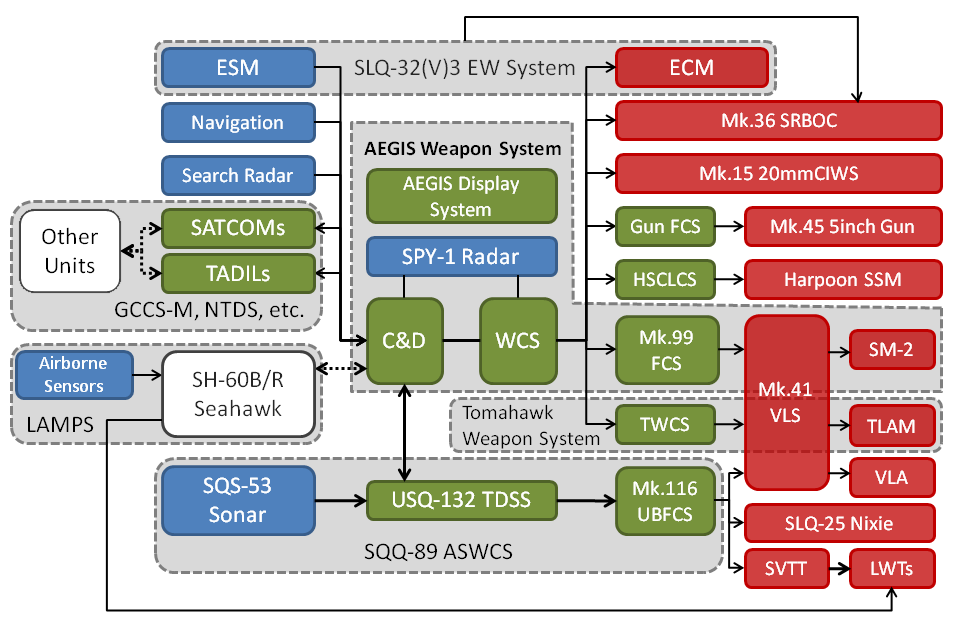
Diagram of the Aegis Combat System (Baseline 2-6)

The Aegis Combat System (ACS) implements advanced command and control (command and decision, or C&D, in Aegis parlance). It is composed of the Aegis Weapon System (AWS), the fast-reaction component of the Aegis Anti-Aircraft Warfare (AAW) capability, along with the Phalanx Close In Weapon System (CIWS), and the Mark 41 Vertical Launch System. Mk 41 VLS is available in different versions that vary in size and weight. There are three lengths: 209 in (5.3 m) for the self-defense version, 266 in (6.8 m) for the tactical version, and 303 in (7.7 m) for the strike version. The empty weight for an 8-cell module is 26,800 lb (12,200 kg) for the self-defense version, 29,800 lb (13,500 kg) for the tactical version, and 32,000 lb (15,000 kg) for the strike version, thus incorporating anti-submarine warfare (ASW) systems and Tomahawk Land Attack Cruise Missiles (TLAM). Shipboard torpedo and naval gunnery systems are also integrated.

AWS, the heart of Aegis, comprises the AN/SPY-1 Radar, MK 99 Fire Control System, Weapon Control System (WCS), the Command and Decision Suite, and Standard Missile family of weapons; these include the basic RIM-66 Standard, the RIM-156 Standard ER extended range missile, and the newer RIM-161 Standard Missile 3 designed to counter ballistic missile threats. A further SM-2 based weapon, the RIM-174 Standard ERAM (Standard Missile 6) was deployed in 2013. Individual ships may not carry all variants. Weapons loads are adjusted to suit assigned mission profile. The Aegis Combat System is controlled by an advanced, automatic detect-and-track, multi-function three-dimensional passive electronically scanned array radar, the AN/SPY-1. Known as "the Shield of the Fleet", the SPY high-powered (6 megawatt) radar is able to perform search, tracking, and missile guidance functions simultaneously with a track capacity of well over 100 targets at more than 100 nautical miles (190 km). However, the AN/SPY-1 Radar is mounted lower than the AN/SPS-49 radar system and so has a reduced radar horizon.

The Aegis system communicates with the Standard missiles through a radio frequency (RF) uplink using the AN/SPY-1 radar for mid-course update missile guidance during engagements, but still requires the AN/SPG-62 fire-control radar for terminal guidance. This means that with proper scheduling of intercepts, a large number of targets can be engaged simultaneously.

The computer-based command-and-decision (C&D) element is the core of the Aegis Combat System and came from the Naval Tactical Data System (NTDS) threat evaluation and weapons assignment (TEWA) function. This interface makes the ACS capable of simultaneous operation against almost all kinds of threats.

In December 2019, Lockheed Martin released a promotional video heralding the 50th anniversary of the Aegis combat system.

The United States Coast Guard's Polar Sentinel-class icebreakers will feature a combat system derived from Aegis. The vessels have been said to include "space, weight, and electrical power set aside to carry offensive weapons".

== Development ==
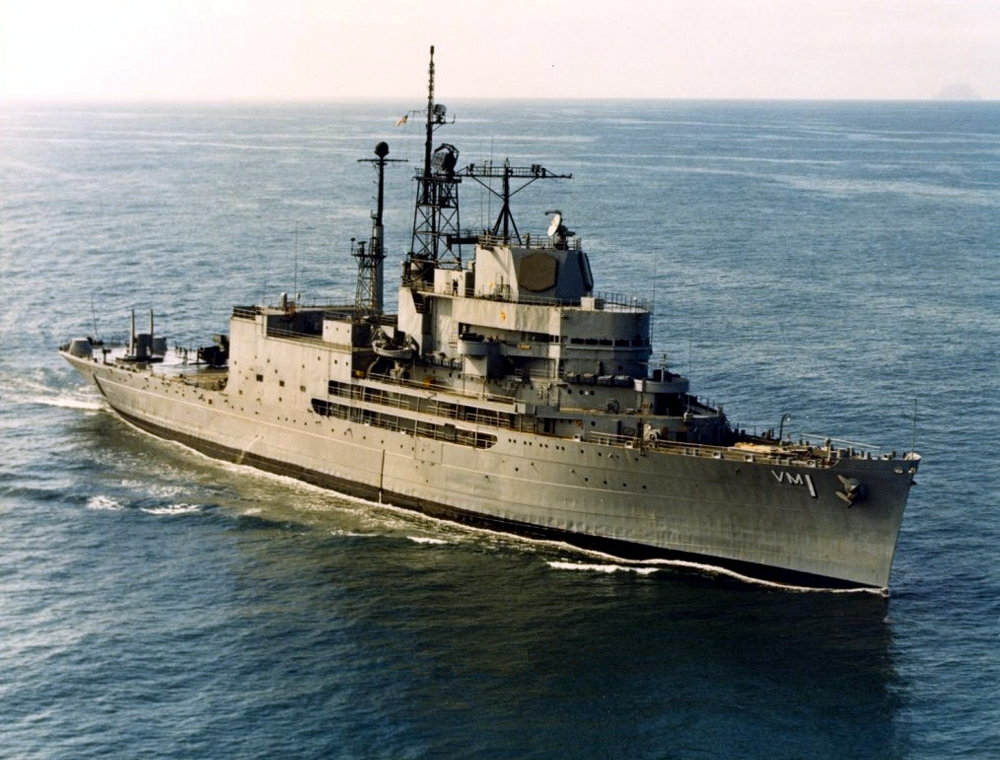
USS Norton Sound in 1980. The installation containing the fixed radar arrays of the AN/SPY-1A system can be seen mounted at the top of the forward superstructure

Aegis was initially developed by the Missile and Surface Radar Division of RCA, which was later acquired by General Electric. The division responsible for the Aegis systems became Government Electronic Systems. This, and other GE Aerospace businesses, were sold to Martin Marietta in 1992. This became part of Lockheed Martin in 1995.

By the late 1950s, the U.S. Navy replaced guns with guided missiles on its ships. These were sufficient weapons but by the late 1960s, the U.S. Navy recognized that reaction time, firepower, and operational availability in all environments did not match the anti-ship missile threat. The new threat of Soviet anti-ship missiles exposed a weakness in contemporary naval radar. The requirements of both tracking and targeting these missiles was limited by the number of radars on each ship, which was typically 2–4. In 1958 the navy started the Typhon Combat System, a prophetic program culminating in the futuristic but unreliable AN/SPG-59 phased array radar, which was never made viable and was cancelled in 1963 to be replaced by the Advanced Surface Missile System (ASMS).

As a result, the U.S. Navy decided to develop a program to defend ships from anti-ship missile threats. An Advanced Surface Missile System (ASMS) was promulgated and an engineering development program was initiated in 1964 to meet the requirements. ASMS was renamed "Aegis" in December 1969 after the aegis, the shield of the Greek god Zeus. The name was suggested by Captain L. J. Stecher, a former Tartar Weapon System manager, after an internal U.S. Navy contest to name the ASMS program was initiated. Captain Stecher also submitted a possible acronym of Advanced Electronic Guided Interceptor System although this definition was never used. The main manufacturer of the Aegis Combat System, Lockheed Martin, makes no mention of the name Aegis being an acronym, nor does the U.S. Navy.

In 1970, then-Captain Wayne Meyer was named Manager Aegis Weapons System. Under his leadership the first systems were successfully deployed on various U.S. Navy vessels.

The first Engineering Development Model (EDM-1) was installed in a test ship, USS Norton Sound, in 1973. During this time frame, the Navy envisioned installing the Aegis Combat System on both a nuclear-powered "strike cruiser" (or CSGN) and a conventionally-powered destroyer (originally designated DDG 47). The CSGN was to be a new, 17,200 ton cruiser design based on the earlier California and Virginia-class cruisers. The Aegis destroyer design would be based on the gas turbine powered Spruance class. When the CSGN was cancelled, the Navy proposed a modified Virginia-class design (CGN 42) with a new superstructure designed for the Aegis Combat System and with a displacement of 12,100 tons. As compared to the CSGN, this design was not as survivable and had reduced command and control facilities for an embarked flag officer. Ultimately this design was also cancelled during the Carter Administration due to its increased cost compared to the non-nuclear DDG 47. With the cancellation of the CGN 42, the DDG 47 Aegis destroyer was redesignated as CG 47, a guided missile cruiser.

The first cruiser of this class was USS Ticonderoga, which used two twin-armed Mark-26 missile launchers, fore and aft. The commissioning of the sixth ship of the class, USS Bunker Hill opened a new era in surface warfare as the first Aegis ship outfitted with the Martin Marietta Mark-41 Vertical Launching System (VLS), allowing a wider missile selection, more firepower, and survivability. The improved AN/SPY-1B radar went to sea in USS Princeton, ushering in another advance in Aegis capabilities. USS Chosin introduced the AN/UYK-43/44 computers, which provide increased processing capabilities.

During 1980, the Arleigh Burke-class destroyer was designed using an improved sea-keeping hull form, reduced infrared and radar cross-sections, and upgrades to the Aegis Combat System. The first ship of the class, USS Arleigh Burke, was commissioned during 1991. A notional design that incorporated the capabilities of a VLS-capable Ticonderoga with a hull and superstructure designed to Arleigh Burke standards, called "Cruiser Baseline", was studied although not built.

Flight II of the Arleigh Burke class, introduced in 1992, incorporated improvements to the SPY-1 radar, and to the Standard missile, active electronic countermeasures, and communications. Flight IIA, introduced in 2000, added a helicopter hangar with one anti-submarine helicopter and one armed attack helicopter. The Aegis program has also projected reducing the cost of each Flight IIA ship by at least $30 million.

Recent Aegis Combat System ships come with active electronically scanned array radars which use solid-state gallium nitride emitters. These include Canadian Surface Combatant (CSC) and Spanish F110-class frigates, which use the AN/SPY-7 radar from Lockheed-Martin, and Constellation-class frigates which use AN/SPY-6 radar from Raytheon. AN/SPY-6 radar will also be installed in Flight III and Flight IIA Arleigh Burke-class destroyers, giving them Ballistic Missile Defense capability currently deployed on Flight I and Flight II ships.

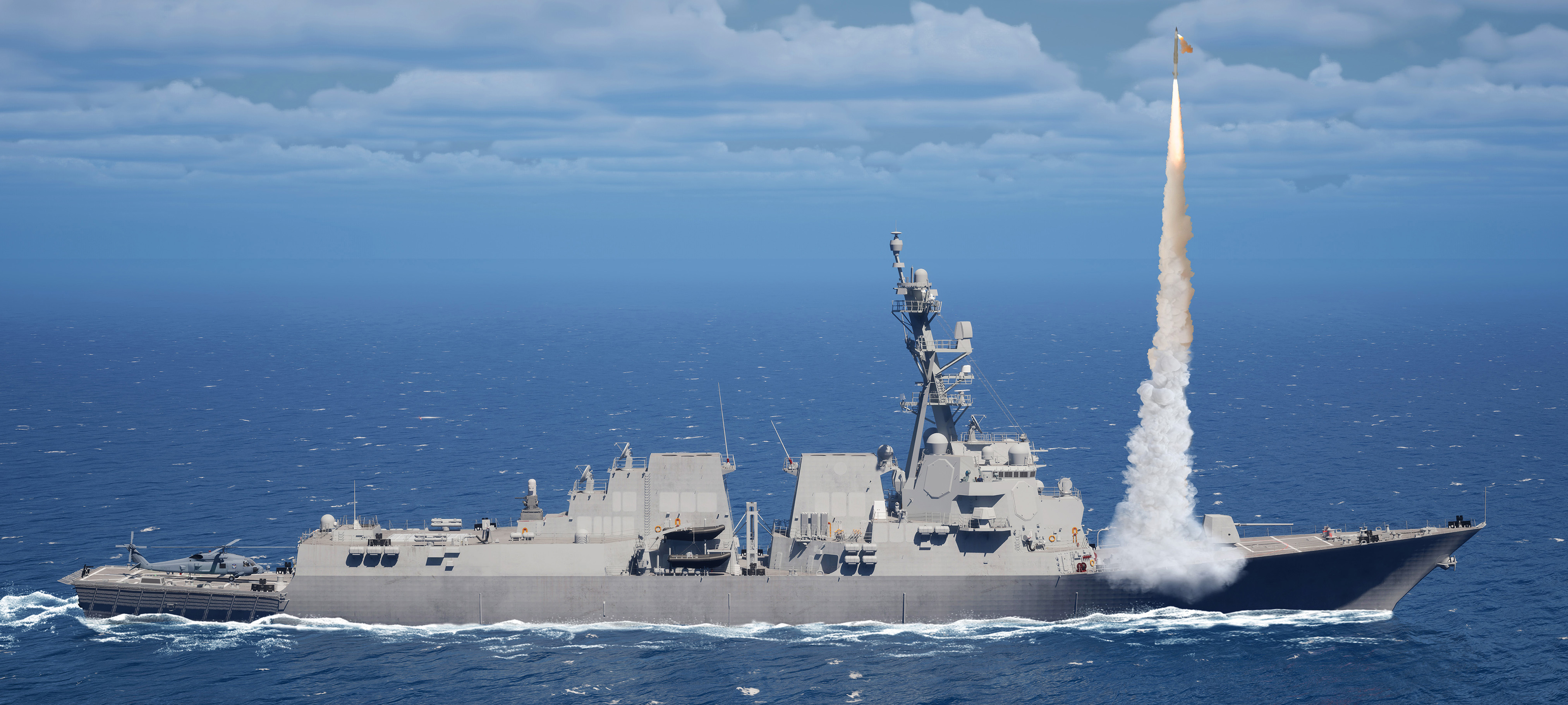
Rendering of the PAC-3 MSE fired from an Arleigh Burke-class destroyer

On April 21, 2026, Lockheed Martin had received a contract from the U.S. government to develop and integrate the PAC-3 MSE into the Aegis Combat System. This allows the Mk 41 VLS to be able to carry and fire such weapons. During the FY 2027, the Navy plans on procuring 405 PAC-3 MSEs for the Arleigh Burke-class destroyer fleet.

== Ballistic missile defense ==
The Aegis Ballistic Missile Defense System (BMD) program by the U.S. Missile Defense Agency enables the Aegis system to act in a sea-based ballistic missile defense function, to counter short- and medium-range ballistic missiles of the variety typically employed by a number of potential opponent states. The program is part of the United States national missile defense strategy and NATO European missile defense system.

BMD capabilities allow vessels equipped with Mk 41 Vertical Launching System (VLS) to intercept ballistic missiles in post-boost phase and prior to reentry, using the RIM-161 Standard Missile 3 (SM-3) mid-course interceptors and the RIM-156 Standard Missile 2 Extended Range Block IV (SM-2ER Block IV) terminal-phase interceptors. The SM-2ER Block IV can engage the ballistic missiles within the atmosphere (i.e. endoatmospheric intercept) in the terminal phase of a missile's trajectory with a blast fragmentation warhead. The Standard Missile 3 is a development of the SM2-ER Block IV, capable of exo-atmospheric intercept (i.e. above the atmosphere) during the midcourse phase; its kinetic warhead (KW) is designed to destroy a ballistic missile's warhead by colliding with it. RIM-174 Standard ERAM (Standard Missile 6) extended range active missile is a further development of the SM-2ER Block IV, which adds a booster and an active radar homing seeker. SM-6 can be used for either air defense or ballistic missile defense, providing extended range and increased firepower; it is not intended to replace the SM-2 series of missiles. The SM-6 Block IB includes a larger 21-inch rocket motor that sits on top of the 21-inch booster.

To enable Ballistic Missile Defense capabilities, signal processing for the SPY-1 radar was upgraded using commercial off-the-shelf components and open architecture standards. The Multi-Mission Signal Processor (MMSP) provides Anti-Air Warfare (AAW) and Ballistic Missile Defense (BMD) capability for the first 28 ships (DDGs 51–78) of the U.S. Navy's Arleigh Burke-class destroyers. This capability is also incorporated in USS John Finn (DDG-113) and following new construction, as well as Aegis Ashore. MMSP modifies transmitters of the SPY-1D radar to enable dual-beam operation for reduced frame times and better reaction time, and provides stability for all waveforms, allowing the radar system to detect, track, and support engagements of a broader range of threats. MMSP improves performance in littoral, ducted clutter, electronic attack (EA), and chaff environments and provides greater commonality in computer programs and equipment.

As of January 2025, the U.S., Japan, and South Korea are the only countries to purchase or deploy the Aegis BMD on their military ships.

Flight III of Arleigh Burke-class destroyers starting with USS Jack H. Lucas are equipped with AN/SPY-6 AESA radar from Raytheon, which is 30 times more sensitive and thus can handle 30 times more targets comparing to the SPY-1D radar, providing increased air and missile defense capabilities. Flight IIA ships will also be upgraded to SPY-6 in the future, giving them Aegis BMD capabilities.

Aegis Ashore is a land-based version of Aegis BMD which includes the AN/SPY-1 radar and command systems, and Mk 41 VLS equipped SM-3 and SM-6 missiles. Test installation exists at the Pacific Missile Range Facility in Hawaii. A site in Deveselu, Romania is operational since 2016, and a site near Redzikowo, Poland will become operational in 2022. Japan intended to deploy two systems with an AN/SPY-7 AESA radar by 2021, but cancelled these plans in 2020. Possible deployments of Aegis Ashore include U.S. naval base at Guam.

U.S. Army Integrated Air and Missile Defense Battle Command System (IBCS) program aims to integrate Aegis BMD and its AN/SPY-1 and AN/SPY-6 radars with MIM-104 Patriot (AN/MPQ-65A and GhostEye), NASAMS (GhostEye MR), AN/TPY-2 (THAAD and GMD), and F-35 Lightning II (AN/APG-81) radars to form a plug and fight network of land, sea, and air-based sensors to help detect and track ballistic missile threats and select Patriot and THAAD surface-to-air launchers that are best positioned for a successful intercept.

In March 2025, the USS Pinckney participated in Flight Test Other-40 (FTX-40), codenamed Stellar Banshee, in which a virtualized SM-6 Block IAU interceptor was tested against a live multi-stage MRBM test target that utilized a new and previously untested type of hypersonic warhead, designated HTV-1. The threat missile was air-launched by parachute drop from a C-17 Globemaster III transport, and was successfully detected and tracked by Pinckney, though no actual physical interceptor missile was fired. The test validated a variety of systems, including modern hypersonic missile tracking satellites, the Block IAU version of SM-6, and the ability of the Aegis Weapon System to track hypersonic targets, and a new type of hypersonic test target. The Missile Defense Agency subsequently announced that a future live intercept of an MRBM with HTV-1 would be designated as Flight Test Aegis Weapon System-43 (FTM-43).

=== NATO European Phased Adaptive Approach ===
On 5 October 2011, U.S. Secretary of Defense Leon Panetta announced that the United States Navy will station four Aegis Ballistic Missile Defense System warships at Naval Station Rota, Spain, to strengthen its presence in the Mediterranean Sea and bolster the ballistic missile defense (BMD) of NATO as part of the European Phased Adaptive Approach (EPAA) missile defense program. On 16 February 2012, it was reported that the Arleigh Burke-class destroyers Donald Cook and Ross would be relocated to Rota during Fiscal Year 2014, followed by Porter and Carney in fiscal year 2015. On 9 May 2013, Commander Destroyer Squadron 60 was formally designated to perform type-command administrative oversight for the four BMD-capable destroyers based at Rota, Spain.

=== JMSDF Aegis Afloat ===
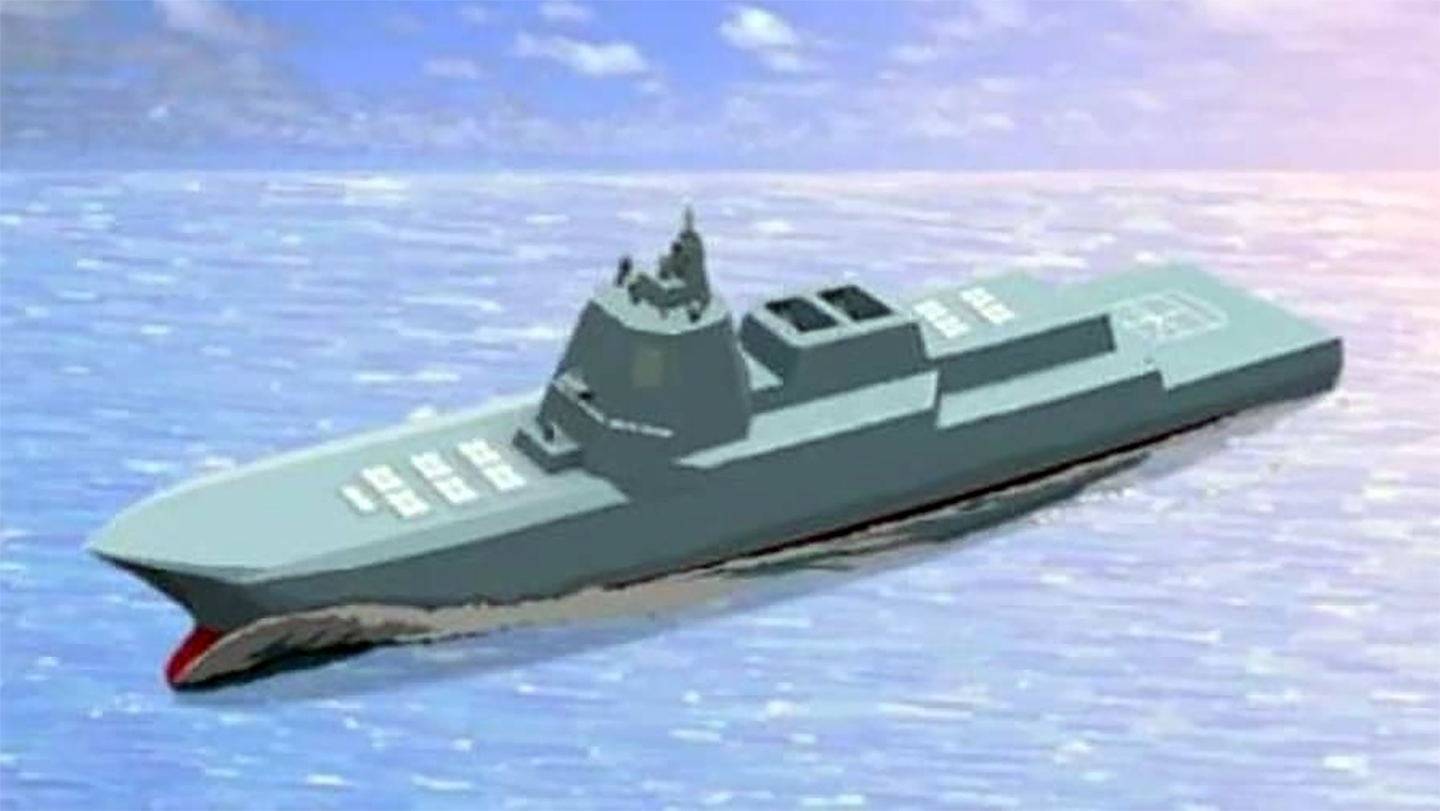
Artist's impression of future BMD ship (JSDF Photo)

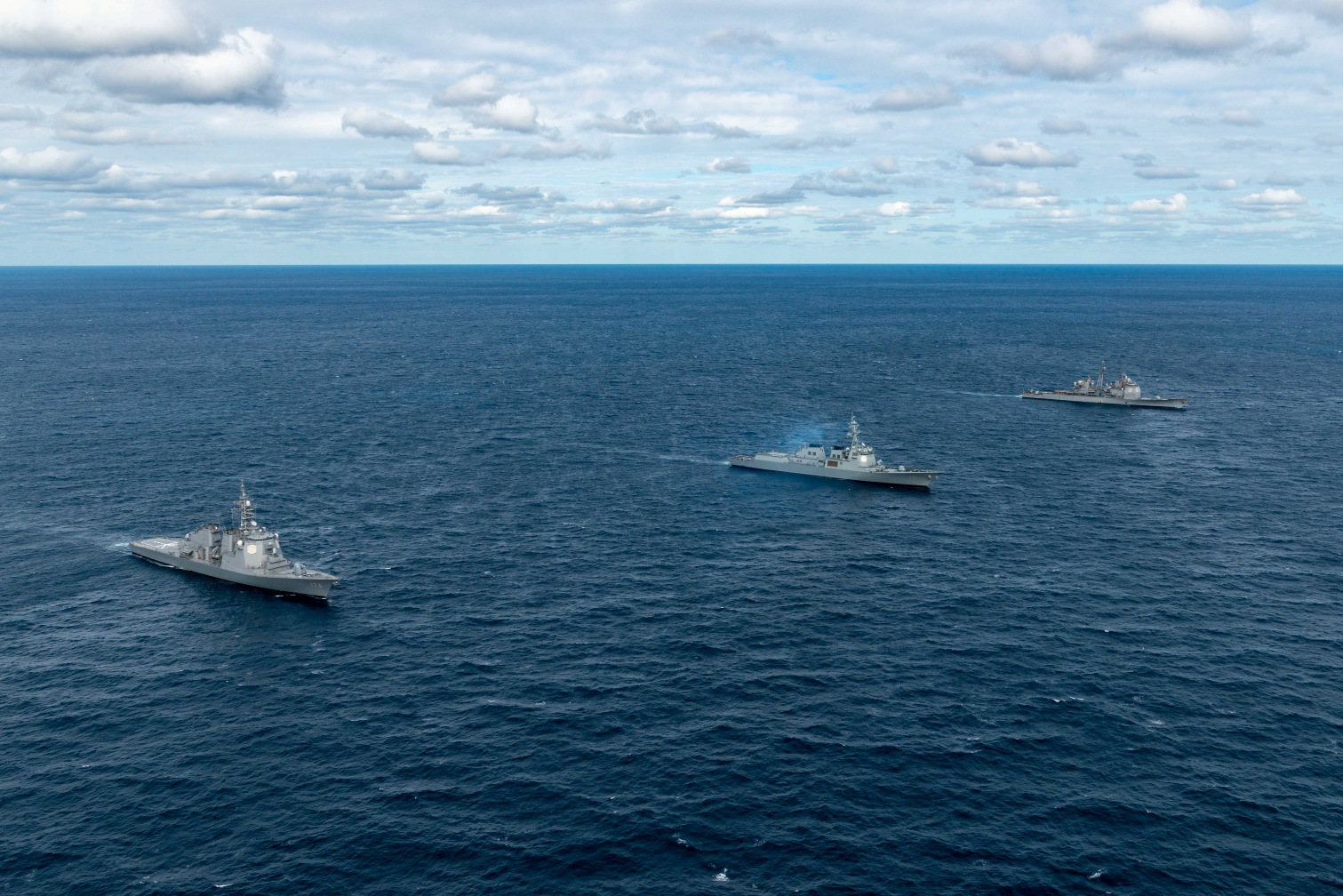
BMD maneuvers (6 October 2022)

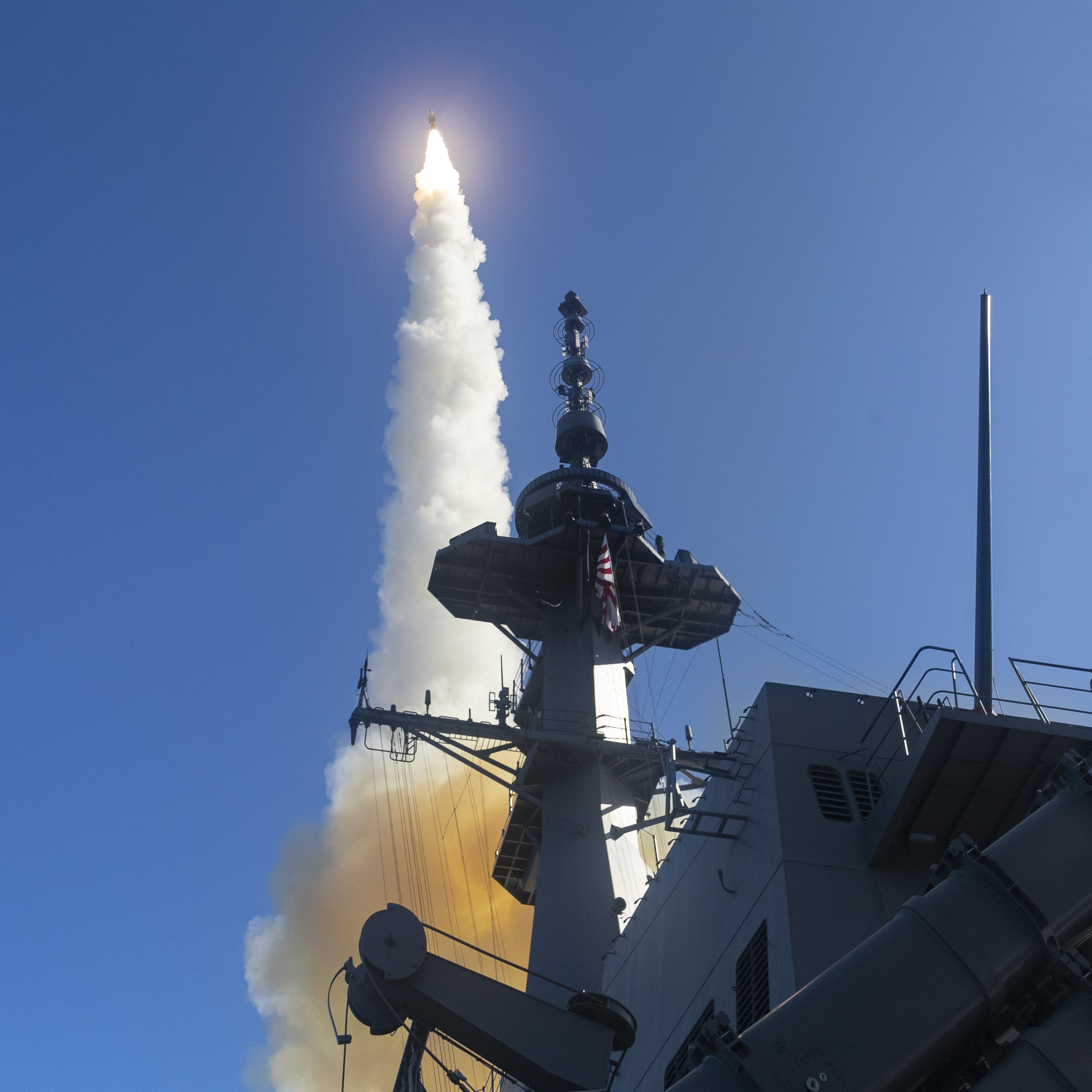
JS Haguro launching SM-3 Block IB missile on 19 November 2022

The Japanese Maritime Self Defense Force (JMSDF) currently operates four Kongō, two Atago, and two Maya-class guided-missile destroyers as part of its "Aegis Afloat" program (See table below).

Additionally, on 31 August 2022, The Japan Ministry of Defense announced that JMSDF will operate two "Aegis system equipped ships" (イージス・システム搭載艦 in Japanese) (pictured) to replace the earlier plan of Aegis Ashore installations, commissioning one by the end of fiscal year 2027, and the other by the end of FY2028. The budget for design and other related expenses are to be submitted in the form of "item requests", without specific amounts, and the initial procurement of the lead items are expected to clear legislation by FY2023. Construction is to begin in the following year of FY2024. At 20,000 tons each, both vessels will be the largest surface combatant warships operated by the JMSDF, and according to Popular Mechanics, they will "arguably [be] the largest deployable surface warships in the world.".

On 6 October 2022, five warships from the United States, Japan, and South Korea held a multilateral ballistic missile defense exercise in the Sea of Japan (pictured) as part of the military response to ongoing North Korean intermediate-range ballistic missile tests over the Japanese home islands.

On 16 November 2022, the guided-missile destroyer Maya fired an SM-3 Block IIA missile, successfully intercepting the target outside the atmosphere in the first launch of the missile from a Japanese warship. On 18 November 2022, the Haguro likewise fired an SM-3 Block IB missile with a successful hit outside the atmosphere (pictured). Both test firings were conducted at the U.S. Pacific Missile Range Facility on Kauaʻi Island, Hawaii, in cooperation with the U.S. Navy and U.S. Missile Defense Agency. This was the first time the two ships conducted SM-3 firings in the same time period, and the tests validated the ballistic missile defense capabilities of Japan's newest Maya-class destroyers.

On 23 December 2022, the Japanese Ministry of Defense's 2023 budget and program guidance illustrated examples of operation (運用の一例) for the Aegis-equipped naval forces of the Japanese Maritime Self Defense Force (MSDF). The two ASEV warship would be exclusively tasked for dedicated ballistic missile defense (BDM) missions (BMD等) and operate off the Korean peninsula in the Sea of Japan, allowing the other Aegis guided-missile destroyers to meet other contingencies (侵攻阻止) while operating independently to maintain the sea lines of communication (SLOC) open in the East China Sea southwest of the Japanese home islands.

On 22 February 2023, five warships from the United States, Japan, and South Korea held a multilateral ballistic missile defense exercise in the Sea of Japan in response to the launch of a North Korean Hwasong-15 ballistic missile on 18 February 2023, landing in Japan's exclusive economic zone (EEZ) in the Sea of Japan, in an area 125 miles west of the island of Ōshima, which lies 30 miles (48 km) west of the main island of Hokkaido. Two additional ICBMs were subsequently launched on 20 February 2023, with both landing in the Sea of Japan off the east coast of the Korean Peninsula. On 19 December 2023, United States, Japan, and South Korea announced the activation of a real-time North Korea missile warning system as well as jointly established a multi-year trilateral exercise plan in response to North Korea's continued ballistic missile launches.

List of JMSSDF Aegis Afloat ships
Name	Hull pennant no.	Builder/shipyard	Aegis radar	Anti-ballistic missile	Vertical launchers	Commissioned	Home port	Flotilla	Squadron	Status
Maya class
JS Maya	DDG-179	JMU, Yokohama	AN/SPY-1D(V)	SM-3 Standard missile	Mark 41: 96 cells (total)	19 March 2020	Yokosuka	Escort Flotilla 1	Escort Squadron 1	Active
JS Haguro	DDG-180	JMU, Yokohama	AN/SPY-1D(V)	SM-3 Standard missile	Mark 41: 96 cells (total)	19 March 2021	Sasebo	Escort Flotilla 4	Escort Squadron 8	Active
Atago class
JDS Atago	DDG-177	JMU, Yokohama	AN/SPY-1D(V)	SM-3 Standard missile	Mark 41: 96 cells (total)	15 March 2007	Maizuru	Escort Flotilla 3	Escort Squadron 3	Active
JDS Ashigara	DDG-178	JMU, Yokohama	AN/SPY-1D(V)	SM-3 Standard missile	Mark 41: 96 cells (total)	13 March 2008	Sasebo	Escort Flotilla 2	Escort Squadron 2	Active
Kongō class
Kongō	DDG-173	Mitsubishi Heavy Industries	AN/SPY-1D PESA	SM-3 Standard missile	Mark 41: 90 cells (total)	25 March 1993	Sasebo	Escort Flotilla 1	Escort Squadron 5:	Active
Kirishima	DDG-174	Mitsubishi Heavy Industries	AN/SPY-1D PESA	SM-3 Standard missile	Mark 41: 90 cells (total)	16 March 1995	Yokosuka	Escort Flotilla 2	Escort Squadron 6	Active
Myōkō	DDG-175	Mitsubishi Heavy Industries	AN/SPY-1D PESA	SM-3 Standard missile	Mark 41: 90 cells (total)	14 March 1996	Maizuru	Escort Flotilla 3	Escort Squadron 3	Active
Chōkai	DDG-176	IHI Corporation	AN/SPY-1D PESA	SM-3 Standard missile	Mark 41: 90 cells (total)	20 March 1998	Sasebo	Escort Flotilla 4	Escort Squadron 8	Active

== System problems ==
In 2010, it was reported that Aegis radar systems on board some individual warships were not being maintained properly. A Navy panel headed by retired Vice Adm. Phillip Balisle issued the "Balisle report," which asserted that over-emphasis on saving money, including cuts in crews and streamlined training and maintenance, led to a drastic decline in readiness, and left Aegis Combat Systems in low state of readiness.

=== Iran Air Flight 655 ===
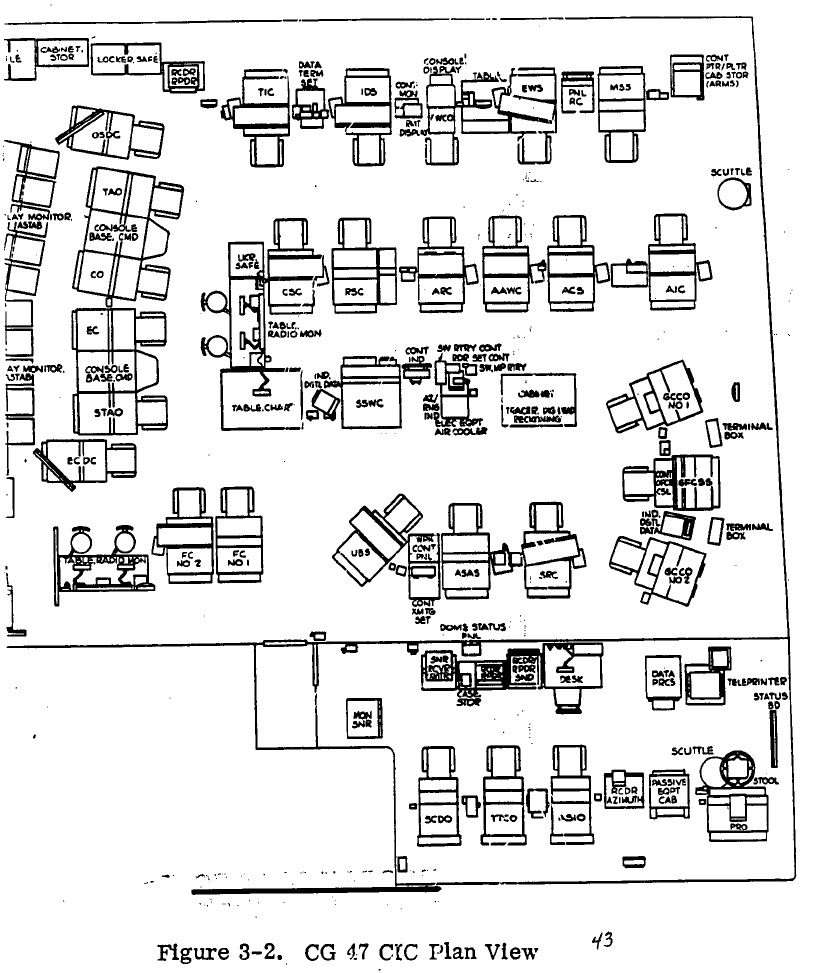
Layout of the Combat Information Center of early Aegis cruisers

The Aegis system was involved in a disaster in which USS Vincennes mistakenly shot down Iran Air Flight 655 in 1988 resulting in 290 civilian deaths.

A formal military investigation by the United States Navy concluded that the Aegis system was completely operational and well maintained. The investigation found that if the commanding officer had relied on the complete tactical data displayed by the Aegis system, the engagement might never have occurred. Additionally, psychological effects of the crew subconsciously manipulating the data to accord with a predefined scenario greatly contributed to the false identification. The investigation found that the Aegis Combat System did not contribute to the incident and that the system's recorded target data contributed to the investigation of the incident. The discrepancies between the Aegis data report and what the ship's personnel reported to the commanding officer are as follows:

Aegis Data Report	Personnel Report to CO
Iran Air Flight 655 continuously ascended in duration of flight	Iran Air Flight 655, after attaining 9,000 to 12,000 ft (2,700 to 3,700 m), reportedly descended on an attack vector on USS Vincennes
Iran Air Flight 655 continuously squawked Mode III identification, friend or foe (IFF) in duration of flight	Iran Air Flight 655 reportedly squawked Iranian F-14 Tomcat on Mode II IFF for a moment; personnel proceeded to re-label the target from "Unknown Assumed Enemy" to "F-14"
Iran Air Flight 655 held consistent climb speed in duration of flight	Iran Air Flight 655 was reported to increase in speed to an attack vector similar to an F-14 Tomcat

Other analyses found that ineffective user interface design caused poor integration with the crisis management human processes it was intended to facilitate. The Aegis System software shuffles target tracking numbers as it gathers additional data. When the captain asked for a status of the original target identifier TN4474, the Aegis system had recycled that identifier to a different target which was descending, indicating possible attack posture. An article by David Pogue in Scientific American rated it as one of the five "worst digital user-interface debacles of all time."

=== 2024 F/A-18F shootdown ===
On December 22, 2024 USS Gettysburg (CG-64) shot down an F/A-18F Super Hornet belonging to Strike Fighter Squadron 11 (VFA-11) and flying off USS Harry S. Truman (CVN-75). USCENTCOM stated that both the pilot and weapon systems officer ejected and were recovered safely shortly after, with only one receiving minor injuries after an initial assessment. Gettysburg also fired on a second F/A-18 and missed by ~100 feet. The missile missed thanks to the pilot performing evasive maneuvers. Investigation on these incidents are in progress, as of January 2025.

== Operators ==
Country	Ship class	Active	Planned	Retired	Lost
Royal Australian Navy	Hunter-class frigate (Type 26)		6		
Royal Australian Navy	Hobart-class destroyer	3			
Royal Canadian Navy	River-class destroyer (Type 26)		15		
German Navy	Type F127 frigate		5		
Japan Maritime Self-Defense Force	Aegis System Equipped Vessel (ASEV)		2		
Japan Maritime Self-Defense Force	Maya-class destroyer	2			
Japan Maritime Self-Defense Force	Atago-class destroyer	2			
Japan Maritime Self-Defense Force	Kongō-class destroyer	4			
Republic of Korea Navy	Sejong the Great-class destroyer	4	2		
Royal Norwegian Navy	Fridtjof Nansen-class frigate	4			1
Spanish Navy	Bonifaz-class frigate		5		
Spanish Navy	Álvaro de Bazán-class frigate	5			
United States Navy	Constellation-class frigate		2		
United States Navy	Arleigh Burke-class destroyer	74	19		
United States Navy	Ticonderoga-class cruiser	5		22	
Total		106	56	22	1

- The Royal Australian Navy commissioned three Hobart-class destroyers which have Aegis as the core of their combat systems, with the last entering service in 2020. The Australian Government announced that the class of nine Hunter-class frigates to be built in the next decade will also be Aegis equipped, but with a tactical interface developed by Saab Australia. The number of Hunter-class frigates were reduced to 6 following the Australian government's Enhanced Lethality Surface Combatant Fleet program.
- The Royal Canadian Navy has awarded Lockheed Martin Canada building 15 River-class destroyers. The ships will be equipped with the AN/SPY-7(V)1 solid state radar and the International Aegis Fire Control Loop (IAFCL) is integrated with Canada's combat management system, CMS 330, developed by Lockheed Martin Canada for the Royal Canadian Navy's Halifax-class ships. The program will make Canada the owner of the world's second largest Aegis fleet.
- The German Navy has plans to acquire Aegis system equipped ships in the form of the Type F127 class frigates. In a similar fashion to the Canadian River-class destroyers, these ships will be equipped with the AN/SPY-6 and the International Aegis Fire Control Loop (IAFCL) is integrated with the CMS 330 combat management system developed by Lockheed Martin Canada. An agreement was signed in December 2025 between Lockheed Martin Canada and Hensoldt to develop the new German command system later planned on all the combat ships.
- The Japanese Maritime Self-Defense Force operates eight Aegis ships comprising the four Kongō-class destroyers that entered service from 1993 and two improved units known as the Atago class from 2007. Two further improved units known as the Maya class were ordered with the first being commissioned in 2020 and the second in 2021.
- The Royal Norwegian Navy has acquired five Spanish-built Fridtjof Nansen-class frigates equipped with the Aegis system, with the first, HNoMS Fridtjof Nansen entering service in 2006 and the last, HNoMS Thor Heyerdahl, in 2011. One, HNoMS Helge Ingstad was sunk after colliding with an oil tanker. After being raised, it was thought that repairing the ship was too costly and so it was decided to scrap the ship.
- Republic of Korea Navy currently operates 4 Sejong the Great-class destroyers, with the lead ship commissioned in 2008. 2 further vessels have been ordered. The three earlier "Batch I" vessels use Aegis Baseline 7. The three latter "Batch II" vessels use Aegis Baseline 9, which allows the radar to be used for air warfare and BMD at the same time.
- The Spanish Navy is currently operating five F100 Álvaro de Bazán-class Aegis frigates, and starting in 2026, it will operate the F110-class frigate as well. The F-110 class will incorporate the International Aegis Fire Control Loop (IAFCL) integrated with SCOMBA, the national combat system developed by Navantia.
- The U.S. Navy currently operates the Aegis equipped Ticonderoga-class cruisers and Arleigh Burke-class destroyers and has ordered more of the latter.

== See also ==
- Wayne E. Meyer
- Aegis Ballistic Missile Defense System – (United States)
- PAAMS – (United Kingdom, France, Italy)
- Typhon Combat System – (United States)
