= F110 =

F110, F.110 or F-110 may refer to:

- F-110 Spectre, the original United States Air Force designation of the McDonnell Douglas F-4 Phantom II aircraft
- General Electric F110, a jet engine
- a model of truck in the Ford F-Series
- F110 class frigate, a class of frigates under development for the Spanish Navy
