= W60 =

W60 may refer to:

- W60 (nuclear warhead)
- Hario W60, a coffee filter
- PENTAX Optio W60, a digital camera
- Sakkuru Station, in Hokkaido, Japan
- Whitbread 60, a class of racing yachts
- W60, a classification in masters athletics
