= Track-via-missile =

Missile guidance technique

Track-via-missile or TVM refers to a missile guidance technique which combines features of semi-active radar homing (SARH) and radio command guidance. This avoids the problems with terminal accuracy normally seen by command guided missiles, especially at long range. It has been used on a number of long-range surface-to-air missiles (SAMs) including the MIM-104 Patriot.

== Explanation ==
Command guidance has the advantage of isolating most of the equipment for the missile guidance at the launcher, where size and weight are significantly less important. In these systems, the radar that provides guidance is on the ground or ship and the missile lacks an independent guidance system. Typically two radars are used, one tracking the target and another the missile, so that they can fly independent and widely separated paths. A computer then calculates the position and velocity of the two and calculates an intercept point. The same computer then calculates the control inputs needed to fly the missile to that point and sends any required corrections to the missile via a radio signal, often using the radar tracking the missile as the radio signal.

As this system is simple to build, it was used as the basis for many early surface-to-air missile (SAM) systems. However, it has a significant drawback, especially for long-range fire. Radar signals spread out in space, similar to the cone-like beam of a flashlight, with typical beam spreads on the order of around 5 degrees. This means that at longer ranges, the target's location is only known within a gross value, perhaps on the order of several kilometers. Various signal encoding techniques can be used to narrow this down to something on the order of 0.1 degrees, but at long range, this still provides accuracy only on the order of hundreds of meters. This inaccuracy demands a huge warhead to ensure the destruction of the target.

This problem is avoided in the semi-active radar homing (SARH) concept. In these systems, the ground station still illuminates the target with its radar, but the receiver is on the missile. The reflection of the original signal off the target produces another cone-like beam, but one that is narrowest at the target. The receiver on the missile uses this signal to guide on, thus becoming increasingly accurate as it flies toward the target. There are a number of minor issues that result in a maximum accuracy (for early designs) on the order of tens of meters, but this is independent of range. This means SARH missiles can have much smaller warheads with the same overall effectiveness, although at the cost of having additional electronics on the missile.

The downside to the SARH approach is that the signal provided by the ground radar has to contain some form of additional encoding of the signal for the missile to determine the direction of the target within the cone-shaped signal it sees. Normally this is accomplished using a form of conical scanning which uses the timing of variations in the signal to determine the angle within the cone, but this demands that the signal is continuous, or "locked on". This is normally accomplished with SAMs by using a separate target illumination radar dedicated to this task.

In both cases, SAMs required separate radars for each missile being guided, which means that the system as a whole can only guide the number of missiles that it has radars. For SAMs in high-traffic environments, especially ships facing salvos of anti-ship missiles, it is possible to overwhelm the system's capabilities. In theory, the missile can add electronics to allow it to continue tracking a non-continuous signal and thus allow a single radar to provide tracking to several missiles, but using electronics of the 1950s and 60s this would be prohibitively expensive and large; even command guided systems generally lacked this capability. Addressing this was a major concern, especially for the US Navy and Royal Navy.

Track-via-missile combines these two concepts to avoid the problems of both. Like SARH, the receiver is placed on the missile and thus has increased accuracy as it approaches the target. Instead of processing it locally, the signal is instead rebroadcast on another frequency and received by the launcher. The launcher then compares the signal it sent to the one received by the missile, and through this comparison can perform the determination of the target location relative to the missile. But because the ground station knows the rough location of the target, and details of the original signal it sent, it does not require the signal to be continual and thus does not demand a separate illumination radar. After comparison and calculation, updates are sent to the missile as in the command-guided case using a data link.

TVM solves the accuracy problem of command guidance, but not the issue of requiring separate radars. In theory, this can be solved by placing the required electronics on the missile, but doing so using 1950s technology would lead to very large size and make the missile cost very high. Centralizing this at the launcher site is a much more tractable problem, especially after the introduction of military-grade transistors in the later 1950s. This led to the US Navy's RIM-50 Typhon missile and associated AN/SPG-59 radar, which had a single PESA radar and could salvo many missiles. Development problems led to its cancellation.

One additional advantage of TVM is that, as there is no tracking radar, there is nothing to indicate to the target that it is being tracked. This is normally a relatively simple task for a radar warning receiver that gives the target a warning that it should employ countermeasures, but in the TVM case the search radar signal is all that is needed and it does not change when the missile is launched.

== Advantages ==
- Unlike an active radar homing missile, the missile does not alert the target to the fact that it is homing in on it by illuminating it with radio waves. Typically, the target will be aware that it is being illuminated by the SAM radar, but it will not know for certain if it has been engaged. Modern phased-array radars, by virtue of their thin beams and low sidelobes make detection by the aircraft even more difficult.
- Unlike semi-active radar homing missiles, the electronics needed to calculate and follow an interception path do not need to be built into each missile, reducing their complexity, weight and cost. It is also possible to make the missiles more accurate by using more sophisticated algorithms for calculating interception than would be possible in the limited processor in a missile. In addition, it is possible for operators to adjust the missile's flight path throughout the engagement, even during the terminal homing phase.
- Unlike radio command guided missiles, because the missile's radar receiver is much closer to the target than the ground station, more accurate tracking information can be generated for the system's computer. It is also more difficult to jam or spoof the tracking signal.

It is also possible for the ground station to receive direct radar reflections from the target (rather than the data downloaded by the missile) and combine the two sources of information to generate the interception course. This adds an extra element of Electronic countermeasures resistance to the system.

== Disadvantages ==
TVM also has some disadvantages. For example, the data link could potentially be jammed, which is not possible with an active homing or “fire and forget” missile. Additionally, this technique requires the ground-based radar to be active throughout the engagement, potentially aiding aircraft equipped with anti-radiation missiles as they attempt to detect and engage the SAM radar. Another potential disadvantage compared to active radar homing is that the missile must rely on the ground-based radar for guidance, so if the target is able to put an obstacle between itself and the fixed radar system (e.g. a hill), or if it manages to get outside of the radar's tracking envelope (e.g., fly outside of the tracking “fan” of a PATRIOT radar, or fly outside the effective range of another system) then the missile will not be able to detect reflected radiation from the target and thus will be unable to continue the engagement.

== Examples ==
Most very modern long-range SAM systems use the track-via-missile technique. This includes:

- The Chinese HQ-9 medium- to long-range, semi-active radar homing missile.
- The U.S. MIM-104 Patriot surface to air missile system.
