= SCOMBA =

Spanish naval combat system

SCOMBA (Spanish: Sistema de Combate de los Buques de la Armada; meaning "Spanish Navy's ship's combat system") is a unified combat system that is equipped to the majority of Spanish naval vessels since 2010. It is a variant of the Aegis combat system.

== History ==
SCOMBA is a Spanish national version of the Aegis combat system evolved from a technology transfer, including lines of source code included in the Álvaro de Bazán-class frigate program, this includes commonality with the C&D (Command and Decision) and ADS (Aegis Display System) of the US Navy version, with the aim of unifying in a common core all future Spanish Navy combat systems sharing source code, specifications, interface, equipment and training all without an external support.

== General characteristics ==
The hardware is composed of two redundant ARES processing units, a variable amount of CONAM terminals, two or three monitors, a digital video TV and radar server (SD2V), a variable amount of large display screens linked to a wide range of sensors. During the development of SCOMBA the following sensors where integrated among others:

- LANZA-N radar from Indra Sistemas.
- ARIES radar from Indra.
- IFF with mode 5 and mode S.
- PAR Approach radar (based on the ARIES radar).
- DORNA naval radar and optronic fire direction developed by Navantia.
- RIGEL countermeasure suite.
- AIS as a sensor of the combat system.
- LINPRO processor built by Tecnobit, with a common type N interface.
- Amphibious assault craft control system.
- Integration with a common maps archive.
- NTP synchronization.
