= USS Norton Sound =

Tender of the United States Navy

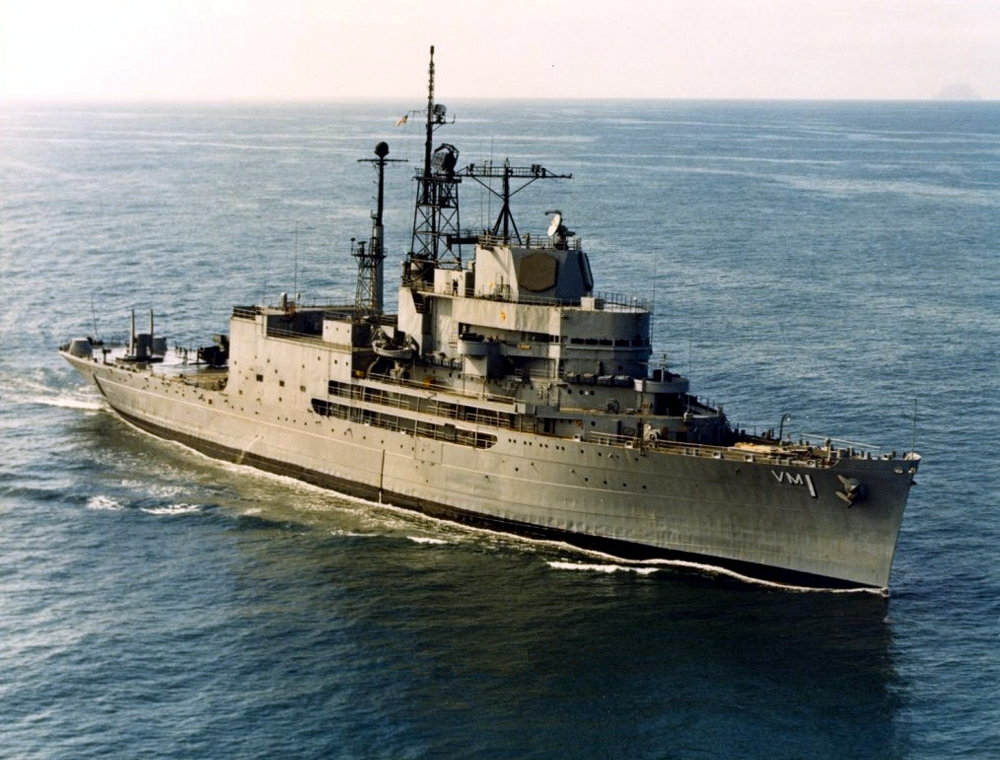
- USS Norton Sound (AVM-1) ca. 1980 with the AN/SPY-1A Aegis Combat Information System radars atop the superstructure

History

United States
- Name: Norton Sound
- Namesake: Norton Sound
- Builder: Los Angeles Shipbuilding and Dry Dock Company, San Pedro, California
- Laid down: 7 September 1942
- Launched: 28 November 1943
- Commissioned: 8 January 1945
- Decommissioned: 10 August 1962; 11 December 1986
- Reclassified: AVM-1, 8 August 1951
- Stricken: 26 January 1987
- Fate: Disposed of by Maritime Administration exchange, 20 October 1988

General characteristics
- Class & type: Currituck-class seaplane tender
- Displacement: 14,000 tons, full load
- Length: 540 ft 5 in (164.72 m)
- Beam: 69 ft 3 in (21.11 m)
- Draft: 22 ft 3 in (6.78 m)
- Propulsion: steam turbines, 4 x boilers, 2 x shafts, 12,000 shp (9.0 MW)
- Speed: 18 knots (33 km/h)
- Complement: 1,247 as commissioned, 540 after conversion to AVM-1
- Sensors & processing systems: Various, including testing of AN/SPG-59, AN/SPY-1 and AN/SPQ-9
- Armament: Varied over her career, especially as a test vessel

USS Norton Sound (AV-11/AVM-1) was originally built as a Currituck-class seaplane tender by Los Angeles Shipbuilding and Dry Dock Company, San Pedro, California. She was named for Norton Sound, a large inlet in West Alaska, between the Seward Peninsula and the mouths of the Yukon, north-east of the Bering Sea.

== Career ==
Norton Sound was laid down 7 September 1942 and launched 28 November 1943. The ship was sponsored by Mrs. Ernest L. Gunther, wife of Rear Admiral Ernest L. Gunther, and commissioned 8 January 1945.

=== World War II ===
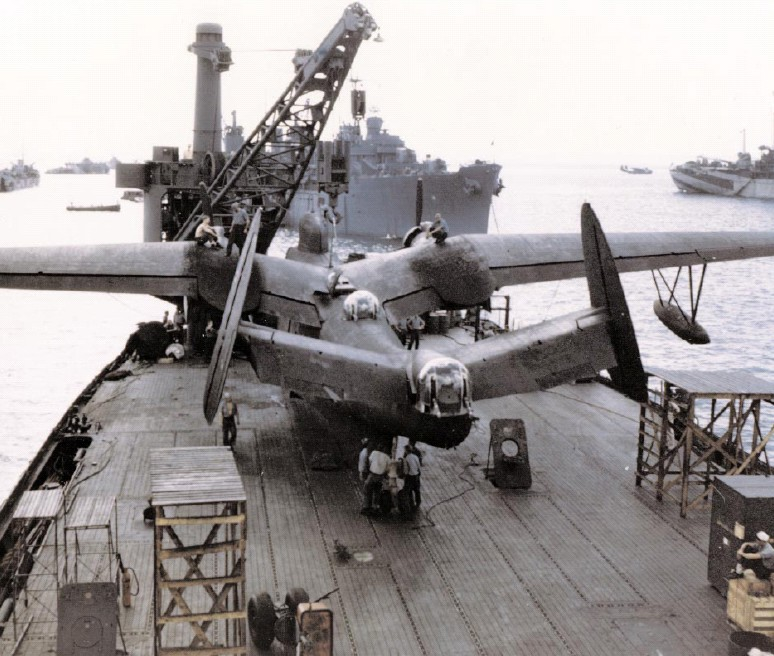
A PBM-5 on the deck of USS Norton Sound in April 1945 off Saipan

After its shakedown in the Pacific, the new seaplane tender stood out from San Diego 26 February 1945 and steamed for Pearl Harbor, Hawaii. She reported to Commander, Marshall-Gilbert area for training in mid-March, and she arrived Saipan 1 April 1945 to provide seaplane tending services.

==== Okinawa campaign ====
Norton Sound anchored 1 May 1945 at Aka Kaikyo, Kerama Retto, and by 21 June 1945 had assisted in downing three hostile air raiders. Air alerts continued until midnight, 14 August 1945. Word of the Japanese surrender arrived eight hours later, and into September the tender engaged in upkeep and air operations at Okinawa.

==== Postwar occupation duties ====
She steamed for Sasebo, Japan 21 September 1945, returning to Okinawa one week later. Norton Sound called at Shanghai, China 1 October 1945, and by the 23rd of that month she was at Tsingtao, where she tended seaplanes until 7 November 1945. The next day she anchored at Shanghai, and from then until April 1946, she remained on duty with the occupation forces between China and Japan.

Norton Sound departed Tokyo Bay 7 April 1946 for Norfolk, Virginia. After overhaul there she joined the Atlantic Fleet. She operated off the east coast until October 1947, when she steamed for San Diego to rejoin the Pacific Fleet.

Norton Sound received two battle stars for World War II service.

=== 1948 to 1950 ===
Later Norton Sound was converted to a missile-launching platform. She was in Philadelphia Naval Shipyard in 1948 for seven months while equipment was installed for handling, stowing, launching, and controlling guided missiles.

Upon completion of her modifications in October 1948, Norton Sound steamed for her new homeport of Port Hueneme, California. En route she conducted tests with Skyhook balloons. Off the coast of Southern California she underwent a missile training program. Late that Autumn Norton Sound launched a training missile, marking the beginning of the Navy's use of shipborne guided missiles.

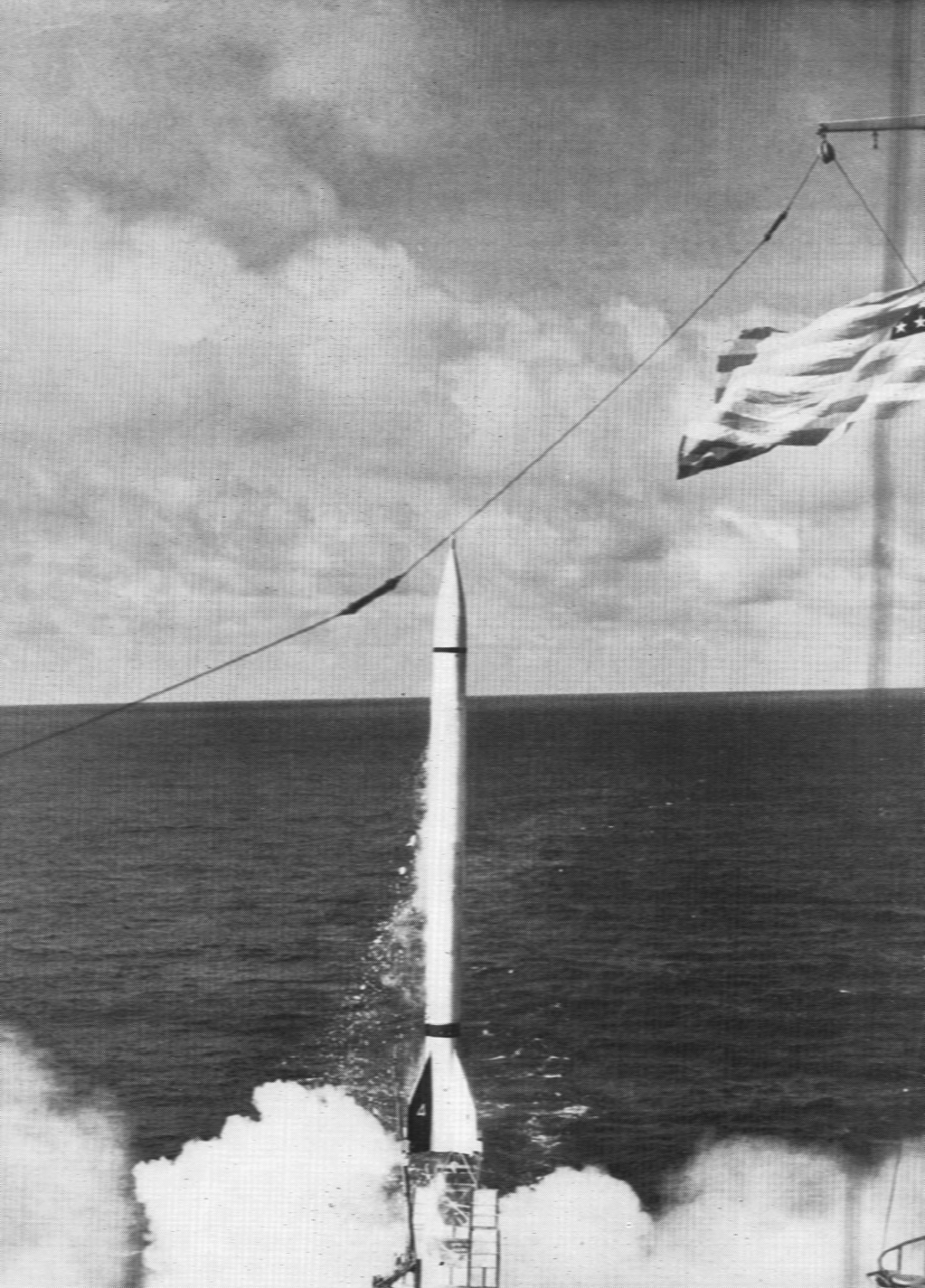
Launch of Viking 4 from USS Norton Sound, 1950

After launching equipment for Aerobee rockets was installed at Long Beach Naval Shipyard in February 1949, she steamed to equatorial waters off the South American coast and launched two Aerobees. These launchings provided information on the earth's radiation belt.

On 1 July 1949, Norton Sound headed for the geomagnetic equator 1,500 miles (2,400 km) south of Hawaii, and conducted tests with seventeen Skyhook balloons and nine smaller balloon clusters, all carrying scientific instrumentation packages.

After modifications in February and March 1950 at San Francisco Naval Shipyard, Norton Sound launched a five-ton Viking rocket 11 May in Project Reach. This rocket carried a 500-pound instrumentation package to an altitude of 106.4 miles (171 km), and provided data on cosmic rays. Project Reach concluded the first phase of Norton Sound's use as a missile platform.

=== 1950 to 1962 ===
==== Terrier and Tartar missile tests ====
In the fall of 1950, Norton Sound underwent a four-month overhaul at San Francisco Naval Shipyard. New Terrier missile handling, launching, stowage, and guidance systems were installed, and she was reclassified from "AV-11" to "AVM-1" on 8 August 1951. This was the first of three extensive alterations accomplished through 1955. Test launchings of Terrier and Tartar missiles continued through 1958.

==== Operation Argus nuclear tests ====
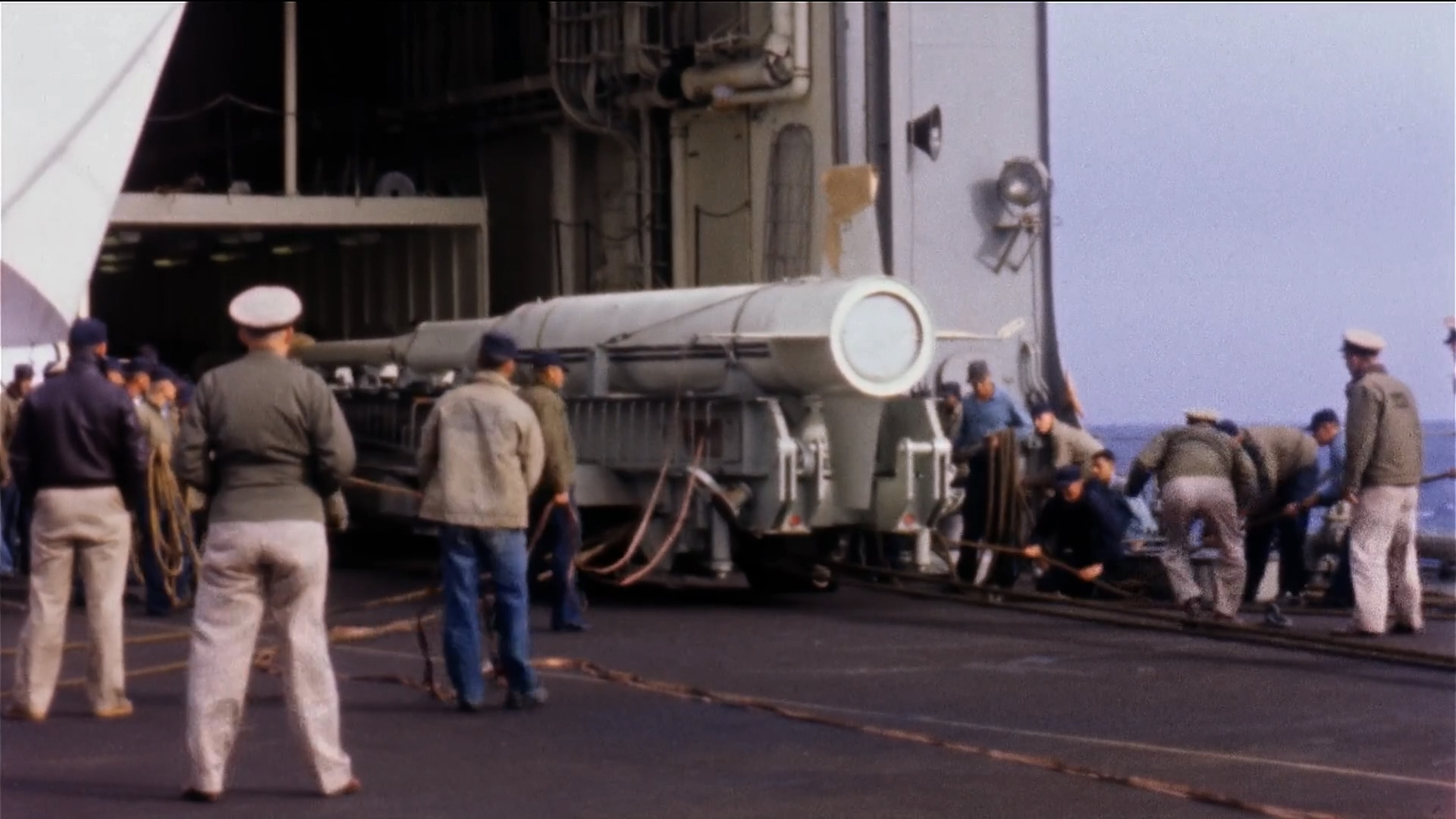
Deployment of X-17A aboard USS Norton Sound 1958

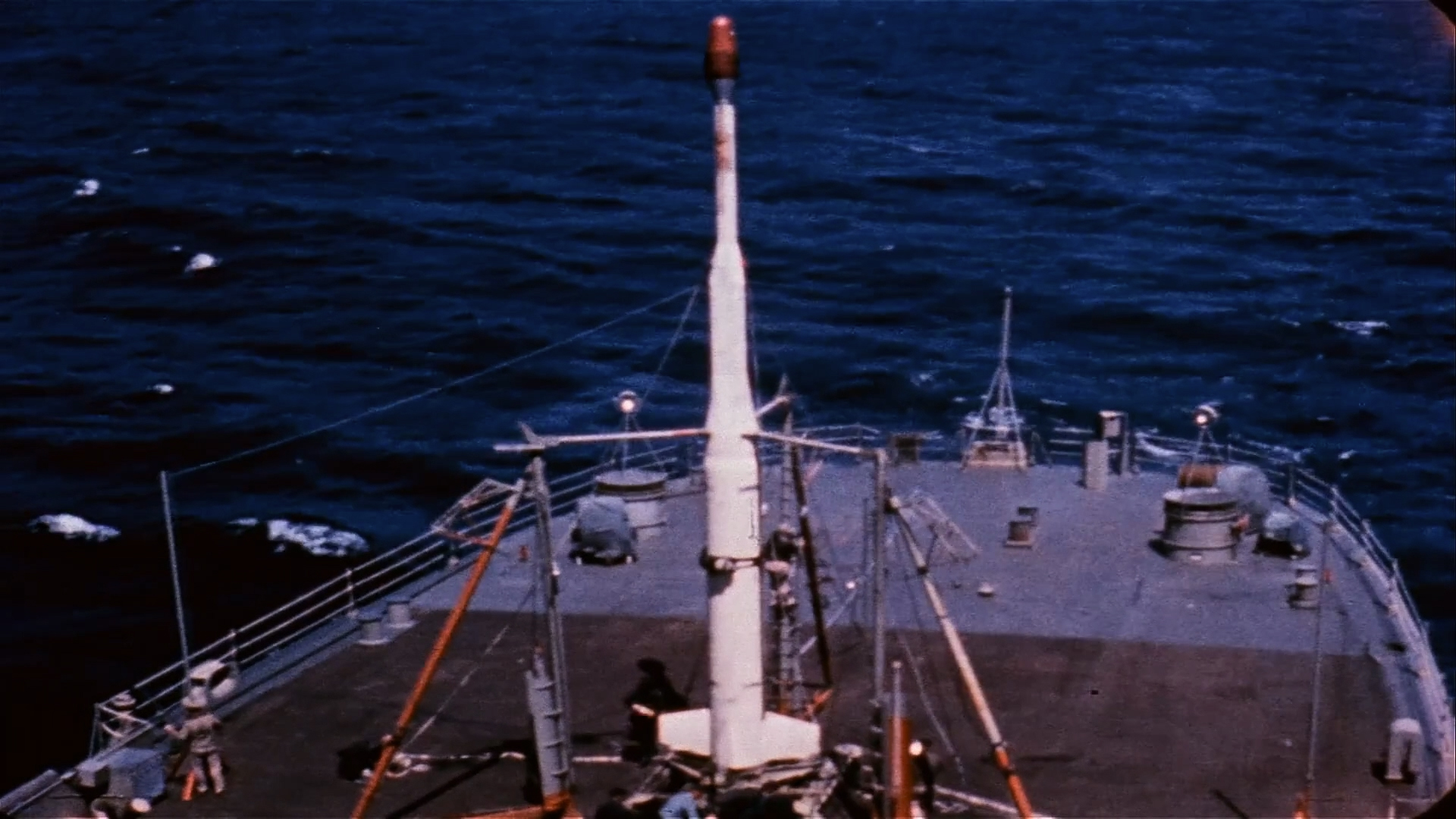
X-17A awaiting launch aboard USS Norton Sound 1958

In August and September 1958, Norton Sound participated in Operation Argus. From south of the Falkland Islands she launched three X-17A rockets carrying low-yield atomic warheads. Detonations occurred at an altitude of 300 miles (480 km), and effects were monitored by the Explorer IV satellite and other instrumented rockets. Analysis of the data contributed to the discovery of the Van Allen radiation belt. Her commanding officer, Captain Arthur R. Gralla, received the Legion of Merit for his role leading the task force responsible for these tests.

The ship returned to San Diego in June 1959 and resumed Terrier and Tartar test launchings. These operations continued until June 1962, when she steamed for Norfolk, Virginia, where she was decommissioned 10 August 1962.

=== 1962 to 1969 ===
==== Typhon combat system ====
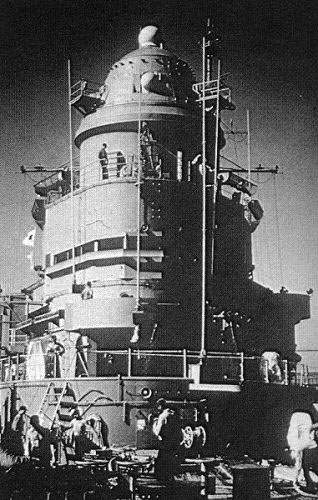
USS Norton Sound in 1963 with the AN/SPG-59 Typhon Combat System radar atop the superstructure

In November 1962, she was towed to Baltimore, Maryland for installation of the Typhon Weapon Control System, including the AN/SPG-59 radar. This was completed early in 1964, and Norton Sound recommissioned 20 June 1964 for weapons research.

Homeported in Baltimore, Norton Sound operated for several months in Chesapeake Bay, evaluating the Typhon System. She was then assigned to Port Hueneme in July 1965. Her mission was increased to include evaluation of the Sea Sparrow missile, which she first launched 13 September 1965.

During a three-month stay at Long Beach Naval Shipyard commencing 15 July 1966, all Typhon equipment was removed. For the next two years, Norton Sound evaluated various missile countermeasures. She also tested ECM equipment, and a new concept in gyroscope design.

==== Mark 45 5-inch/54-caliber gun tests ====
Norton Sound entered Long Beach Naval Shipyard 13 June 1968 for regular overhaul. The yard also installed the new light-weight Mark 45 5"/54 gun mount with associated control components for test. Into 1969 she continued in test and evaluation work with the Pacific Fleet.

=== 1970 to 1986 ===
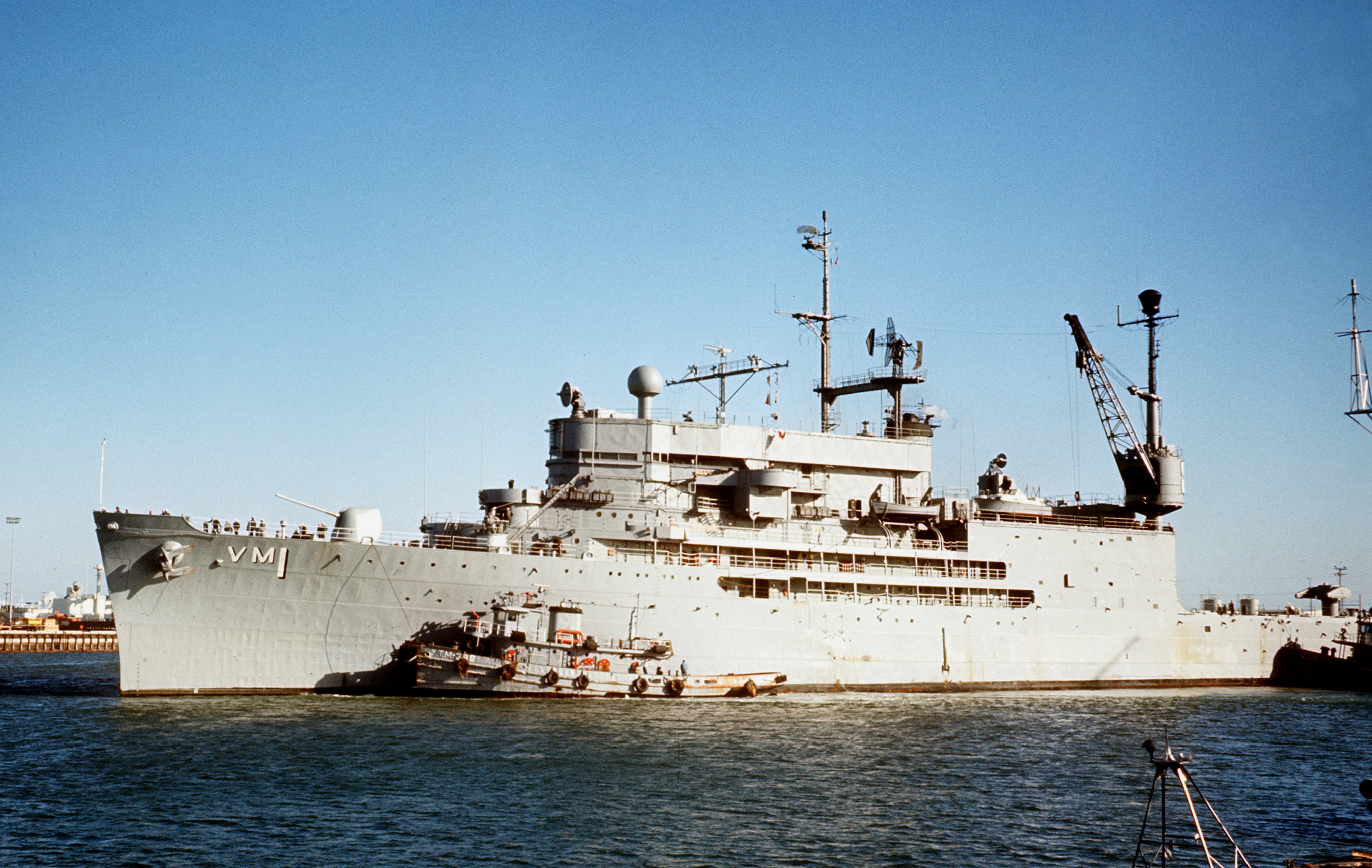
USS Norton Sound departing the shipyard at Long Beach ca. 1970, fitted with a Mark 45 5-inch/54-caliber gun for underway trials

Ensign Charlene Albright, one of first women assigned to shipboard duty, aboard Norton Sound, 1978

==== Aegis combat system ====
In 1973, she received the first ship-borne installation of the Aegis Combat System, which later became the primary combat system in U.S. Navy cruisers and destroyers.

In the spring of 1981, the pre-production model of the Vertical Launching System (VLS) was installed at Ingalls Shipbuilding in Pascagoula, Mississippi. During the next two years the VLS underwent extensive testing. The Norton Sound was the only AT-SEA Testing Platform for the AEGIS Weapon System, later installed on Ticonderoga-class cruisers and Arleigh Burke-class destroyers. The summer of 1983 saw the installation of an advanced VLS which underwent testing until the end of Norton Sound's active service.

Norton Sound was decommissioned 11 December 1986, and struck from the Naval Register 26 January 1987. Title was transferred to the Maritime Administration 20 October 1988, and she was laid up in the National Defense Reserve Fleet. Later the USS Norton Sound was sold to an overseas firm where she was scrapped.

One of her anchors is on display in WestSound Viewpoint at the end of McCall Blvd in Bremerton, WA, overlooking Puget Sound Naval Shipyard and Dyes Inlet.

The other anchor and ship's bell is on display at the Port Hueneme Historical Society Museum in California.

== See also ==
- HMS Girdle Ness – British missile trials ship
