= F110-class frigate =

Class of Spanish Navy frigates

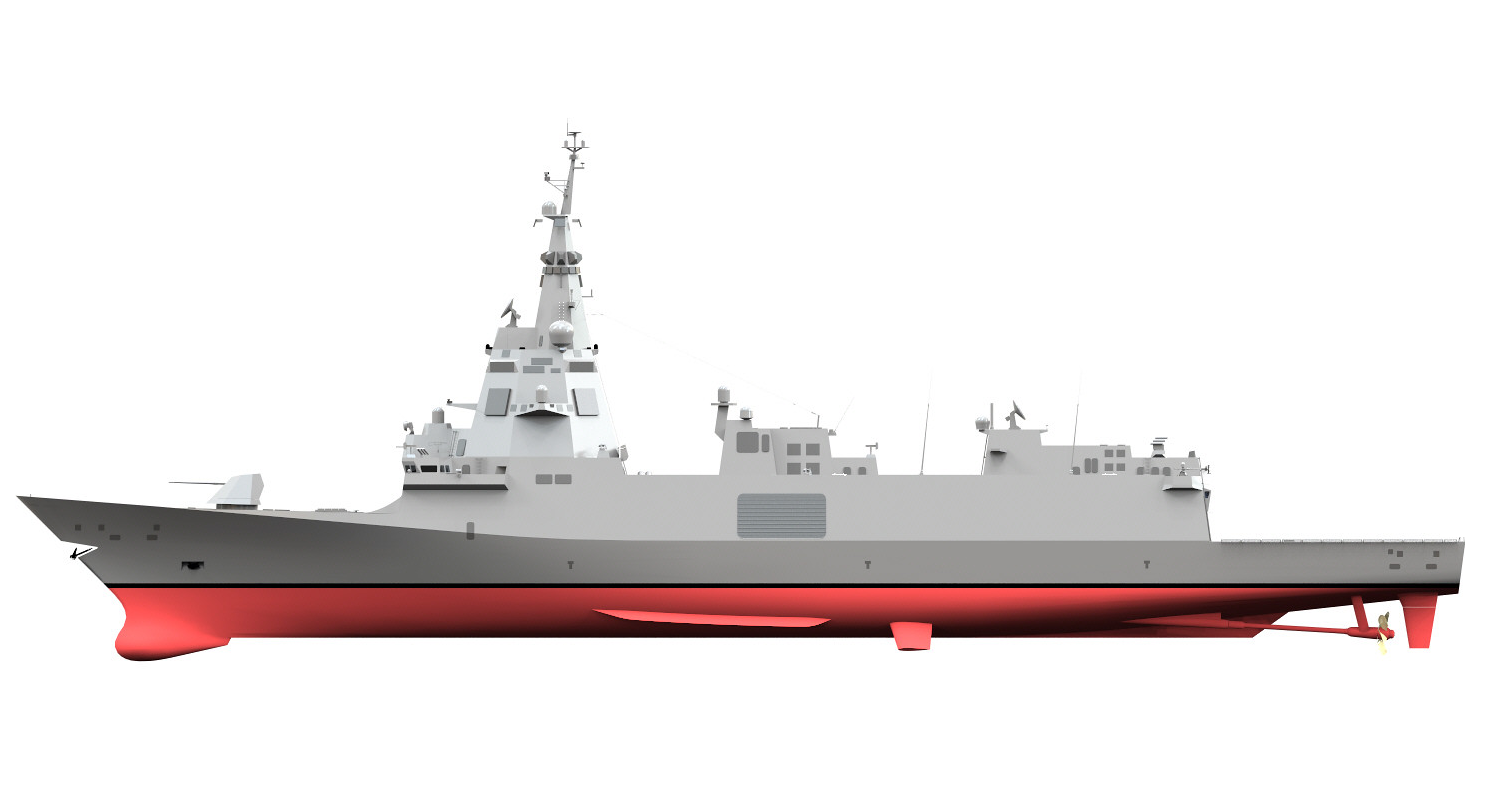
- F110 class

Class overview
- Name: Bonifaz class (F110)
- Builders: Navantia
- Operators: Spanish Navy
- Preceded by: Álvaro de Bazán class
- Cost: € 4.3 billion (US$4.85 billion) for five units; € 860 million (US$971 million) per unit
- Planned: 5 ordered (+ 2 potentially)
- Building: 4

General characteristics
- Type: Guided missile frigate; ASW frigate
- Displacement: Flight I: 6,100 t (6,000 long tons); Flight II / IAMD: 6,700 t (6,600 long tons)
- Length: Flight I: 145 m (475 ft 9 in); Flight II / IAMD: 150 m (492 ft 2 in)
- Beam: 18 m (59 ft 1 in)
- Draft: 5 m (16 ft 5 in)
- Propulsion: CODELAG: 1 × GE LM2500 gas turbine (22 MW (30,000 hp)); 2 × Ingeteam electric propulsion motors (3.4 MW (4,600 hp)) supplied by 4 × MTU 20V4000 encapsulated diesel generator (3 MWe); Propellers; 2 × Kongsberg Maritime controllable pitch propellers; 1 × Brunvoll azimuth bow thruster (retractable , shock qualified)
- Speed: Flight I: > 35 knots (65 km/h; 40 mph); Flight II / IAMD: 29 knots (54 km/h; 33 mph)
- Complement: Flight I: 150; Flight II / IAMD: 170
- Sensors & processing systems: Flight I; Combat systems; SCOMBA (Navantia Combat Management System); International Aegis Fire Control Loop (IAFCL); Underwater combat suite: Thales Thales CAPTAS-4 Compact (variable depth, towed array sonar); Thales BlueMaster UMS 4110 (hull mounted sonar, active and passive, low-frequency); Thales BlueScan digital acoustic system (AI sonar data fusion); Radars; Lockheed Martin AN/SPY-7(V)2 (S-band (IEEE), AESA, GaN T/R module, early-warning radar); Indra 25X Prisma (X-band (IEEE), AESA, GaAs T/R module, 2D, surface multifunction radar (low altitude surveillance, helicopter landing)); Electro-optical sensors; Indra / Technobit IRST i110; Saab NLWS: 10 lateral and 1 vertical sensors; Communication systems; Rohde & Schwarz external communications systems; R&S NAVICS with R&S M3SR SDR (including R&S Series4100 HF, R&S Series4400 VHF/UHF, Link 11 / Link 22 tactical data link); TUUM-6 underwater communication system; Navigation systems; GMV’ SENDA; Flight II; Combat systems; SCOMBA NG (Navantia Combat Management System)
- Electronic warfare & decoys: F110 Flight I: Indra Rigel; Rigel i110 radar electronic defence; Regulus i110 communications interception systems
- Armament: F110 Flight I: Torpedoes: 2 × Mark 32 Mod 9 with Mk54 lightweight torpedo; Missiles: 16-cells (2 × 8 Mk 41 VLS (baseline VII)) with RIM-162 ESSM Block 2 (quad-packs per cell); 2 × 4-cell NSM launchers with NSM Block 1A missiles; Guns: 1 × 127 mm OTO 127/64 LW Vulcano naval gun with Vulcano guided ammunition; 2 × Escribano E&M Sentinel 30 RWS (30 mm); 4 × Escribano E&M Sentinel 12.7 RWS (12.7 mm); F110 Flight II / IAMD: Torpedoes: 2 × Mark 32 Mod 9 with Mk54 lightweight torpedo; Missiles: 16-cells (2 × 8 Mk 41 Tactical Length VLS); 48-cells (6 × 8 Mk 41 Strike Length VLS); 2 × 4-cell NSM launchers; Guns: 1 × 127 mm OTO 127/64 LW Vulcano naval gun with Vulcano guided ammunition; 2 × Escribano E&M Sentinel 30 RWS (30 mm); 4 × Escribano E&M Sentinel 12.7 RWS (12.7 mm); Decoys: 6 × Mark 36 SRBOC (counter anti-ship missile / loitering munitions)
- Aircraft carried: 1 × SH-60 Seahawk or NH-90 helicopter

The F110 class, also known as the Bonifaz class, are a multi-purpose, anti-submarine class of Aegis combat system-fitted heavy frigates under construction for the Spanish Navy. The project is being co-developed by the Spanish Ministry of Defence and the state-owned company Navantia. The construction of the first unit (Bonifaz) started in April 2022 and it was launched on September, 11, 2025, beginning the scheduled deliveries. The frigates of the Bonifaz class will eventually replace the Santa María class frigates.

== Background ==
A simplified drawing of the pre-design made by Navantia

The origins of the F110 class project are in the planned replacement for the Spanish Navy's Santa María-class frigates, as contemplated in the ALTAMAR Plan, a Spanish naval white book to modernize the Spanish Navy, with five frigates originally to be built as an enlarged version of the Álvaro de Bazán-class frigates. This concept was later discarded in favor of a mostly clean sheet design.

On 23 December 2011, the Spanish Ministry of Defence awarded a €2 million contract to Indra and Navantia for the design of an integrated sensor mast. In 2015, both companies agreed to develop and integrate the mast and future sensor suite in the ship's SCOMBA (Local Aegis version) combat system. Both companies created a consortium called Protec 110 for this project, with finance from the Ministry of Industry, Energy and Tourism, now the Ministry of Energy, Tourism and Digital Agenda and Ministry of Economy, Industry and Competitiveness.

In June 2017, a Spanish fleet admiral said that his Navy hopes the project will be approved by the end of 2017 or by 2018 at the latest. In September 2018, the Spanish Ministry of Defence announced the selection of the Raytheon RIM-162 ESSM Block 2 as the ships' primary anti-air self-defence weapon.

In March 2019, the go-ahead order for the project was approved by the Spanish Council of Ministers. In April 2022, an official act was carried out that began the construction of the first of the units.

== Design ==
Navantia is working on the project referred to by the company as F2M2 and has a working group with members of the Spanish Navy, to design the ship's capabilities. According to statements by Frigate Captain Carlos Martínez-Merello, Head of the Resources and Media Definition Section of the General Staff of the Navy in 2010, during the Conference on Naval Programs in progress and future programs, that the new frigate must be adapted to the current scenarios in response to conventional and asymmetric threats, such as patrol of a coastline or operations against pirates, which do not require a large vessel.

According to the Spanish Navy, the new frigates must have an operational life of 40 years, have accommodation for extra personnel, and be capable of operating with unmanned vehicles—aerial, surface, and sub-surface. Regarding the desired characteristics, the Navy requests a sustained speed in excess of 25 knots (46 km/h; 29 mph) and maximum of 35 knots (65 km/h; 40 mph). The F110 will have a multi-purpose area for flexible mission profiles, 240 days of operation at sea, and 18 months of high availability.

The first design of the five presented was of trimaran type. This was rejected due to the noise of its propulsion system, a great disadvantage since it is looking to develop an anti-submarine ship. The vessel will be seven cm (2.8 in) shorter than the F100. It will have a narrower beam of 18 m (59 ft) against 18.6 m (61 ft) of the F100. It can perform humanitarian and combat operations. The superstructure of the vessel will be integrated. The material of the superstructure is not yet defined, although it is likely to be a composite material instead of aluminum. The ship's hull will be made of steel.

It will carry an Aegis system with an AN/SPY-7 warship radar from Lockheed Martin. The US Aegis system modified with the Navantia SCOMBA system will be installed. To make it more difficult to locate by radar or thermal imaging, the class will have some stealth capacity, with masts or blocks of sensors not installed on the superstructure. It will have a single gas escape zone that will be installed in the upper deck, and the air intakes will be placed in line with the superstructure. The loading area is below the flight area, with the installation of a downhill ramp on the starboard side. There is a possibility of using an output device similar to that used by the Danish logistical support vessels of the Absalon class.

== Ships in class ==
There are five units of the class planned.

Builder	Contract	Sub-class	Name	No.	Status	Steel cutting	Keel laying	Launched	Comm.	Notes
Spanish Navy (5 ordered)
Navantia (Ferrol shipyard)	Batch 1; 23 Apr 2019	F-110 (Flight I)	Bonifaz	F111	Fitting out	7 Apr 2022	17 Aug 2023	11 Sep 2025	2028	Programme months ahead of schedule.
Navantia (Ferrol shipyard)	Batch 1; 23 Apr 2019	F-110 (Flight I)	Roger de Lauria	F112	Fitting out	16 Dec 2023	25 Apr 2025	27 Oct 2026	2029	Programme months ahead of schedule.
Navantia (Ferrol shipyard)	Batch 1; 23 Apr 2019	F-110 (Flight I)	Menéndez de Avilés	F113	Under construction	25 Apr 2025	20 Jul 2026	2027	2030	Programme months ahead of schedule.
Navantia (Ferrol shipyard)	Batch 1; 23 Apr 2019	F-110 (Flight I)	Luis de Córdova	F114	On order	2026	2027 / 2028	2028 / 2029	2031	Programme months ahead of schedule.
Navantia (Ferrol shipyard)	Batch 1; 23 Apr 2019	F-110 (Flight I)	Barceló	F115	On order	2027 / 2028	2028 / 2029	2029 / 2030	2032	Programme months ahead of schedule.

Estimated dates

== Procurement ==
=== Planned orders ===
Spain
Spain is expected to purchase two more F-110, but they will be in the Flight II / IAMD variant, with an improved combat management system, additional VLS cells.

=== Current bids ===
Denmark
The Flight II / IAMD variant is being offered to the Danish Navy.
Egypt
As of January 2026, Egypt appears to be negotiating the purchase of some F110 frigates.

=== Failed bids ===
Greece
Navantia offered 4 F110 frigates to the Hellenic Navy. The design selected in the end was the FDI.
Norway
Navantia offered the F110 frigate to Norway as a successor to the Fridtjof Nansen class. In the end, the Type 26 won the bid.
Poland
Navantia offered the F110 frigate to Poland, and it was shortlisted for the final selection. In the end, the Type 31 won the bid.

== See also ==
- Type 26-class frigate, an equivalent British design
  - Hunter-class frigate, Australian subclass of Type 26 frigate
  - River-class destroyer (2030s), Canadian subclass of the Type 26 frigate
- Anti-Submarine Warfare Frigate, a class of comparable Dutch ships
- F125-class frigate, a German class of frigates
- Amiral Ronarc'h-class frigate, a French class of frigates
- FREMM multipurpose frigate, French/Italian collaboration
- Iver Huitfeldt-class frigate, of the Danish Navy has roughly the same tonnage
- List of frigates
