= W60 (nuclear warhead) =

The W60 was nuclear warhead developed for the United States Navy's long range Typhon LR surface-to-air missile.

== History ==
Typhon development started in November 1959 with a conceptual study of the system and in March 1960 the Atomic Energy Commission was asked to begin feasibility studies for a nuclear warhead for the system, which they reported back on in June. In August 1961, the Lawrence Radiation Laboratory (now Lawrence Livermore National Laboratory) was assigned development of the warhead and in November the XW-60 name was assigned to the program.

In February 1962 a safety study determined that the warhead had an inherent fire safety risk leading to the development of a fire-protection package for the weapon. This was followed by further fire safety concerns in 1963. The medium range version of the system (25 to 40 miles (40 to 64 km)) was cancelled around this time while the long-range version of the system was reorientated towards a 200 miles (320 km) weapon and relegated to study-only.

The warhead was cancelled in December 1963 following the cancellation of the Typhon missile that same month due to cost and system vulnerability.

In approximately 1966, the XW60 was briefly considered alongside the W58 warhead for possible use in the AGM-69 SRAM air-to-surface missile. The Los Alamos W69 warhead was ultimately chosen for the system.

== Design ==
The W60 weighed between 115 and 150 pounds (52 and 68 kg), was 20 inches (510 mm) long and 13 inches (330 mm) in diameter.

The warhead yield has been variously described as "lower than that of the W58" (which had a yield of 200 kilotonnes of TNT (840 TJ)) and "very low".
