= AN/SPG-59 =

US naval radar

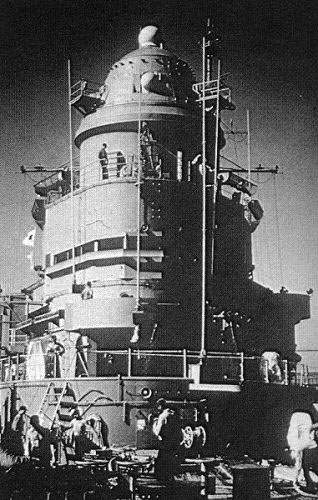
- Country of origin: United States
- Introduced: Canceled 1963
- No. built: 1
- Type: 3D Air-search and tracking
- Range: 110 nmi Maximum
- Azimuth: 0 to 360°

The AN/SPG-59 was an advanced PESA phased array radar developed by the U.S. Navy starting in 1958. It was one of the earliest phased array radars. AN/SPG-59 was intended to offer search, track and guidance from a single radar system and antenna as part of the Typhon combat system. Paired with the new RIM-50 Typhon missile, the system was to provide wide-area air defense out to about 110 nautical miles (200 km) from suitable anti-aircraft cruisers. Both the radar and missile proved to be well beyond the state of the art of the era, and the project was eventually canceled in December 1963.

In accordance with the Joint Electronics Type Designation System (JETDS), the "AN/SPG-59" designation represents the 59th design of an Army-Navy electronic device for waterborne fire control radar system. The JETDS system also now is used to name all Department of Defense electronic systems.

== The Typhon Combat System ==
The Typhon/SPG-59 started as a response to the introduction of sea-skimming anti-ship missiles into service with Soviet Naval Aviation groups. First-generation missile systems like Talos and Terrier used a combination of beam riding and semi-active radar homing (SARH) that required a special targeting radar to illuminate the target through the entire interception. Typical installations included either two or four such illumination radars, which limited the number of simultaneous interceptions. Facing volleys of missiles such systems could easily be overwhelmed.

Adding additional radars was possible, but difficult to arrange as the radars were fairly large and required a clear view of the sky, limiting the number of suitable locations. This led to a "specification convergence"; since there could only be a small number of radars, the missile receivers were built to tune in only a small number of potential "channels". That meant that increasing the number of radars would also require the missiles to be updated as well.

== System Characteristics ==
The AN/SPG-59 avoided this problem by acting as both the search and illumination radar. This reduced the problem of siting, as there needed to be only one radar on the ship, albeit a very large one. The Typhon missiles also helped solve this problem, switching from semi-active radar homing, and beam riding to tracking by a track-via-missile system. In this system the receiver on the missile is a wide-band receiver, and forwards its received signals back to the ship. The ship's on-board computers then calculate the interception course and forward it back to the missile from an omni-directional antenna. This is similar to the older command guidance system, but avoids the inaccuracies of that system by locating the receiver on the missile, which is closer to the target and therefore sees a stronger signal. Although this system required the missiles to be able to tune in a number of command radio channels, these are generally much simpler and smaller than radar receivers, allowing a much larger number of channels to be supported.

== Development Problems ==
Development of the radar suffered from multiple problems from its start. The phased array radar required a very large number of individual broadcaster elements which proved to be unreliable and very expensive. Additionally, the power requirements of the system were so huge that only nuclear-powered ships could provide the necessary power to operate the system. Although such ships were then under construction, they were politically controversial. The radar was canceled in December 1965 (?), because of mounting technical problems and being considerably over budget.

One of the developmental failures was that of a ferrite 1:2 switch. It was a half-height WR-159 waveguide design that required a constant holding current of 1.2 amperes at ? volts to switch. There were 100+ of these switches in the system. About this time, a technique was discovered or invented that used a current pulse for switching and did not require the steady holding current. Thus, the switch design was obsolete even as they were being manufactured.

The 1:2 switch also failed high power test. When fed the kilowatt+ microwave energy from the system TWT, the ferrite lost its magnetic properties and it became a 1:2 power divider rather than a switch with a 20 dB isolation between the 2 output ports. This had a devastating effect on the radar's transmit beamforming. (WFJ)

== Typhon Test Vessel ==
In November 1962 USS Norton Sound (AVM-1) was towed to Baltimore, Maryland for installation of the Typhon Weapon Control System, including the AN/SPG-59. The conversion was completed early in 1964, and Norton Sound was recommissioned 20 June 1964 to continue tasks in weapons research. Baltimore was designated homeport for Norton Sound, and for several months she operated in Chesapeake Bay, evaluating the Typhon System. Assigned to Port Hueneme, California in July 1965, she arrived there the last day of that month. During a three-month stay at Long Beach Naval Shipyard commencing 15 July 1966, all Typhon equipment was removed following discontinuance of the system.

== See also ==
- List of radars
- List of military electronics of the United States
