= RIM-50 Typhon =

RIM-50 Typhon LR RIM-55 Typhon MR
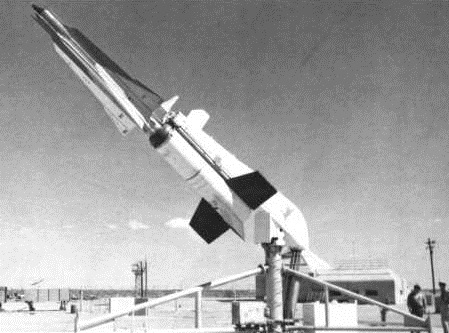
- Typhon LR on launcher
- Type: Long range surface-to-air missile
- Place of origin: United States

Service history
- Used by: United States Navy

Production history
- Manufacturer: Bendix Corporation

Specifications (Typhon LR)
- Mass: 1,700 lb (770 kg) without booster 3,620 lb (1,640 kg) with booster
- Length: 15 ft 6 in (4.72 m) without booster 27 ft 7 in (8.41 m) with booster
- Diameter: 16 in (410 mm) missile 18.5 in (470 mm) booster
- Wingspan: 3 ft 4 in (1.02 m) missile 5 ft 2 in (1.57 m) booster
- Warhead: 150 lb (68 kg) high explosive or W60 nuclear
- Detonation mechanism: Proximity fuse
- Engine: Booster, solid-propellant rocket Sustainer, Bendix ramjet
- Operational range: 200 nmi (230 mi; 370 km)
- Flight ceiling: 95,000 ft (29,000 m)
- Maximum speed: Mach 4.0
- Guidance system: Track-via-missile
- References: Parsch 2001a

Typhon was a missile system developed by the United States Navy in the late 1950s, intended to serve as an integrated air-defense system for Navy fleets. Consisting of the SAM-N-8 Typhon LR, later designated RIM-50A, and the SAM-N-9 Typhon MR, later RIM-55A, paired with the AN/SPG-59 radar system, the cost of the Typhon system led to it being cancelled in favor of the Standard Missile program.

== Design and development ==
Development of Typhon was initiated in the late 1950s, as the existing Talos, Terrier, and Tartar ("3 Ts") long-, medium-, and short-ranged missiles were considered to be approaching obsolescence; in the event of a mass attack by Soviet bomber forces, the requirement for each missile to have its own dedicated ship-based target illuminator would lead to rapid saturation of the defensive system. The Typhon system, developed under a contract awarded to the Bendix Corporation, would overcome this through the use of the AN/SPG-59 electronically scanned array radar system, capable of tracking and engaging multiple targets simultaneously.

The missile system to complement the radar was originally named Super Talos (long-range) and Super Tartar (short-range), but to avoid confusion with upgrades for the existing missiles was soon renamed Typhon. Typhon LR, the only version of the Typhon missile system to be test-flown, was ramjet-powered and capable of intercepting high-speed aircraft and missiles. It could engage targets in the Mach 3–4 range at between 50 feet (15 m) to 95,000 feet (29,000 m) altitude and 6,000 yards (5,500 m) to 110 nautical miles (130 mi; 200 km) range. A secondary capability in the surface-to-surface role, capable of targeting enemy ships, was also included in the specification. While primarily intended to be armed with a conventional high explosive warhead, Typhon LR was designed to be capable of carrying the W60 nuclear warhead.

Typhon MR was designed to be capable of intercepting aircraft at between 50 feet (15 m) to 50,000 feet (15,000 m) in altitude and 3,000 yards (2,700 m) to 25 nautical miles (29 mi; 46 km) range. It had yet to enter testing before the Typhon project was cancelled.

== Operational history ==
In March 1961, the first test launches of the SAM-N-8 Typhon LR took place; beginning in 1962, the test ship USS Norton Sound entered refit to install the Typhon Weapon Control System to allow at-sea tests to be undertaken. However, the expense of the Typhon system, combined with the technical issues encountered during development, led to the program being cancelled in November 1963. The conversion of Norton Sound was allowed to be completed to provide test data, with the ship recommissioning in June 1964; following the tests, the Typhon equipment was removed in July 1966.

In lieu of Typhon, the U.S. Navy developed the Standard Missile family to provide air defense for the fleet, with the RIM-66 Standard and RIM-67 Standard ER missiles replacing Tartar and Terrier, respectively.

== See also ==
- Sea Dart
